= Aula Magna (UCLouvain) =

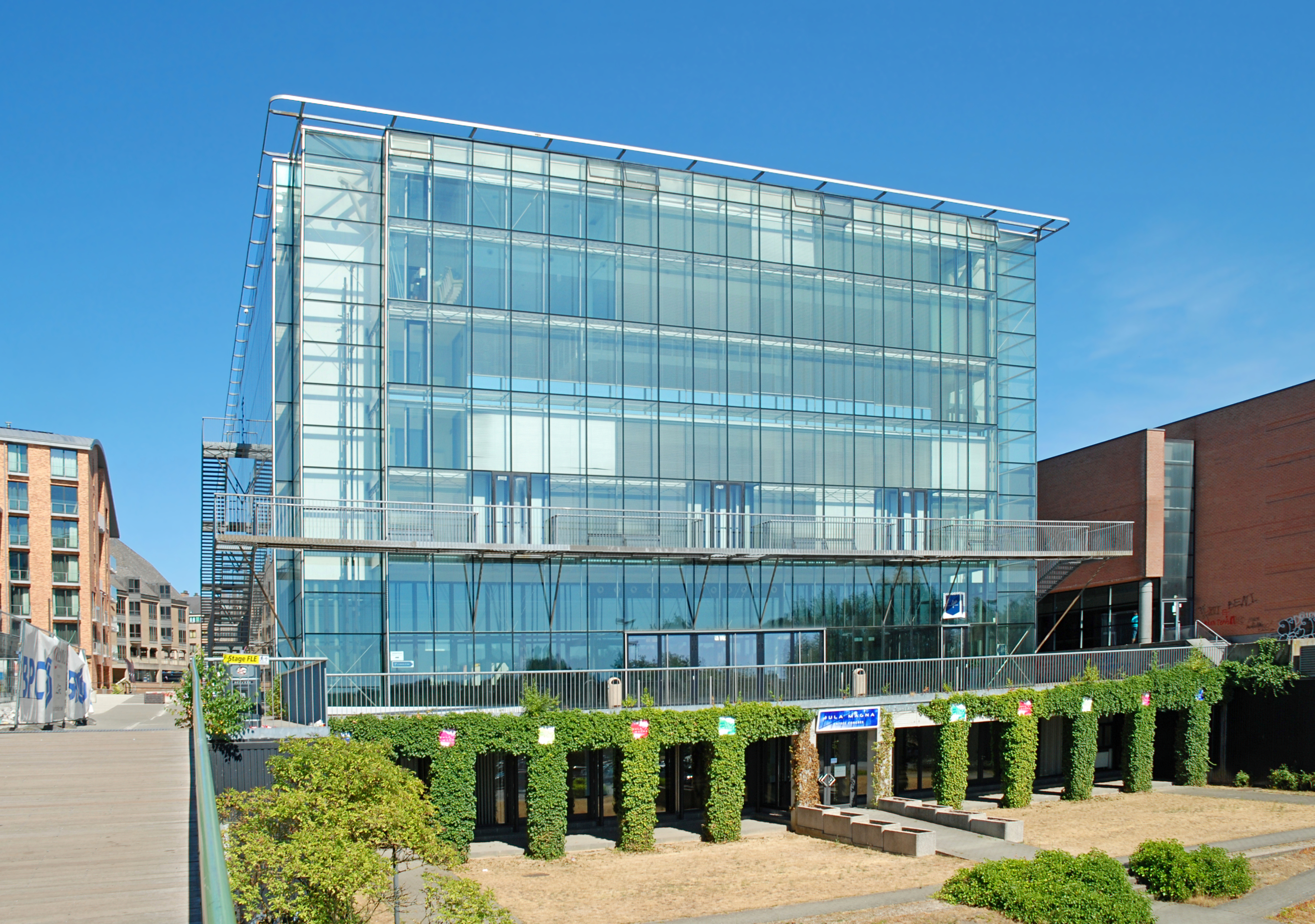
- The western facade, facing the Louvain-la-Neuve lake.

- Location within Belgium

General information
- Architectural style: Postmodernism
- Location: Louvain-la-Neuve, Terrasses de l'Aula 1, 1348 Louvain-la-Neuve, Louvain-la-Neuve, Belgium
- Coordinates: 50.668688°N 4.610177°E
- Construction started: 1999
- Completed: 2001
- Inaugurated: 2 May 2001
- Owner: UCLouvain

Height
- Top floor: 8

Technical details
- Lifts/elevators: 12

Design and construction
- Architects: Philippe Samyn and partners

Other information
- Seating capacity: 1050 + 942
- Number of rooms: 24 (public)
- Parking: Parking Aula Magna; Parking Lac; Parking Montesquieu

Website
- aulamagna.be

The Aula Magna is a postmodern building of the University of Louvain located in Louvain-la-Neuve, a section of the Belgian city of Ottignies-Louvain-la-Neuve, in Walloon Brabant. It holds one of the country's largest auditoria, with a maximum capacity of 1050 seats, and Wallonia's largest stage. Inaugurated in 2001, the complex was designed by Philippe Samyn.

== Location ==
The Aula Magna is located southwest of the Louvain-la-Neuve Grand-Place, between that and the Louvain-la-Neuve lake, of which it constitutes the northern point.

On the upper-level, open air pedestrian level of Louvain-la-Neuve, the Aula Magna complex is located between the Place Raymond Lemaire (with a main entrance on n°1), the Rue des Frères Lumière, the Traverse Comte Yves du Monceau and Cours Michel Woitrin. On the city's underground, car-based level, the Aula Magna is enclosed within the Boulevard André Oleffe, the Aula Magna exit strip (Quai 10) and the Terrasse de l'Aula, where the ground-level entrance is located (on n°1).

The building stands next to the UGC cinema complex and opposite the hotel and the Resort Urbain Agora residential and hotel complex.

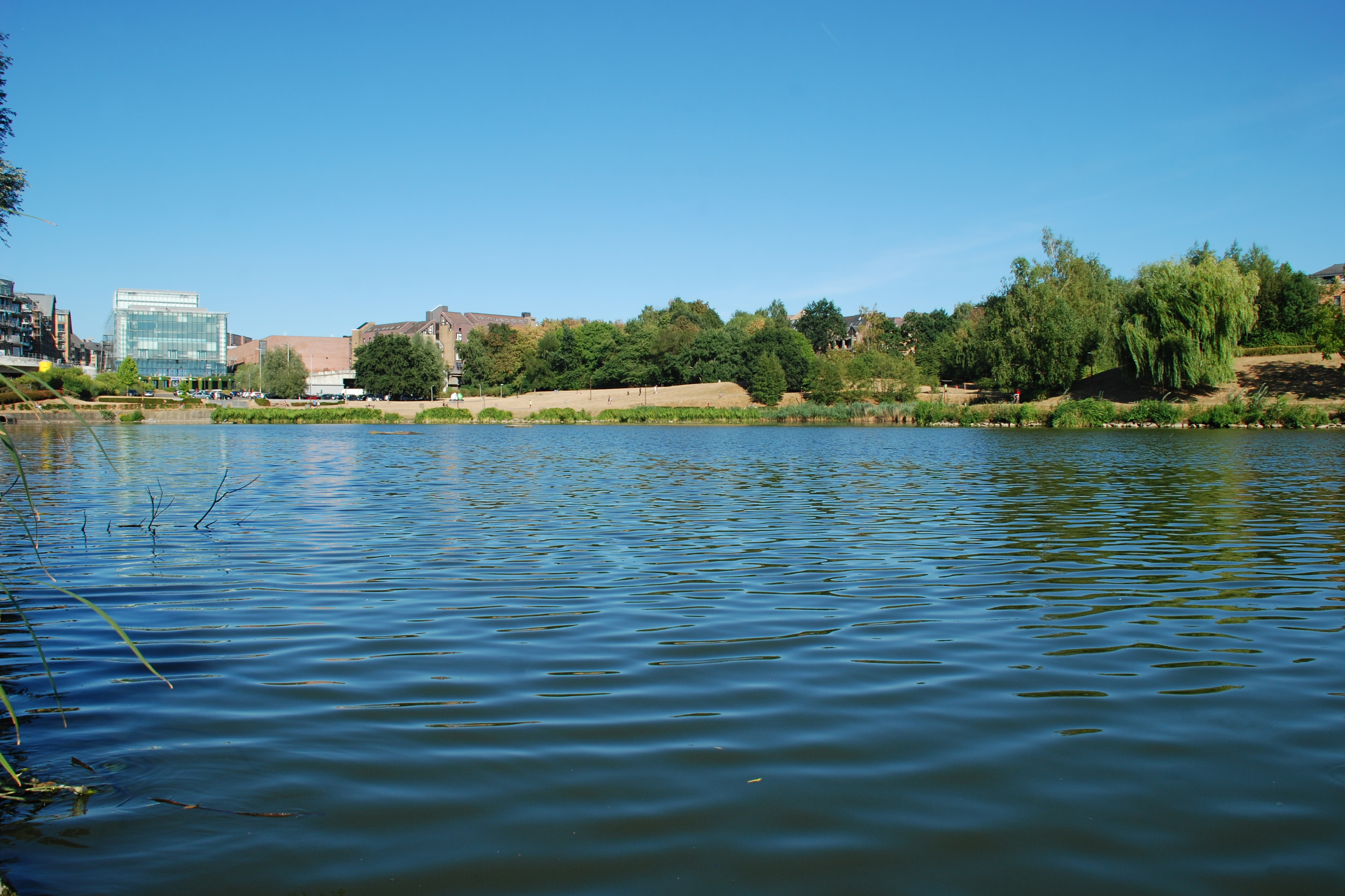
The UCLouvain Aula Magna seen from the Louvain-la-Neuve lake.

== Heritage status ==
The Aula Magna has received the status of Registered monument and is included in the Inventory of immovable cultural heritage of the Walloon region under reference 25121-INV-0078-01.

== History ==
=== Construction ===
Forced to leave the city of Louvain (Leuven) after the Leuven crisis of 1968, the Université catholique de Louvain starts planning a move to the agricultural plateau north-east of Ottignies in current-day Walloon Brabant, where it built an entirely new university town from 1970 onwards. Three major construction phases followed one another until 1981. The Aula Magna, built between 1999 and 2001, is part of an ulterior and additional phase with the aim to expand the city in the direction of the Louvain-la-Neuve lake, together with the Resort Urbain Agora complex (2015-2019). Other planned constructions, like a new university museum, have never been carried out.

=== Inauguration and 575th anniversary ===
The Aula Magna was inaugurated on 2 May 2001, the year of the 575th anniversary of the University of Louvain, in the presence of the authorities of the Katholieke Universiteit te Leuven (KU Leuven), invited for the occasion, during a session to present the insignia of Doctor honoris causa of the University of Louvain (UCLouvain) to four recipients: the writer of Lebanese origin Amin Maalouf, the German painter and photographer Gerhard Richter, the Spanish musician Jordi Savall and the Czech scenographer Josef Svoboda.

According to the newspaper La Libre at the inauguration in 2001, "this vast glass ship moored at the Louvain-la-Neuve Lake symbolizes the completion of the transfer of the French-speaking part of the university to the Walloon Brabant site".

The new building was to be the signal for an extension of the city that was entirely dedicated to culture: it was to be flanked by a complex of thirteen cinemas and the new Louvain-la-Neuve University Museum, but only the cinema would be built (opened 2001). Indeed, three successive projects for a new museum on the shores of Louvain-la-Neuve Lake or near the Aula Magna will abort successively in 1996 (architect Risho Kurokawa), in 2003 (architect Philippe Samyn), and in 2011 (American office Perkins+Will associated with the Belgian firm Émile Verhaegen).

=== Legal changes ===
Since its opening in 2001, the Aula Magna has been managed by a private limited company (S.A.) whose managers were members of the University of Louvain. This changed in 2018 when the S.A. was dissolved and replaced by a non-profit association whose mission was to manage the Aula Magna, now directly under the control of UCLouvain.

=== State visit ===
On 20 November 2018, French President Emmanuel Macron and Belgian Prime Minister Charles Michel met UCLouvain students at the Aula Magna to discuss the future of Europe. They were welcomed by UCLouvain Rector Vincent Blondel, Gilles Mahieu, Governor of the Province of Walloon Brabant and Jean-Luc Roland, Mayor of Ottignies-Louvain-la-Neuve. Students in political science, international relations, public administration and European studies from Saint-Louis University, Brussels, UCLouvain FUCaM Mons, KU Leuven and the Royal Military Academy also participated to the debate.

== Architecture ==
The Aula Magna is both an academic and a multi-purpose auditorium. It has the largest stage in Wallonia, and includes an orchestra pit. The complex comprises a 1050-seat main theatre, and additional rooms and stages: the Foyer du Lac with 300 seats, the Foyer Royal with 250 seats, a dozen of meeting rooms and a vast 1700 m^{2} hall for banquets of up to 1700 people. In total, the Aula Magna can handle 3300 visitors or conference participants simultaneously.

According to the terms of the Inventory of immovable cultural heritage of the Walloon region, the Aula Magna is a "large parallelepiped made of transparent glass and steel, about thirty metres high and seventy metres long". Still according to the Inventory, "two innovative construction techniques were used: the double skin process and hanging from the top of the façade".

The building contrasts with the buildings on the neighbouring Grand-Place, and with the architecture of Louvain-la-Neuve in general, where brick and concrete dominate.

Aula Magna

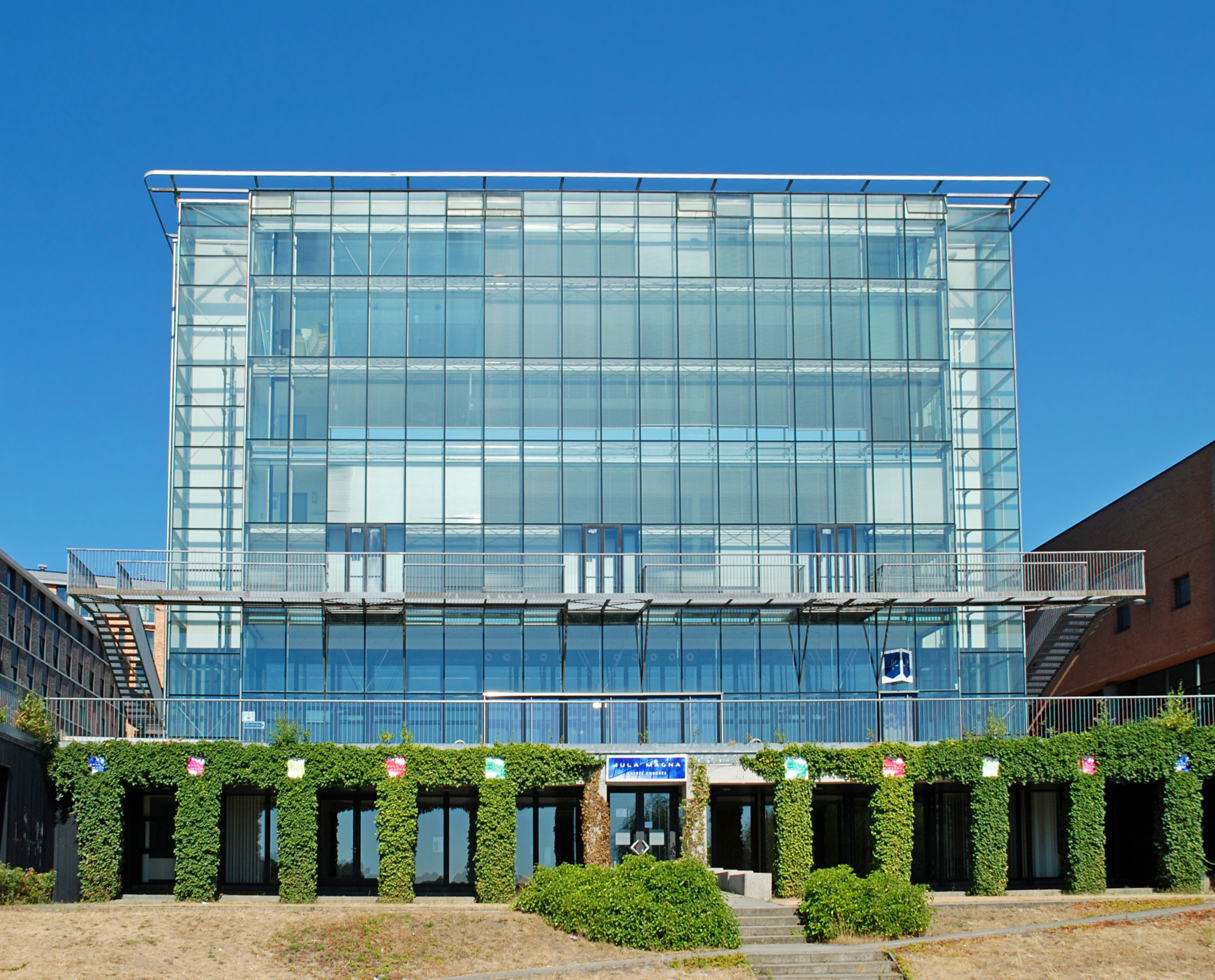
Western facade facing the lake.

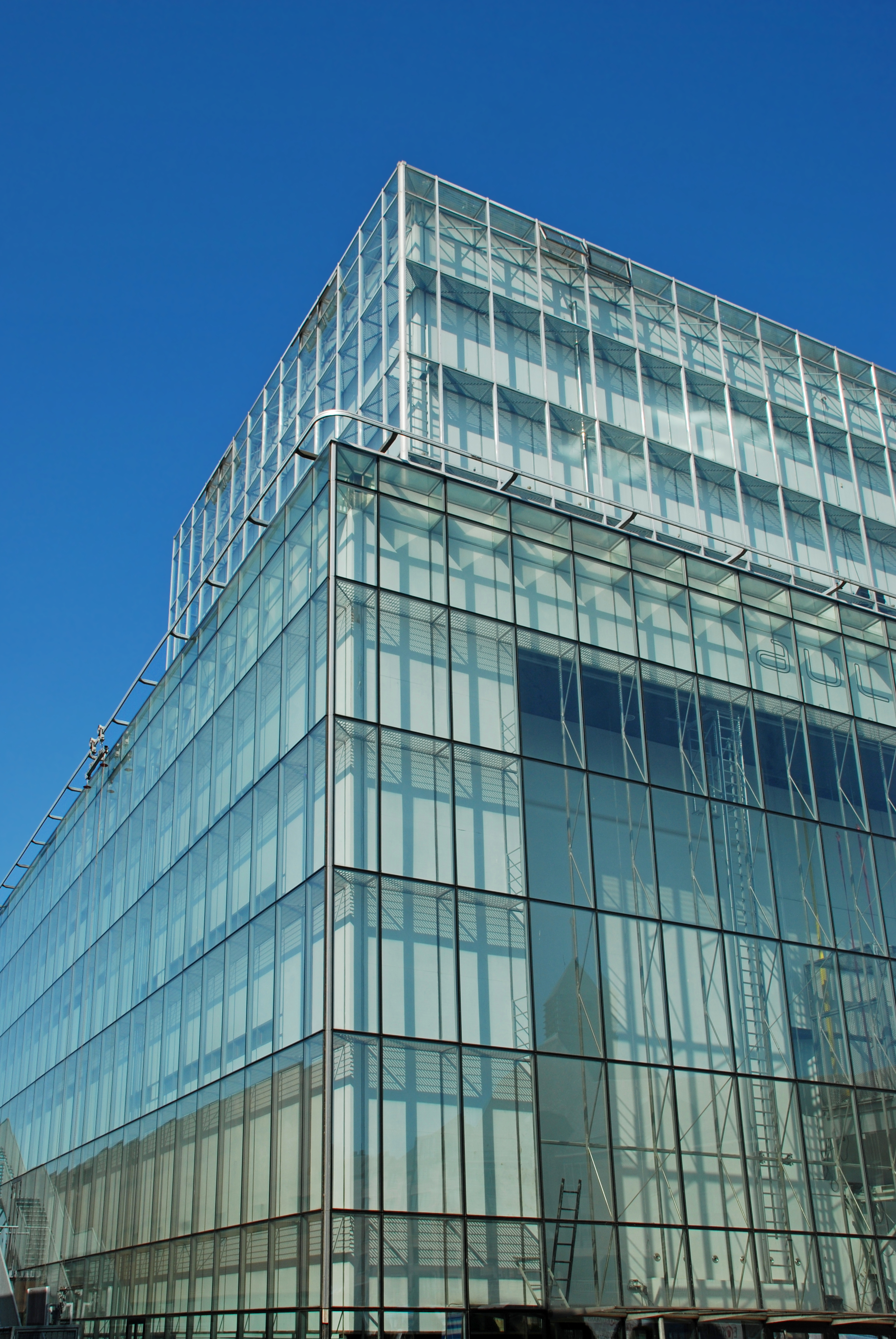
Northeast angle.

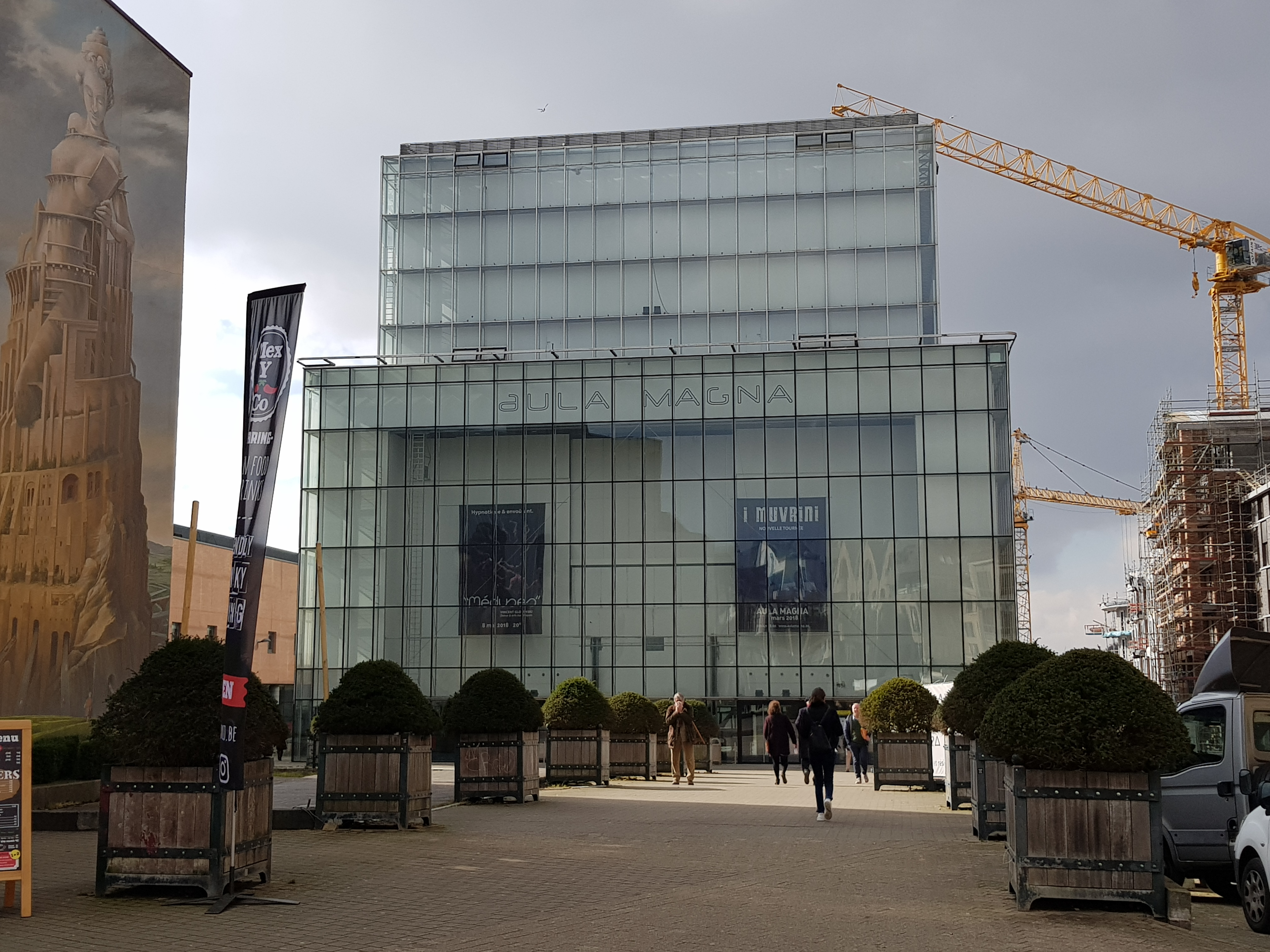
View from the Raymond Lemaire square.

== Public art ==
=== Street art ===
Several frescoes were created on the basement wall of the Aula Magna during the 2015 Kosmopolite Art Tour, an international festival of street art and graffiti that produced collective murals in three Belgian cities: Brussels, Louvain-la-Neuve and Alost.

These frescoes were in the open air when they were created in 2015 but are today confined in the tunnel of Louvain-la-Neuve's Central Ring (Boulevard André Oleffe) following the construction of the Resort Urbain Agora hotel and residential complex.

Three frescoes follow one another: Utopia by Tyrsa and Ilk, which illustrates the imposed theme of the Kosmopolite Art Tour 2015, then a fresco by Delicious Brains and, finally, a fresco by 2Shy.

Tyrsa and Ilk sign their work @Tyrsamisu and @Ilk Flottante in the upper right corner.

Other frescos, created by the Collectif Art Osons, were located on opposite the opposite side. They have completely disappeared following the construction of the Agora Urban Resort: these frescos, signed Horor, Nortone, Nexer and Kaiser, depicted a bionic man and horse, a horse ridden by a rider waving a standard and a bird covered in a breastplate.

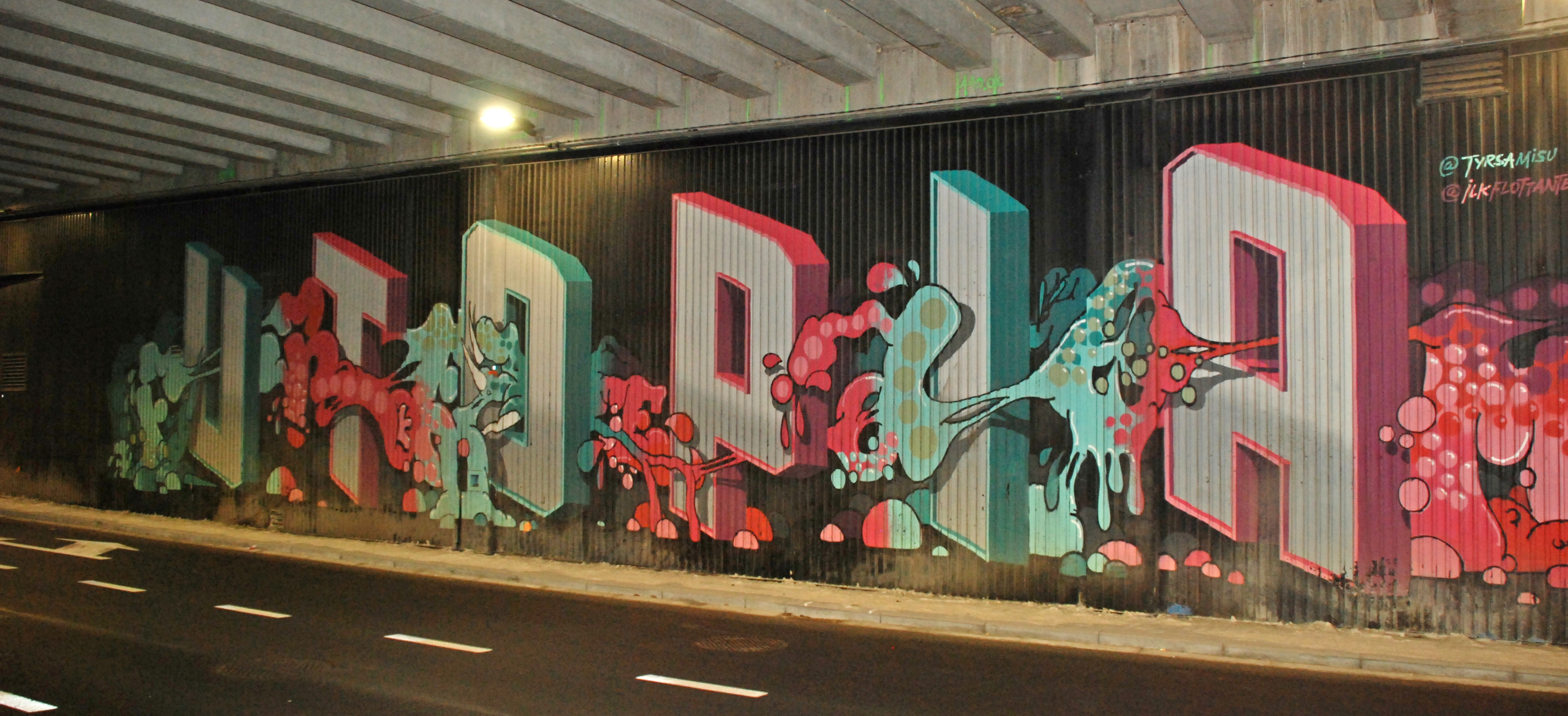
« Utopia » (Tyrsa et Ilk).

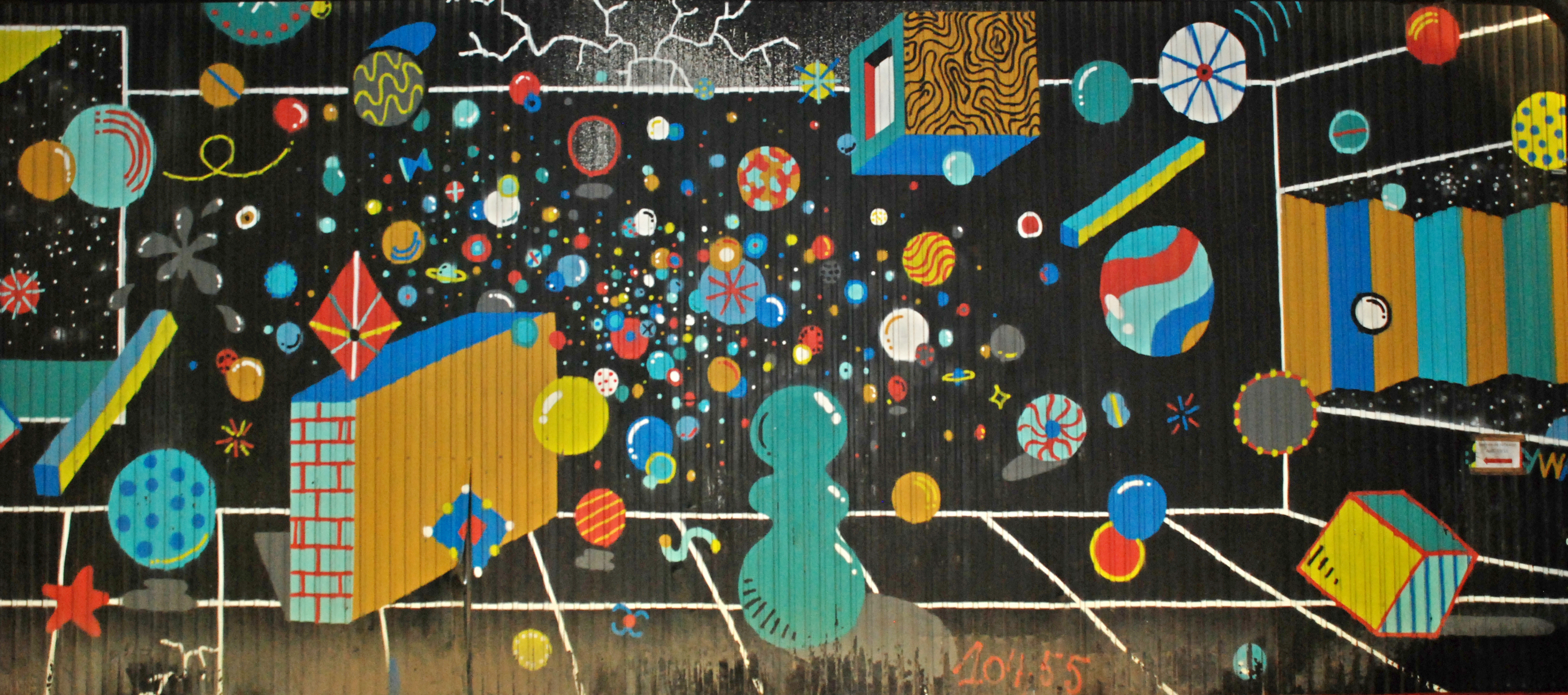
Fresco by 2Shy.

=== Wall paintings ===
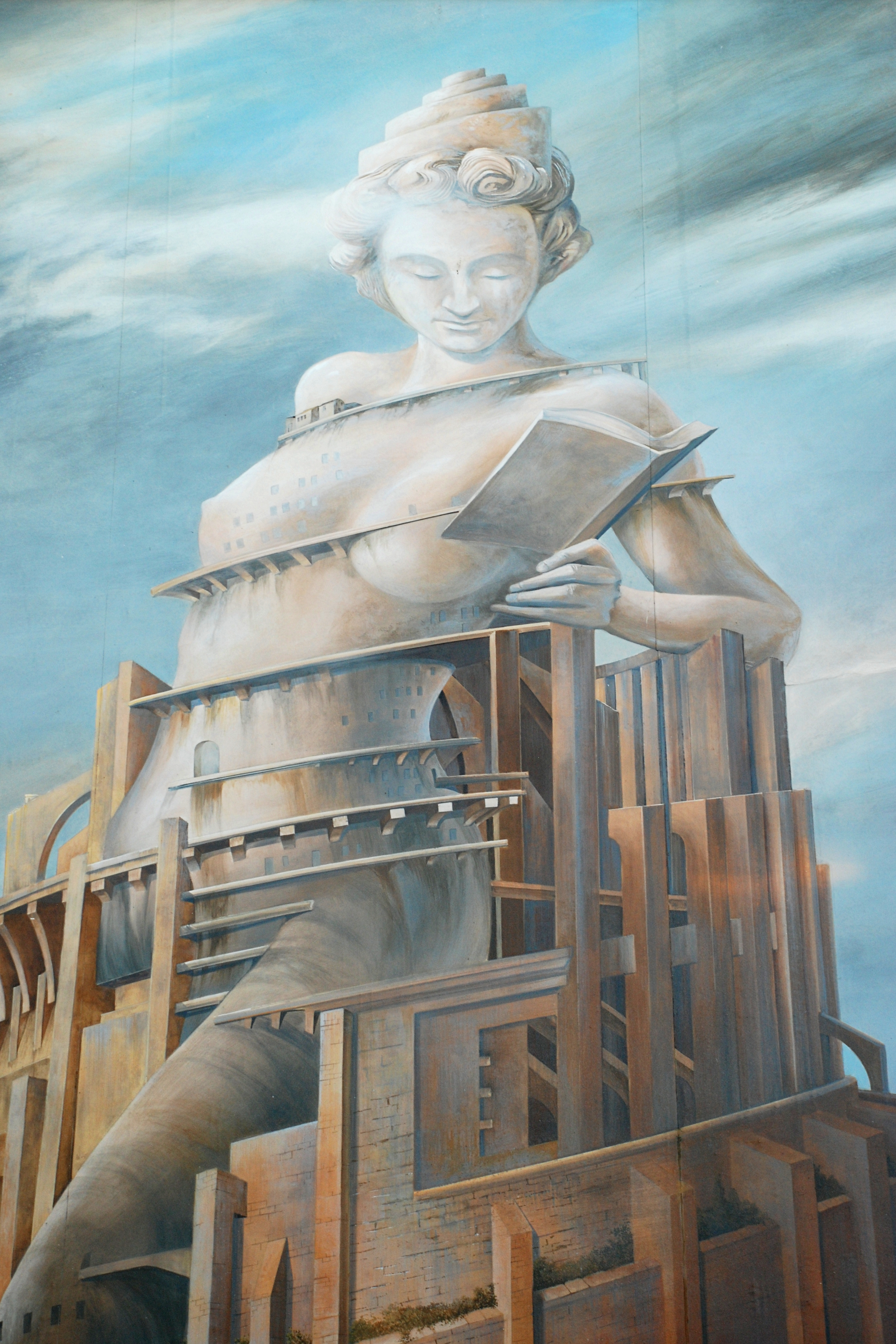
The Infinite Tower (detail).

The Raymond Lemaire square, in front of the Aula Magna, is decorated with a 13-metre high fresco entitled the Infinite Tower, created in 2010. Belgian comic strip artist François Schuiten drew the basic design and the life-size fresco was painted by the artist Alexander Obolensky. The fresco, freely inspired by Breughel's painting, represents the Tower of Babel, which represents for the author the symbol of diversity and knowledge of UCLouvain. A labyrinth and roads entering a basement represent the urban characteristics of Louvain-la-Neuve as an underground city, at the bottom of the fresco.

=== Sculptures ===
East of the Aula Magna, Place Montesquieu houses a vast blue stone sculpture, created by sculptor Pierre Culot in 1980 and entitled Ronde des menhirs, made of stone blocks 40 to 300 cm high forming a 26-metre amphitheatre.

Awarded a prize in a competition organised in collaboration with the French Community of Belgium, this amphitheatre offers a meeting place for students and passers-by, "inviting them to enter the composition and settle in, to recharge their batteries, on the fringes of the surrounding functional architecture".

Ronde des menhirs (Pierre Culot, 1980)

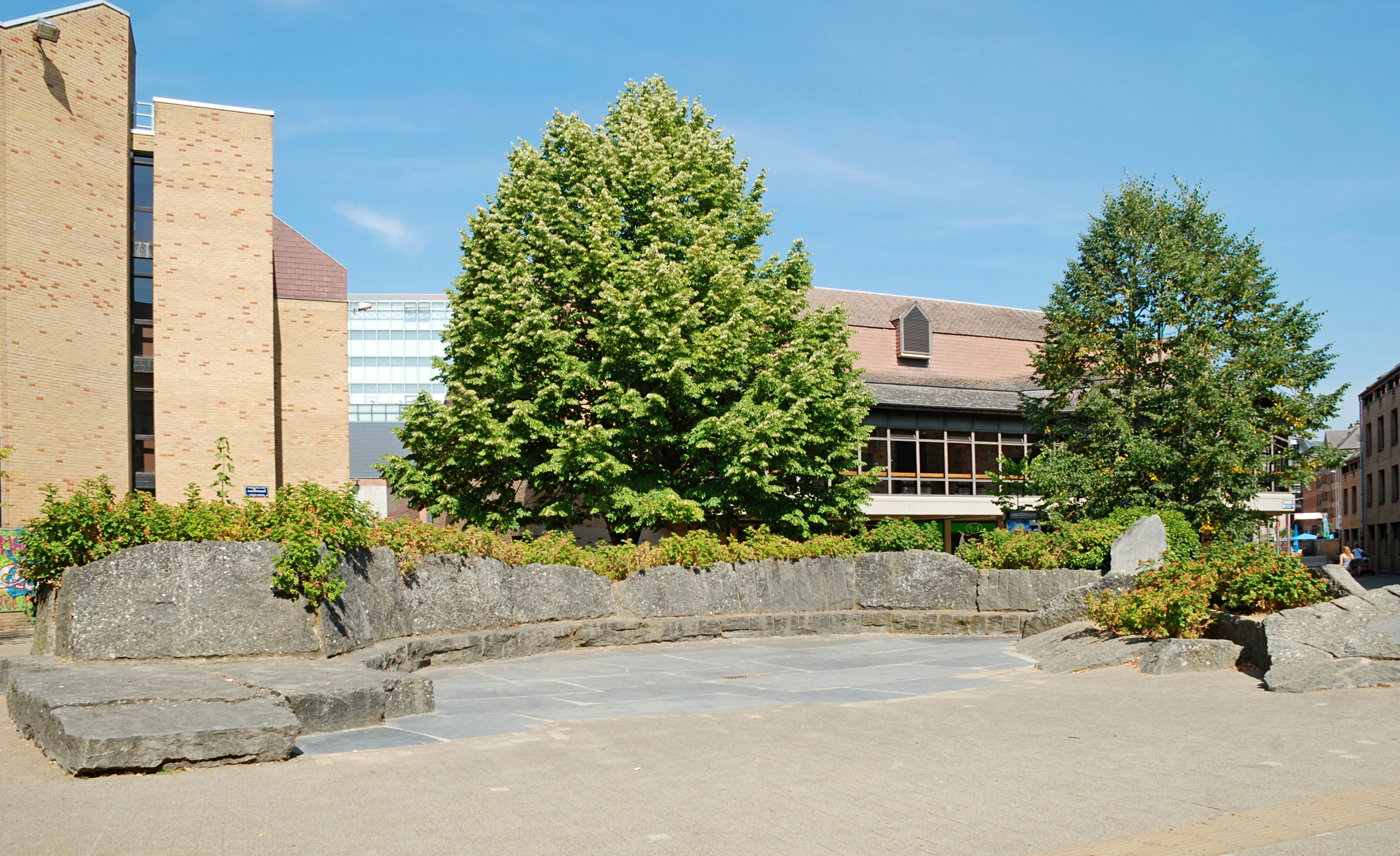

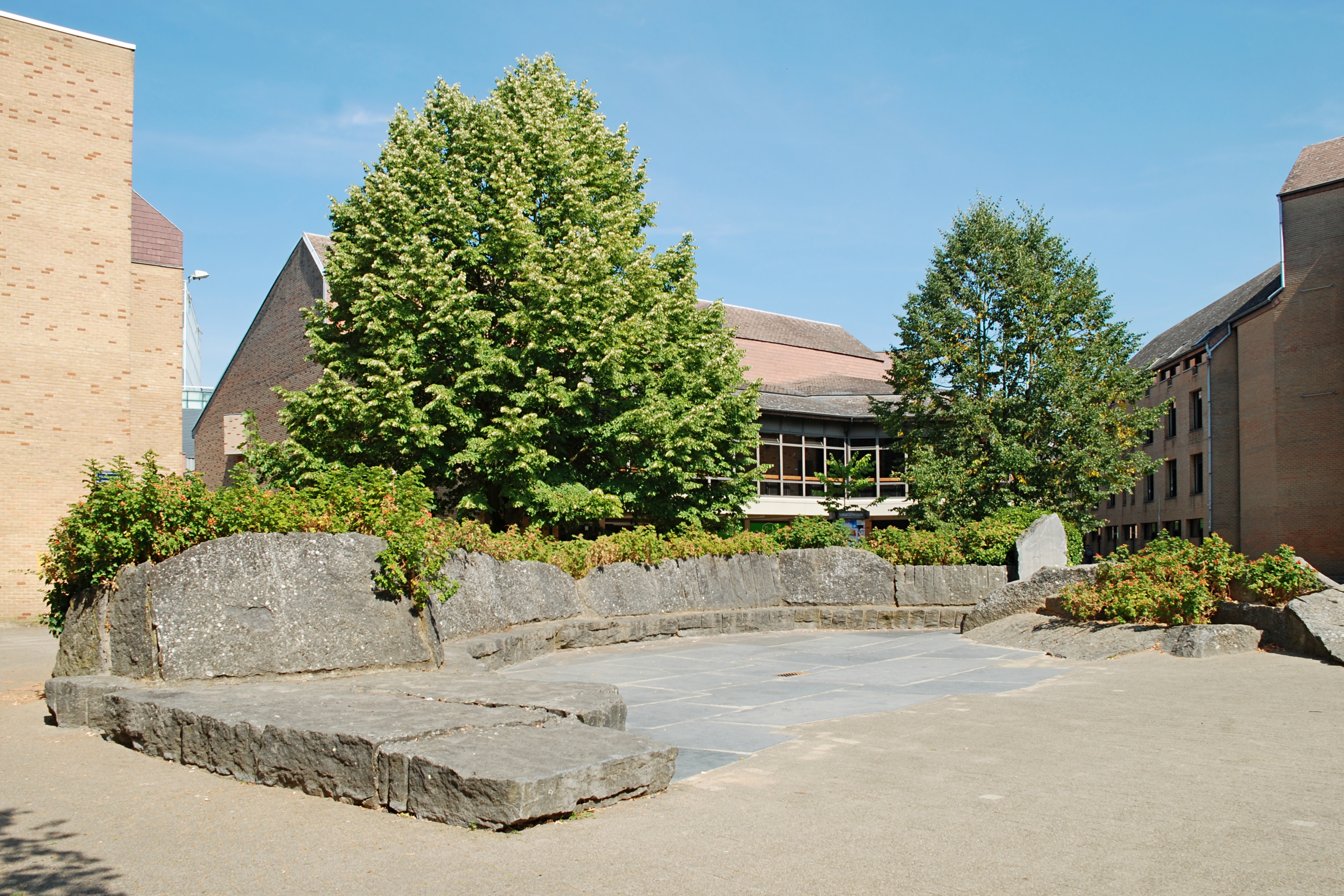

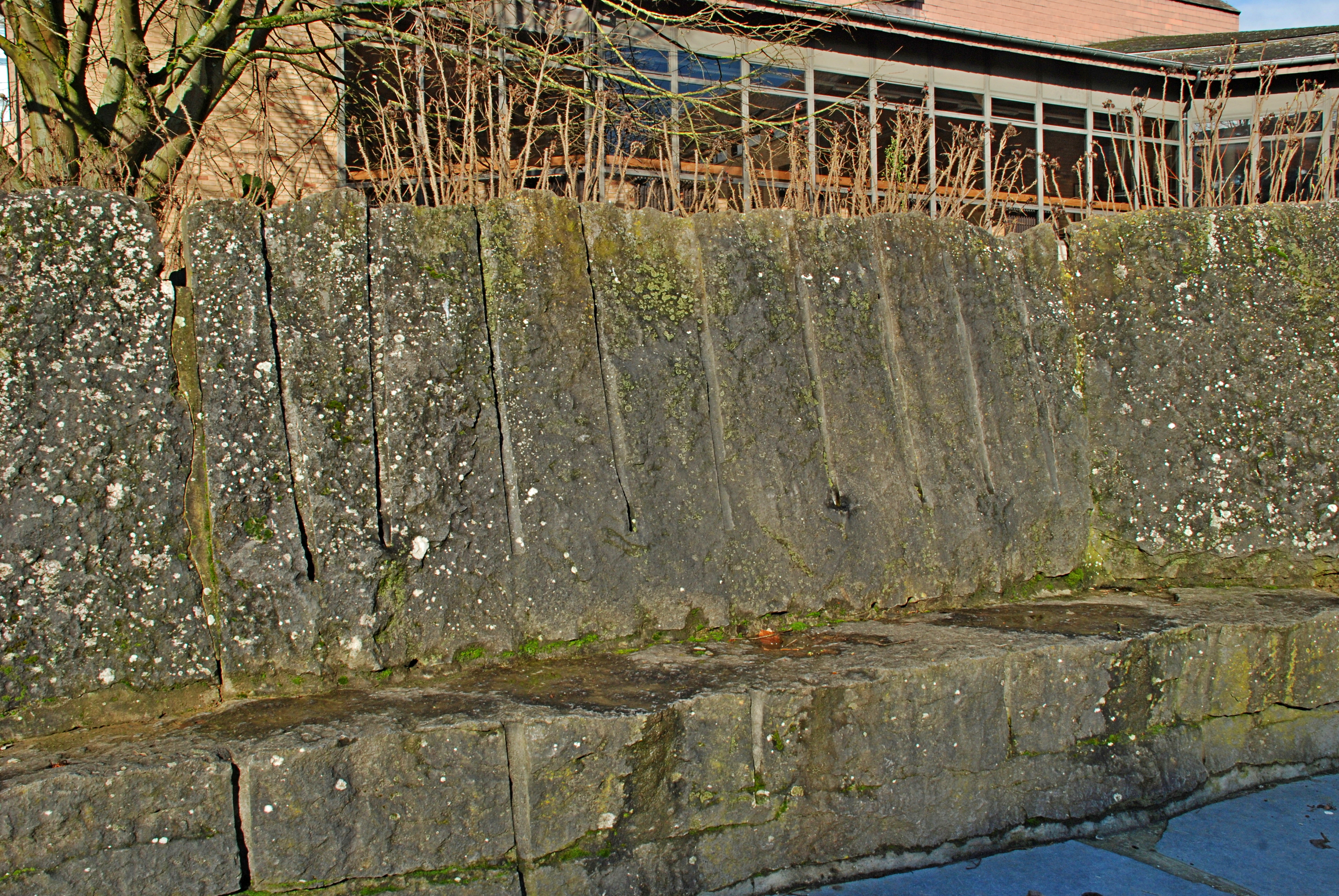

== See also ==
- Louvain-la-Neuve
- Université catholique de Louvain
- Musée L - Louvain University Museum
- List of protected heritage sites in Ottignies-Louvain-la-Neuve
