= Aula Magna =

Aula Magna (Latin, 'great hall') may refer to:

- Aula Magna (Bruxelles), great hall of the Palace of Coudenberg in Brussels
- Aula Magna (Central University of Venezuela)
- Aula Magna (Stockholm University), Sweden
- Aula Magna (UCLouvain), Belgium
