= Roger Dewint =

Belgian artist (1942–2021)

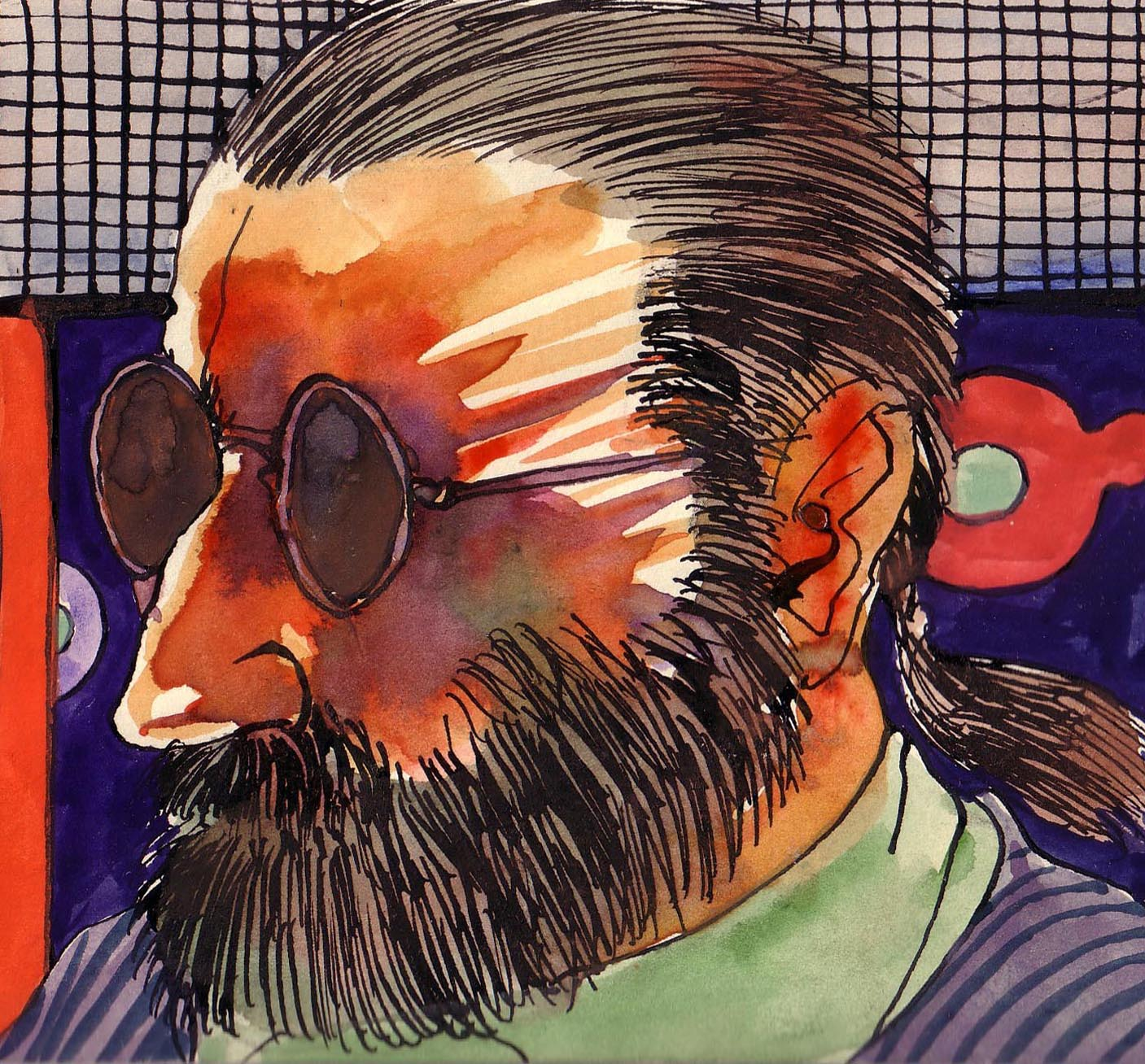
- Self-Portrait of Dewint
- Born: 18 April 1942; Uccle, Military Administration in Belgium and Northern France
- Died: 15 April 2021 (aged 78); Uccle, Belgium
- Occupation: Artist

Roger Dewint (18 April 1942 – 15 April 2021) was a Belgian engraver and painter. He was an honorary professor at the Académie Royale des Beaux-Arts.

== Biography ==
Dewint studied drawing at the Académie Royale des Beaux-Arts. He then discovered engraving at the Académie de Watermael-Boitsfort, where he met fellow painter Roger Somville, with whom he practiced monumental painting.

Dewint's works emphasized the importance of color. His specialty was acquired in his youth with his entrepreneurial father, who decorated works for clients. In his engravings, he inked each plate with all colors used in a single attempt, giving each work individuality.

Dewint held more than 80 personal exhibitions and participated in art festivals. In 2001, he held a retrospective at the Centre de la gravure et de l'image imprimée in La Louvière. He also illustrated many books by authors such as Philippe Roberts-Jones, Jacques Vaché, Georg Trakl, Michel Butor, Julien Gracq, and Laurent Berger.

In addition to engraving, Dewint painted watercolor envelopes, known as mail art. These envelopes have been exhibited both in Belgium and abroad.

Roger Dewint died in Uccle on 15 April 2021, three days shy of his 79th birthday.

== Public collections ==
=== Belgium ===
- Royal Museums of Fine Arts of Belgium
- Museum of Ixelles
- Musée L
- Musée royal de Mariemont

=== Egypt ===
- Library of Alexandria

=== United States ===
- Museum of Modern Art
- Art Institute of Chicago
- San Francisco Museum of Modern Art
- Portland Art Museum
- Metropolitan Museum of Art
- California College of the Arts
- Smithsonian Institution
- Joe Shoong
- Philip Morris International

=== France ===
- Bibliothèque nationale de France
- Bibliothèque Kandinsky

=== Italy ===
- Museo Civico Ala Ponzone, Cremona

=== Japan ===
- Kyoto University of the Arts
- Machida City Museum of Graphic Arts

=== Malaysia ===
- Penang State Museum and Art Gallery

=== Peru ===
- Pontifical Catholic University of Peru

=== Poland ===
- Museum of Art in Łódź

=== Macedonia ===
- Contemporary Art Museum of Macedonia
