= List of protected heritage sites in Ottignies-Louvain-la-Neuve =

This table shows an overview of the protected heritage sites in the Walloon town Ottignies-Louvain-la-Neuve. This list is part of Belgium's national heritage.

Object	Year/architect	Town/section	Address	Coordinates	Number^{?}	Image
Ensemble of the church of Saint-Remy, the rectory and the castle of Ottignies ^{(nl)} ^{(fr)}		Ottignies-Louvain-la-Neuve		50.666102°N 4.565912°E	25121-CLT-0001-01 Info	Ensemble van de kerk Saint-Rémy, de pastorie en het kasteel van Ottignies
Tower Moriensart ^{(nl)} ^{(fr)}		Ottignies-Louvain-la-Neuve		50.665872°N 4.506784°E	25121-CLT-0004-01 Info	Toren van Moriensart
The choir, the transept, the nave and the crypt of the church of Notre-Dame ^{(nl)} ^{(fr)}		Ottignies-Louvain-la-Neuve		50.660990°N 4.564919°E	25121-CLT-0007-01 Info	Het koor, het transept, het schip en de crypte van de kerk Notre-Dame
Church of Notre Dame (including the choir, the transept, the nave and the crypt classified as a monument by Royal Decree of 29 May 1952, as amended by Royal Decree of 5 March 1969), in its entirety, except for the porch ^{(nl)} ^{(fr)}		Ottignies-Louvain-la-Neuve		50.660984°N 4.564679°E	25121-CLT-0008-01 Info	Kerk Notre-Dame (inclusief het koor, het transept, het schip en de crypte geclassificeerd als een monument bij koninklijk besluit van 29 mei 1952, aangepast bij Koninklijk Besluit van 5 maart 1969), in zijn geheel, met uitzondering van de veranda
The remains of the late Baron de Lambermont and surrounding area ^{(nl)} ^{(fr)}		Ottignies-Louvain-la-Neuve		50.688762°N 4.544333°E	25121-CLT-0010-01 Info	De overblijfselen van wijlen Baron de Lambermont en de omliggende terreinen
Domaine Saint-Jean des Bois ^{(nl)} ^{(fr)}		Ottignies-Louvain-la-Neuve		50.681395°N 4.580652°E	25121-CLT-0011-01 Info	
Extension of the classification: domain of Saint-Jean des Bois ^{(nl)} ^{(fr)}		Ottignies-Louvain-la-Neuve		50.679005°N 4.584128°E	25121-CLT-0012-01 Info	
Old farm Douire: facades, roofs and basement ^{(nl)} ^{(fr)}		Ottignies-Louvain-la-Neuve	rue des Combattants, n°2 (M) et terrains environnants (S)	50.663102°N 4.565606°E	25121-CLT-0014-01 Info	Oude boerderij van Douire: gevels, daken en kelder
Biéreau Farm: facades, roofs and cladding of the south wing and the main building of the farm, and the whole barn, with the exception of stables in the courtyard ^{(nl)} ^{(fr)}		Ottignies-Louvain-la-Neuve		50.665777°N 4.617454°E	25121-CLT-0015-01 Info	
Forests of Lauzelle ^{(nl)} ^{(fr)}		Ottignies-Louvain-la-Neuve		50.681443°N 4.614268°E	25121-CLT-0016-01 Info	

== See also ==
- Lists of protected heritage sites in Walloon Brabant
- Ottignies-Louvain-la-Neuve
