= Musée L =

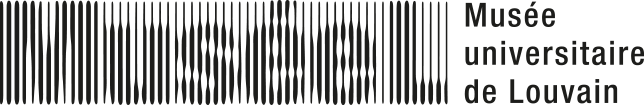

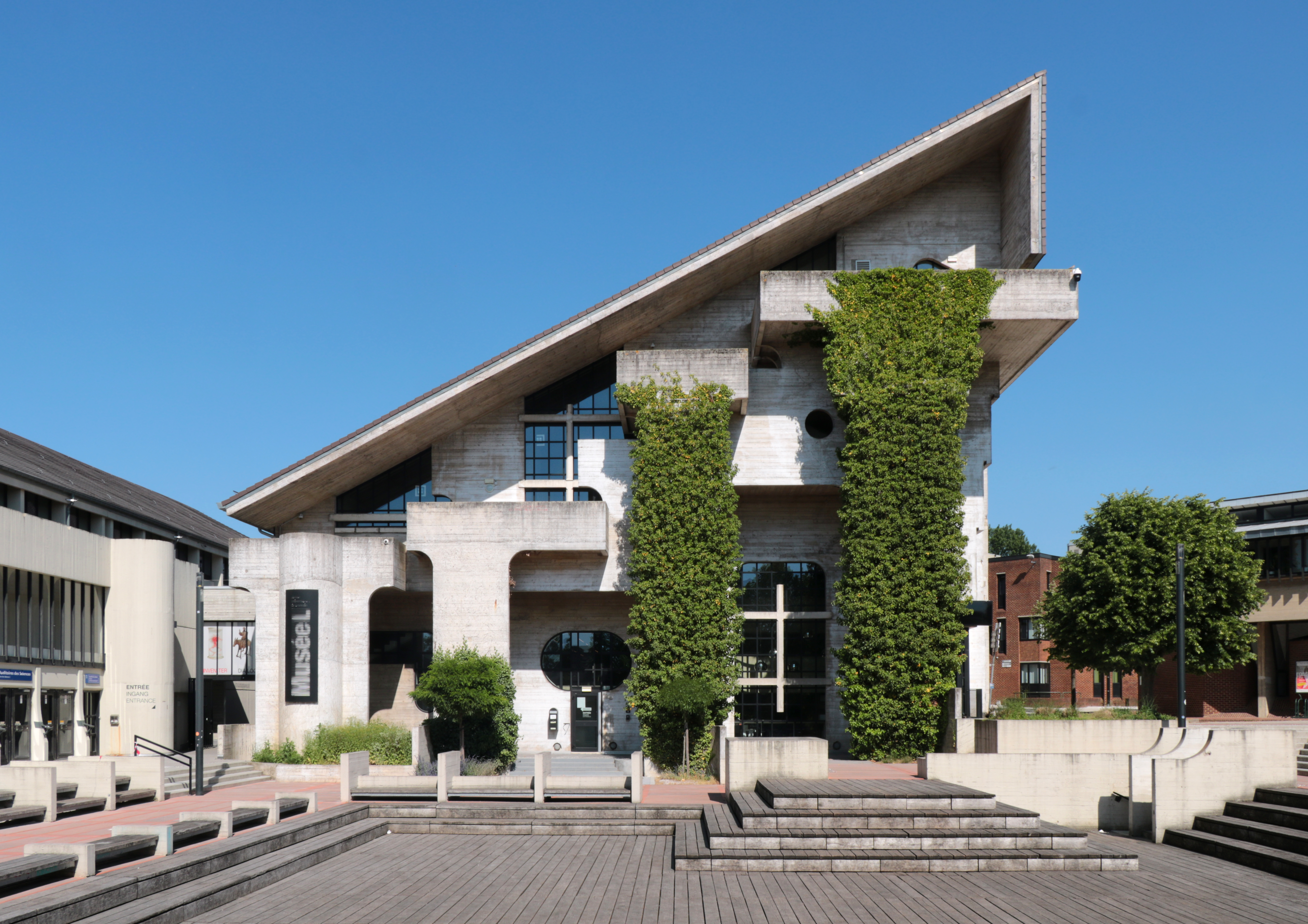
- The old Sciences Library, hosting the Musée L since 2017.

- Location within Belgium
- Former name: Musée de Louvain-la-Neuve
- Established: 22 November 1979 18 November 2017 (reopening)
- Location: Place des Sciences; 1348 Louvain-la-Neuve; Belgium
- Coordinates: 50.668236°N 4.620122°E
- Type: University museum
- Collection size: 32,000
- Architects: André Jacqmain; Jules Wabbes
- Owner: University of Louvain (UCLouvain)
- Website: museel.be

The Musée L or Musée universitaire de Louvain, French for: Louvain University Museum, is a Belgian university museum of the University of Louvain (UCLouvain) located in Louvain-la-Neuve, Walloon Brabant, Belgium.

It is the first large museum that brings together the heritage of a Belgian university and presents it to the general public.^{,}

== History ==
=== History of the museum ===
==== Museum of Louvain-la-Neuve ====
In the United States, all major universities have their own museums, but they are rare in Europe. In this context, Louvain-la-Neuve innovated in 1979 thanks to Professor Ignace Vandevivere who convinced the academic authorities of the UCLouvain to build a museum.

The Museum of the Higher Institute of Archaeology and Art History, known as the Museum of Louvain-la-Neuve, was inaugurated on 22 November 1979 within the Faculty of Philosophy and Arts, at the Erasmus College building (n°1, Blaise Pascal square).

It is based on the collections of the Institut supérieur d'archéologie et d'histoire de l'art, but also presents works by artist Jo Delahaut as well as sculptures by Félix Roulin presented in the open air, with metal tears revealing fragments of human bodies.

The museum was one of the only university museums in Belgium open to the public and had a 1,000 m^{2} space within the Faculty of Philosophy and Arts. It aims to be a place for interdisciplinary encounters, a creative centre for contemporary artists and a space for animation and education.

In 1994, by decision of the UCLouvain board of directors, the museum (managed by the non-profit organisation Musée Art Présent Passé) was detached from the Faculty of Philosophy and Arts and the Department of Archaeology and Art History to become a general scientific entity within the university.

==== Aborted projects for a new museum ====
In 1990, the director of the Ignace Vandevivere Museum planned to build a new museum on the shores of the Louvain-la-Neuve lake and asked the Japanese architect Risho Kurokawa to draft a project. The project foundered in 1996 and gave way to a more modest sketch next to the Aula Magna, designed by Philippe Samyn, around 2000. This 4,000 m^{2} museum should have been constructed in 2003 but unlike its neighboring Aula Magna, was never built.

In 2006, the founder of the stockbroking firm Petercam and UCLouvain alumnus Jean Peterbroeck, a generous patron, offered 10 million euros for the construction of the new museum. In 2008, on the basis of an international competition in which 38 projects were submitted, the project of the American architects Perkins+Will associated with the Belgian bureau Émile Verhaegen was chosen. This new 5,000 m^{2} museum would have been located below the Aula Magna, with a superb view on the lake. It was planned to be a low-energy building, completely curved to follow the contours of the lake, and equipped with a sloping green roof. The UCLouvain sought additional donations to reach a total budget of 18 million euros and obtained the town planning permit in October 2011, when the Peterbroeck family then announced the withdrawal of its donation (withdrawal in which the death of Jean Peterbroeck in May 2011 certainly played a role).

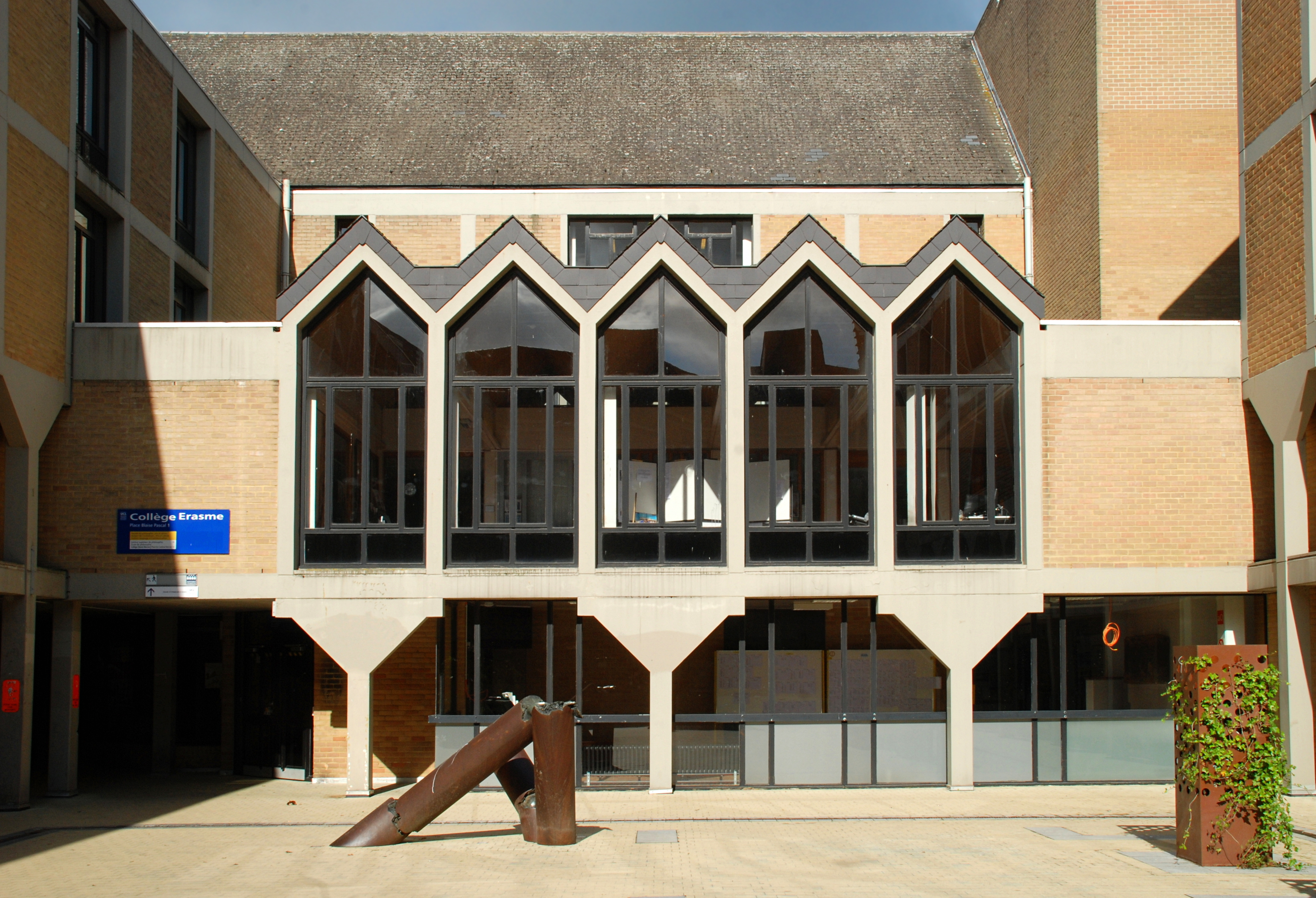
The Erasmus College on Blaise Pascal square, location of the old Museum of Louvain-la-Neuve.

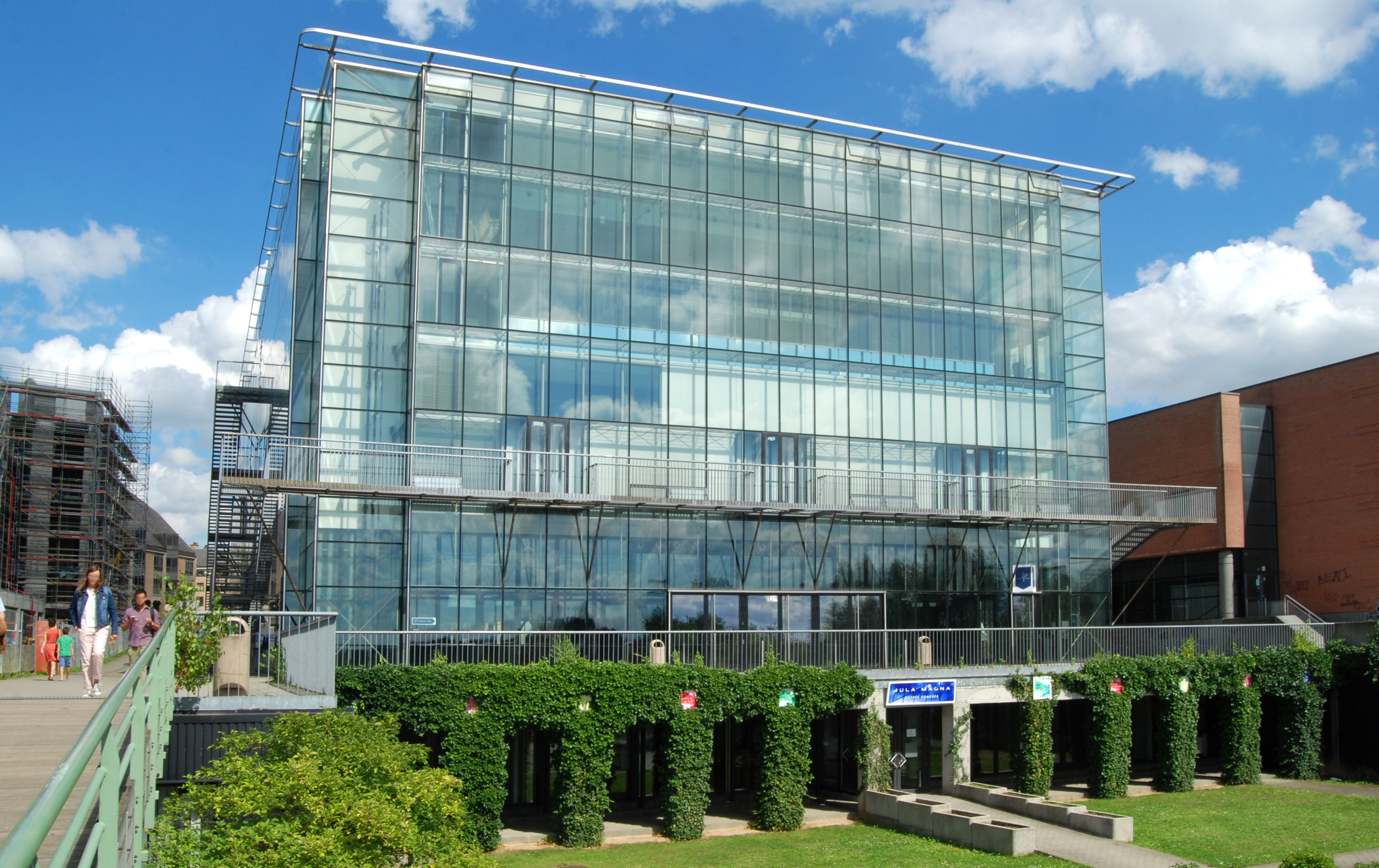
The Aula Magna, next to which two new projects of museums were aborted, in 2003 and 2011.

==== Musée L ====
Having quadrupled its heritage in thirty years, which had become too narrow and lacking in visibility, the University of Louvain had to find a solution after the aborted projects of 1996, 2003 and 2011.

In 2012, Rector Bruno Delvaux explained that the UCLouvain immediately set about seeking another solution, inspired on the actions of its sister university KU Leuven and the University of Ghent. The idea that emerged was to use the iconic Science and Technology Library, located on the Place des Sciences, and transform it in a museum while moving the library to the nearby Lavoisier building. In the end, the library was transferred to the Van Helmont building.

The former Science and Technology Library is a building in a brutalist style built by the architect André Jacqmain between 1970 and 1975, during the construction of the city of Louvain-la-Neuve. It has been one of the most emblematic buildings in the university city since its construction, and was completely renovated from 2015 to 2017 to house the new museum, with Jacqmain's permission.

The renovation work begun in May 2015 and lasted two and a half years. The project cost €10.4 million: €7.4 million for the renovation of the building, €2.3 million for the scenography (designed by the Dutch agency Kinkorn) and €0.7 million for the redevelopment of the museum area. The project is financed by UCLouvain, by the public authorities (including the province of Walloon Brabant, which contributed more than one million euros) and by private patrons (companies and individuals).

The new museum is called Musée L: "L" explained as "Louvain" but also "L" as the shape of the square or as the opening wings (ailes in French), according to director Anne Querinjean, in reference to the Columns and Pilasters in the shape of an "L" or wings that decorate the Place des Sciences as well as the facade and interior of the Science and Technology Library. As the museum of Louvain-la-Neuve, the name is also a reference to its sister city Leuven's (Louvain in French) Museum M.

The Musée L is inaugurated on 14 November 2017 in the presence of Princess Astrid, Ottignies-Louvain-la-Neuve Mayor Jean-Luc Roland, UCLouvain Rector Vincent Blondel and his three predecessors (Marcel Crochet, Bernard Coulie and Bruno Delvaux) as well as numerous local, provincial, regional and federal authorities.

It opened to the public on 18 November 2017.

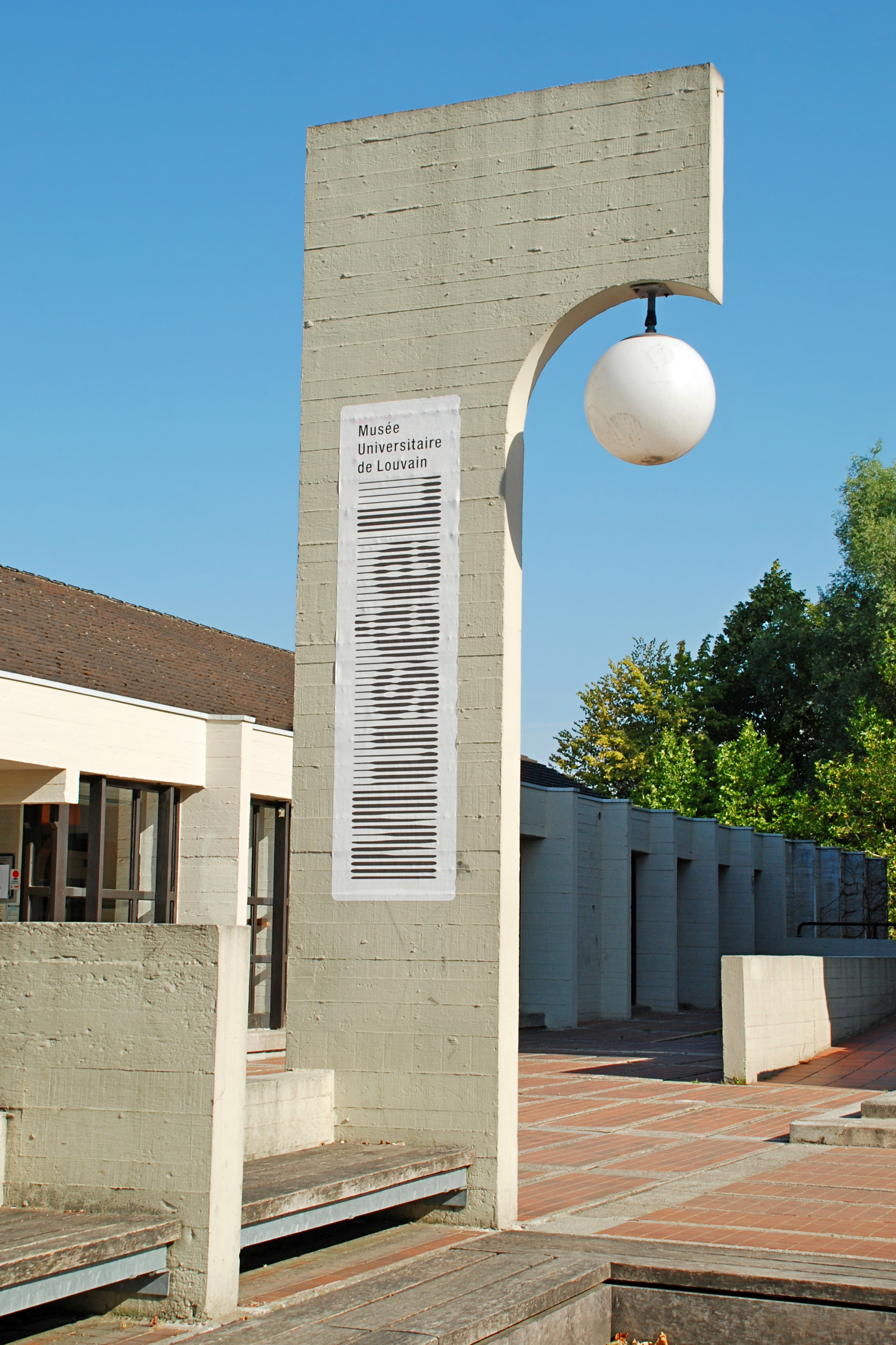
Logo of the Musée L on the Place des Sciences.

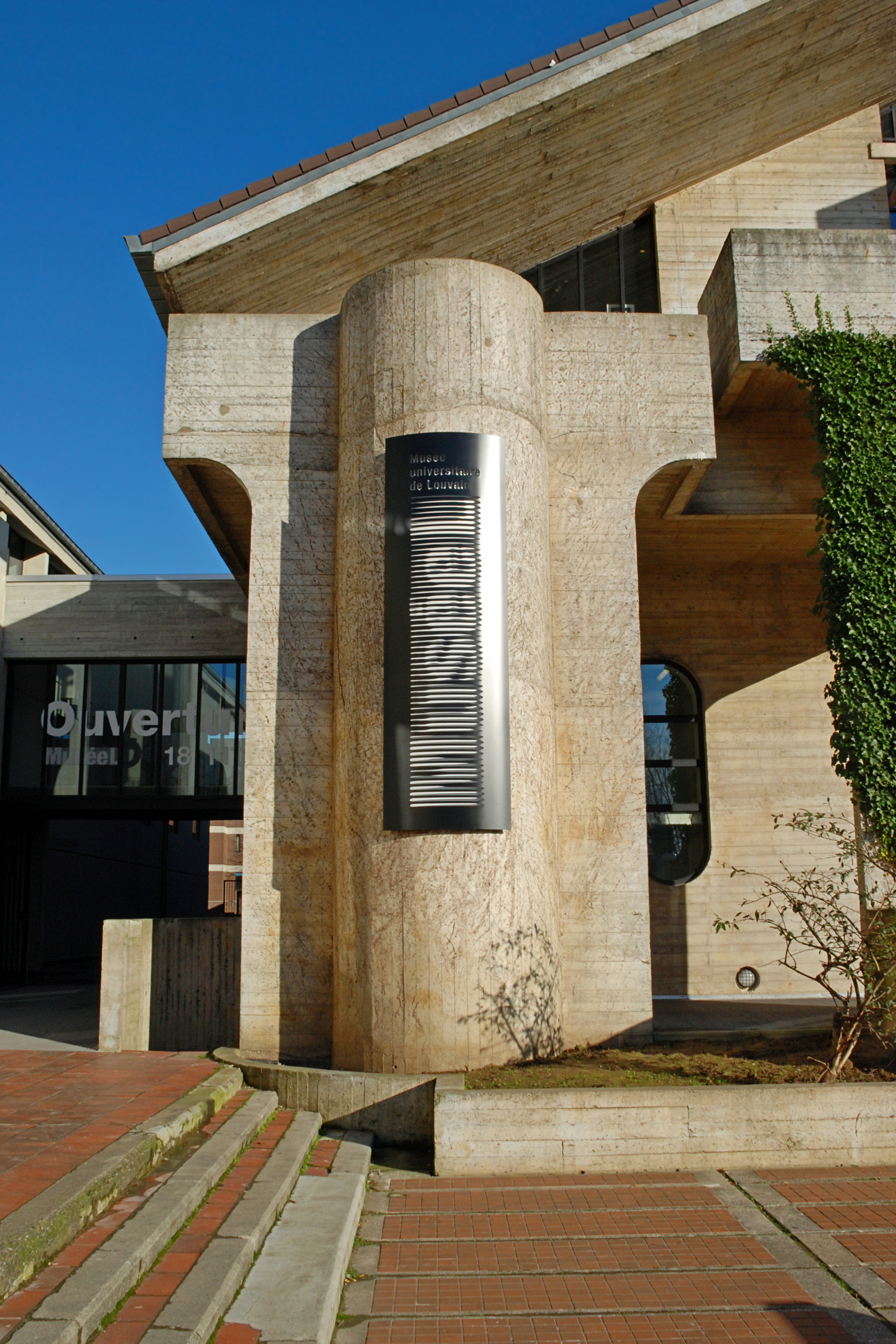
The building's columns.

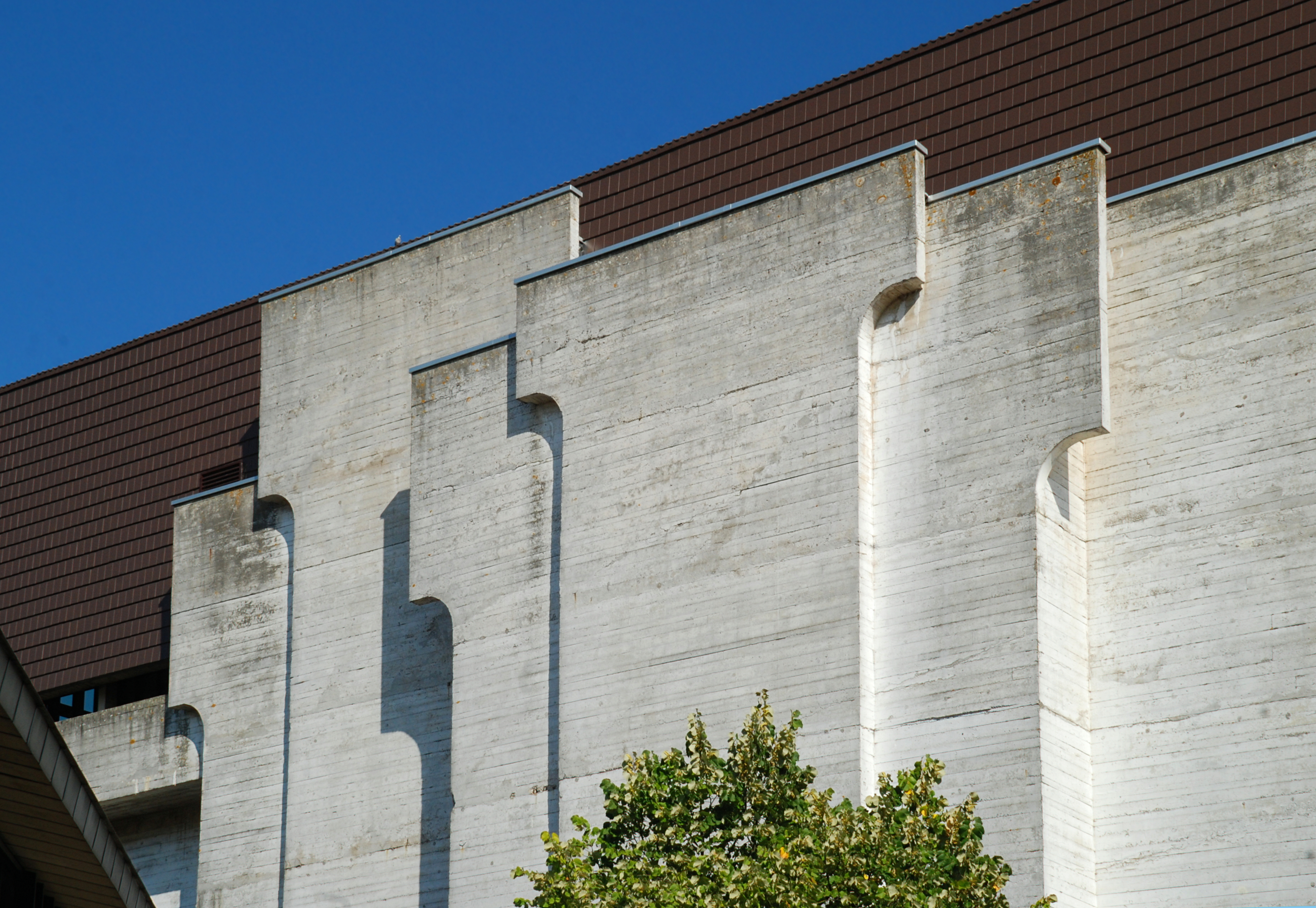
The Pilasters of the old Sciences and Technology Library, which lead to the museum's name.

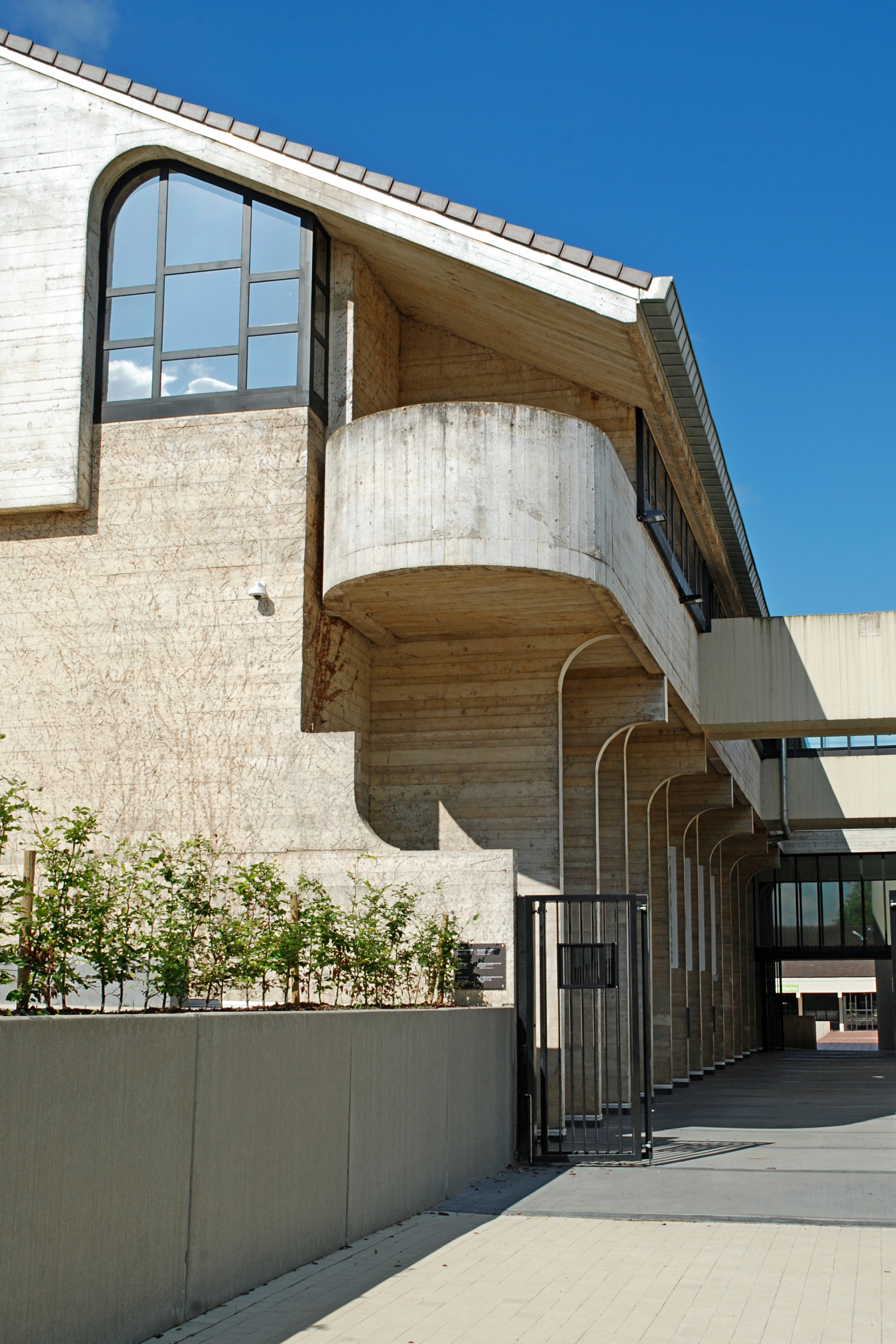
Access to Musée is via the rear facade.

=== Collections history ===
The history of the museum's collections can be divided into three phases:

First, from 1835 to the 1960s, there was no unified museum but the faculties of the Catholic University of Louvain has vast collections, including works from classical and Christian antiquity, casts of works from Antiquity and the Middle Ages, zoological collections, mineral and fossil collections and collections relating to the ethnology of the Belgian Congo:

- 1864: creation of the Archaeological Museum of Louvain by Canon Edmond Reusens.
- 1905: collection of the first objects of Greek and Roman archaeology.
- 1909: constitution of an archaeology collection at the Faculty of Theology (creating the Bible Museum).
- 1914: founding of an African ethnography collection about Belgian Congo for the Institute of Commerce and a collection of classical antiquities.
- 1922: acquisition of a large proportion of Susan Minns' Danse Macabre collection
- 1920–1935: installation of the Museum of Christian art, the Museum of Classical Art and the Museum of Egyptian and Oriental Art in Louvain's University Hall.

In 1966, two years before the split of the Catholic University of Louvain into a French-speaking and a Dutch-speaking entity, an important legacy of the Brussels industrialist Frans Van Hamme composed of sculptures and paintings from the 14@th to the 18@th century called for the creation of a museum.

After the 1968 university split, the Museum of Louvain-la-Neuve was founded, whose collections were enriched over time:

- 1975: donation by Abbot Adolphe Mignot of Greek, Etruscan and Southern Italian ceramics.
- 1986, 2004, 2005, 2008 and 2014: donation by Foundation for Contemporary Belgian Art founder Serge Goyens de Heusch of nearly 2,000 works of Belgian modern and contemporary art; Paintings and an archive collection on art in Belgium in the 20@th century.
- 1990: various bequest of Dr. Charles Delsemme.
- 1994: donation by the Eugène Rouir and Suzanne Lenoir foundation: more than 1,500 prints from the 15@th to the 20@th century.
- 1996 – 2010: donation by the Boyadjian family: naive art and popular piety.
- 2002: various donations of drawings by contemporary Belgian artists; of the Van Ooteghem legacy; donations from various artists.

Thirdly, during the transition period between the Museum of Louvain-la-Neuve and the Musée L, the collections were further enriched:

- 2013: clinical anthropology collection of Robert Steichen.
- 2015: calculating machine, donated by Luc de Brabandere.

== Description ==
=== Collections ===
On an area of 3,830 m^{2} accessible to the public, the Musée L presents a permanent exhibition of more than 800 pieces, chosen from among the 32,000 pieces in its reserve, which come from the collections of UCLouvain professors and significant private donations.

The collections cover fields as varied as printmaking (Dürer, Van Dyck, Goya, Rodin, Picasso...), Belgian 20@th century art (Magritte, Alechinski) and sculpture.

The museum does not only present works of art: it also presents the scientific collections of UCLouvain, consisting of specimens of natural history, archaeological and ethnographic objects or machines and inventions with a scientific vocation.

The collections are presented through five themes: "to be surprised, to question, to transmit, to be moved and to contemplate".

The museum also has temporary exhibitions and 1,200 m^{2} of inventory.

=== Laboratory for the study of works of art ===
The Laboratory for the Study of Works of Art, founded in the early 1960s by Professor Roger Van Schoute, has as its main objective the study of the museum's collection of easel paintings in order to improve expertise in conservation science and, in some cases, with preventive conservation projects.

It also offers an expert consultant service to private individuals.

=== Public infrastructure ===
The museum's facilities also include a library, a seminar room, two educational areas, a bookshop, a restaurant, a tea room and a picnic area.

An auditorium called Yves & Rainy du Monceau was inaugurated in May 2018.

The museum houses workshop spaces that allow school and other audiences to exercise their creativity.

== Affiliations ==
The Musée L is a member of several organisations:

- French-speaking association of Belgian museums
- International Council of Museums
- International committee "University museums and collections"
- Museums and society in Wallonia organisation
- International Association for the Conservation and Promotion of Mouldings
