= Biéreau Farm =

Monument in Louvain-la-Neuve, Belgium

- La Ferme du Biéreau
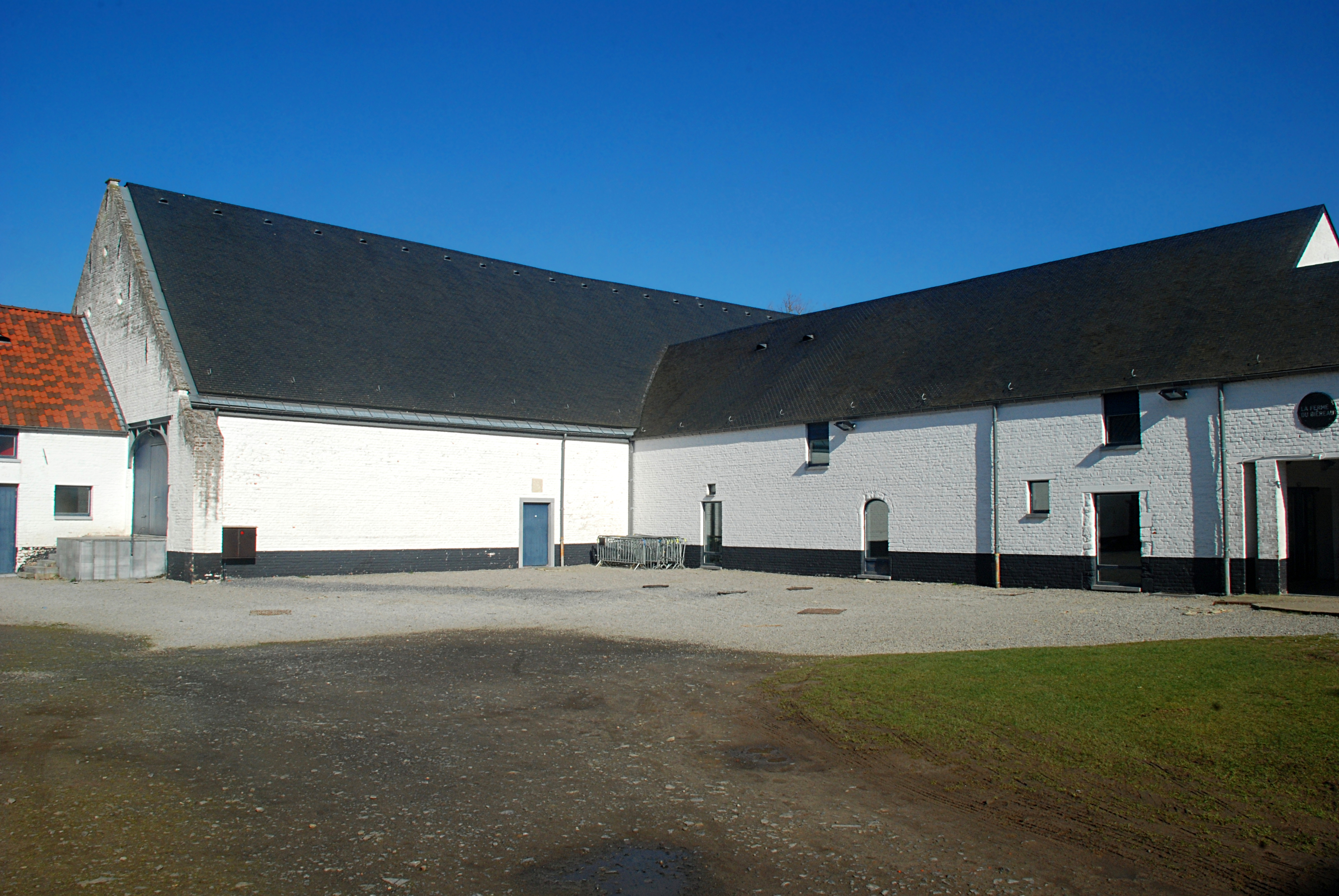
- The farmyard
- Interactive map of Biéreau Farm
- Location: Louvain-la-Neuve
- Coordinates: 50°39′58″N 04°37′03″E
- Type: Brabantine farm
- Dedicated to: Musical centre
- Website: http://www.fermedubiereau.be/

Biéreau Farm (French: Ferme du Biéreau, formerly Cense du Bierwart) is an old Brabantine farm now turned into a cultural and musical centre. It is located in Louvain-la-Neuve, part of the municipality Ottignies-Louvain-la-Neuve, in the province Walloon Brabant in Belgium.

Like Lauzelle Farm (French: Ferme de Lauzelle), it gave its name to one of the four subdivisions of Louvain-la-Neuve.

== Location ==
The farm stands in the oldest district of the university city Louvain-la-Neuve, which is the Biéreau district, in the south of the city.

Located between the Scavée of Biéreau and the Jardin Botanique Avenue, it faces the concrete towers of the Faculty of Bioscience Engineering in the neighbourhood of the Lycée Martin V.

In front of the door, there is a large paved parking, bicycle parking, parking spots for disabled people and shared vehicles as well as a kiss and ride.

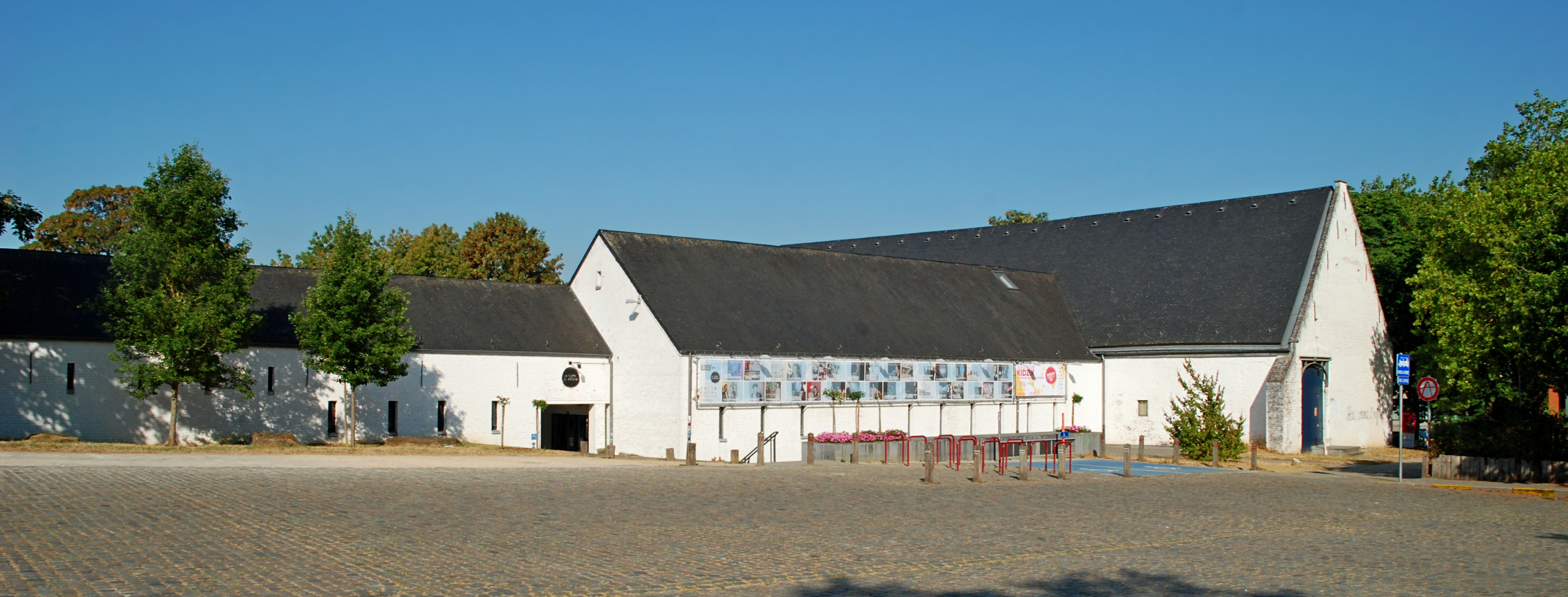
East view of the farm.

== Toponymy ==
The Walloon word "Biéreau" appeared in the 15th century as "Bierwart" and means "beautiful view" or "beautiful eyes". It comes from two Walloon words: "bia", meaning beautiful, and "rwârt", meaning look or gaze.

== History ==
=== Origins ===
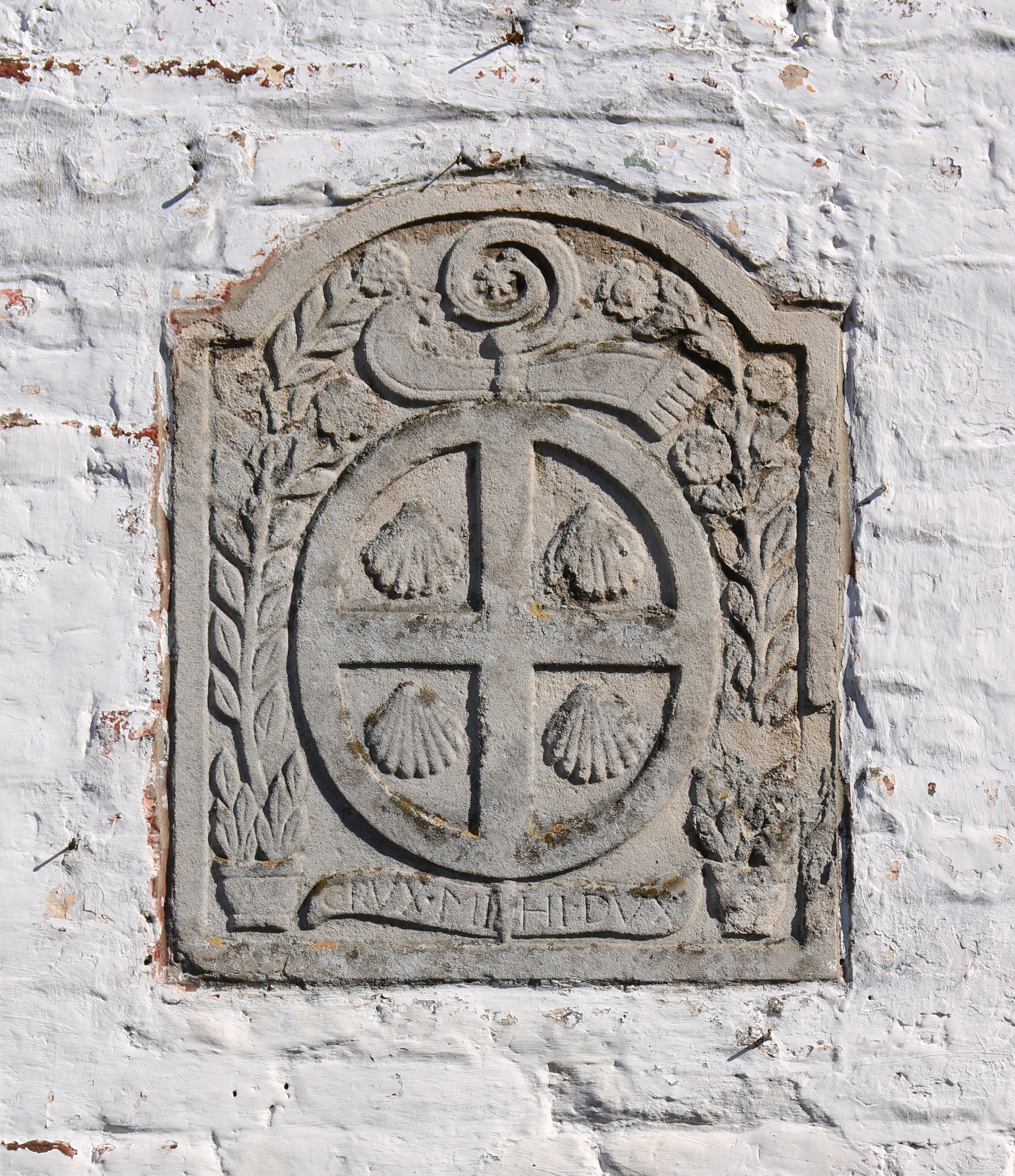
Coat of arms of Anne Josèphe de la Croix, abbess of Florival.

This Brabantine farm dating back to the 12th century and named in sources from 1601 was the property of Florival Abbey in the Belgian town of Archennes (part of the municipality of Grez-Doiceau) for more than six centuries: the coat of arms of Anne Josèphe de la Croix, abbess from 1733 to 1749, still stands proudly on the farm's corps de logis. In 1991, the four scallop shells, standing for Louvain-la-Neuve, were used for the crest of Ottignies-Louvain-la-Neuve, next to the symbols of the other sub-municipalities of Céroux, Limelette, Ottignies and Mousty. The crest bears in its centre the Saint Benedict Medal, which is an encircled cross, above the Latin expression: "Crux Mihi Dux", short for "Crux Sit Mihi Dux" (May the Holy Cross be my guide). The Saint Benedict Medal is embellished by four scallop shells and flanked by two high flowering plants.

Elsewhere, a stone engraved with the date "Anno 1722" is embedded above a door in the barn wall.

At the end of the Old Regime, the site covered 134 ha. It was sold as "nationalised property" by the French authorities on 26 January 1798, and had multiple owners before becoming Ernest Solvay's property in 1893. His heirs inherited the domain and then sold it to the Boël family.

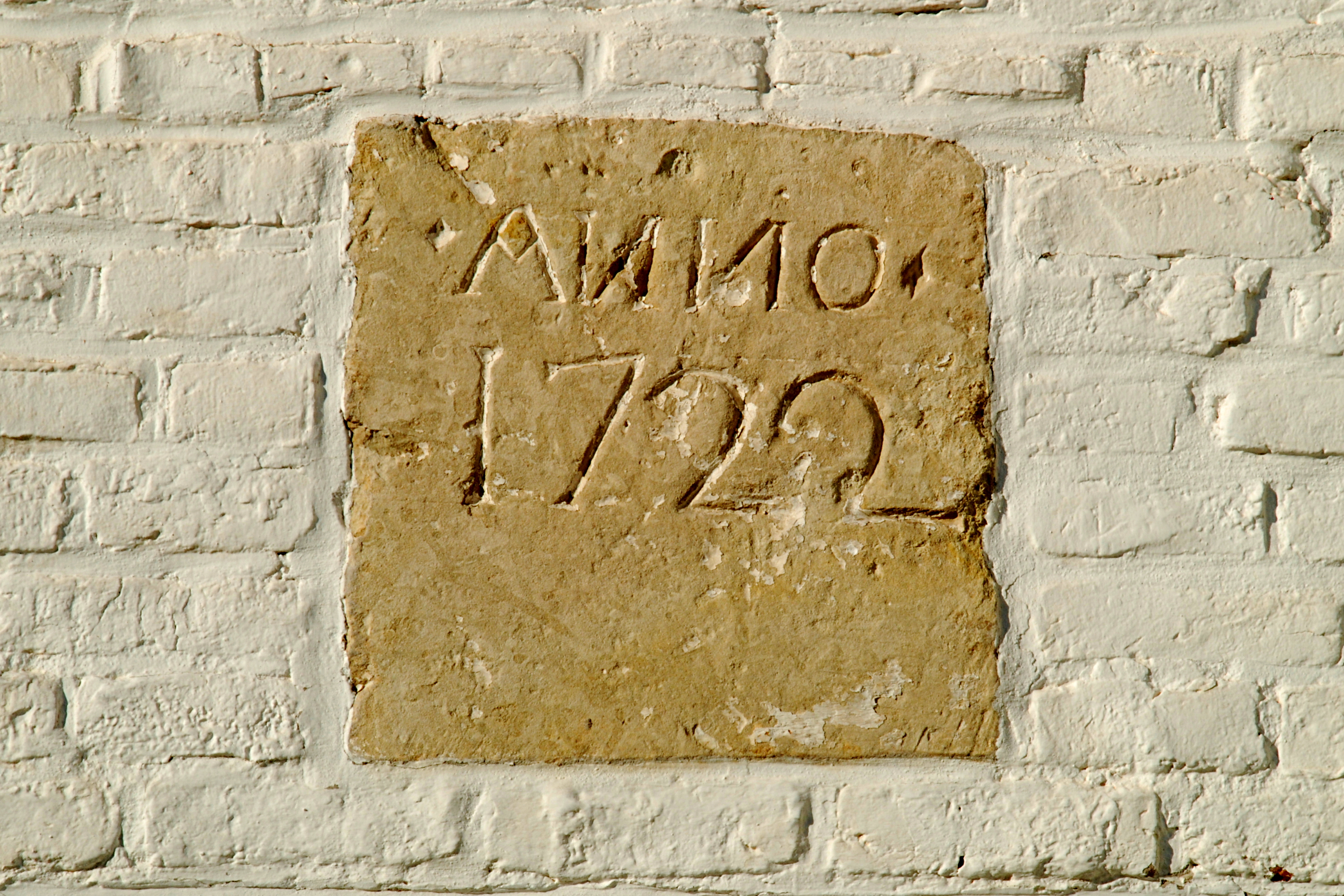
Date engraving "Anno 1722" decorating the barn.

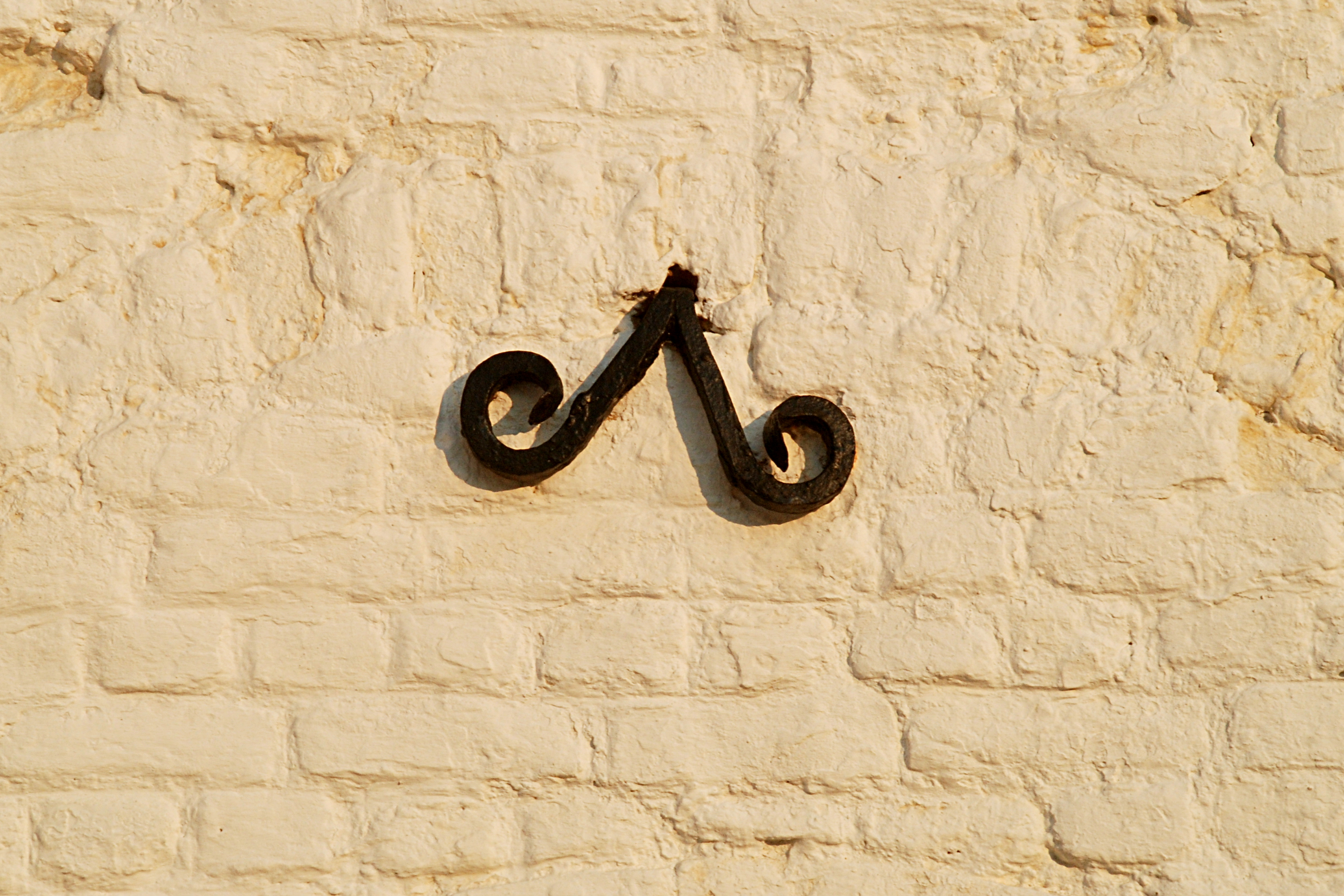
Anchor on the front of the corps de logis.

=== Integration into the university town of Louvain-la-Neuve ===
In 1969, the Boël family sold the farm to the Université catholique de Louvain. The farm stopped its agricultural activities in 1972, but the residents stayed until they were expropriated in 1977. It was then owned by the municipality of Ottignies-Louvain-la-Neuve.

When the city was created in 1972, the plans provided for the different farms of Louvain-la-Neuve to be devoted to arts: Blocry Farm (French: Ferme du Blocry) was chosen for theatre and now houses the Jean Vilar Theatre (French: l'Atelier théâtral Jean Vilar) while the Biéreau Farm was chosen for music.

=== Classification ===
Some of the farm buildings have been listed as built heritage since 27 December 1988: facades, roofs and their structures in the south-west part of the farm as well as its corps de logis and the entire barn, except for the pigsties flanking the barn on the farmyard side.

The farm is listed on the "Inventory of the immovable cultural heritage in the Walloon Region" (French: Inventaire du patrimoine culturel immobilier de la Région wallonne) with reference number 25121-INV-0030-02.

== Home for all musical genres ==
Atsugá in concert (2024)

Biéreau Farm is a cultural centre dedicated to music, also known as the "Home for all musical genres" (French: Maison de toutes les musiques). Its programming includes a range of musical styles, including world music, jazz, classical music, French variété, rap, and spiritual music.

Lots of concerts take place in the concert hall, which is in the barn. There are also festivals, like the musical festival for kids called "Kidzik, the festival for little ears" (French: Kidzik, le festival des petits oreilles) which is organized every year in August.

The musical middays called "Midzik" and musicology courses from the University of the Elderly (French: Université des Aînés).

The entrance and ticket office are installed in the restored stables.

== Public art around the Biereau Farm ==
In the small park between the farm and Avenue du Jardin Botanique there is an artwork called Concerto in blue (French: Concerto en bleu), made in 2001.

Jocelyne Aubin is the artist behind this piece made of 50 stone blocks. Upon one of those blocks, there is a bronze sculpture of a bow and sheet music. For this piece, the Breton artist, who in 1992 set up her workshop in the old forge of Biéreau Farm, was inspired by the legend of the fairy Melusine

Concerto en bleu

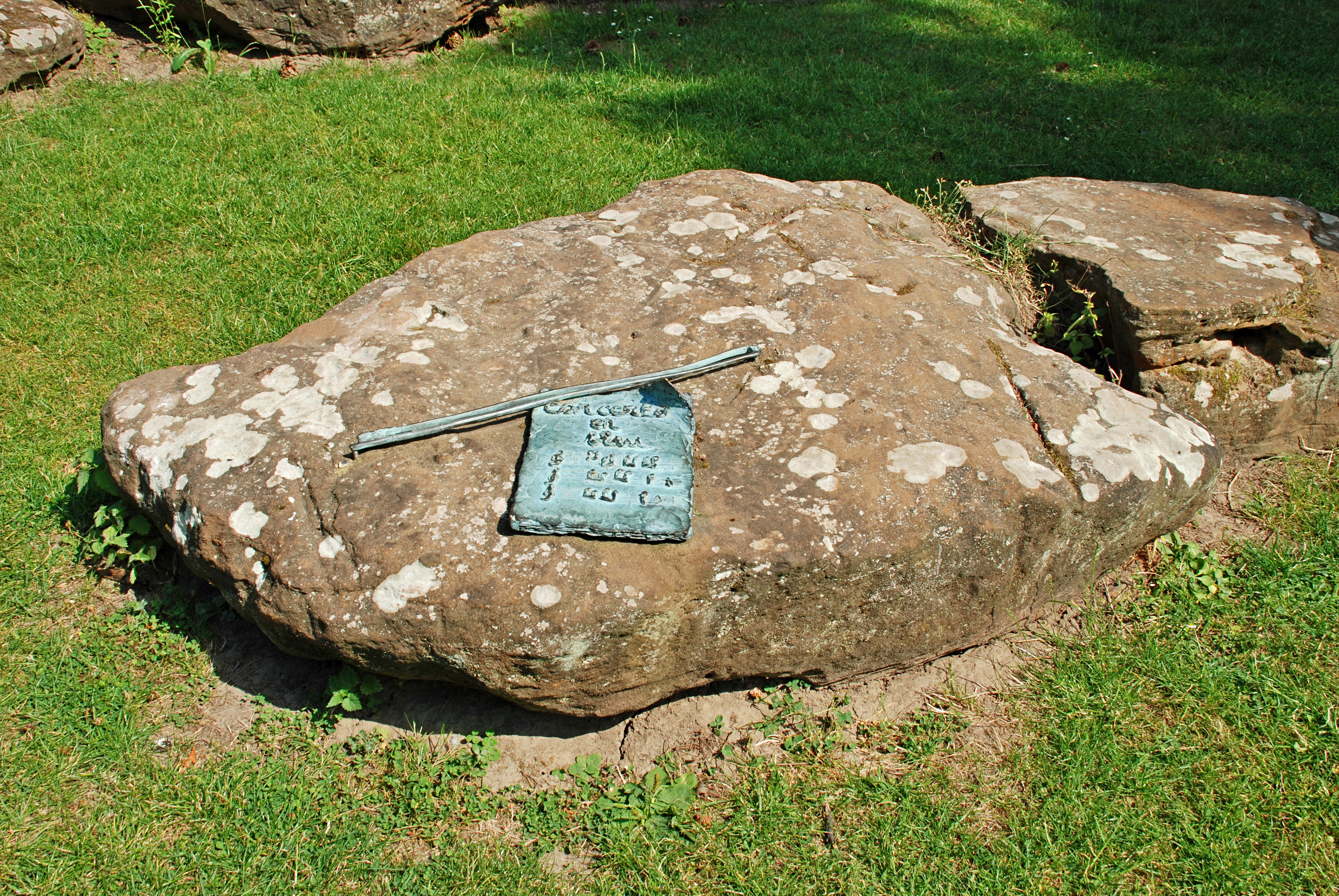

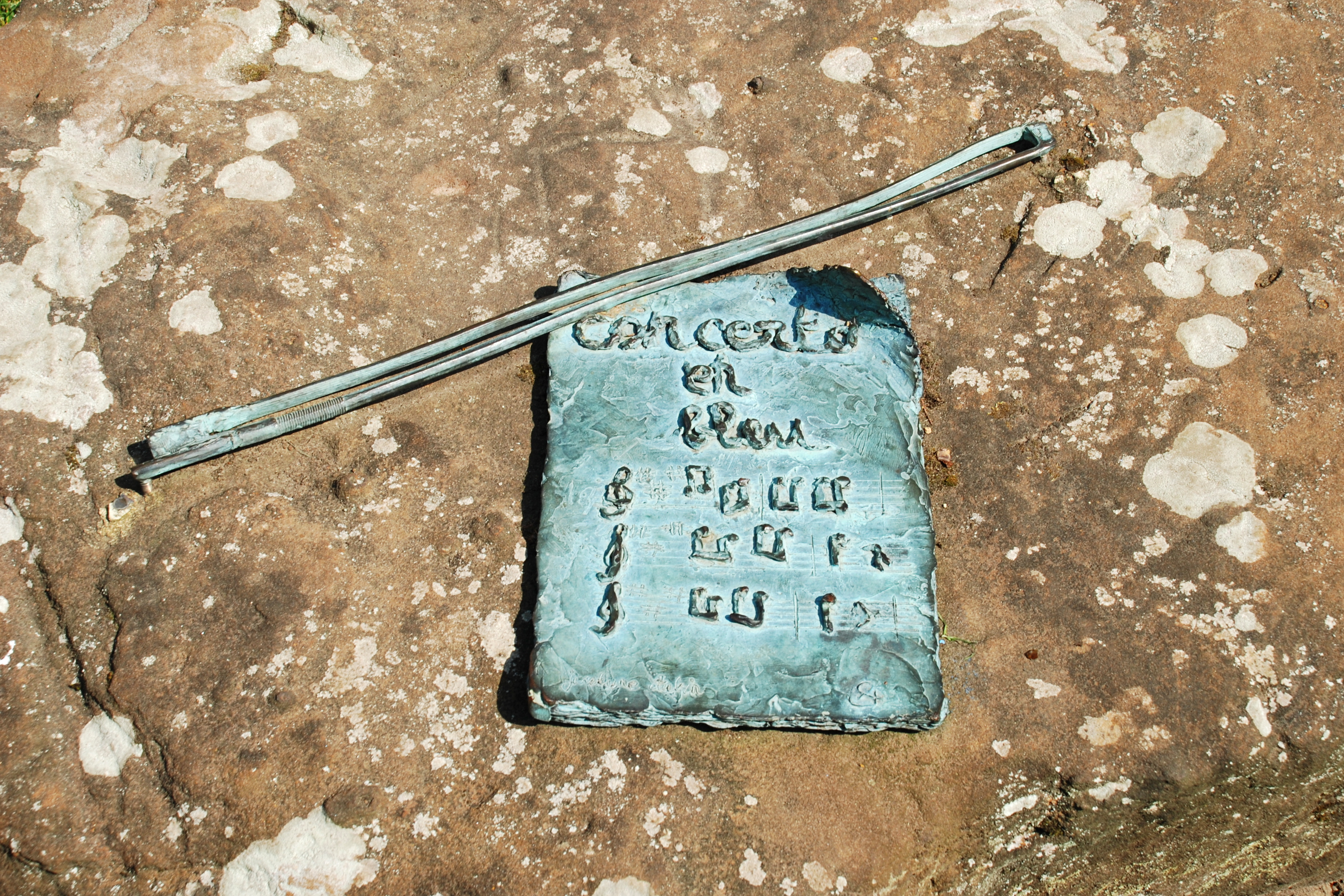

== See also ==
- Ottignies-Louvain-la-Neuve
- Louvain-la-Neuve
- Université catholique de Louvain
