= Philippe Samyn =

Belgian architect and engineer (1948–2026)

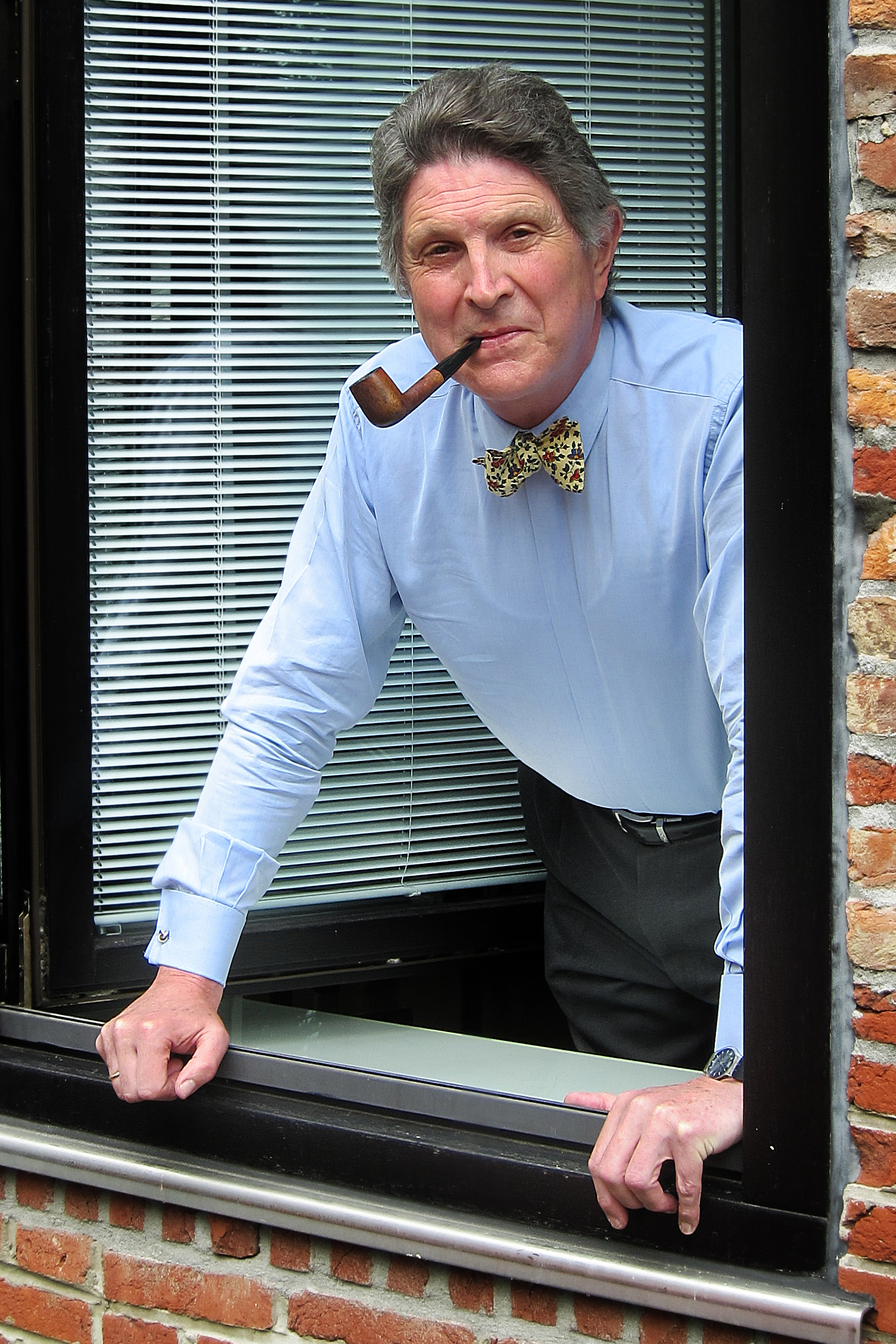
- Born: 1 September 1948; Ghent, Belgium
- Died: 24 May 2026 (aged 77)
- Occupation: Architect
- Buildings: Europa building, Brussels; Aula Magna, Louvain-la-Neuve

Philippe Samyn (1 September 1948 – 24 May 2026) was a Belgian architect, engineer, and urbanist. He was the creator of over 686 projects, 250 of which are built. His architecture is characterized by a holistic approach, investigating new ways of construction focused on efficiency between the material, the shape, the function, and the energy needed in the making and functioning of the building.

Morphology and the study of shapes was a central component in his process. His architecture is distinguished by a privileged use of wood in an unusual way, of glass and steel, but also of recovered materials, forming an architecture in which geometry supports the qualities of the material. He defended the concept of the “efficiency” of materials, leaning the rational use of their properties. His process went against those who produce structures which are expensive, fragile, or excessive use of material structures. His technological and structural research which are in favour of a durable use of materials was acknowledged in 2008 by a Global Award for Sustainable Architecture.

== Early life and academic background ==
Philippe Samyn grew up between Ghent and Afnee (a small village close to the city) until he was 14 years old. He attended school at Koninklijke Atheneum de la Voskenlaan. He then moved to Brussels with his family where he attended school at the Athénée Ixelles. His father, Edouard Samyn, was a self-taught engineer and inventor, his mother, Isaline Delmotte, was a painter. At a very early age they introduce him to technology, sciences, art, travel and working with material. All of these play a fundamental role in his personal and professional life.

In 1966, he enrolled at the Free University of Brussels (ULB), where he obtained a diploma in civil engineering in 1971. During this time, in 1970, he also obtained a certificate in computer programming, which shows his early interest in data computerisation and his awareness of the importance of this tool in his career. He also obtained a diploma in urban engineering in 1973. The same year he acquired a Master of Science in Civil Engineering at the Massachusetts Institute of Technology (MIT). In 1985, he enrolled in a post-graduate programme in management at Solvay Business School and obtained his architecture diploma from the State jury. He then proceeded to become a doctor in applied sciences at the University of Liège in 1995.

Along with his builder activity, Philippe Samyn taught at the Superior National School of Visual Arts at La Cambre, where he carried out construction classes. He also taught at the Applied Sciences Faculty at the Vrije Universiteit Brussel and the University of Mons until 2006.

On 30 June 2020, Samyn stepped down as the administrator of his agency and transferred his responsibilities to two of his associates: Åsa Decorte and Ghislain André. However, he kept his role of main designer. Released from all managerial responsibilities, he focused on what really matters to him: discovery, invention, and conception. A new page turned in career, with the creation of projects stemming from the synthesis of knowledge accumulated and of fresh prospects. Throughout this period, he created freely.

== Beginning of his career ==
Samyn kicked-off his career with an internship within Albert De Doncker’s architectural and urbanistic agency (1972–1974). During this time, he also worked part-time as a calculation engineer within the engineering agency Verdeyen & Moenaert.

In 1975, he became Albert De Doncker’s associate, from whom he undertook the entirety of the projects at the end of his career in 1978. A significant project from this era, among others, is la Maison Boulanger in Ohain (1976–1979) which already illustrates the unique character of his constructions.

== Philippe Samyn and Partners ==
=== Description ===
In 1978, Philippe Samyn established his first personal office in the house he had just built on Avenue Hyppolite Boulenger in Uccle. Two years later, in 1980, he founded Samyn and Partners. During the early years, his engineering expertise honed his knowledge while establishing a reputation for seriousness and reliability in the industrial world. Simultaneously, he developed his career as an architect through more personal projects, refining his approach. He avidly followed architectural publications and journals, especially those from English-speaking countries, as well as German, Dutch, Scandinavian, and others. He was interested in the Arup group and the architecture of Louis Kahn, whose influence could be seen in some of his works at the time. However, it was primarily Christian Van Deuren, his friend, architect, and associate, who helped him structure his architectural thinking. From this period, notable projects include the Royal Athenaeum of Waterloo (1980–1984), the Athenaeum of Leuze-en-Hainaut (1980–1983), the primary section of the Royal Athenaeum of Athus (1981–1984), and the Shell Research Centre in Louvain-la-Neuve (1986–1992), which marked a significant milestone for Samyn et Associés. Shell was indeed an essential step for Philippe Samyn, demonstrating his agency's capabilities to successfully manage large-scale and highly technical projects. Other industrial commissions allowed him to formalize his research, applying his engineering knowledge to create rational yet aesthetic architecture. The works from this period were distinguished by a thorough study of geometry, notably in the Athenaeum of Athus, where rigor, calculation, economy, and geometry came together to create a humanistic space.

Projects from these early years were characterized by frequent use of brick. However, after Shell, Philippe Samyn abandoned the use of brick as a primary material due to its declining quality, caused by reduced firing temperatures and cooking times following the first oil crisis. Brick only appeared sporadically in his architecture as a structural element, never as a facade.

=== The 1990s: Early experiments ===
In 1991, Philippe Samyn inaugurated a research laboratory for the company M&G in Venafro, Italy. It consisted of a large tent placed in a rectangular basin, featuring large, pointed arches connected by cables, supporting a polyester-coated PVC fabric.

In the Brussimmo office building (1989–1993) constructed for the Sidmar-Arbed Group in Brussels, after having built the OCAS research centre in Zelzate for them, he implemented the double-skin principle for the first time in one of his projects. To optimize this approach, he used fluid mechanics software.

In 1992, he completed the Walloon Forestry Equipment Store in Marche-en-Famenne (1992–1995). Here, he used local wooden poles with variable cross-sections, each with a corresponding radius of curvature. With engineer Elie Mas from Portal, he designed an envelope consisting of glass tiles held by whalebone-like cast aluminium fittings attached to extruded aluminium profiles.

In 1994, he designed the first petrol station for the Fina Europe Group, followed by many others. The twin stations at the Wanlin area in Houyet (1994–1995) in the province of Namur marked a significant milestone in his career. Here, he employed the pre-stressed fabric technique developed by Ferrari in Lyon, adding architectural dimension to spaces typically lacking in it.

In 1999, at the Houten service station in the Netherlands (1998–1999), Philippe Samyn experimented for the first time with expanded metal, using it in a structure with a series of curved screens.

=== 21st century ===
The firm continued to manage projects in Belgium and internationally, applying the theoretical frameworks developed in Samyn’s research. The practice emphasizes a constructive approach based on an analysis of construction parameters rather than a specific aesthetic style. This methodology integrates site-specific factors (genius loci), energy efficiency, material usage, and durability. The firm utilizes engineering-based tools to inform the design and functional requirements of the building process.

The year 2000 is marked by the development of the roof covering for the Leuven station.

In 2005, another turning point occurred in the builder's career: the Samyn and Partners association, Studio Valle Progettazioni, and Buro Happold won an international competition for the construction of the headquarters of the European Council and the Council of the European Union in Brussels, named "Europa." Samyn and Partners assumed the role of the "lead and design partner" and handled engineering through its subsidiaries. Europa was a pinnacle in Samyn and Partners history, the result of many years of previous research. Several recurring elements from the architect's work were present: the use of recycled materials (all wooden frames), photovoltaic panels, double skin, geometric exploration, collaboration with an artist (Georges Meurant, colourist painter), play with opacity and transparency, porous architecture allowing visual appropriation by all. The international dimension of the firm was confirmed with commissions in Russia, Italy, Finland, China, and more.

In 2010, the construction of the AGC Glass Europe headquarters in Louvain-la-Neuve provided an opportunity to implement the system of sintered glass louvers with alternating bands. Perpendicular to the sun, they allowed for both solar protection and a source of natural light. He had previously invented a similar process for the unrealized project of ENI's new headquarters in Rome in 1998.

Also in 2010, following his meeting with Chinese architect Wang Shu during the Global Award for Sustainable Architecture ceremony where Philippe Samyn was honoured, he received several commissions in China. Among them was a cultural café in Lujiazhi (Zoushan) inaugurated in 2018.

In 2012, in the project of the Charleroi Fire Brigade barracks (2012–2016), he used perforated sheet metal for the first time to resist shear forces, following numerous tests to determine the material's resistance to different types of loads. The profiled galvanized steel sheet was also used on the façade of this circular building.

== Death ==
Samyn died on 24 May 2026, at the age of 77.

== Theoretical work ==
Inventions and discoveries punctuate the builder's career. One of the guiding principles of his work is the rational use of material properties and their optimization through geometry.

=== Doctorate Thesis on the indicators of volume and displacement ===
Philippe Samyn developed a calculation method to address the absence of tools to shape a structure and the need to minimize the amount of material used in construction. He earned a doctorate in applied sciences from the University of Liège on 15 December 1999. This theory was later completed by material indicators, which is the ratio of the energy required to produce one cubic meter of material to the stress it can withstand. A high-performing volume indicator may be undermined by the material indicator. Considering all parameters is essential to find the best balance.

=== QuCoCoMa (What how to build now? Why?) ===
For several years, Samyn worked on a book that synthesised the fundamentals of the art of construction: "QuCoCoMa (What How to Build Now? Why?)". This monumental project threads a path through the labyrinth of the multiple parameters that influence the art of building meaningful constructions.

=== Research and Development ===
On behalf of Fabricom, a subsidiary of the Suez Group, Samyn studied a new concept for a lightweight, visually refined wind turbine. Using the method of volume indicators, he developed a notably light turbine mast supported by folded stay cables. This design allowed the mast to be fully equipped with the turbine and blades at ground level before being raised using the turbine’s own cables. The approach reduced the need for heavy lifting equipment and made installation possible in locations with limited access.

=== For a "utopethic" urbanism: The vertical city ===
From 1972, he was developing the idea of vertical cities. His approach to tower buildings developed an original concept where architecture no longer serves as a clear boundary between the interior and exterior but becomes a porous space. It can accommodate natural elements, streets, squares, while also hosting spaces dedicated to specific functions such as housing, commerce, hospitality, etc.

The motivations behind this research include population explosion, rural exodus to coastal cities in emerging countries, energy scarcity, soil pollution, and long-term biodiversity preservation.

Ethical considerations are a major pillar of his approach. He called it an "utopethic" approach to vertical urbanism.

To date, this concept has not been fully realized. However, the project for the Positec company's headquarters, named "Sun Machine," in Suzhou, China (2019), represents a simplified version. The headquarters is a "vertical village" formed by a hollow annular tower spanning 20 levels of 4.5 meters in height, primarily composed of voids.

== Some notable achievements ==
(for a complete list, visit www.samynandpartners.com)

- House for Mr. and Mrs. Boulanger in Ohain (1977)
- Royal Athenaeum in Athus (1981)
- Dr. Farr's House in Rhode-Saint-Genèse (1984)
- Design Board – Behaeghel & Partners (1985)
- Shell Belgium Chemical Research Center in Louvain-la-Neuve (1986)
- Thompson Aircraft Tire Corporation (1987)
- Fina Research – Petrofina in Feluy (1988)
- Boulanger Office in Waterloo (1988)
- OCAS Steel Application Research Center in Zelzate (1989)
- Brussimmo Office Building in Brussels (1989)
- Water Tower in Nouakchott, Mauritania (1989)
- M&G Research in Venafro, Italy (1991)
- Renovation of Radio Flagey Building in Brussels (1991)
- First-year Medical School Auditorium for ULB in Brussels (1992)
- Wallonia Forestry Equipment Store in Marche-en-Famenne (1992)
- Erasme Metro Station in Brussels (1992)
- Editions Dupuis Headquarters in Marcinelle (1986)
- Sans-Souci Hospital in Brussels (1993 - )
- Aula Magna in Louvain-La-Neuve (1993)
- Rogier Tower in Brussels (1993)
- Restaurant for the Petrofina Company in Brussels (1994)
- Smithkline Beecham Biologicals SA in Rixensart (1994)
- Princesse Astrid Hall at Heysel in Brussels (1994)
- Groenhof Castle in Malderen (1997)
- Total Fina Service Stations in Houten, Netherlands (1997)
- Total Fina Service Station in Nivelles (1997)
- Eversite Office Building in Brussels (1998)
- Fire Brigade Barracks in Houten, Netherlands (1998)
- Offices for Compagnie Immobilière Wallonne in Nivelles (1998)
- Fire Brigade Barracks in Enschede (2003)
- Glass Center in Lommel (2004)
- Extension of the Jan Denul Company Headquarters (2000-2005)
- Headquarters of the European Council and the Council of the European Union (2005)
- Saint-Amand College Tower in Kortrijk (2006)
- Euro Space Center in Libin-Transinne (2006)
- Vesuvio Railway Station for High-Speed Trains in Naples, Italy (2008- )
- Fire Brigade Barracks in Charleroi (2009)
- Faculty of Applied Sciences at ULB – La Plaine Campus in Brussels (2009- )
- Lujiazhi Cultural Creativity Garden in Zoushan, China (2010- )
- AGC Europe Headquarters in Louvain-la-Neuve (2010)
- European Space Agency in Redu (2015)
- Province of Namur Cultural Center known as "Le Delta" in Namur (2015)
- Andromeda, Antarctic University at the South Pole (2015- )
- Arctic Theater in Rovaniemi, Finland (2015- )
- Administrative Building for the Province of Namur (2017)
- Matuvu Square in Knokke-Heist (2017- )
- Positec Company Headquarters in Suzhou, China (2019- )

== Honors ==
- Commander of the Order of Leopold (2 November 2007) with seniority from 8 April 2006.
- Grand Officer of the Order of the Crown (29 February 2016) with seniority from 8 April 2011.
- Hereditary nobility and the personal title of knight, granted by King Philippe in 2014.

== Academic functions ==
- Royal Academy of Sciences, Letters, and Fine Arts of Belgium: corresponding member from 1992 to 2004, full member from 2004 to 2015, associated member since 2015.
- SECO SA (National Bureau for Technical Control of Construction): Member of the Board of Directors (1992–2017).
