= Ottignies-Louvain-la-Neuve =

City in Walloon Brabant province, Wallonia, Belgium

Ottignies-Louvain-la-Neuve Ocgniye-Li Noû Lovén (Walloon)
- Municipality
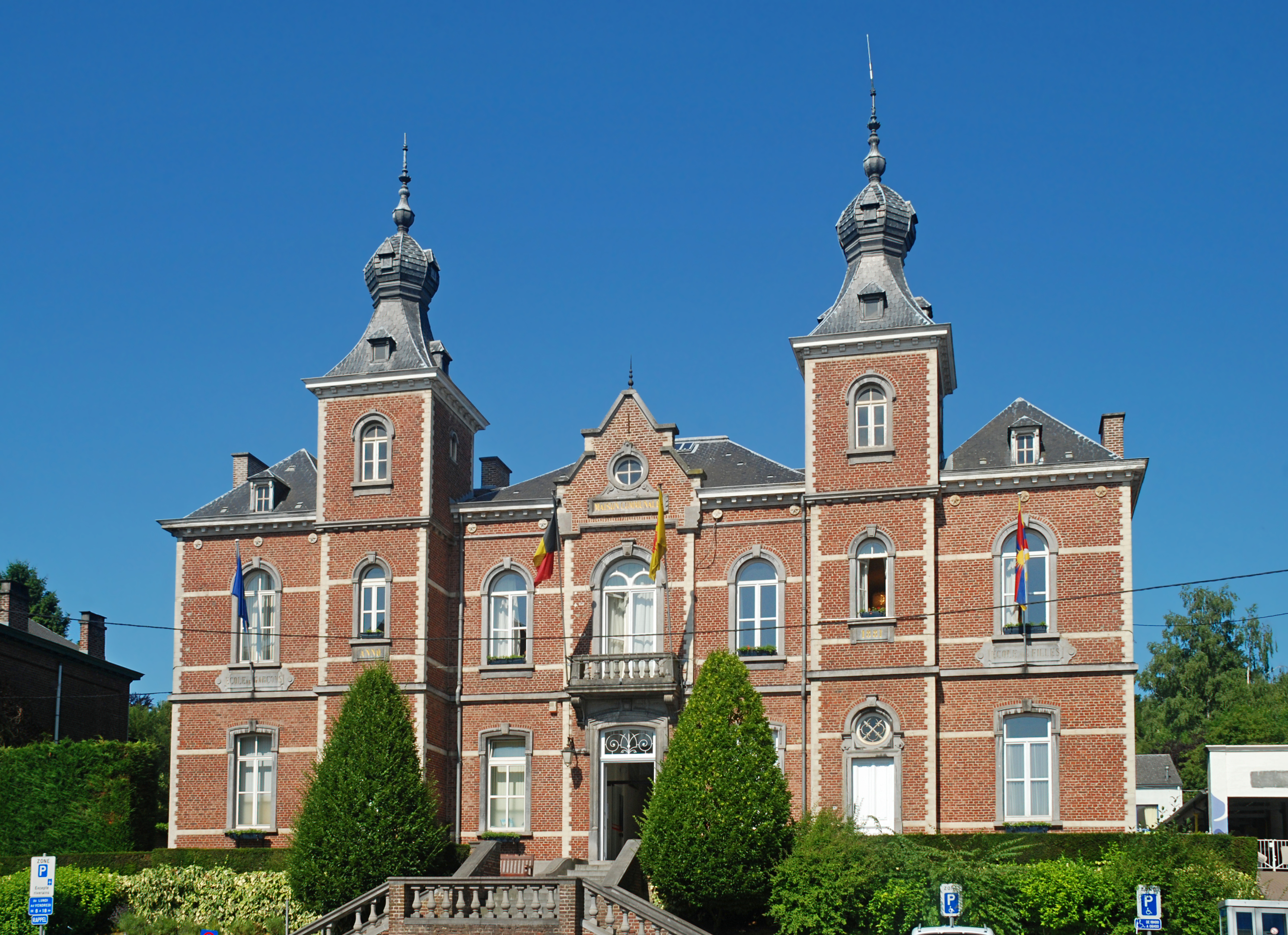
- The Town Hall

- Flag Coat of arms

- The municipality of Ottignies-Louvain-la-Neuve in Walloon Brabant
- Interactive map of Ottignies-Louvain-la-Neuve
- Location in Belgium
- Coordinates: 50°40′N 04°30′E
- Country: Belgium
- Community: French Community
- Region: Wallonia
- Province: Walloon Brabant
- Arrondissement: Nivelles

Government
  - Mayor: Julie Chantry (Ecolo)
  - Governing party: Ecolo-Avenir-PS

Area
  - Total: 33.4 km^{2} (12.9 sq mi)

Population (2018-01-01)
  - Total: 31,385
  - Density: 940/km^{2} (2,430/sq mi)
- Postal codes: 1340-1342, 1348
- NIS code: 25121
- Area codes: 010
- Website: www.olln.be

Ottignies-Louvain-la-Neuve (French pronunciation: [ɔtiɲi luvɛ̃ la nœv]; Walloon: Ocgniye-Li Noû Lovén) is a municipality and city of Wallonia located in the Belgian province of Walloon Brabant. On January 1, 2006, Ottignies-Louvain-la-Neuve had a total population of 29,521. The total area is 32.96 km^{2} which gives a population density of 896 inhabitants per km^{2}.

The municipality consists of the following sub-municipalities: Ottignies, Louvain-la-Neuve, Céroux-Mousty, and Limelette. Louvain-la-Neuve (sometimes abbreviated as "LLN") is a new town developed from 1968 in order to provide a home for the University of Louvain (UCLouvain), the French-speaking part of the former Catholic University of Louvain on its separation from the Dutch-speaking part, which remained in the ancient city of Louvain (Leuven).

== Louvain-la-Neuve Science Park ==
Created in 1971, Louvain-la-Neuve Science Park is the first of its kind in Belgium and is the biggest one in Wallonia (the French-speaking part of Belgium). It covers 231 hectares (570 acres) spread over the area of the town of Ottignies-Louvain-la-Neuve and the municipality of Mont-Saint-Guibert (30 kilometres (19 mi) away from Brussels).

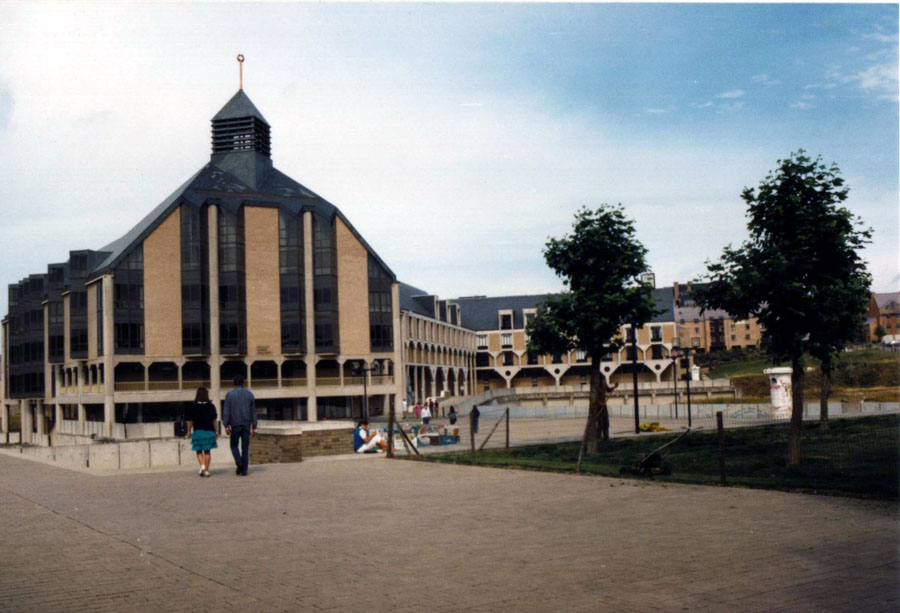
Faculty of Theology, Université catholique de Louvain

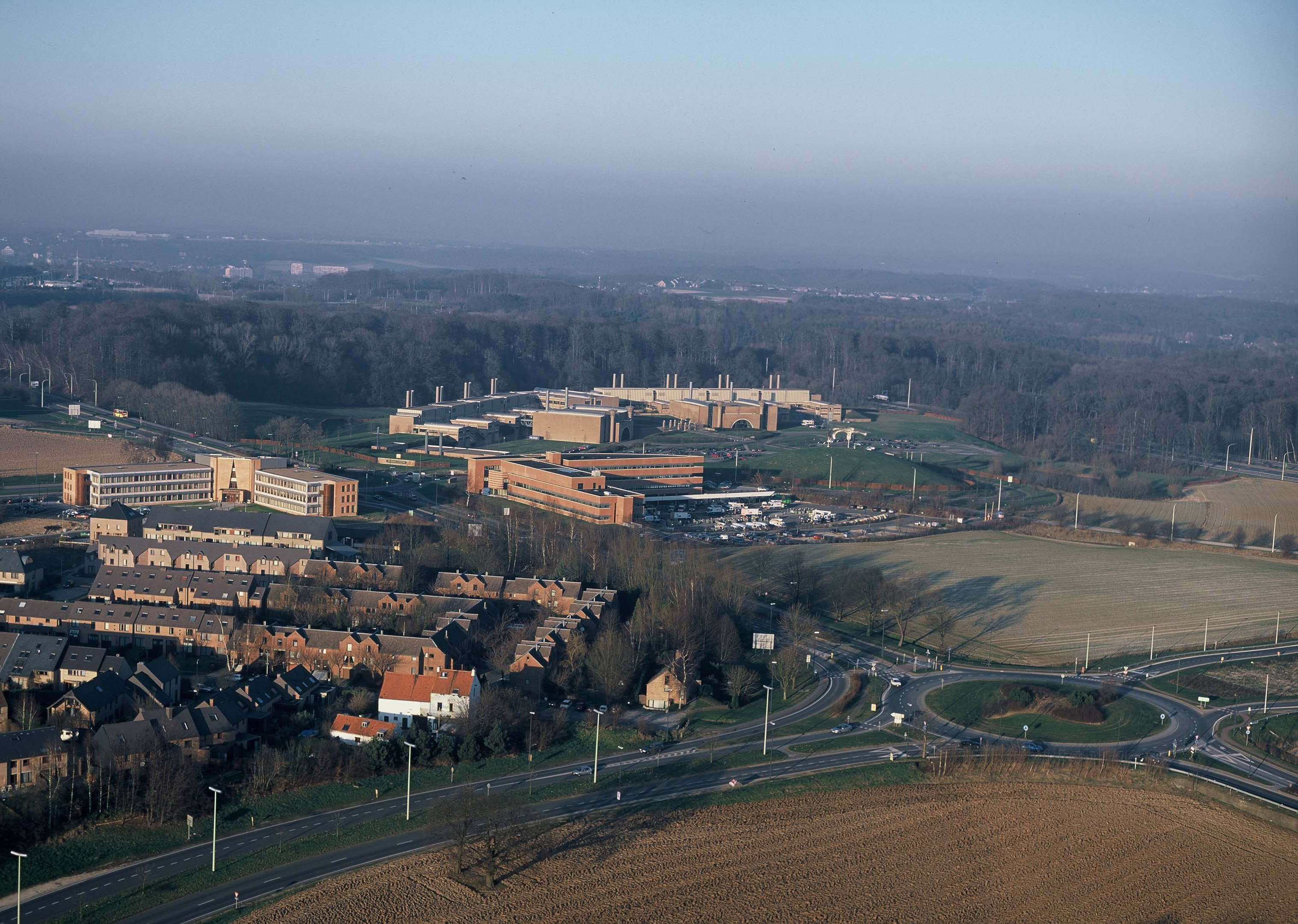
Louvain-la-Neuve Science Park

== Economy ==
The Lhoist group, world leader in the lime, dolime and mineral solutions, has its head office in Ottignies-Louvain-la-Neuve (Limelette).

== Transport ==
Ottignies-Louvain-la-Neuve is served by the railway stations Ottignies (an important interchange station and one of the busiest stations in Wallonia) and Louvain-la-Neuve.

== Sports ==
Ottignies-Louvain-la-Neuve is home to the Royal Ottignies Stimont football club (soccer) and the Rugby Ottignies Club (rugby).

== Notable people ==
- Noémie Mayombo (born 1991), basketball player
