= UCLouvain Charleroi =

University of Louvain site in Belgium

- Université catholique de Louvain
- Seal of UCLouvain.
- Other names: Maison Georges Lemaître
- Motto: Sedes Sapientiae (Latin)
- Motto in English: Seat of Wisdom, Seat of Knowledge
- Type: Free university (state funded)
- Established: 1966
- Parent institution: University of Louvain
- Affiliations: The Guild; CEMS; CESAER; CLUSTER; Coimbra Group; IMCC; TIME
- Rector: Vincent Blondel
- Students: 204
- Location: Charleroi, Belgium; 50°24′2″N 4°26′54″E
- Campus: Urban
- Colors: Louvain blue
- Nickname: Wolves
- Mascot: Woulfy
- Website: uclouvain.be/charleroi
- Data as of 2018

UCLouvain Charleroi is a campus of the University of Louvain in Charleroi, Belgium. Consisting of 3 faculties and a series of research centers and institutes, UCLouvain Charleroi consists of the Maison Georges Lemaître, in the center of the city, and a branch in Montignies-sur-Sambre.

It is one of the three UCLouvain sites in the Hainaut Province, along with UCLouvain FUCaM Mons and UCLouvain Tournai.

== History ==
During the Leuven crisis in the 1960s, a transfer of the French-speaking part of the Catholic University of Louvain from Leuven to Charleroi, one of Belgium's largest cities though without any university, is considered as one of the major alternatives to a relocation in Ottignies, which will later hold Louvain-la-Neuve.

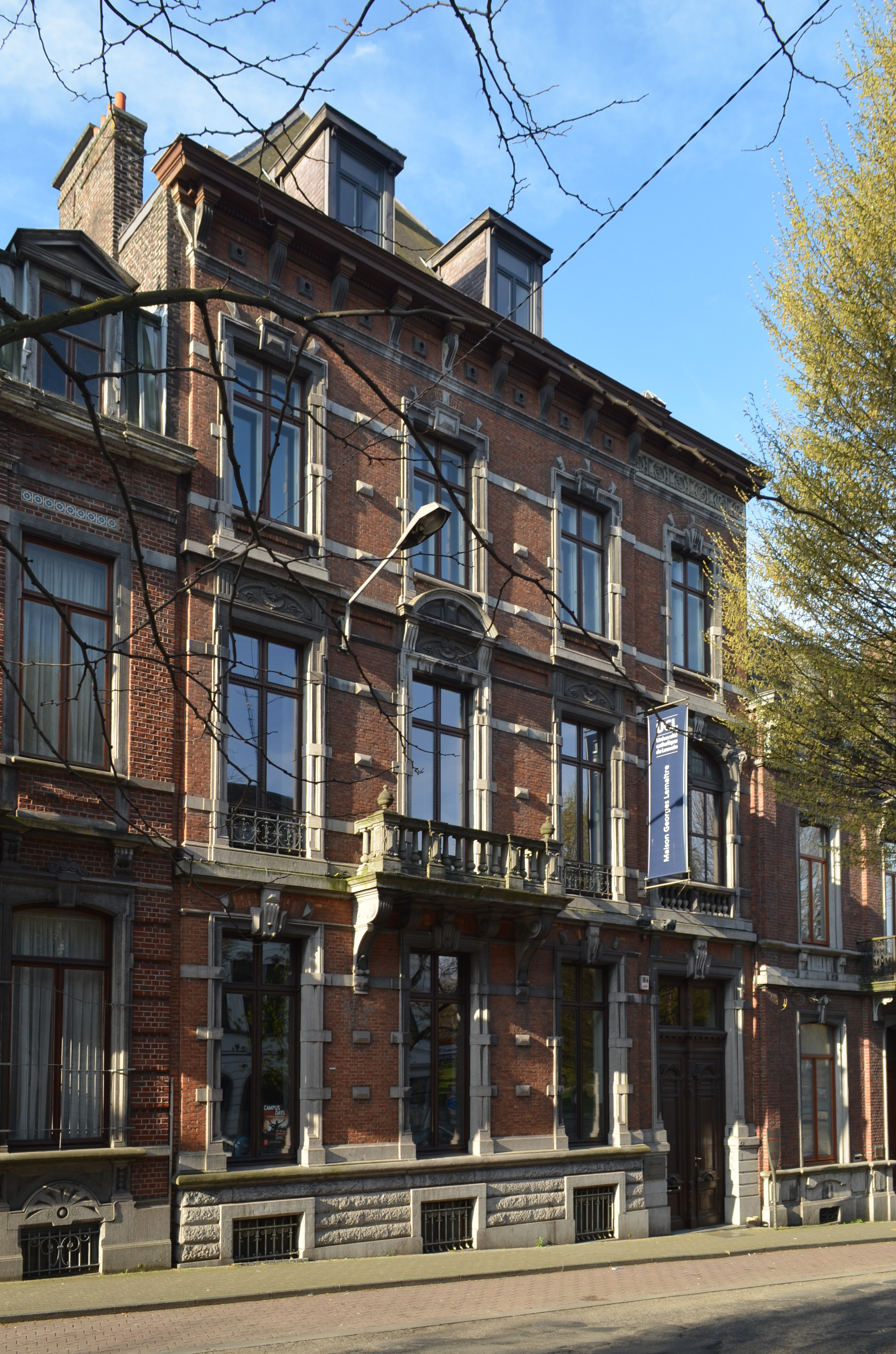
The Maison Georges Lemaître in the city center.

When the university is legally split in 1970, the Maison Georges Lemaître became property of the French-speaking University of Louvain. It is a large neo-Gothic mansion, designed by architect Auguste Cador. It is located on boulevard Devreux, a few dozen meters from the birthplace of Georges Lemaître, which was located rue du Pont Neuf 10. Georges Lemaître, the founder of the Big Bang Theory, was an alumnus of the Catholic University of Louvain.

Until 1995, courses of the University of Louvain Faculty of Economics, Social and Political Sciences and Communication in Charleroi were organised in the buildings of the Institut Saint-André, a secondary school located next to the Maison Georges Lemaître. A violent fire on 7 March 1995 ravaged the secondary school, which was rebuilt in 1997. UCLouvain thus completely renovated the Maison Georges Lemaître in 1995, and now concentrates most of its Caroloregian activity of teaching and research there.

In parallel and since 1975, the Catholic University Faculties of Mons (FUCaM), which were an independent university until 2011, have been offering programmes in economics and management sciences on the Sainte-Thérèse site of the Institut d'Enseignement secondaire complémentaire catholique (IESCA), in Montignies-sur-Sambre. Since 2005, following the founding of the Académie Louvain, these courses were integrated into the Louvain School of Management. In 2009, the Charleroi-Europe Catholic College (of which IESCA is a member) co-founded the Haute École Louvain en Hainaut, a partner college of UCLouvain. This merger was shortly followed by the merger of the FUCaM with the University of Louvain in 2011. These two institutions currently share the Montignies campus.

Since 2018, a third faculty has established itself in Charleroi: the Louvain School of Engineering. From 2020 onwards, it has been offering a bachelor's degree in computer science.

== Description ==
UCLouvain offers master's degrees and university diplomas in management and fiscal sciences on the Montignies site. Certificates in accounting and tax expertise exempt students from the entrance exams to the Belgian Institute of Company Auditors and the Institute of Chartered Accountants.

The Maison Georges Lemaître houses various research centres as well as the Open Faculty of Economic and Social Policy (FOPES), which is a department of the Faculty of Economic, Social, Political and Communication Sciences of UCLouvain (ESPO) and organises a master's degree in economic and social policy. It also serves as an exhibition centre and research centre for CIRTES, the Interdisciplinary Centre for Research on Work, the State and Society.

UCLouvain has also set up research centres at the Gosselies aeropole: the Centre of Excellence in Information Technology (CETIC) serving as a centre of expertise for the development of Walloon companies and founded by UCLouvain with the universities of Namur and Mons, as well as the Cenaero (Research Centre in Aeronautics) with the University of Liège and the Université libre de Bruxelles, an institute for the development of aeronautics and space industry.

In addition, the Gosselies cluster hosts three spin-offs from UCLouvain: Cedit, a technology company, and since 2011, iTeos, a farmaceutical company founded within the de Duve Institute at UCLouvain Brussels Woluwe and which raised a capital of 75 million US dollars in 2018, and Viridaxis, since 2011.

UCLouvain also participates in the Interuniversity Certificate in Energy Electronics organised by Thales Alenia Space at the Open University of the Wallonia-Brussels Federation, which is based in Charleroi.

=== Programmes ===
==== Open Faculty of Economic and Social Policy ====
- Master in economic and social policy

==== Louvain School of Management ====
- Master in Management Sciences
- Master in Management Sciences (60 ECTS)
- Master in Management sciences, specialising in taxation and expertise
- University diploma in personal taxation
- University diploma in corporate taxation
- University diploma in public accounting
- University diploma in advanced public accounting
- Inter-university diploma in digital transformation of businesses

==== Louvain School of Engineering ====
- Bachelor in Computer Science

==== Faculty of Theology ====
- University diploma in didactics of religious education

==== Faculty of Economic, Social and Political Sciences and Communication ====
- University diploma in transmedia (joint degree with the Institut des Arts de Diffusion and the University of Mons).

=== Research institutes ===
- CIRTES (Interdisciplinary Research Centre "Work, State and Society")
- Cenaero (Aeronautical Research Centre)
- CETIC (Centre of Excellence in Information Technology)
