= Louvain School of Engineering =

Belgian university faculty

- École polytechnique de Louvain
- Other names: EPL
- Former names: École des Mines et des Arts et Manufactures (1864); Faculté des Sciences appliquées (1961)
- Type: Public university faculty
- Established: 1864 (162 years ago)
- Parent institution: UCLouvain
- Affiliations: Conférence des Grandes écoles Guild of European Research-Intensive Universities; CESAER; CLUSTER; Coimbra Group; IMCC; TIME
- Rector: Vincent Blondel
- Students: 2100
- Location: Louvain-la-Neuve, Charleroi, Belgium; 50.668372°N 4.620832°E
- Colours: Louvain & EPL blue
- Website: uclouvain.be/epl

The Louvain School of Engineering or École polytechnique de Louvain (EPL) is a faculty of the University of Louvain, Belgium, founded in 1864. Known as the Faculty of Applied Sciences (Faculté des sciences appliquées) prior to 2008, it currently operates on the campuses of Louvain-la-Neuve and UCLouvain Charleroi.

== Description ==
The Louvain School of Engineering is one of the four components of the Science and Technology Sector (SST) of UCLouvain. The other three are the Faculty of Science (SC), the Faculty of Bioengineers (AGRO) and, since 2009, the Faculty of Architecture, Architectural Engineering and Urban Planning (LOCI).

The EPL organizes studies in civil engineering and computer science. Studies in architectural civil engineering are organized jointly with the LOCI Faculty of Architecture, Architectural Engineering and Urban Planning. These are LOCI's only studies organised in Louvain-la-Neuve instead of its Brussels (Saint-Gilles) and Tournai campuses. Together, the Louvain School of Engineering and LOCI hold 40% of Wallonia-Brussels Federation engineering students, making it the country's largest engineering school, by far.

The faculty headquarters are located in Louvain-la-Neuve since 1972. From 2018, the faculty is also establishing on the UCLouvain Charleroi campus, starting with a bachelor's degree in computer science in September 2020.

=== Studies ===
All courses are organised on the Louvain-la-Neuve campus. The bachelor's degree in computer science is also taught in Charleroi. Only a minor amount of courses of the master's degree in cybersecurity are held at Louvain-la-Neuve, it being a joint degree between UCLouvain, the Royal Military Academy, the University of Namur, the Université libre de Bruxelles, the Bruxelles-Brabant College (HE2B) and the Haute École libre de Bruxelles - Ilya Prigogine, with courses in Louvain-la-Neuve, Namur and Brussels.

The faculty has also developed specific programs in collaboration with other universities. While students can choose to swap some courses with courses given in Leuven at sister university KU Leuven's Faculty of Engineering science; other partnerships include MIT and Yale University.

==== Undergraduate studies (3 years) ====
- Bachelor in engineering science, orientation civil engineer
- Bachelor in computer science

==== Graduate studies (2 years) ====
- Master : mechanical civil engineer
- Master : electrical civil engineer
- Master : electromechanical civil engineer
- Master : civil engineer physicist
- Master : biomedical civil engineer
- Master : civil construction engineer
- Master : civil engineer in computer science
- Master : civil engineer in chemistry and materials science
- Master : civil engineer in applied mathematics
- Master in computer science (120 ECTS)
- Master in computer science (60 ECTS)
- Master in cybersecurity
- Master in data science, orientation information technology

===== Erasmus Mundus programs =====
- European Master of research on information and communication technologies (MERIT)
- European Master in functionalised advanced materials and engineering (FAME)
- European Master in engineering rheology (EURHEO)

==== Specialized masters (1 year) ====
- Specialized Master's degree in nuclear engineering
- Specialized Master's degree in nanotechnology

==== Doctoral studies ====
- Doctorate in engineering sciences
- Doctorate in construction engineering and urban planning

=== Structure ===
Within the Louvain School of Engineering, ten different so-called Commissions de programme organise and supervise the teaching curricula: one commission for the bachelor's degrees (BTCI), and one commission for each graduate field of studies. In addition to these commissions which can be considered as graduate school departments, the School of urbanism and territorial planning (URBA) coordinates teaching and research in urban planning.

Four research institutes are attached to the Louvain School of Engineering: the Institute of Information and Communication Technologies, Electronics and Applied Mathematics (ICTEAM), the Institute of Condensed Matter and Nanosciences (IMCN), the Institute of Mechanics, Materials and Civil Engineering (IMMC) and Louvain Institute of Data Analysis and Modeling in economics and statistics (LIDAM).

Post-doctoral research is mainly done through independent research institutes within UCLouvain's Sciences and Technology Sector (SST). In engineering, these notably include the Louvain Institute of Biomolecular Science and Technology, the Institute of Information and Communication Technologies (IBST), Electronics and Applied Mathematics (ICTM), the Institute of Condensed Matter and Nanosciences (IMCN), the Institute of Mechanics, Materials and Civil Engineering (IMMC), the Institut de recherche en mathématique et physique including the Cyclotron Research Center and particle accelerator, the Biological imaging technology platform, the inter-institute Serres-Phytotron technological platform the Institute of Intensive Computing and Mass Storage or the Earth and Life Institute. These further include numerous research centers and individual laboratories primarily in Louvain-la-Neuve, the Louvain-la-Neuve Science Park, in Charleroi (Aéropole Science Park) and other sciences parks of Wallonia.

The Louvain School of Engineering is part of the Conférence des Grandes écoles.

== History ==
=== Leuven ===
Inspired by the École centrale des arts et manufactures in Paris, the École des Arts et Manufactures and the École des Mines were founded in 1864 within the Faculty of Science of the (still unitary) Catholic University of Louvain in Louvain (Leuven). The studies lasted four years and allowed recruitment from private companies. Courses were given at the Marie-Thérèse College and the Pope's College.

In 1867, the Schools were renamed into the Special Schools of Arts and Manufacturing, Civil Engineering and Mines (Écoles spéciales des Arts et Manufactures, du Génie Civil et des Mines) to which was later added d'Architecture et d'Électricité, which led to the long lasting name of Écoles spéciales.

The Union of Engineers from the Louvain Special Schools (Union des Ingénieurs sortis des Écoles Spéciales de Louvain), now called AILouvain (Alumni Ingénieurs de Louvain) was founded in Charleroi in 1872, as was the Cercle industriel.

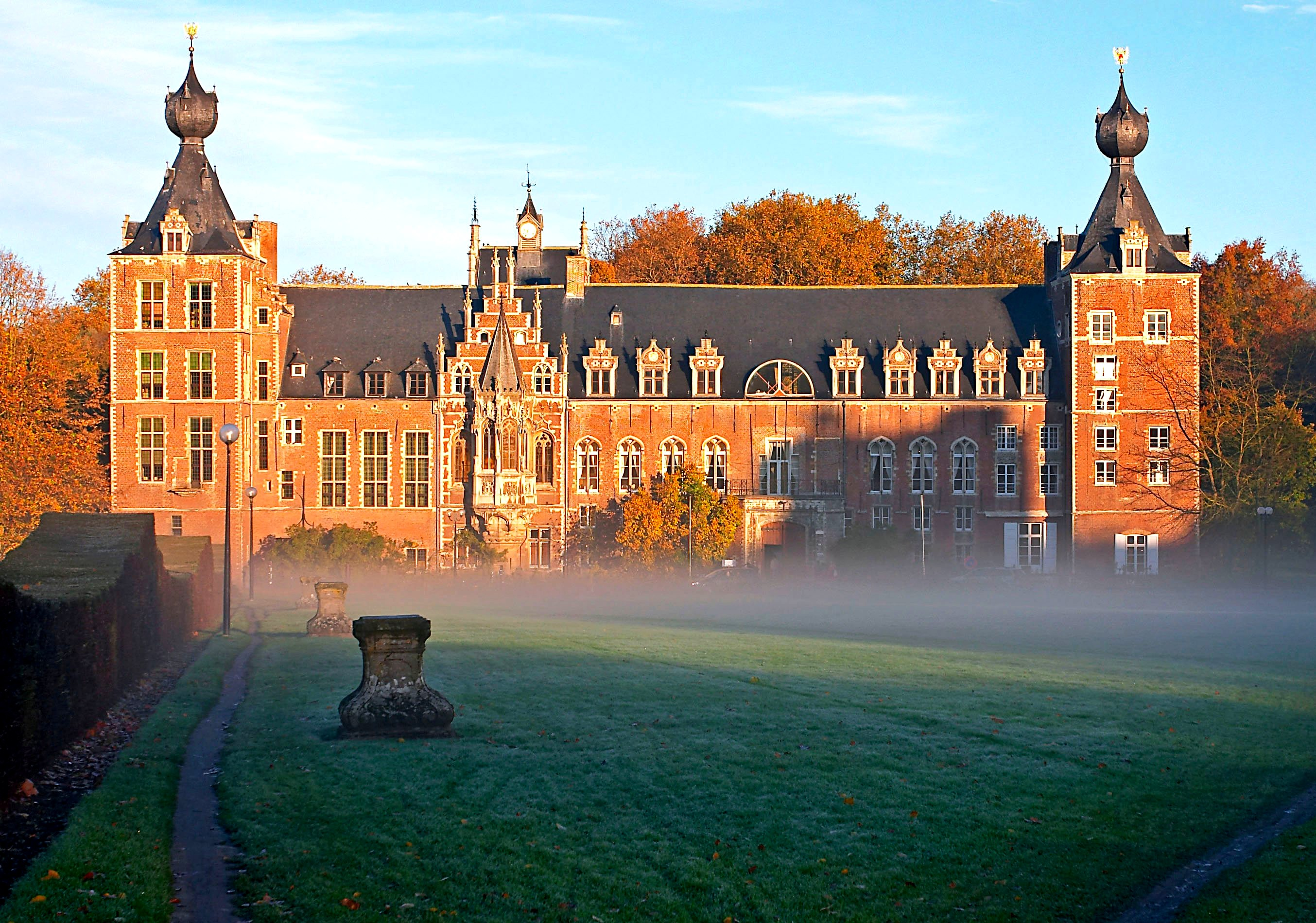
The Arenberg Castle, hosting the Catholic University of Louvain's Faculty of Applied Science.

Until 1889, the diplomas awarded by the Écoles spéciales were considered as "scientific" diplomas because only the State Universities, which were Liège and Ghent, were authorised to award "legal" diplomas, which were necessary for civil service and public works engineers. The abolition of the monopoly of state universities enabled the University of Louvain to organise 5-year courses in mining and civil engineering from 1890 onwards. In addition, a training as engineer-geologist leading to a university degree was created. The Institute for Electromechanics (Institut d'Électromécanique) was inaugurated in 1901, in new buildings in the center of Leuven, the first proper buildings built for the Special Schools. Further institutes were created in the Arenberg Castle park in 1925, and the Écoles spéciales moved into the castle in 1931, in Heverlee.

The first courses in Dutch were given in 1914. A 1929 law greatly broadened the offer of "legal" diplomas and 9 new engineering courses were created in Louvain and Courtrai (textile industry). The courses of physical engineering and shipbuilding engineering began in 1945 and were the only ones not to be duplicated when the university was split: they were transferred entirely to Louvain-la-Neuve.

Programs in management and labour sciences were created in the 1950s.

The School of Urban and Regional Planning (URBA), whose structure within the faculty has remained intact since then, was founded in 1961.

In the same year, the Écoles spéciales became the Faculty of Applied Sciences (Faculté des sciences appliquées, FSA), as an entity which for the first time was independent from the Faculty of Science, and the Business Engineering and Applied Mathematics Engineering programs were created. Training in management and labour sciences was transferred to the Faculty of Economic and Social Sciences, founded simultaneously.

The Faculty was linguistically separated in 1964 into the Dutch-speaking Faculteit ingenieurswetenschappen and the francophone Faculté des sciences appliquées.

=== The split ===
At the beginning of the 1960s, the practical split of the Catholic University of Leuven became inevitable and serious consideration was already being given to transferring the French-speaking part outside Louvain. Following the Leuven crisis, the transfer was formally decided at the end of 1968: the Faculties of Medicine, Dentistry and Pharmaceutical science was to be located in Woluwe, Brussels (UCLouvain Brussels Woluwe) and the other faculties in Louvain-la-Neuve (between the French-speaking municipalities of Ottignies and Wavre); while the (Flemish) KUL would remain in Leuven.

In 1971, the French-speaking programmes of the Faculty of Applied Sciences were offered on the Heverlee campus, on the outskirts of the city of Louvain (Leuven). From 1973, the programs for the last three years of civil engineering were given at the new Louvain-la-Neuve site, while the candidature degrees (undergraduate) were still being taught at Heverlee. In 1975, the entire Faculty of Applied Sciences (FSA) of the UCL was established in Louvain-la-Neuve. The students from the faculty were the first students (and residents) of the city of Louvain-la-Neuve.

At that time the "city" was only made up of a few academic buildings. The construction site was huge and the city very sparsely populated.

==== The transfer of the sacred pavement ====
"The 1972-73 academic year began on October 2. For the first time, students met in Louvain-la-Neuve: the engineers.

They inaugurated the Sainte-Barbe auditoriums, walked in boots among the construction sites, walked in all directions through the tiny district of the Kots du Biéreau and the embryo of the rue des Wallons. A little lonely, but full of energy and imagination.

An idea emerged: take a pavement from the Place du Vieux-Marché in Leuven (the one bordering the bottom of the Halles) and, in turns, run through the forest and countryside, and transplant it to the only public space existing in Louvain-la-Neuve: Place Sainte-Barbe!

This was done on October 12. The first kilometre was solemn in appearance, with the pavement placed on a processional stretcher. The real start took place at Arenberg Castle (Heverlee), whose park had been home to the Faculty of Applied Sciences for decades.

- UCLouvain Archives, Service des Archives de l'Université catholique de Louvain, rue Montesquieu 27, 1348 Louvain-la-Neuve

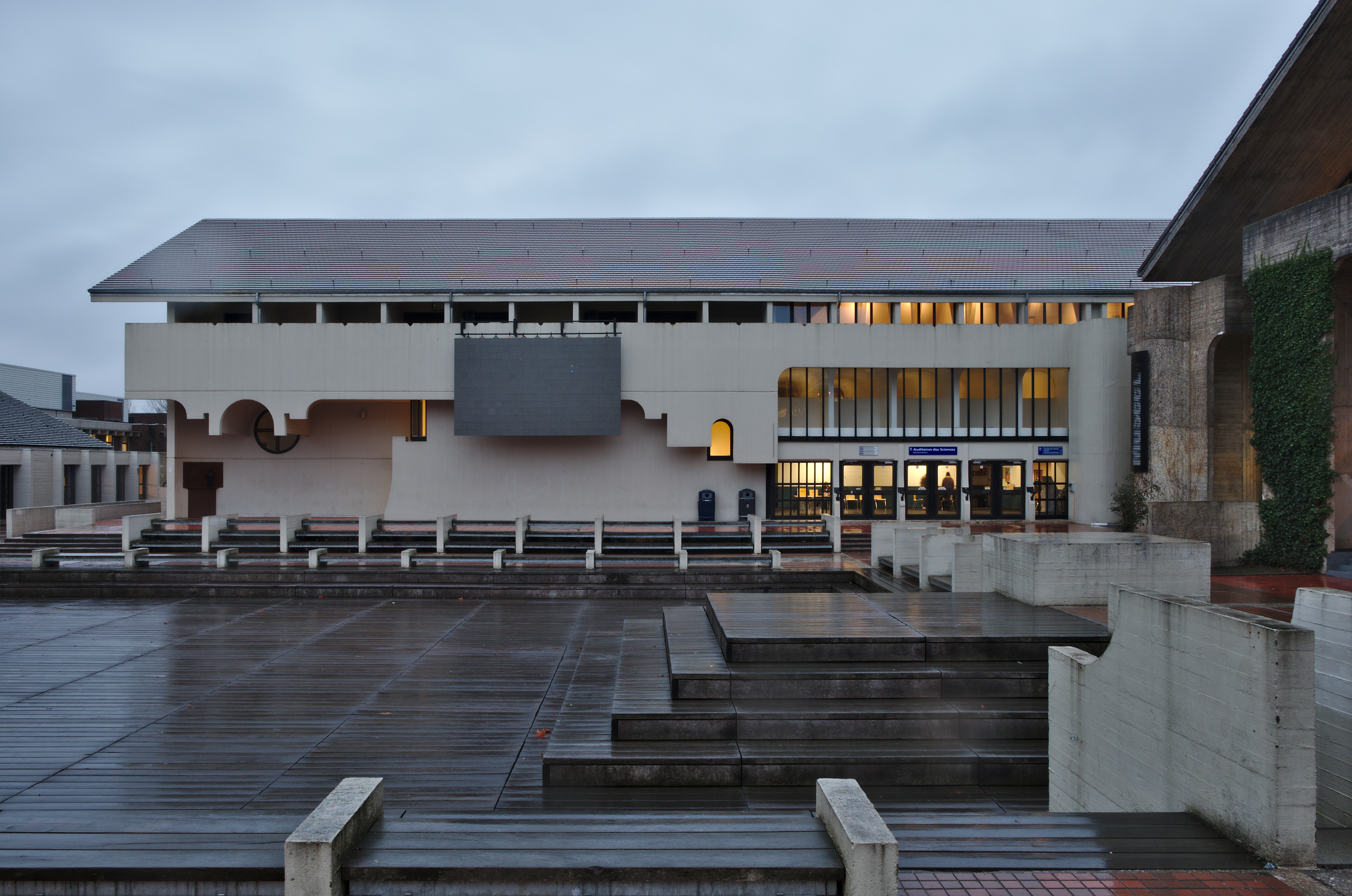
Auditoires des Sciences in Louvain-la-Neuve, hosting part of the Louvain School of Engineering.

Since 1986, students from Louvain-la-Neuve and the Dutch-speaking faculty of the Katholieke Universiteit te Leuven, based in Louvain, have been allowed to take certain optional courses at the sister university.

In 1990, the Faculty of Applied Sciences co-founded CESAER, the Conference of European Schools for Advanced Engineering Education and Research, in Louvain, with six members originally considered the main institutes for the development of engineering sciences in Europe: the two universities of Louvain, the École des Mines in Paris, Imperial College London, RWTH Aachen University and TU Delft.

=== The École polytechnique de Louvain ===
In 2008, the Faculty of Applied Sciences officially changed its name to École polytechnique de Louvain (EPL). It uses the English translation Louvain School of Engineering in its international and external communication. It also incorporated UCLouvain's department of computer science.

The Faculty's logo between 2008 and 2018.

Logo since 2018.

==== Multi-site faculty ====
From 2020, the Louvain School of Engineering will organise a bachelor's degree in computer science at UCLouvain Charleroi. It thus becomes the first faculty in the University's Science and Technology Sector to become so-called "multi-site" and to be established on two different campuses. It is also the sector's first degree offered in Charleroi.

== Notably faculty or alumni ==
- Canon Georges Lemaître (1894-1966), author of the Hubble–Lemaître law and the Big Bang theory, teacher at the faculty until his emeritus in 1964.
- Charles-Jean de La Vallée Poussin (1886-1962), civil engineer of mines (1890), renowned mathematician.
- Charles Manneback (1894-1975).
- Vitold Belevitch (1921-1999), civil engineer, author (among others) of mathematical theorems on electrical circuits, professor at the Louvain School of Engineering.
- Prof. Baron Marcel Crochet (1938), civil engineer (fluid mechanics), Rector of UCLouvain from 1995 to 2004.
- Alain Hubert, polar explorer
- Jean-Jacques Quisquater, cryptographer and faculty professor.
- Jean-Pierre Hansen, civil electrician engineer, currently president of SNCB-Logistics (2012–present), former managing director of Electrabel (1992-1999 and 2005-2010) and Associate Professor of Economics at the EPL.
- Stefan Vanoverbeke, CEO of IKEA France.
- Vincent Blondel, author of the Louvain method and current rector of UCLouvain

== See also ==
- Université catholique de Louvain
- Louvain-la-Neuve
- UCLouvain Charleroi
