= Theme-based shared flat (kot-à-projet) =

Belgian student accommodation and project team

Kot-à-projet

Characteristics
- Type: Student Organization
- Location: Belgium
- Number of Kap's: About 130
- Capacity (each): 6 to 12 persons
- Created: 1972
- Founder: UCLouvain
- Website: www.organe.be/les-kots-a-projets/
- Kap's first started in Louvain-la-Neuve (there are almost 80 kap's now), also developed in Brussels, Namur, Mons and Liège

A theme-based shared flat (called kot-à-projet or KàP in French) is a concept created by the University of Louvain (UCLouvain) which consists of between six and twelve students sharing a "kot" (student accommodation) and working together on a project. The project lasts for one academic year and can embrace cultural, social or humanitarian activities. There is a total of about 130 KàPs in Belgium gathering more than 1000 students. Some KàPs have a room reserved for exchange students only.

== History ==
Theme-based shared flats were already used in 1972 in Louvain-la-Neuve in Belgium. Louvain-la-Neuve, a university town, was built after unrest among Flemish and Dutch speaking students in the original Catholic University of Louvain in Leuven, present-day Flanders. During its creation, the city included the concept of kot-à-projet. In the beginning, these theme-based shared flats were recognized as "student organizations" and were inspired by the (mostly Christian) community houses which existed before the Dutch–French separation. Although mixed-sex accommodations remained officially banned, the university was allowed the theme-based shared flat's occupants to choose their flatmates. For this reason, the theme-based shared flats were the first mixed accommodation in Louvain-la-Neuve.

== Organization ==
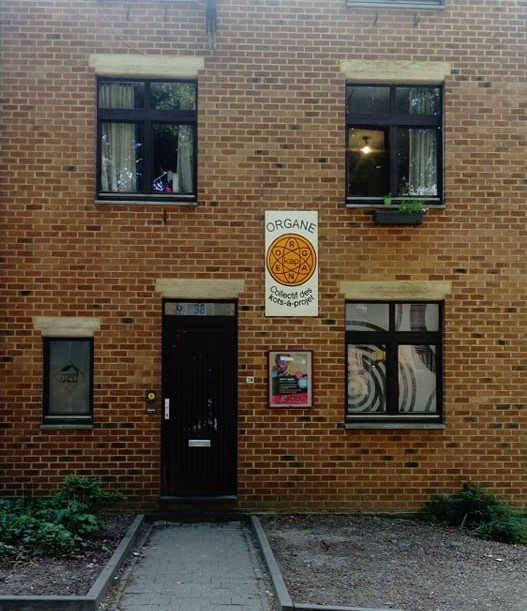
Classic Facade of the ORGANE, KAP collective for UCLouvain

Most KàPs are not legal associations, but they may organize a non-profit organization. The internal organization is adapted to student lifestyle. Depending on their academic careers, students will generally stay in the same theme-based flat for at most two or three years. Each year, this high turnover has to be compensated for by finding new people interested in taking the lead of the KàP. For this, existing members organize dinners to meet newcomers. Furthermore, to stay alive and continue to prove their utility, KàPs must defend their continued working each year to a commission. This commission is composed of UCLouvain officials and students, it examines the whole year covered by the KàPs, reads the file summary and plans for next year and then decides whether to give the KàPs an additional year on the campus.

== Committee ==
All the KàPs are organized around a committee called "the organ". This committee has three main positions: the chair, who is responsible for the KàPs official representations and governs the commission in charge of listening to KàPs defense about their renewal; the treasurer, who receives subsidies from the university and from the municipality and is responsible for redistributing them to the different KàPs; and the external relations manager, who is responsible for coordinating contacts between the KàPs, the University and the City

== Categorization of the projects ==
The different proposed projects of the KàPs are numerous but they can be categorized:

Type	Description
Awareness projects	These projects defend humanitarian and ecological causes and fight against discrimination
Student service projects	These projects provide for example the centralization of the purchasing of syllabus, the communication of information on the campus.
Cultural projects	These projects propose some excursion ( theater, museums, to discover film or comics,...), events,...
Catholic projects	Projects organizing parochial activities
Language projects	These project invite students to practice a foreign language outside the university context ( discussion table in a pub,...)

== Specificities of each city ==
Theme-bases shared flat started in Louvain-la-Neuve but this concept has been expanded to Brussels, Liège, Namur and Mons. In total there are about 130 KàPs in Belgium.

=== Louvain-la-Neuve ===
KàPs were invented in Louvain-la-Neuve and are hosted by the University of Louvain. The city holds 79 KàPs, with more than 800 residents.

==== Brussels ====
The medical campus of the University of Louvain, UCLouvain Brussels Woluwe, in the Brussels commune of Woluwe-Saint-Lambert, was also founded in the 1970s and started the implementation of KàPs in the Brussels region. UCLouvain holds over 15 KàPs in Brussels.

Saint-Louis University, Brussels also organises kots-à-projet in its three residences in the city of Brussels and on the campus of the Université libre de Bruxelles.

=== Namur ===
As a partner to UCLouvain, the University of Namur has developed 17 KàPs in its city of Namur.

=== Mons ===
KàPs started to develop in Mons in 2011, when the Catholic University of Mons (FUCaM) merged with the University of Louvain, creating the UCLouvain FUCaM Mons with four KàPs, known as 'Kots associatifs', in 2019, and nine in 2022.

=== Liège ===
The city of Liège is still developing the concept, where the University of Liège's student union started developing 4 KàPs, including FRISKOT which tackles food waste.
