= Osel =

Osel or Ösel may refer to:

== People ==
- Tenzin Ösel Hita (born 1985), Spanish Tibetan Buddhist tulku
- Ösel Tendzin (1943–1990), American Tibetan Buddhist lama

== Other uses ==
- Ösel (yoga)
- Orchestre Symphonique des Étudiants de Louvain-la-Neuve, a Belgian symphony orchestra
- Saaremaa, an island of Estonia, known as Ösel in German and Swedish
- Kreis Ösel, a subdivision of the Governorate of Livonia of the Russian Empire
