= UCLouvain Faculty of Economic, Social and Political Sciences and Communication =

Faculty of Economic, Social and Political Sciences and Communication
- Faculté des sciences économiques, sociales, politiques et de communication
- Other names: ESPO
- Former names: École des sciences politiques et sociales (1892); Faculté des sciences économiques et sociales (1950); Faculté des sciences économiques, sociales et politiques (1967)
- Type: Public university faculty
- Established: 1892 (134 years ago)
- Parent institution: UCLouvain
- Rector: Vincent Blondel
- Students: 6000
- Postgraduates: 1600
- Doctoral students: 250
- Other students: 400 (further education)
- Location: Louvain-la-Neuve, Mons, Charleroi, Belgium; 50.667791°N 4.611711°E
- Colours: Louvain blue & ESPO green
- Website: uclouvain.be/espo

The Faculty of Economic, Social and Political Sciences and Communication (ESPO) is a faculty of the University of Louvain, located on the campuses of Louvain-la-Neuve, FUCaM Mons and UCLouvain Charleroi. It originates in the School of Political and Social Sciences founded by Jules Van den Heuvel in Louvain in 1892. With over 6000 students, it is UCLouvain's largest faculty.

== History ==
In 1892 and 1897, two schools were founded within the Faculty of Law of the Catholic University of Louvain: the School of Political and Social Sciences and the School of Commercial and Consular Sciences. These new schools attempt to meet the challenges of industrial, political and scientific revolutions and train those who will engage in the conduct of the economy and social life. It was for these same reasons that the École supérieure commerciale et consulaire was founded in 1896 in La Louvière. This independent institution moved to Mons in 1899, obtained university status and eventually merged with UCLouvain in 2011.

Closely associated with each other, the two schools of UCLouvain will not stop reinventing and reorganizing themselves over time to keep pace with the changes in society and the development of the human and social sciences. They will be reorganized into different institutes, schools, faculties, departments (among others), focused on both practical teaching and advanced research. The latter was notably materialized by the creation of the Institute of Economics, the future Institute of Economic and Social Research (IRES), in 1928.

In 1908, the year of the transfer of Congo to the Belgian state, the School of Commercial and Consular Sciences started a degree in colonial sciences. After the First World War, it took on different names, including the École supérieure de commerce. In 1934, it was approved as a Higher Institute of Commerce (École supérieure de commerce) by royal decree. In 1941, Rector Van Waeyenbergh entrusted Jacques Leclercq with its reorganization. The School of Economics is founded, with four institutes: in addition to IRES, we find the Institute of Economics, the Institute of Applied Economics (ISEA), and the Institute of Actuarial Sciences.

In 1950, the School of Political and Social Sciences and the School of Economics split from the Faculty of Law to become a fully-fledged faculty: the Faculty of Economic and Social Sciences. It becomes one of the largest faculties in terms of student numbers. In 1961, the Institute for Development Studies was created.

In 1967, the faculty changed its name to the Faculty of Economic, Social and Political Sciences. In 1975, when moving from Leuven to Louvain-la-Neuve, the faculty was reorganized into 9 departments. The ISEA became the Institute of Administration and Management (IAG), while communication, demography, European studies and labour sciences appear as departments. The faculty is further reorganized several times during the 1980s and 1990s, with notably the creation of a department of sociology.

Within the framework of the Bologna Process, the French Community decree of 31 March 2004 leads to the creation of bachelor's degrees for the first cycle of higher education in 2004, and master's degrees for the second cycle in 2007.

In 2008, the IAG becomes autonomous under the name of Louvain School of Management, which two years later become a fully separate faculty.

In 2010, on the occasion of the internal reform of the UCLouvain, which separates teaching and research activities, the faculty became the Faculty of Economic, Social and Political Sciences and Communication. The faculty's researchers integrate different research institutes.

=== Hainaut ===
In 2011, following the merger between the Facultés universitaires catholiques de Mons (FUCaM) and UCLouvain, the ESPO faculty became a 'multi-site', established in Louvain-la-Neuve, Mons and Charleroi.

=== Brussels ===
Though strongly related, the Faculty of Economic, Social, Political and Communication Sciences (also abbreviated ESPO) of UCLouvain Saint-Louis Brussels, is a distinct and autonomous faculty founded in 1965, located on Saint-Louis University's main campus, in the center of Brussels.

== Description ==
=== Organisation ===
The faculty hosts six schools, in addition to a structure of management for undergraduate programmes (SESP), and the FOPES open faculty:

- Economics School of Louvain (ESL)
- School of Communication (COMU)
  - Louvain School of Journalism (EjL)
- Louvain School of Political and Social Sciences (PSAD)
- School of Occupational Sciences (TRAV)
- Interfaculty School of European Studies (IEE)
- School of Aggregation (AGES)
- Open Faculty of Economic and Social Policy (FOPES)

==== Louvain School of Journalism ====
The UCLouvain School of Communication (COMU) organises the different degrees in information and communication studies, including two different master's degrees in journalism; the first one ('advanced studies') being focused on research, and the second one being the Louvain School of Journalism (École de journalisme de Louvain, abbreviated EjL) degree, which is part academic and part practical. The Louvain School of Journalism also includes classes at the IAD film school in Louvain-la-Neuve (Institut des arts de diffusion). In addition to this, the Louvain School of Journalism offers a double master's degree in Press and Information and another double master's degree in Media Literacy with the IHECS Brussels School of Journalism in Brussels.

The Louvain School of Journalism is associated with Media and Journalism Research Observatory (ORM), a research group within the UCLouvain School of Communication, and collaborates intensively with the Research Centre on Mediation (University of Lorraine) and the Academy of Journalism and Media (University of Neuchâtel). The Louvain School of Journalism is the founding member of the arppej network, the International Research Alliance for Journalism Education and Practice.

=== Main awarded degrees ===
All are organised in Louvain-la-Neuve, except stated otherwise.

==== First cycle ====
- Bachelor in Economics and Management
- Bachelor in Philosophy, Politics and Economics
- Bachelor in Human and Social Sciences (Louvain-la-Neuve and UCLouvain FUCaM Mons)
- Bachelor in Information and Communication (Louvain-la-Neuve and FUCaM Mons)
- Bachelor in Political Sciences (Louvain-la-Neuve and FUCaM Mons)
- Bachelor in Sociology and Anthropology
- Bachelor : Business Engineering (exclusively in Louvain-la-Neuve; the bachelor's degree in management engineering from UCLouvain FUCaM Mons is organised by the Louvain School of Management)

==== Second cycle ====
- Master in Anthropology
- Master in Communication (Louvain-la-Neuve and FUCaM Mons)
- Master in Economic and Social Policy (Louvain-la-Neuve and UCLouvain Charleroi)
- Master in Economics
- Master in Economics and Econometrics
- Master in European Studies (Louvain-la-Neuve and Saint-Louis Brussels)
- Master in Human Resources Management
- Master in Information and Communication Science and Technology
- Master in Journalism
- Master in Journalism (Louvain School of Journalism)
- Master in Labour sciences
- Master in Political Sciences (Louvain-la-Neuve and FUCaM Mons)
- Master in Political Sciences: International Relations (Louvain-la-Neuve and FUCaM Mons)
- Master in Population and Development Studies
- Master in press and specialised information (IHECS Brussels)
- Master in Public Administration (Louvain-la-Neuve and FUCaM Mons)
- Master in Social transitions and innovations (FUCaM Mons)
- Master in Sociology
- Master in specialised applied communication: media education (IHECS Brussels)
- Specialized master in international and development economics
- Specialized master in social economy
- Specialised master in development, environment and societies
- Specialised master in interdisciplinary analysis of European construction (Saint-Louis University, Brussels)
- Specialised master in international humanitarian aid
- Specialised master in quantitative methods in the social sciences
- Specialised master in risk and disaster management (FUCaM Mons)

The faculty offers master's degrees in evening classes within the Open Faculty of Economic and Social Policy (FOPES), in Louvain-la-Neuve and on the UCLouvain Charleroi campus.

The faculty also offers 21 university certificates.

=== Rankings and reputation ===
UCLouvain is ranked as best university in the world for its programmes in actuarial science. In 2016, as part of the Eduniversal Worldwide Best Master Ranking, the Master of Economics was ranking 15th in Europe and the Master of Public Administration 13th. In the QS World University Rankings by subject, the faculty is in the world's best 100 for statistics, economics and econometrics, and 94th in the world in the social sciences.

== See also ==
- Université catholique de Louvain
- Louvain School of Management
