= UCLouvain FUCaM Mons =

Branch of UCLouvain in Mons, Belgium

Coordinates: 50°27′10″N 3°58′59″E

- Sedes Sapientiae
- Former names: Facultés universitaires catholiques de Mons
- Motto: Sedes Sapientiae (Latin)
- Motto in English: Seat of Wisdom, Seat of Knowledge
- Type: Free university (state funded)
- Established: 1896 (130 years ago)
- Parent institution: Université catholique de Louvain
- Affiliations: The Guild; CEMS; CESAER; CLUSTER; Coimbra Group; IMCC; TIME
- Rector: Françoise Smets
- Academic staff: 238
- Students: 1,573 (2021)
- Location: Mons, Hainaut, Belgium
- Colors: Blue and white
- Nickname: Wolves
- Mascot: Woulfy
- Website: https://uclouvain.be/mons

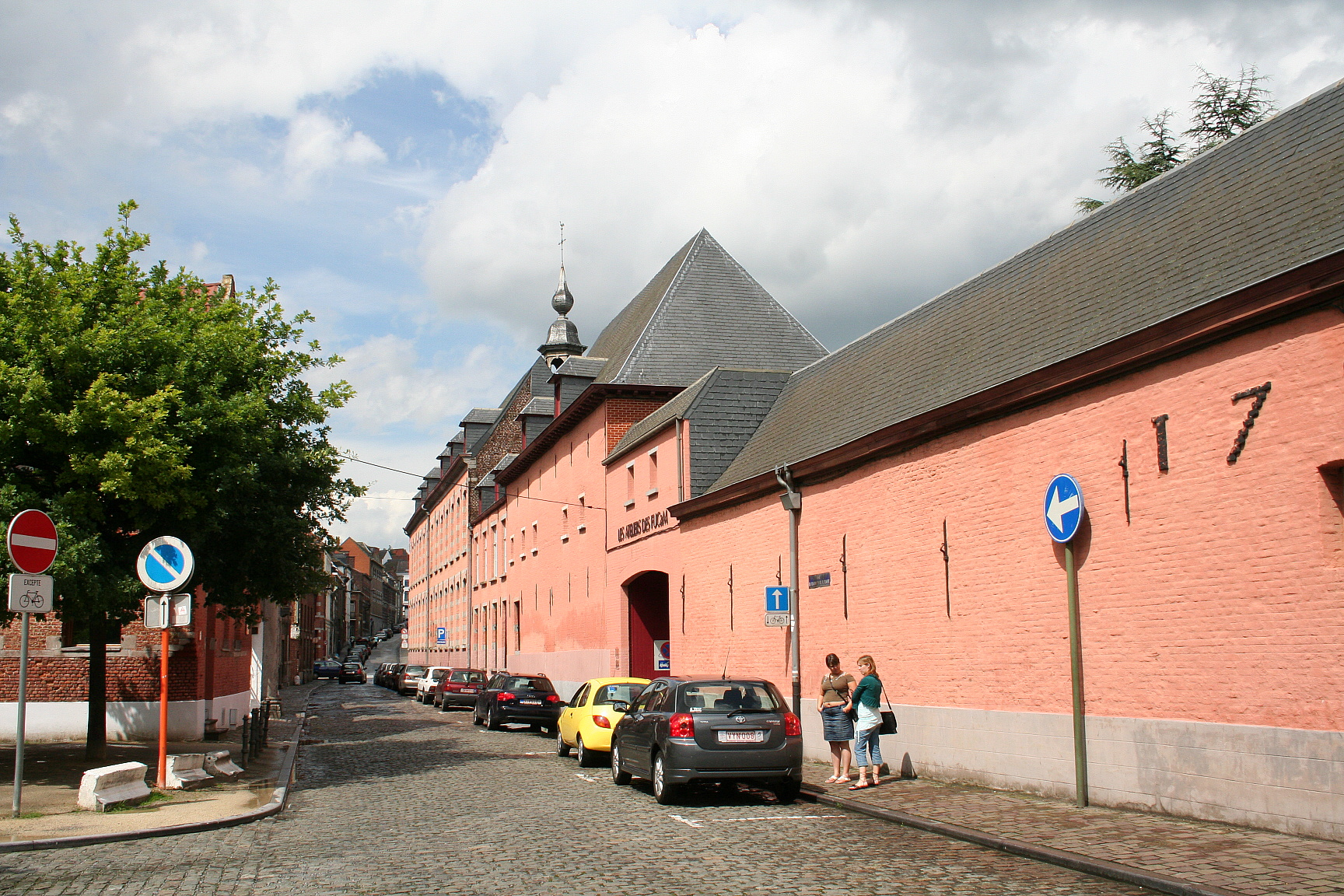
Ateliers of the FUCaM

UCLouvain FUCaM Mons is a satellite campus of the University of Louvain (UCLouvain) in Mons, Wallonia, Belgium founded in 1896. Until 2011, it was an independent institution known as the Catholic university of Mons (French name: Facultés universitaires catholique de Mons, abbreviation: FUCaM). Its official language is French.

UCLouvain FUCaM Mons is one of the two universities in the city Mons, the other being the University of Mons, and the main implementation of the UCLouvain in the province of Hainaut, along with UCLouvain Charleroi and UCLouvain Tournai. Before the merger of 2011, the FUCaM were one of the 9 Belgian French-speaking universities^{,}.

== Academic programs ==
The UCLouvain FUCaM Mons hosts two faculties of the University of Louvain:

- The Louvain School of Management with bachelor's and master's degrees in management and economics.
- The Faculty of Economic, Social, Political and Communication Sciences with degrees in political sciences, public administration, sociology, anthropology, and information-communication.

== Accreditations ==
UCLouvain is accredited by the "direction générale de l'Enseignement non obligatoire et de la recherche scientifique". The diplomas issued at UCLouvain FUCaM Mons are diplomas of the University of Louvain (UCLouvain), issued ed by the French-speaking Community of Belgium.

== Affiliations & partnerships ==
Until 2011, the FUCaM were part of the Académie Louvain network of French-speaking catholic universities of Belgium, with the intention to merge into a single institution.

As part of UCLouvain since 2011, the university is part of The Guild, CEMS, CESAER, CLUSTER, Coimbra Group, IMCC and TIME.

== See also ==
- Initialis Science Park
- Science and technology in Wallonia

== Sources ==
- Catholic University of Mons (in English)
