= Montignies-sur-Sambre =

Montignies-sur-Sambre Montgneye-so-Sambe (Walloon)
- Former municipality of Belgium
- Coat of arms

- Location in the municipality of Charleroi

- Location in Belgium
- Coordinates: 50°23′N 4°28′E
- Country: Belgium
- Region: Wallonia
- Community: French Community
- Province: Hainaut
- Municipality: Charleroi

Area
  - Total: 2.31 sq mi (5.98 km^{2})

Population (2001)
  - Total: 17,771
- Time zone: UTC+1 (CET)
  - Summer (DST): UTC+2 (CEST)
- Postal code: 6061
- Area code: 071

Montignies-sur-Sambre (French pronunciation: [mɔ̃tiɲi syʁ sɑ̃bʁ], lit. 'Montignies on Sambre'; Walloon: Montgneye-so-Sambe) is a town of Wallonia and a district of the municipality of Charleroi, located in the province of Hainaut, Belgium.

It was a municipality of its own before the fusion of the Belgian municipalities in 1977.

== Education ==
Montignies hosts the UCLouvain Charleroi campus of the University of Louvain.

== Notable persons ==
- Paul Finet (1897-1965), politician
- Joëlle Milquet (born 1961), politician
