= Aéropole Science Park =

Coordinates: 50°28′19.42″N 4°28′17.18″E

The Aéropole Science Park is a business incubator and science park located in Gosselies, Charleroi, Belgium, near the Brussels South Charleroi Airport.

It hosts 150 companies, providing around 3,600 jobs. Business and academic clusters are growing up in the following fields : aeronautics, ICT, biotechnologies, industrial engineering, training and R&D centres.

The science park hosts several research institutes including the Centre of Excellence in Information Technology (CETIC), a joint a centre of expertise for the development of Walloon companies founded by the universities of Louvain-la-Neuve (UCLouvain), Namur and Mons; the Cenaero (Research Centre in Aeronautics), an institute for the development of aeronautics and space industry of UCLouvain, the University of Liège and the Université libre de Bruxelles, and the ULB Institute for Molecular Biology & Medicine and the Institute for Medical Immunology, in collaboration with GlaxoSmithKline Biologicals.

The cluster hosts three spin-offs from UCLouvain: Cedit, a technology company, and since 2011, iTeos, a pharmaceutical company founded within the de Duve Institute at UCLouvain Brussels Woluwe and which raised a capital of 75 million US dollars in 2018, and Viridaxis, since 2011.

Several spin-offs of the Université libre de Bruxelles have their headquarters on the site: Henogen, DNA Vision, Bone Therapeutics, Euroscreen, Delphi Genetics, Aliwen, BV Transgenics Services, BioCygnus and ImmuneHealth.

== See also ==
- Science Parks of Wallonia
- UCLouvain Charleroi
