= Thierry Braspenning-Balzacq =

French scholar

Thierry Balzacq is a French scholar specializing in International Relations Theory, security, and diplomatic studies. He is a professor of Political Science at Sciences Po Paris. He was previously awarded Francqui Research Chair (the most prestigious University title awarded in Belgium), and held the Tocqueville Chair in IR at the University of Namur.

Balzacq has published over a hundred scientific works on theories of security, EU politics, and international relations. He is regarded as a leading scholar in security studies.

A former scientific director at the French Ministry of Defense (2014–2016), Thierry Balzacq led a group of experts reporting to the European Parliament and the European Commission on matters of security and border management (2005–2006).

Between 2012 and 2015, he was honorary professorial fellow at the University of Edinburgh.

In 2014, Canada awarded him a Tier 1 Research Chair in diplomacy and international security. These Chairs are awarded to researchers "recognized by their peers as world leaders in their field".

Thierry Balzacq studied philosophy and political science at Louvain, Cambridge and Harvard.
