= Rivara (surname) =

Rivara is a surname. Notable people with the surname include:

- Fred Rivara, American epidemiologist and public safety expert
- Javier Rivara, Argentine skier and Olympian
- María Cecilia Rivara, Chilean computer scientist

== See also ==
- Joaquim Heliodoro da Cunha Rivara (1809–1879), Portuguese physician and politician
