= Nimer Assy =

Israeli hepatologist and academic

- נימר אסי
- Born: September 10, 1961 (age 65); Fassouta, Upper Galilee
- Occupations: Hepatologist and academic

Academic background
- Education: MD
- Alma mater: University of Louvain (UCL), Belgium

Academic work
- Institutions: Bar-Ilan University

Nimer Assy (Hebrew: נימר עאסי) is an Israeli hepatologist and academic focusing on internal medicine and liver transplantation. He is a professor at the Bar-Ilan University Azrieli Medical School and the Department Head of the Clinical Research Unit within Internal Medicine Ward A of the Galilee Medical Center.

Assy's papers have been published in journals such as the Journal of Hepatology, Gut, Hepatology, the American Journal of Gastroenterology, and the New England Journal of Medicine. He is the recipient of several Outstanding Lecturer awards (2012–2021), the Matzpen Program Award (2020) from Azrieli Medical School, and the National Student Association Inspiring Lecturer Award (2021).

== Education ==
Assy earned an MD from the University of Louvain in 1987 and completed his residency in Internal Medicine at Rambam Medical Center, where he also assumed the role of Clinical Instructor in the Department of Internal Medicine in 1994. Subsequently, he pursued fellowships in Hepatology at the University of Manitoba in 1995 and in Liver Transplantation at the University of Western Ontario in 1996.

== Career ==
Assy continued working as a Clinical Instructor at the Technion Institute, later becoming an assistant professor in 2008. Concurrently, he held the position of Instructor at Ziv Medical Center from 1999 to 2007. He then moved to the Azrieli Medical School at Bar-Ilan University, where hes first an Associate Professor and promotoed to Professor in 2024.

== Research ==
Assy has contributed to the field of hepatology by researching cytokine expression in fatty liver diseases, revealing links between hepatic fatty liver disease, soft drinks, and coronary artery disease, while also focusing on viral hepatitis (B and C), nonalcoholic fatty liver disease (NAFLD) treatment, and leading studies on the impact of liver fat on coronary artery diseases. Together with colleagues, he examined the independent role of soft drink consumption in NAFLD patients, finding that higher soft drink intake is strongly associated with increased fatty liver infiltration, regardless of metabolic syndrome status. He also evaluated the relationship between NAFLD and coronary artery disease (CAD), showing that NAFLD patients, even without metabolic syndrome, have a higher risk of coronary atherosclerosis, which could be crucial for cardiovascular risk stratification.

Another facet of Assy's research centered on cirrhosis, as he assessed if insulin-like growth factor (IGF) I production post-growth hormone stimulation can serve as a marker for liver function and nutritional status in cirrhosis patients, finding potential insights into their condition. He further explored if propofol sedation during upper endoscopy in cirrhosis patients precipitates subclinical hepatic encephalopathy, concluding that propofol does not exacerbate the condition and provides shorter recovery and discharge times compared to midazolam sedation.

Focusing on liver regeneration, Assy analyzed PCNA mRNA and protein levels, PCNA immunostaining, and 3H-thymidine incorporation in rat liver regeneration after partial hepatectomy, affirming PCNA protein levels as a reliable marker for regenerative activity. In another study, he looked into exogenous Vascular Endothelial Growth Factor (VEGF) effects on rat liver regeneration post-partial hepatectomy, showing increased hepatocyte proliferation via elevated PCNA levels, suggesting VEGF's role in liver regeneration.

Assy, in collaborative work, also investigated whether adding vitamin D to standard antiviral therapy improves the hepatitis C virus (HCV) response, showcasing a significant enhancement in viral response rates among treatment-naïve patients with chronic HCV genotype 1 infection.

== Awards and honors ==
- 2021 – Inspiring Lecturer Award, National Student Association

== Selected articles ==
- Assy, N., Kaita, K., Mymin, D., Levy, C., Rosser, B., & Minuk, G. (2000). Fatty infiltration of liver in hyperlipidemic patients. Digestive diseases and sciences, 45, 1929–1934.
- Assy, N., Nasser, G., Kamayse, I., Nseir, W., Beniashvili, Z., Djibre, A., & Grosovski, M. (2008). Soft drink consumption linked with fatty liver in the absence of traditional risk factors. Canadian Journal of Gastroenterology and Hepatology, 22(10), 811–816.
- Abid, A., Taha, O., Nseir, W., Farah, R., Grosovski, M., & Assy, N. (2009). Soft drink consumption is associated with fatty liver disease independent of metabolic syndrome. Journal of Hepatology, 51(5), 918–924.
- Nseir, W., Nassar, F., & Assy, N. (2010). Soft drinks consumption and nonalcoholic fatty liver disease. World journal of gastroenterology: WJG, 16(21), 2579.
- Abu-Mouch, S., Fireman, Z., Jarchovsky, J., Zeina, A. R., & Assy, N. (2011). Vitamin D supplementation improves sustained virologic response in chronic hepatitis C (genotype 1)-naïve patients. World journal of gastroenterology: WJG, 17(47), 5184.
- Basheer, M., & Assy, N. (2024). THU-091 Predictors of acute-on-chronic liver failure (ACLF) and mortality in ambulatory cirrhotic patients. Journal of Hepatology, 80, S172.
