= CeReFiM =

Research center at the University of Namur, Belgium

Coordinates: 50.466661°N 4.857434°E

CeReFiM (Center for Research in Finance and Management) is a research center attached to the University of Namur in Belgium. Research at the CeReFiM focuses on finance and management practices. The current head of the CeReFiM is Pr. Pierre Giot.
