= Institut des hautes études des communications sociales =

The Institut des hautes études des communications sociales – École de journalisme de Bruxelles (IHECS) (French for: Institute of Higher Studies in Social Communication – Brussels School of Journalism) is a French-speaking Belgian college of communication based in Brussels.

The IHECS was founded in Tournai in 1958 within the Institut Saint-Luc. The school later used the classrooms of the Catholic University of Mons in Mons, from 1977 to 1990, when it moved to Brussels. It is structured as the "Social" branch of the Brussels' Haute École Galilée and is an autonomous college of the Christian pillar, subsidized by the French Community of Belgium.

The IHECS proposes Bachelor's and Master's in Journalism, Public Relations, Advertising, Socio-Cultural Animation & Education, Media Literacy and Event Management. The institution also offers specializations or Third-Cycle Education. IHECS proposes Postgraduate Degrees (Diplôme d'Enseignement Supérieur Spécialisé – DESS) in Economic and Financial Information, European Journalism, Communication and European Affairs, Communication and Development as well as Strategic and Commercial Communication. The articulation of theoretical and practical courses proposed by IHECS has enabled the institution to be considered one of the best communication schools in Belgium.
