= Andries Van den Abeele =

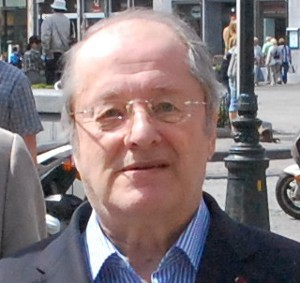
- In 2010

Municipal councilor of Bruges
- In office 1994–1996
- In office 1965–1982

Alderman of Bruges
- In office 1972–1977

Personal details
- Born: April 12, 1935 (age 91) Bruges, Belgium
- Party: Christian People's Party (till 1992), Flemish Liberals and Democrats (since 1992)

Andries Maurice Jean Marie Baron Van den Abeele (born April 12, 1935, in Bruges) is a Belgian historian historical preservationist, and former entrepreneur, politician, and employers' organization chairman.

Van den Abeele studied philosophy and the arts at the Université de Namur and the University of Leuven. He was the corporate director of Van den Abeele N.V. from 1960 to 1997. He is married and has three children.

== Politics ==
As a member of the Christian People's Party (Christelijke Volkspartij, abbr. CVP) he was a member of the municipal council of Bruges from 1965 to 1982. He was also an alderman of finance and urban renewal from 1972 to 1977.

In 1992, he switched to Flemish Liberals and Democrats (Vlaamse Liberalen en Democraten, abbr. VLD), and from 1994 to 1996 he was again a municipal councilor.

== Historical preservation and writings ==
In 1965, he erected with friends the Marcus Gerards Association in order to preserve and renovate the architectural conservation in the city of Bruges.

Van den Abeele wrote a lot about urban renewal, historical preservation, and the history of the city of Bruges. He also wrote about Freemasonry.
