= Orchestre Symphonique des Étudiants de Louvain-la-Neuve =

Symphony orchestra based in Wallonia, Belgium

Orchestre symphonique des Étudiants de Louvain-la-Neuve (OSEL) is a Belgian symphony orchestra based in Louvain-la-Neuve, Wallonie, and mainly composed of students from the University of Louvain (UCLouvain).

== History ==
The Orchestra was founded in 1980 as the Université catholique de Louvain Symphony Orchestra. It was later renamed OSEL, which stands for 'Orchestre symphonique des Étudiants de Louvain-la-Neuve' (Louvain-la-Neuve Student Symphony Orchestra).

From 1985 to 2002, OSEL was managed by members of the Orchestrakot (a student group) and some professors at UCLouvain. From 2002 onwards, the orchestra has been managed by the not-for-profit organisation OSEL, which organizes concerts, tours abroad and day-to-day operations. The not-for-profit is composed of musicians in the orchestra and a new board is elected every year.

== Organisation ==
OSEL counts between 60 and 80 musicians led by director Philippe Gérard since 2000. Most musicians are students or alumni from UCLouvain, but the orchestra is open to all musicians willing to participate to its musical project.

Concerts are held at least twice a year in the Aula Magna in Louvain-la-Neuve, with regular concerts in other Belgian cities.

OSEL is Cultural Ambassador of UCLouvain since 2003 and the orchestra takes part to international music festivals where it represents both UCLouvain and Belgium (festivals in Spain, Italy, France, etc.).

Rehearsals take place every week during the academic year and auditions are organized for new members in September and in February.
