= Académie Louvain =

Académie Louvain (French pronunciation: [akademi luvɛ̃]) was a network of French-speaking catholic universities in Belgium active between 2004 and 2015. It was formed following the Bologna process to reform higher-level education, creating a larger university structure.

== Universities in the network ==
The network included:

- Université catholique de Louvain (UCLouvain; Louvain-la-Neuve, Mons, Saint-Gilles, Woluwe-Saint-Lambert, Charleroi, Tournai)
- Facultés universitaires Saint-Louis (FUSL), today Université Saint-Louis - Bruxelles (Brussels)
- Facultés universitaires Notre-Dame de la Paix (FUNDP), today University of Namur (UNamur, Namur)
- Facultés universitaires catholiques de Mons (FUCaM), now part of the University of Louvain as UCLouvain FUCaM Mons (Mons and Charleroi)

== The merger process ==
The first implementation of the Académie Louvain network was the creation of the Louvain School of Management, which could unite the faculties and departments of economics, management and business of all four universities, in 5 different cities. This specific choice was made because all four member universities offered degrees in this field. It also included the ICHEC Brussels Management School, a college based in Brussels.

After almost three years of active collaboration within the network, the rectors of the four catholic universities decided on 12 March 2007 to open negotiations with the aim of merging the four establishments into one single university. Each site was to become a site of "UC Louvain".

The merger among the four was aborted on 17 December 2010 after the ultimate vote on the board of UNamur failed to attain the required 80% (30 in favour and 14 against).

FUCaM merges with the Université catholique de Louvain separately on 15 September 2011 becoming the UCL Mons.

In 2013, the merger process being cancelled, the FUNDP in Namur and FUSL in Brussels decide to change their names and respectively become the University of Namur and Saint-Louis University, Brussels.

In 2017, Saint-Louis University, Brussels and the Université catholique de Louvain (UCL, which has two campuses in Brussels) decide to merge and form a new university called UCLouvain. This last merger is yet to be formally endorsed by the French Community of Belgium that organizes all state funded education, but will de facto take effect in September 2018.

== Dissolution ==
The Académie Louvain was formally dissolved on 26 February 2016 as a consequence of the new legislation for the higher education in French-speaking Belgium, the Décret Paysage (also known as the Décret Marcourt). The merger plan partially succeeded as the original UCL, FUSL and FUCaM still merged in a single institution called UCLouvain. Practical collaborations of the Académie Louvain are still in place, as for example all 20 libraries work in a single network called BORéAL (Bibliothèque On-Line du Réseau de l'Académie Louvain).
