= UCLouvain =

Public university in Louvain-la-Neuve, Belgium

Coordinates: 50°40′10.6″N 04°36′44.15″E

- Université catholique de Louvain
- The Sedes Sapientiae, seal of UCLouvain.
- Latin: Universitas Catholica Lovaniensis
- Former name: Université catholique de Belgique
- Motto: Sedes Sapientiae (Latin)
- Motto in English: Seat of Wisdom, Seat of Knowledge
- Type: Private, subsidised by public authorities
- Established: 1425 as Studium Generale Lovaniense (predecessor institution); 1834 as Catholic University of Leuven (1834–1968); 1970 (split)
- Affiliations: Guild of European Research-Intensive Universities; CEMS; CESAER; CLUSTER; Coimbra Group; IMCC; EMPA; TIME
- Religious affiliation: Roman Catholicism
- Budget: €220 million (2017)
- Rector: Françoise Smets
- Administrative staff: 6,097 (2021)
- Students: 37,686 (2023-24)
- Doctoral students: 5,088
- Location: Belgium
- Campus: Louvain-la-Neuve, with campuses in Brussels (City of Brussels, Woluwe-Saint-Lambert & Saint-Gilles), Mons, Tournai, Charleroi, Namur, Dinant, Yvoir
- Colors: Blue and white
- Nickname: Wolves
- Mascot: Woulfy
- Website: www.uclouvain.be
- Data as of 2011

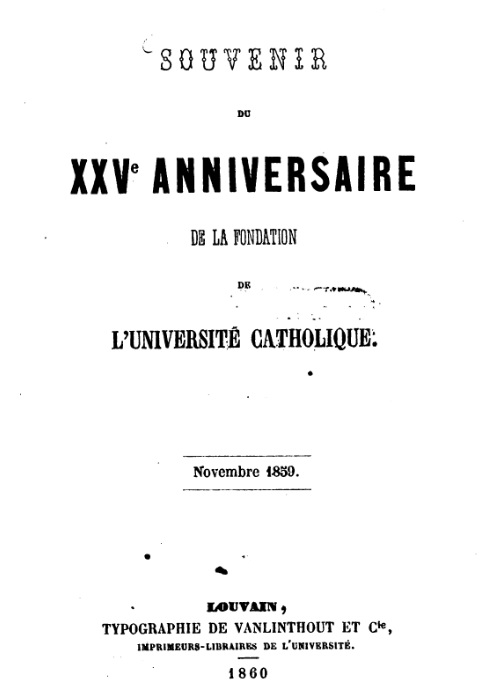
Book celebrating the 25 anniversary of the founding of the Catholic University of Louvain, November 3, 1859.

UCLouvain (or Université catholique de Louvain [ynivɛʁsite katɔlik də luvɛ̃], French for Catholic University of Louvain, officially in English the University of Louvain) is Belgium's largest French-speaking university and one of the oldest in Europe (originally established in 1425). It is located in Louvain-la-Neuve, which was expressly built to house the university, and has smaller campuses in Brussels, Charleroi, Mons, Tournai and Namur. Since September 2018, the university uses the branding UCLouvain, replacing the acronym UCL, following a merger with Saint-Louis University, Brussels.

The original University of Louvain (Universitas Lovaniensis) was founded at the centre of the historic town of Leuven (or Louvain) in 1425, making it the first university in Belgium and the Low Countries, and abolished by law in 1797. This university was the centre of Baianism, Jansenism and Febronianism in Europe. A new university, the State University of Louvain, was founded in 1817 and abolished by the law in 1835. A new catholic university was founded in Mechlin in 1834, the Catholic University of Mechlin and moved to Leuven in 1835 that is frequently, but controversially, identified as a continuation of the older institution.^{A}^{B} In 1968 the Catholic University of Leuven split into the Dutch-language Katholieke Universiteit Leuven, which stayed in Leuven, and the French-language Université catholique de Louvain, which moved to Louvain-la-Neuve in Wallonia, 30 km southeast of Brussels. Since the 15th century, Leuven/Louvain, as it is still often called, has been a major contributor to the development of Catholic theology.

== History ==
The Catholic University of Leuven, based in Leuven ("Louvain" in French), 30 km east of Brussels, provided lectures in French from its founding in 1834, and in Dutch from 1930. In 1968, the Dutch-language section became the independent Katholieke Universiteit Leuven, which remained in Leuven, while the French-speaking university was expelled to a greenfield campus and town, Louvain-la-Neuve, 30 km south-east of Brussels, in a part of the country where French is the official language. This separation also entailed dividing existing library holdings between the two new universities.

With the democratization of university education already stretching existing structures, plans to expand the French-speaking part of the university at a campus in Brussels or Wallonia were quietly discussed from the early 1960s, but it was not anticipated that the French-speaking section would become an entirely independent university and lose all of its buildings and infrastructure in Leuven. The first stone of the new campus at Louvain-la-Neuve was laid in 1971, and the transfer of faculties to the new site was completed in 1979.

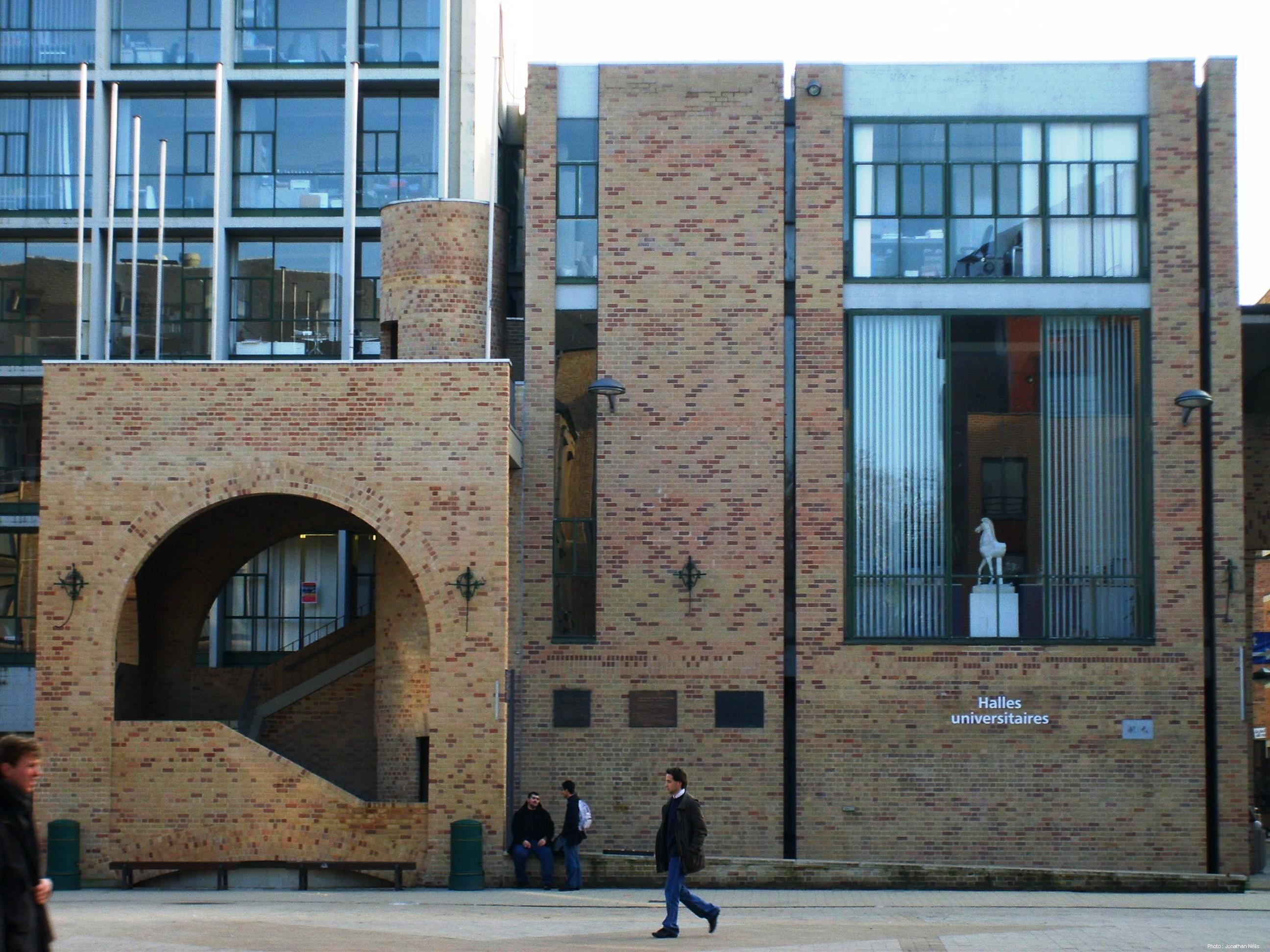
The Halles universitaires in Louvain-la-Neuve

According to a 2007 agreement, the University of Louvain was to absorb three smaller French-speaking catholic colleges: the Facultés universitaires Notre-Dame de la Paix (FUNDP) located in Namur, the Facultés universitaires Saint-Louis (FUSL) located in Brussels (later called Saint-Louis University, Brussels) and the Catholic university of Mons (FUCaM) located in Mons and Charleroi. The negotiations for a full merger aborted by an insufficient vote by the general assembly of the FUNDP in December 2010. The result was a merger between the University of Louvain and the FUCaM in Mons, effective from 15 September 2011. The Mons campus is denoted UCLouvain FUCaM Mons. The three universities still collaborate in consortium, the Académie Louvain. Within this group, member universities have coordinated their masters programmes in the fields of economics, management, political sciences and sciences as well as the doctoral programmes in all disciplines.

In September 2018, the University of Louvain (or UCL until then) and Saint-Louis University, Brussels de facto merged, founding the UCLouvain, a denomination they currently share.

== Chronology ==
In 1425, Dukes of Brabant created the University of Louvain (Université de Louvain), which was suppressed under Joseph II, reopened in 1790, and was finally closed under the French Republic in 1797.

In 1817, the State University of Louvain (Université de l'Etat de Louvain) was founded, which closed 15 August 1835.

In 1834, the Catholic bishops of Belgium created the Catholic University of Belgium (Université catholique de Belgique) in Mechlin, also known as the Catholic University of Malines (Université catholique de Malines).

A law passed on 27 September 1835 stated that there would be only one university funded by the State of Belgium in Louvain. The same year, shortly after the suppression of the State University, the Catholic University of Belgium moved to Louvain. It took advantage of the reputation of the city as an ancient university centre and adopted a new name: Catholic University of Louvain (Université catholique de Louvain).

In a Catholic spirit inspired by Pope Gregory XVI, the promoter and first rector of the university, Monseigneur de Ram, wanted to create a shield that would repulse religion's enemies and block every doctrine weakening the base of Catholic society.

The pharmacy school was founded in 1845 and the engineering school in 1865.

In 1884 the Catholic University of Louvain celebrated its fiftieth anniversary.

In 1968, as a result of linguistic issues, the university was divided into two different universities: one French speaking, which moved to the province of Walloon Brabant, and one Dutch speaking, which remained in the same location.

In 1970, these two universities were established by law as the Katholieke Universiteit te Leuven and Université catholique de Louvain.

In 1971, the first foundation stone was laid in Louvain-la-Neuve, a new city constructed for the French-speaking university.

=== Student population ===
Evolution of the number of students at the University of Louvain, including the FUCaM in Mons that integrated the UCL in 2011, Saint-Louis University, Brussels that formally integrated the university in 2023.

View source data.

== Faculties and schools ==
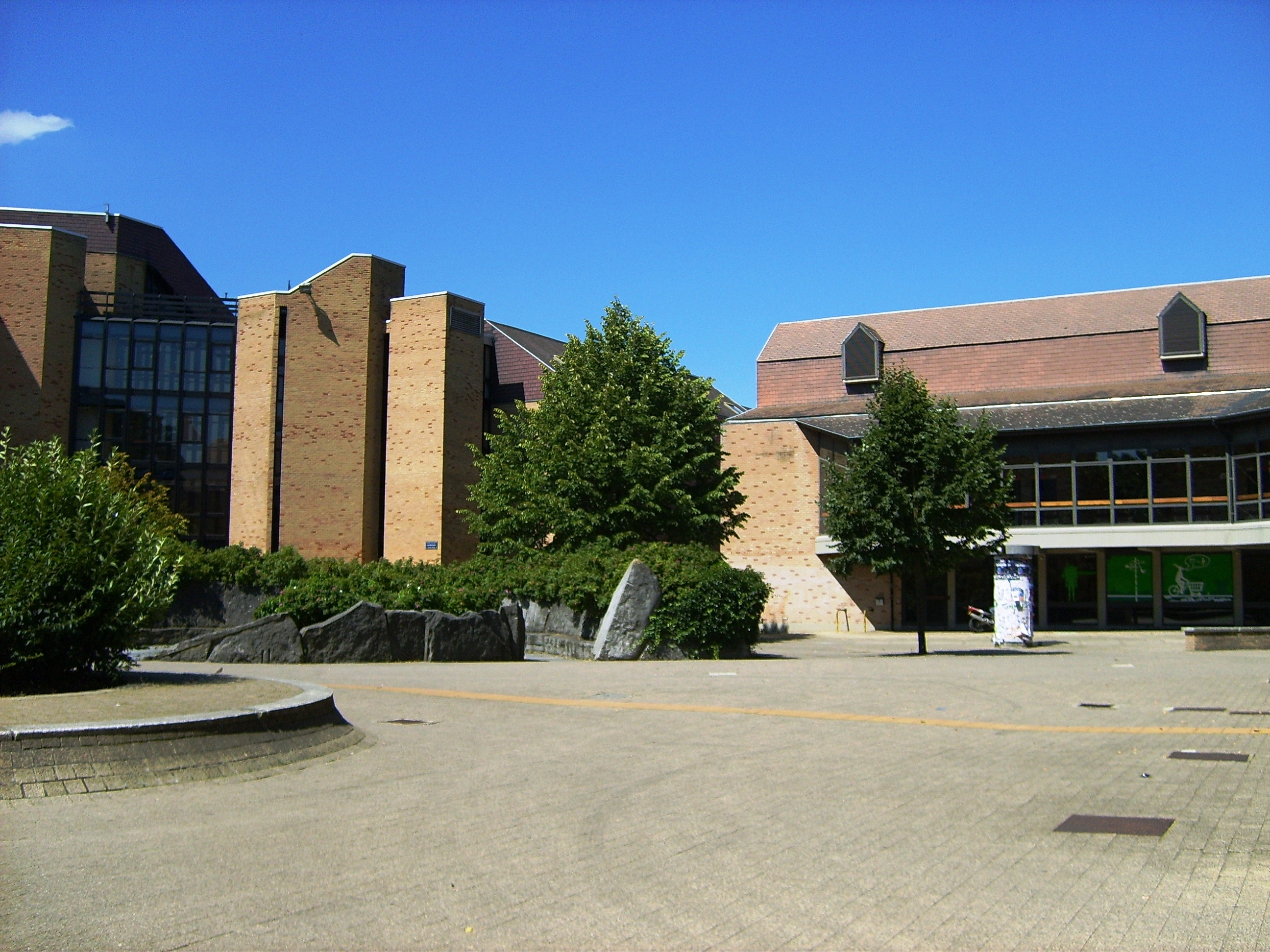
The Montesquieu square in Louvain-la-Neuve, where the Faculty of Law and Criminology is located.

=== Sector of Human Sciences (SSH) ===
- Faculty of Law and Criminology (DRT), Louvain-la-Neuve
  - School of Criminology
- Saint-Louis Faculty of Law (DRTB), Saint-Louis Brussels
- Faculty of Philosophy, Arts and Literature (FIAL), Louvain-la-Neuve
  - Higher Institute of Philosophy (ISP)
  - School of Philosophy (EFIL)
  - Department of Languages and the Arts
    - French and Romance languages and literature (ROM)
    - Modern Languages and Literatures (LMOD)
    - Ancient languages and literatures (classical and oriental) (GLOR)
    - Modern and ancient languages and literature (LAFR)
    - Linguistics (LING)
    - Louvain School of Translation and Interpreting (LSTI)
  - Department of History, Art History and Archaeology
    - History (HIST)
    - Art History, Archaeology and Musicology (ARKE)
  - Department of Information and Communication
    - Multilingual communication (MULT)
    - Performing Arts (THEA)
    - Information and Communication Sciences and Technologies (ICTS)
- Saint-Louis Faculty of Philosophy, Arts and Human Science (PHLB), Saint-Louis Brussels
- Marie Haps Faculty of Translation and Interpreting (TIMB), Saint-Louis Brussels
- Faculty of Economic, Social and Political Sciences and Communication (ESPO), Louvain-la-Neuve, Mons & Charleroi
  - Commission for the Aggregation and In-service Training of Teachers (AGES)
  - School of Communication (COMU)
  - Economics School of Louvain (ESL)
  - Interfaculty School of European Studies (EURO)
  - Hoover Chair - Teaching Commission (HOOV)
  - Open Faculty of Economic and Social Policy (FOPES)
  - Louvain School of Political and Social Sciences (PSAD).
  - Undergraduate Bureau (ESSP)
  - School of Labour Sciences (TRAV)
- Saint-Louis Faculty of Economic, Social and Political Sciences and Communication (ESPB), Saint-Louis Brussels
- Faculty of Psychology and Educational Sciences (PSP), Louvain-la-Neuve
  - School of Psychology (EPSY)
  - School of Speech Therapy (ELOG)
  - School of Education and Training (EDEF)
  - School of Sexology and Family Sciences (ESFA)
- Faculty of Theology (TECO), Louvain-la-Neuve
  - Doctoral School of Theology and Biblical Studies (EDT)
  - Departement of Theology (THEO)
  - Department of Bible Studies (EBIB)
  - Department of Religious studies (SREL)
- Louvain School of Management (LSM), Louvain-la-Neuve, Mons, Namur & Brussels
- Saint-Louis Institute for European Studies (IEEB), Saint-Louis Brussels

The faculties of Philosophy, Arts and Human Sciences, Economic, Social, Political and Communication Sciences (ESPB), Law (DRTB), the Institute for European Studies (IEEB) and the Marie-Haps Faculty of Translating and Interpreting of autonomous UCLouvain Saint-Louis Bruxelles campus are not attached to their corresponding counterparts of UCLouvain.

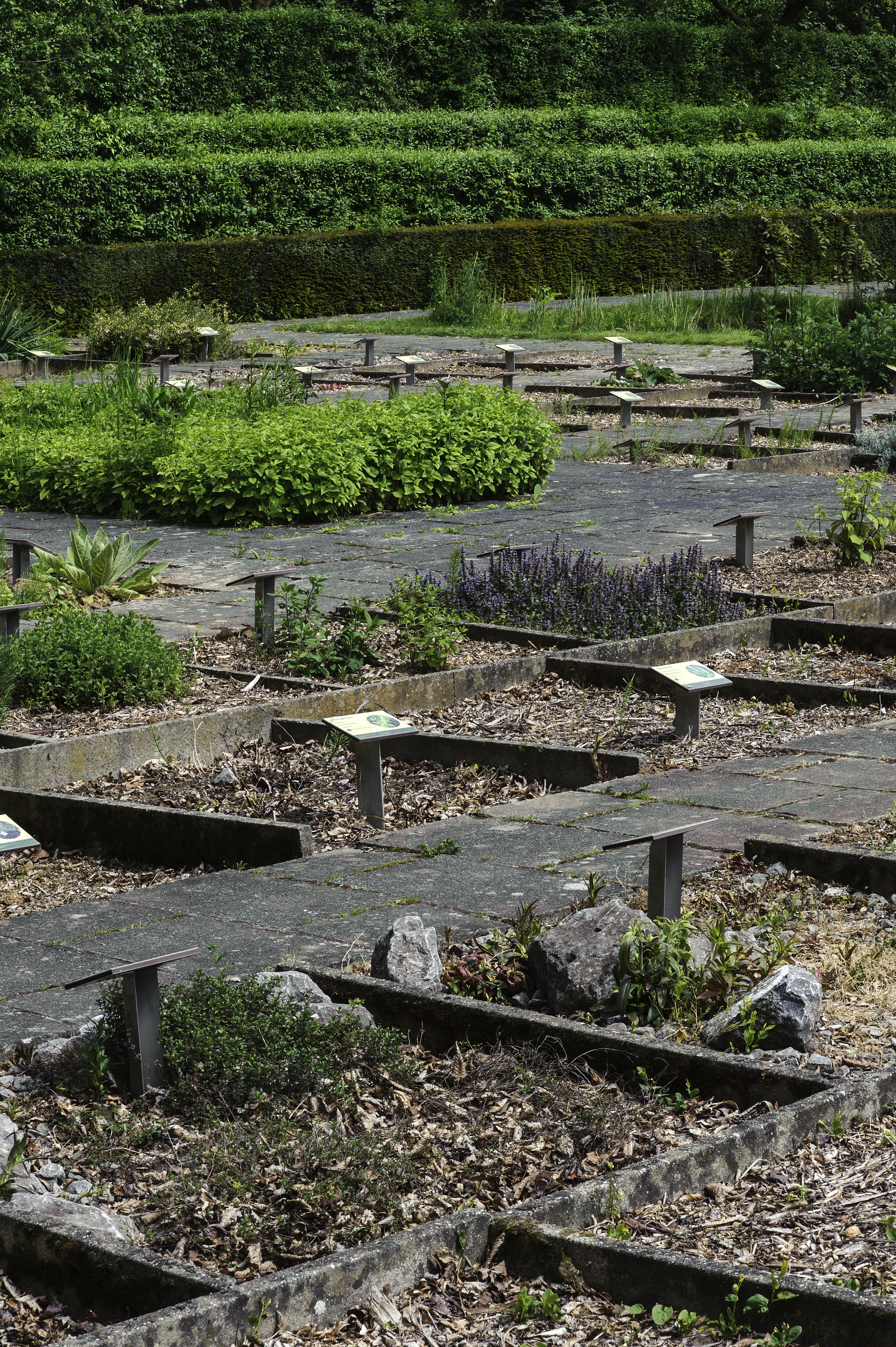
The garden of medicinal plants on campus UCLouvain Bruxelles Woluwe.

=== Sector of Health Sciences (SSS) ===
- Faculty of Medicine and Dentistry (MEDE), Brussels
  - Louvain Medical School (MED)
  - School of Dentistry and Stomatology (MDEN)
- Faculty of Pharmacy and Biomedical Sciences (FASB), Brussels
  - School of Pharmacy (FARM)
  - School of Biomedical Sciences (SBIM)
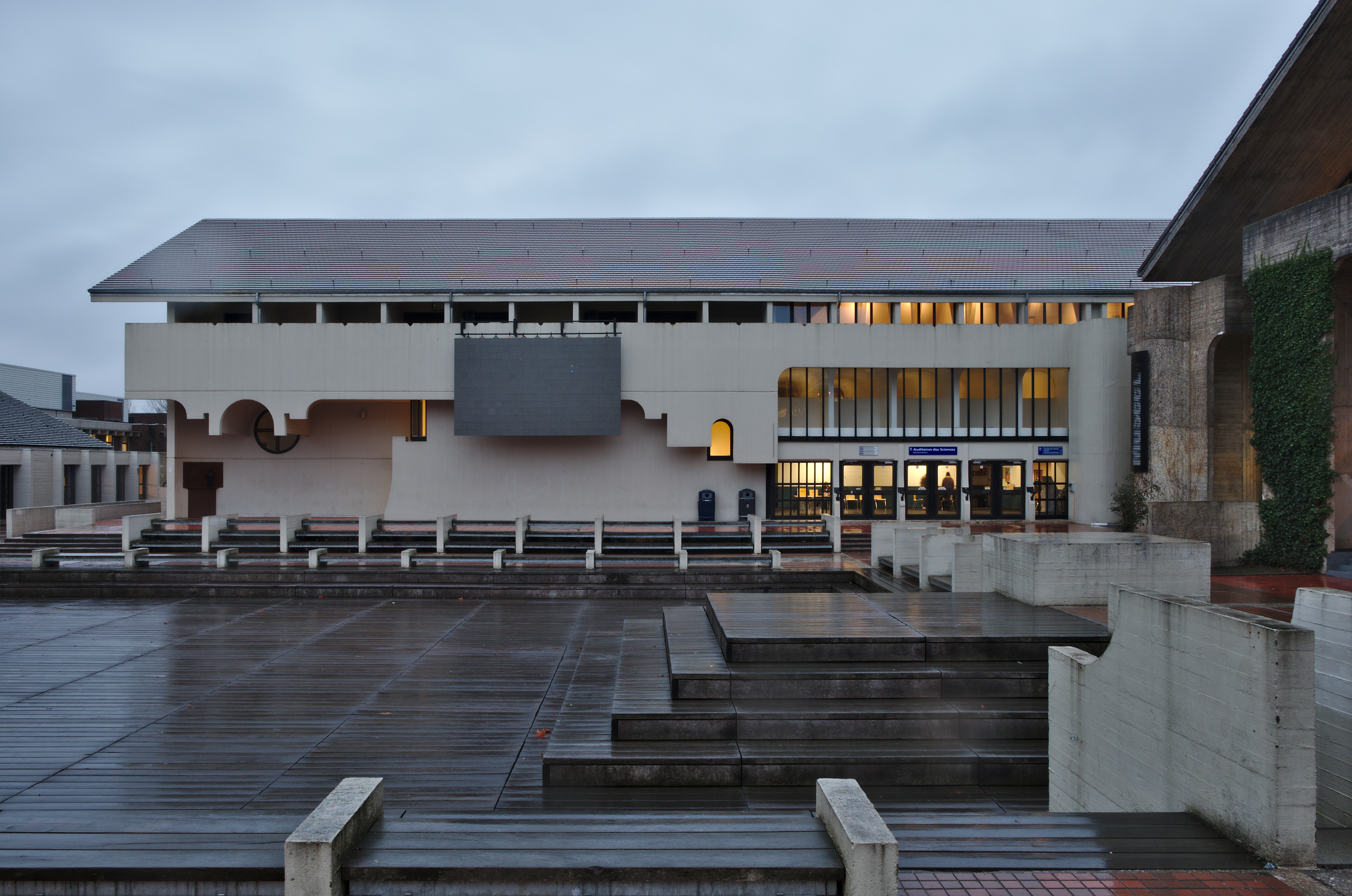
    Auditoires des Sciences and Place des Sciences
- Faculty of Public Health (FSP), Brussels
- Faculty of Motor Sciences (FSM), Louvain-la-Neuve

=== Sector of Science and Technology ===
- Louvain School of Engineering (EPL), École polytechnique de Louvain, Louvain-la-Neuve
  - School of Urban and Spatial Planning (URBA)
- Faculty of Architecture, Architectural Engineering and Urban Planning (LOCI), Brussels, Tournai & Louvain-la-Neuve
- Faculty of Bioengineering (AGRO), Louvain-la-Neuve
  - Department of Applied Biology and Agricultural Production (BAPA)
  - Department of Chemistry and Bioindustries (CABI)
  - Cluster in Environmental Sciences
- Faculty of Science (SC), Louvain-la-Neuve
  - School of Biology (BIOL)
  - School of Chemistry (CHIM)
  - School of Geography (GEOG)
  - School of Physics (PHYS)
  - School of Mathematics (MATH)
  - School of Veterinary Medicine (VETE)
  - School of Statistics, Biostatistics and Actuarial Sciences (LSBA)

== Campuses ==
While the main campus of the University of Louvain is based in Louvain-la-Neuve, it also comprises a campus in Brussels, UCLouvain Brussels Woluwe, in Woluwe-Saint-Lambert, which until recently was called "Louvain-en-Woluwe" hosting the university's sector of medical science and primary academic hospital (8000 students), a campus in Mons called UCLouvain FUCaM Mons (2300 students), a minor installation in Charleroi with 133 students (as of 2011) at UCLouvain Charleroi, an architectural school in Tournai, UCLouvain Tournai, with 540 students (as of 2011), and an architectural school in Brussels, UCLouvain Bruxelles Saint-Gilles, with 570 students (as of 2011). With the merger with Saint-Louis University, it also comprises an independent campus specialized in education and research of social and human sciences in the center of the City of Brussels, UCLouvain Saint-Louis - Bruxelles and the Marie-Haps Faculty of Translating and Interpreting in Ixelles' European quarter, next to the European Parliament (4150 students).

== Hospitals ==
UCLouvain's main medical implementation is in UCLouvain Brussels Woluwe, Woluwe-Saint-Lambert, Brussels, where the faculty of medicine is installed.

- Cliniques universitaires Saint-Luc, Brussels
- CHU UCLouvain Namur, Namur
- CHU UCLouvain Dinant-Godinne, Dinant and Yvoir.
- Centre Hospitalier Neurologique William Lennox, Louvain-la-Neuve

== Museums and collections ==
The UCLouvain hosts Belgium's largest university museum in Louvain-la-Neuve; the Musée L. It exhibits part of the university's 32,000 piece wide collection of art and scientific objects including works of Dürer, Van Dyck, Goya, Rodin, Picasso, Magritte or Alechinski, sculptures, archaeological and ethnographic objects or specimens of natural history.

The UCLouvain FUCaM Mons campus also owns the extended collection of the Convent of the Black Sisters in the city-center of Mons, where the university has placed its Ateliers des FUCaM campus.

UCLouvain Saint-Louis Brussels also owns a classical and modern art collection, primarily paintings recovered from its original campus in Mechelen.

== Rankings ==
University rankings

Global – Overall
- ARWU World: 201–300 (2023)
- CWUR World: 189 (2020-21)
- CWTS World: 312 (2020)
- QS World: =191 (2026)
- THE World: =168 (2024)
- USNWR Global: =171 (2023)

National – Overall
- ARWU National: 4–5 (2024)
- QS National: 3 (2024)
- THE National: 4 (2024)

The University of Louvain educates around 27,261 students from 127 nationalities in all areas of studies at its different campuses. It has educated a large part of Belgium's elite and is still considered, with its Dutch-speaking sister, as a centre of excellence in many fields. In 2006, it was ranked 76th in the world universities ranking established by the Times Higher Education supplement (24th in Europe).

In the 2011 QS World University Rankings the University of Louvain was ranked 125th overall in the world, moving up one place from its position of joint 126th in the 2009 THE–QS World University Rankings (in 2010 Times Higher Education World University Rankings and QS World University Rankings parted ways to produce separate rankings). An overview of the THE-QS Rankings:

QS World University Rankings
Year	Overall rank (Change)	Theology	Philosophy	Economics	Statistics	Social Sciences	Medicine
2015	149 (▲5)	-	31	45	29		
2016	146	-	43	51-100	47		
2017	154	17	33	51-100	51-100	84	105
2018	153	12	32	51-100	51-100	122	124
2019	165	8	51-100	51-100	51-100	94	

== Student activities ==
=== Cercles ===
Cercles are Student Societies or Fraternities based around each faculty. The Cercles, along with the Régionales (which are based around their respective regions of origin) coordinate and manage most of the students' animation and nightlife. Most Cercles run small bars to fund their activities, and also jointly operate a larger nightclub, "La Casa".

Cercles and Régionales are run exclusively by member students known as the committee. These members are elected every year, usually by voting from all members (active or otherwise) wishing to participate, although some Cercles restrict the number of possible voters in some cases.

Aside from promoting student folklore and coordinating student animation, Cercles also offer academic aid to students in their respective faculties and organize more cultural activities, such as visits to museums and/or other cities, conferences, and low-cost trips for students (for example skiing in the Alps during the Winter Break).

Every Cercle and Régionale has its own customs and traditions, but some are practiced by all:

The Baptême (French: baptism) is a hazing ceremony used by most to induct new members, who then participate in a number of trials and activities involving eggs and other foodstuff, paint, demeaning chants etc. Baptized members (les Baptisés) are among the most common type of members, and some Cercles and Régionales try to only accept new members this way, although it is in no way an obligation to be baptized in order to be a part of a Cercle or to frequent them.

The calotte is a Belgian student cap worn by students attending Catholic universities. They are emblems of student folklore dating back to the late 19th century. Nowadays, most calottes are passed by way of a ceremony known as the coronae. How they are passed and what must be known or done to deserve it depends on the Cercle or Régionale. One thing that is universally known, is that there is a lot of singing involved.

Cercles are notorious for their generally high intake of alcohol (especially beer) and low level of cleanliness. Students tend to wear old clothes that they don't mind damaging or dirtying as a consequence, and the overall ambiance is more akin to a rave or a frat-party than a nightclub or sports bar.

=== Kots ===
Student accommodation in Belgium comes in the form of a "kot", a term having Belgian Dutch origin. A "kot" can be translated as den or hut. The French way to form the plural of "kot" is "kots" (in Dutch, the plural of "kot" is "koten"). In the bilingual region of Brussels, where there are both Dutch- and French-speaking universities and their students, it is common that "for rent" signs are in French only, with the French plural of "kot".

=== Kot-à-projet ===
Unique to UCLouvain a Kot-à-projet (kap) is a kot whose inhabitants have similar interests and who organise activities for the general student population, they are similar to Fraternity and sorority houses, but smaller in size with only the committee living in the kot and without the hazing rituals seen in Regions and Cercles. Being small several Kots can be situated in the same, university owned, apartment building. One of them is "le kap contes", a kot promoting the art of storytelling. Another is called "Kap Délices" which suggests varied activities such as theme buffets, cooking lessons, and material renting.

=== Student Union ===
The AGL (General Assembly of Louvain students) is the UCLouvain's Students' union. The body comprises an executive Committee, and a legislative Council. The Committee consists of ex-officio members: President, Vice-Presidents for Education & Welfare, VP for the Medicine faculty (situated in UCLouvain Brussels Woluwe), General Secretary, Activities Officer, Communications Officer, Operations Officer, Foreign student's Officer, Cultural Officer, Editor-in-Chief & Deputy Editor-in-Chief as well as the president of the council.

=== Publications ===
Quinzaine a university produced newsletter, La Savate produced by the AGL and the monthly l'étincelle by the Kot-à-projet KAP Etincelle. Cercles also produce publications.

=== 24h Vélo ===
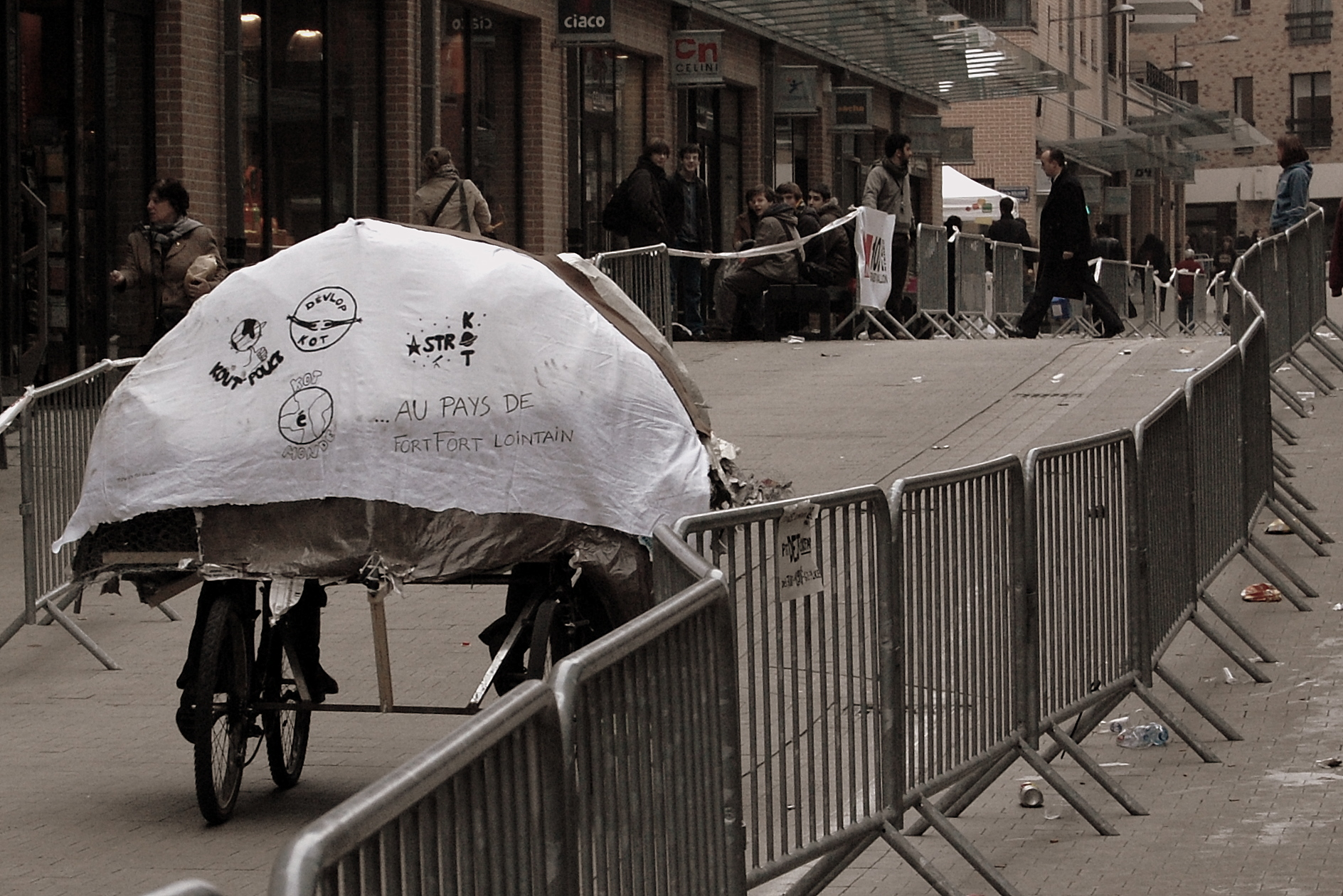
A fanciful bike float at the 24h vélo de Louvain-la-Neuve

The 24 Hour Cycle (24h Vélo) is, nominally, a bicycle endurance road race held in October, organised by CSE Animations (Centre Sportif Etudiant). While there is an elite race with teams of two, Student groups enter novelty themed multi-bike vehicles, in the shape of a Van or Whale for example, for prizes. The quality of these designs range in terms of artistic merit, and ability to stay intact over the duration of the race. A 240-minute race also takes place for teenagers. The event is probably best known for what happens off the track. Concurrent with the race is Belgium's largest student event, with concerts and stands lasting the full 24hrs.

== Notable people ==
=== Faculty ===
- Paul Pascon, sociologist

=== Alumni ===
- Christian Arnsperger (b. 1966), economist
- Nimer Assy, (b. 1961) hepatologist
- Irene Bertschek, economist, Professor at University of Giessen, head of ZEW (Leibniz Centre for European Economic Research)
- Thierry Braspenning Balzacq, professor of political sciences and international relations
- Rafael Correa (b. 1963), Ex-President of Ecuador
- Xavier De Cuyper, agricultural engineer
- Alexis Deswaef (b. 1969), human rights lawyer
- Zaynab El Bernoussi, political scientist
- Maryellen Fullerton, lawyer and professor and interim dean at Brooklyn Law School
- Archduchess Maria-Anna, Princess Galitzine, (b. 1954), Catholic activist
- Véronique Gouverneur, (b. 1964), professor of chemistry
- Dyab Abou Jahjah, (b. 1971), Lebanese-Belgian political activist
- Oly Ilunga Kalenga, (b. 1960), Minister of Health for the Democratic Republic of the Congo
- Carlos Larraín, President of National Renewal (Chile)
- Raïssa Malu, Congolese physicist, international education consultant, writer and politician
- Queen Mathilde of Belgium (b. 1973)
- Joëlle Milquet (b. 1961), law, politician
- António Mascarenhas Monteiro (1944–2016), judge (law) and first democratically elected president of Cape Verde
- Pierre De Muelenaere (b. 1958), entrepreneur
- Philippe Van Parijs (b. 1951), philosopher and economist
- David Payne (b. 1944), politician
- Gustavo Petro, (b. 1960), President of Colombia 2022 - 2026
- Grégoire Polet (b. 1978), French-speaking Belgian writer, laureate of several literary prizes
- Arnoud de Pret de Calesberg, commercial sciences, InBev
- María Cecilia Rivara, Chilean computer scientist
- Ronald Rolheiser, O.M.I. (b. 1947), President of the Oblate School of Theology, San Antonio, Texas
- Páll Skúlason (b. 1945), philosopher and former Rector of the University of Iceland
- Vera Songwe, economist
- Walter Swennen, artist
- Sophie Warny (b. 1969), Belgian Antarctic researcher
- Nor Mohamed Yakcop, (b. 1947) Malaysian politician, Malaysian Minister in the Prime Minister's Department, in charge of Economic Planning Unit.
- Jean-Pascal van Ypersele, (b. 1957) climatology

== See also ==
- Academic libraries in Leuven
- Belgian Co-ordinated Collections of Micro-organisms (BCCM)
- Catholic University of Mechlin
- Centre for Research on the Epidemiology of Disasters (CRED)
- Collegium Trilingue
- Louvain-la-Neuve Cyclotron
- Lovanium University
- Open access in Belgium
- Orchestre Symphonique des Étudiants de Louvain-la-Neuve
- Science Parks of Wallonia
- University Foundation
- List of split up universities

== Notes ==
A. The Old University of Leuven (1425) is the oldest university in the low countries, and the Catholic University of Leuven (1834) is sometimes, controversially, identified as a continuation of it. Belgium's highest court, the Court of Cassation has ruled that the (1834) Catholic University of Leuven cannot be regarded as continuing the old (1425) University of Leuven. See Old University of Leuven#History.
B. This is a relatively recent phenomenon. In 1859 the university celebrated its 25th anniversary and issued a book celebrating the 25 anniversary of the founding of the Catholic University of Louvain, November 3, 1859. In 1884, the university celebrated its 50th anniversary, acknowledging its actual date of foundation. Only in 1968 did the new Catholic university add the date 1425 to its neo-gothic seal (created in 1909).
