= Vincent Blondel =

Belgian mathematician and politician (born 1965)

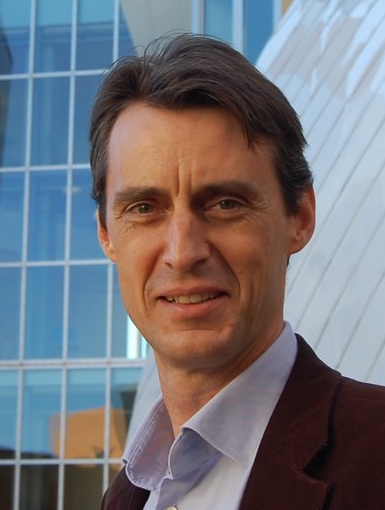

President of the Senate
- Incumbent
- Assumed office 3 February 2025
- Preceded by: Valérie De Bue

Member of the Senate
- Incumbent
- Assumed office 18 July 2024
- Appointed by: Parliament of Wallonia

Member of the Parliament of Wallonia
- Incumbent
- Assumed office 25 June 2024
- Constituency: Arrondissement of Nivelles

Rector of the University of Louvain
- In office 1 September 2014 – 9 February 2024
- Preceded by: Bruno Delvaux
- Succeeded by: Didier Lambert

Personal details
- Born: Vincent Daniel Blondel; 28 April 1965 (age 61) Antwerp, Belgium
- Party: Les Engagés (2023–present)
- Children: 4
- Parent: Alfred Blondel (father)
- Relatives: François Blondel (brother)
- Education: UCLouvain; Imperial College, London
- Occupation: Mathematician • Professor • Politician

Vincent Blondel

Academic background
- Education: UCLouvain; Imperial College, London

Academic work
- Institutions: Université catholique de Louvain (1995–2024); Massachusetts Institute of Technology (2010–2011)
- Notable ideas: Louvain method Applied mathematics Discrete mathematics

Vincent Daniel Blondel (French pronunciation: [vɛ̃sɑ̃ blɔ̃dɛl]; born 28 April 1965) is a Belgian professor of applied mathematics and former rector of the University of Louvain (UCLouvain) and a visiting professor at the Massachusetts Institute of Technology (MIT). He is also a politician for Les Engagés and has served as President of the Senate since 2025.

Blondel's research lies in the area of mathematical control theory and theoretical computer science. He is mostly known for his contributions in computational complexity in control, multi-agent coordination and complex networks.

== Education ==
Blondel studied philosophy, mathematics, engineering and computer science in Louvain-la-Neuve, Grenoble, London and Oxford. He completed a master thesis in engineering at the Institut National Polytechnique de Grenoble, he holds a MSc in mathematics from Imperial College of Science and Technology and a degree in philosophy, a master's degree in engineering (summa cum laude) and a PhD in applied mathematics from Université catholique de Louvain.

== Career ==
In 1993-1994 he was a Göran Gustafsson Fellow at the Royal Institute of Technology (Stockholm) and in 1994-1995 he was a Research Fellow at the National Institute for Research in Computer Science and Control (INRIA) in Paris. From 1995 to 1999 he was an assistant professor at the Institute of Mathematics of the Université de Liège before joining the Louvain School of Engineering of UCLouvain where he has been since then. He was a research visitor with the Australian National University, the University of California at Berkeley, the Santa Fe Institute, the Mittag-Leffler Institute of the Royal Swedish Academy of Sciences and Harvard University. He was a visiting professor of the Ecole Nationale Supérieure in Lyon in 1998 and at the Université Paris VII - Diderot in 1999, 2000 and 2002. In 2005-2006 he was a visiting professor and a Fulbright scholar with the Department of Electrical Engineering and Computer Science of the Massachusetts Institute of Technology. In 2010-2011 he was a visiting professor with the MIT Laboratory for Information and Decision Systems (LIDS) of the Massachusetts Institute of Technology.

Blondel is a former associate editor of the European Journal of Control (Springer) and of Systems and Control Letters (Elsevier). He is an editor of the journal Mathematics of Control, Signals, and Systems He has published about 100 journal articles and 6 books.

At UCLouvain, Blondel has founded the Group on Large Graphs and Networks. He has supervised 20 doctoral and postdoctoral researchers and 15 visiting professors. He was department head in 2003-2010 and a university president candidate in 2009.

In 2013, Blondel has become the dean of the Louvain School of Engineering.

He was elected the Rector of the University of Louvain for the term 2014-2019, and reelected again in 2019 until 2024.

== Honors and awards ==
- Awarded the IEEE Control Systems Society Antonio Ruberti Young Researcher Prize in 2006 "For fundamental contributions to control theory, especially stabilization, computational complexity issues, and decidability".
- Named a Fellow of the Institute of Electrical and Electronics Engineers (IEEE) in 2013 for his contributions to computational analysis of systems and networks.

== Teaching ==
In 2012, he is in charge of the following courses at UCLouvain :

- LINMA 1691 : Discrete mathematics I : Graphs algorithmics and theory
- LINMA 1702 : Optimisation Models and Methods
- LINMA 2111 : Discrete mathematics II: Algorithms and complexity
- LINMA 2120 : System theory seminar
- LINMA 2472 : Special questions about discrete mathematics.

The last course is following the online course of M. Chiang from Princeton University : "20Q about networks : Friends, Money and Bytes"
