= María Cecilia Rivara =

Chilean computer scientist

María Cecilia Rivara Zúñiga is a Chilean computer scientist known for her research in mesh refinement for the finite element method. She is a professor of computer science at the University of Chile, where she was the first woman to earn an engineer's degree in mathematics.

== Education and career ==
Rivara earned an engineer's degree in mathematics in 1973 from the University of Chile, the first woman to do so. She went to the Catholic University of Louvain in Belgium for graduate study, earning a master's degree in 1980 and completing her Ph.D. in 1984, supervised by Robert Piessens. She is a full professor at the University of Chile.

== Research ==
In the study of mesh refinement, subdividing selected triangles of a triangular finite element mesh by bisecting their longest edges is also known as Rivara refinement, after Rivara's pioneering work on this method.
