= Kot (lodging) =

Belgian student shared accommodation

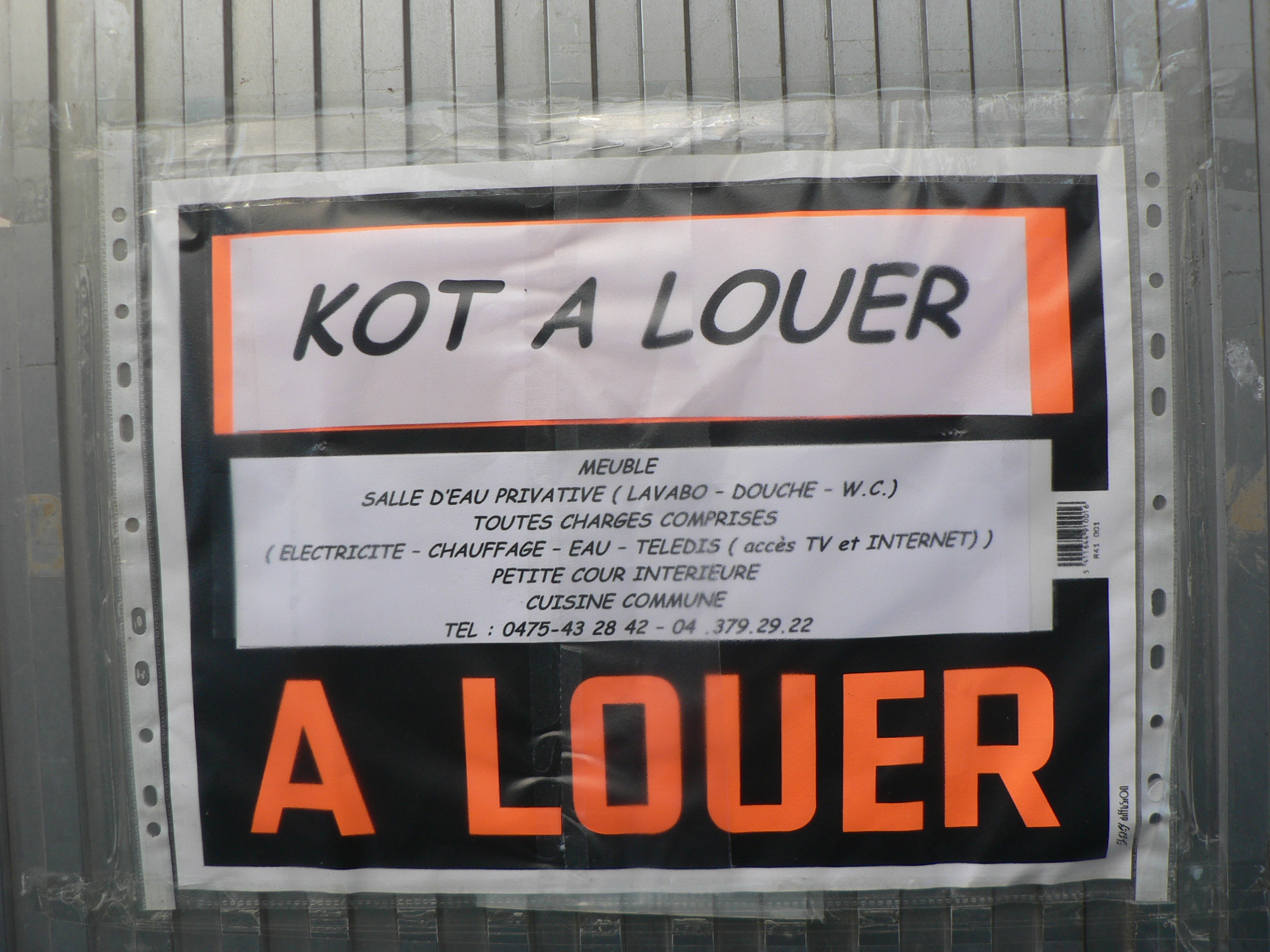
Sign advertising the availability of a kot

A kot (diminutive kotje) is a type of student housing privately rented during the academic or school year in Belgium. The word kot is used in both Belgian Dutch and Belgian French, but not in standard Dutch or standard French.

== Etymology ==
The word comes from Flemish and means small shelter, nest, cabin (as in friet kot, a chip shed, or kot à poule, a chicken coop). It can also even refer to slums. This term specifically used in Belgium refers to a cupboard (un kot à balais, a broom cupboard) and by extension any small room such as a student room. It emphasizes the narrow aspect which is typically encountered in such housing.

These kots can be either individual or part of a shared house, in which a certain area is public (the kitchen, the toilets and showers, etc.) casually called "commu" (rooms shared in common).

The word kot belongs to the Dunkirk dialect, in which it's pronounced “kotsheu“ (a small kot), meaning a shed, a garden shed, a junk room.

Derived words include:

- the verb kotter ("to kot"), which means to rent and inhabit a kot, usually only during the week
- the nouns kotteur and kotteuse refer to the tenant of a kot and often by extension to every student living outside the family home
- the nouns cokotteur or cokotier and cokotteuse (or cokotière), which mean flatmate.

== Project kots ==
Some community kots take part in a project, in particular in Louvain-la-Neuve. These "project kots" offer a large variety of activities. The project could be organizing a weekly spaghetti party, homework support, supporting a humanitarian organization. The only boundary is the creativity in management skills and the ability to bring people together.
