= Coimbra Group =

Association of universities across Europe

- Abbreviation: CG
- Location: University Foundation, Brussels
- Executive Board Chair: Ludovic Thilly; University of Poitiers
- Office Director: Emmanuelle Gardan
- Website: www.coimbra-group.eu

The Coimbra Group (CG) is an international association of 42 universities in Europe. It was established in 1985. It works for the benefit of its members by promoting "internationalization, academic collaboration, excellence in learning and research, and service to society" through "creating special academic and cultural ties", by lobbying at the European level, and by developing best-practice.

== History ==
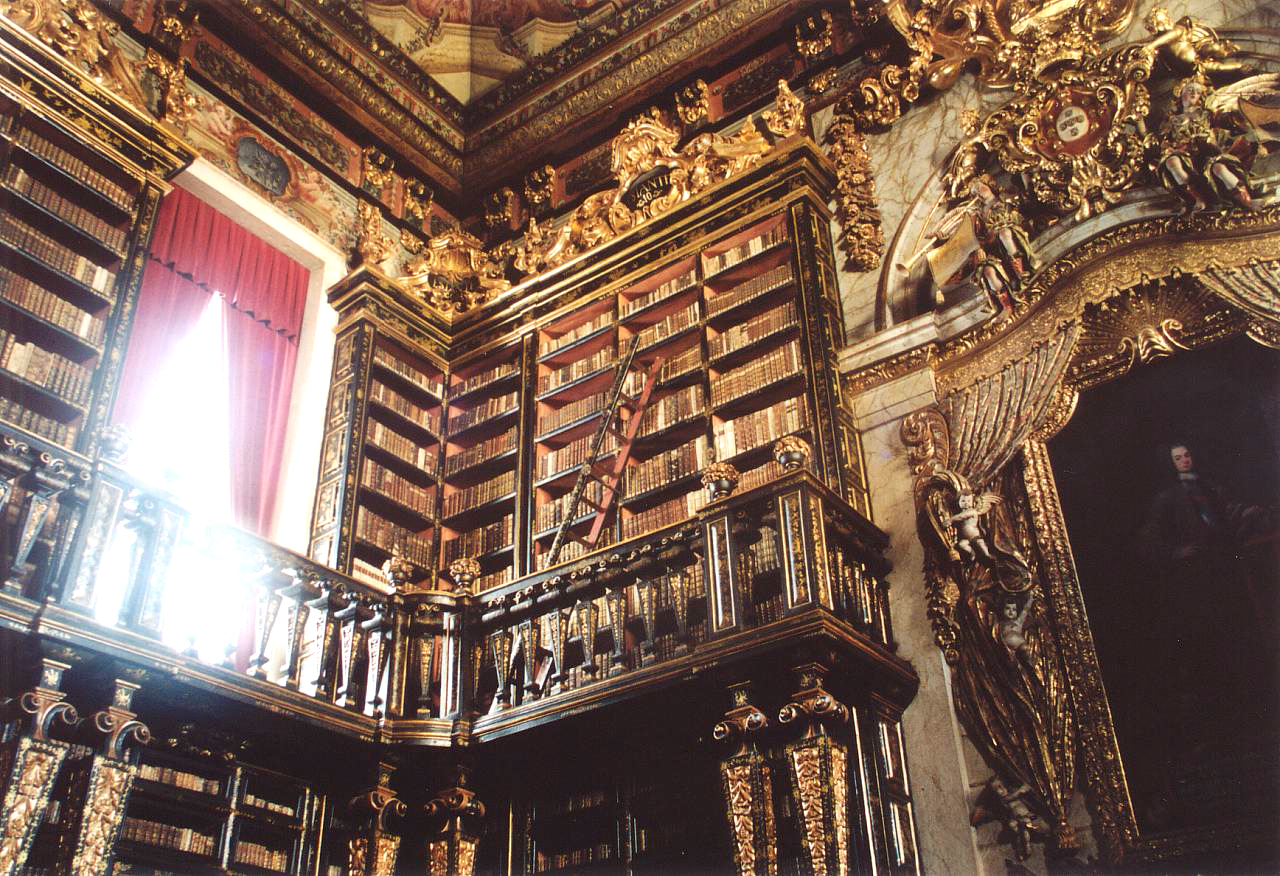
The group takes its name from the city of Coimbra, Portugal and the university located there.

The Coimbra Group was founded in 1985 and formally constituted in 1987 by a charter signed between its members, then numbering 19. In 1994, it published Charters of Foundation and Early Documents of the Universities of the Coimbra Group. A second edition was published in 2005, by which time Caen had left the group while Bergen, Geneva, Graz, Lyon, Padua, Tartu and Turku had joined.

By 2013, the group consisted of 40 universities, but by the following year this had fallen to 37 with the departures of the Aristotle University of Thessaloniki (Greece), the University of Cambridge (UK) and the University of Oxford (UK). Since then, the Group has added Vilnius University (Lithuania) in June 2015 and Durham University (UK) in June 2016. This brought the membership of the group to 39, but it subsequently fell to 38 in October 2016, when the University of Lyon (France) decided to leave the Group. At the General Assembly in June 2017, the University of Cologne was invited to join as the 39th member, while Utrecht University joined the group in December 2020.

The University of Göttingen withdrew from the group in December 2024. In June 2025, the University of Leeds, Newcastle University and the University of Wrocław joined, bringing the current number of members to 42.

== Members ==
As of June 2025, the Coimbra Group includes 42 universities in 22 countries:

Institution	Country
University of Graz	Austria
Katholieke Universiteit Leuven	Belgium
Université catholique de Louvain	Belgium
Charles University, Prague	Czechia
Aarhus University	Denmark
University of Tartu	Estonia
Åbo Akademi University, Turku	Finland
University of Turku	Finland
University of Montpellier	France
Paul Valéry University Montpellier 3	France
University of Poitiers	France
Heidelberg University	Germany
University of Jena	Germany
University of Cologne	Germany
University of Würzburg	Germany
Eötvös Loránd University, Budapest	Hungary
University of Galway	Ireland
Trinity College Dublin	Ireland
University of Bologna	Italy
University of Padua	Italy
University of Pavia	Italy
University of Siena	Italy
Vilnius University	Lithuania
University of Groningen	Netherlands
Leiden University	Netherlands
Utrecht University	Netherlands
University of Bergen	Norway
Jagiellonian University, Kraków	Poland
University of Wrocław	Poland
University of Coimbra	Portugal
Alexandru Ioan Cuza University, Iași	Romania
University of Barcelona	Spain
University of Granada	Spain
University of Salamanca	Spain
Uppsala University	Sweden
University of Geneva	Switzerland
Istanbul University	Turkey
Durham University	United Kingdom
University of Bristol	United Kingdom
University of Edinburgh	United Kingdom
University of Leeds	United Kingdom
Newcastle University	United Kingdom

=== Former ===
- University of Caen (France)
- University of Cambridge (UK)
- University of Lyon (France)
- University of Oxford (UK)
- Aristotle University of Thessaloniki (Greece)
- Saint Petersburg State University (Russia)
- University of Göttingen (Germany)
