= CESAER =

European non-profit association

- Formation: 10 May 1990; 36 years ago
- Founded at: Leuven
- Type: Educational
- Headquarters: Castle of Arenberg, Leuven, Belgium
- Region served: Europe
- President: Orla Feely
- Secretary General: Mattias Björnmalm
- Website: cesaer.org

CESAER is a non-profit association of universities of science and technology in Europe. CESAER was founded on 10 May 1990, seated in the Castle of Arenberg in Leuven, Belgium. The association has 57 universities of science and technology in 25 countries. The name CESAER was formed as an abbreviation for "Conference of European Schools for Advanced Engineering Education and Research", but today only the short form CESAER is used.

The combined member institutions of the association have over 1.25 million students enrolled and employ over 107,000 academic staff. The current President until the end of 2027 is Orla Feely, president of University College Dublin.

== Members ==
The most up-to-date list of Members of CESAER is provided at https://www.cesaer.org/members/

Country	Institution(s)
Austria	Graz University of Technology; TU Wien
Belgium	Ghent University; KU Leuven; University of Louvain
Czech Republic	Brno University of Technology
Denmark	Aalborg University
Finland	Aalto University
France	Grenoble Alpes University; Institut national des sciences appliquées de Lyon; Polytechnic Institute of Paris; Paris Tech; Paris-Saclay University
Germany	Karlsruhe Institute of Technology; Leibniz University Hannover; RWTH Aachen University; Technische Universität Berlin; Technische Universität Braunschweig; Technische Universität Darmstadt; Technische Universität Dresden; University of Stuttgart
Greece	National Technical University of Athens
Hungary	Budapest University of Technology and Economics
Ireland	University College Dublin
Israel	Technion – Israel Institute of Technology
Italy	Polytechnic University of Milan; Polytechnic University of Turin; Sapienza University of Rome
Netherlands	Delft University of Technology; University of Twente
Norway	Norwegian University of Science and Technology
Poland	Gdańsk University of Technology; Poznań University of Technology; Warsaw University of Technology; Wrocław University of Science and Technology
Portugal	Instituto Superior Técnico; Universidade NOVA de Lisboa; University of Porto
Romania	National University of Science and Technology Politehnica Bucharest; Technical University of Cluj-Napoca
Serbia	University of Belgrade
Slovakia	Slovak University of Technology in Bratislava
Spain	Polytechnic University of Catalonia; Polytechnic University of Madrid; Polytechnic University of Valencia
Sweden	Chalmers University of Technology; KTH Royal Institute of Technology; Lund University
Switzerland	École Polytechnique Fédérale de Lausanne; ETH Zurich
Turkey	Istanbul Technical University
Ukraine	National Technical University of Ukraine - Igor Sikorsky Kyiv Polytechnic Institute
United Kingdom	Queen's University Belfast; University of Sheffield; University of Southampton; University of Strathclyde; University of Surrey
