= Guild of European Research-Intensive Universities =

European university network

The Guild of European Research-Intensive Universities
- Formation: 2016
- Type: Education and research
- Headquarters: Brussels, Belgium
- Region served: Europe
- Members: 23
- Secretary-General: Prof. Jan Palmowski
- Website: www.the-guild.eu

The Guild of European Research-Intensive Universities (also called The Guild) is a university network founded in 2016. It currently comprises 23 of Europe's research-intensive universities in 17 countries.

The Guild released a series of position papers as part of the European Commission's consultation for Horizon 2020, Horizon Europe and the next Framework Programme (FP10).

Its current Chair is Anders Hagfeldt, Vice-Chancellor Uppsala University, in Sweden.

== Members ==
Since 2025, the group is made up of the following universities:

Country	Institution
Austria	University of Vienna
Belgium	Ghent University
Belgium	UCLouvain
Denmark	Aarhus University
Estonia	University of Tartu
France	Université Paris Cité
France	Université PSL
Germany	University of Tübingen
Germany	University of Göttingen
Italy	University of Bologna
Luxembourg	University of Luxembourg
Netherlands	University of Groningen
Netherlands	Radboud University
Norway	University of Oslo
Poland	Jagiellonian University
Romania	Babeș-Bolyai University
Slovenia	University of Ljubljana
Spain	Pompeu Fabra University
Sweden	Uppsala University
Switzerland	University of Bern
United Kingdom	University of Glasgow
United Kingdom	King's College London
United Kingdom	University of Warwick

== See also ==
- List of higher education associations and alliances
