= CLUSTER =

Consortium Linking Universities of Science and Technology for Education and Research (CLUSTER) is a collection of twelve European universities which focus on science and engineering. There are joint programs and student exchanges held between the universities. The focus of the network is courses and study programmes, the goal being to offer students attractive exchanges between the best institutes of technology in Europe, along with dual degree partnerships at second- and third-cycle level, joint funding applications for courses and study programmes, exchanges for benchmarking purposes and approaches to policy issues at EU level.

The CLUSTER presidency changes every two years. The president for 2024-2026 is Stefano Paolo Corgnati, Rector of Politecnico di Torino.

== Members ==
=== Active members ===
The participating universities are:

University	Country
Kungliga Tekniska Högskolan	Sweden
Politecnico di Torino	Italy
KU Leuven	Belgium
Karlsruhe Institute of Technology	Germany
Grenoble Institute of Technology	France
Instituto Superior Técnico	Portugal
Trinity College Dublin	Ireland
Aalto University	Finland
TU Darmstadt	Germany
Eindhoven University of Technology	Netherlands
École Polytechnique de Louvain	Belgium
Polytechnic University of Catalonia	Spain

=== Associate members ===
Although the number of Cluster members has remained stable over the years, the network is creating new connections with leading universities outside Europe. These associated members are:

University	Country
Polytechnique Montréal	Canada
University of São Paulo	Brazil
