= Université de Namur =

Belgian university

Coordinates: 50°27′58.80″N 4°51′37.36″E

University of Namur
- Université de Namur
- Former seal of the University of Namur
- Type: Catholic
- Established: 1831; 195 years ago
- Rector: Annick Castiaux
- Students: 7,236 (2023–2024)
- Location: Namur, Belgium
- Website: www.unamur.be
- Data as of 2024

The University of Namur or Université de Namur (UNamur) is a Jesuit university in Namur, in the French Community of Belgium. Both teaching and research in the university are carried out by six faculties.

== Location ==
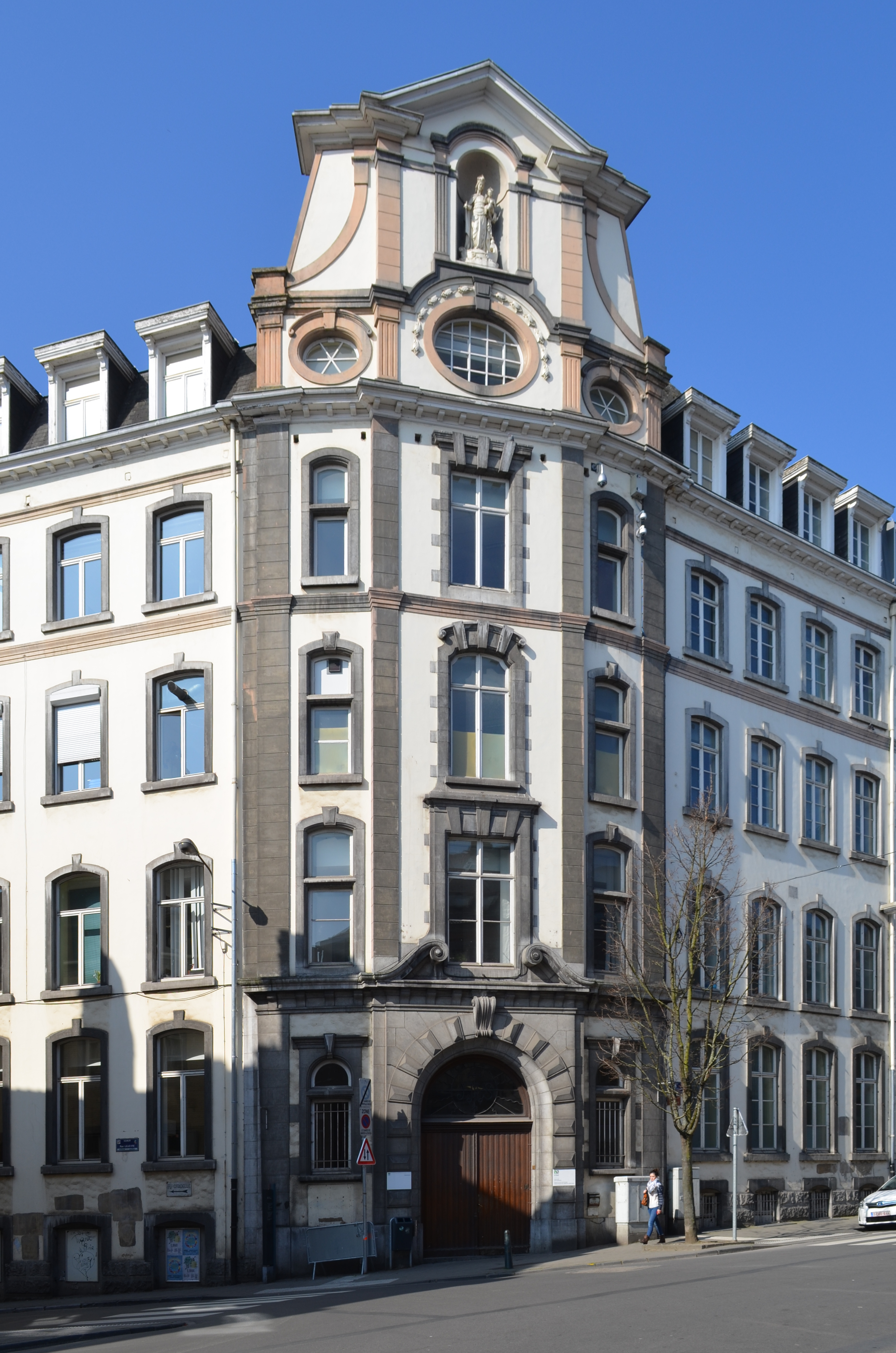

The University of Namur is located in Namur, Belgium. The main campus is located at the heart of the city of Namur, capital of Wallonia. The main university campus includes the university building, the six main faculties and the university libraries.

== History ==
=== Foundation 1831–1846 ===
In the spring of 1831, the Society of Jesus reopened a high school in what was earlier the Our-Lady of Peace Benedictine abbey, in Namur. The school immediately developed into a college with the support of prominent Namurian families. They put some conditions in order to finance the new project, the most important is teaching other sciences such as philosophy with the liberty of education as proclaimed by the new Belgian Constitution.

=== First expansions (1846–1928) ===
Many expansions took place in this period, the number of students increased gradually, new sciences and study programmes were introduced.

=== Sensible progress (1929–1947) ===
A New Belgian law excluded the institution from getting financial support from the government. This pushed the ambitious university to rely on its own sources and funds. Despite this, in 1934, many projects were launched: new building specific to physical and chemical studies, the expansion of Belles-Lettres library, modernization of some laboratories, many new titles were added to the seminars library.

=== Resuming the expansion (1948–1970) ===
On 18 February 1948 the institution, formerly a college, changed its status to that of a university. This new status resulted in having some (limited and irregular) financial aid from the government.

Starting in 1960, after the introduction of new national financing laws, government aid increased and became regular. Many new projects and programmes came into being, improving the university's national and European visibility.

=== The big expansion (1971–1991) ===
The university launched many important projects:

- 1971: Institute of Computer Science (now Faculty of Computer Science): the first of its kind in Belgium and one of the leading institutions in Europe.
- 1972: Faculty of Law.
- 1974: Faculty of Sciences, Faculty of Medicine.
- 1979: New university library Moretus Plantin (more than 800,000 title at the time).
- 1990: Construction of Pedro Arrupe new amphitheater.
- 2015 : New amphitheater Vauban
- 2014-2017 : New Faculty of Sciences

== Prospects ==
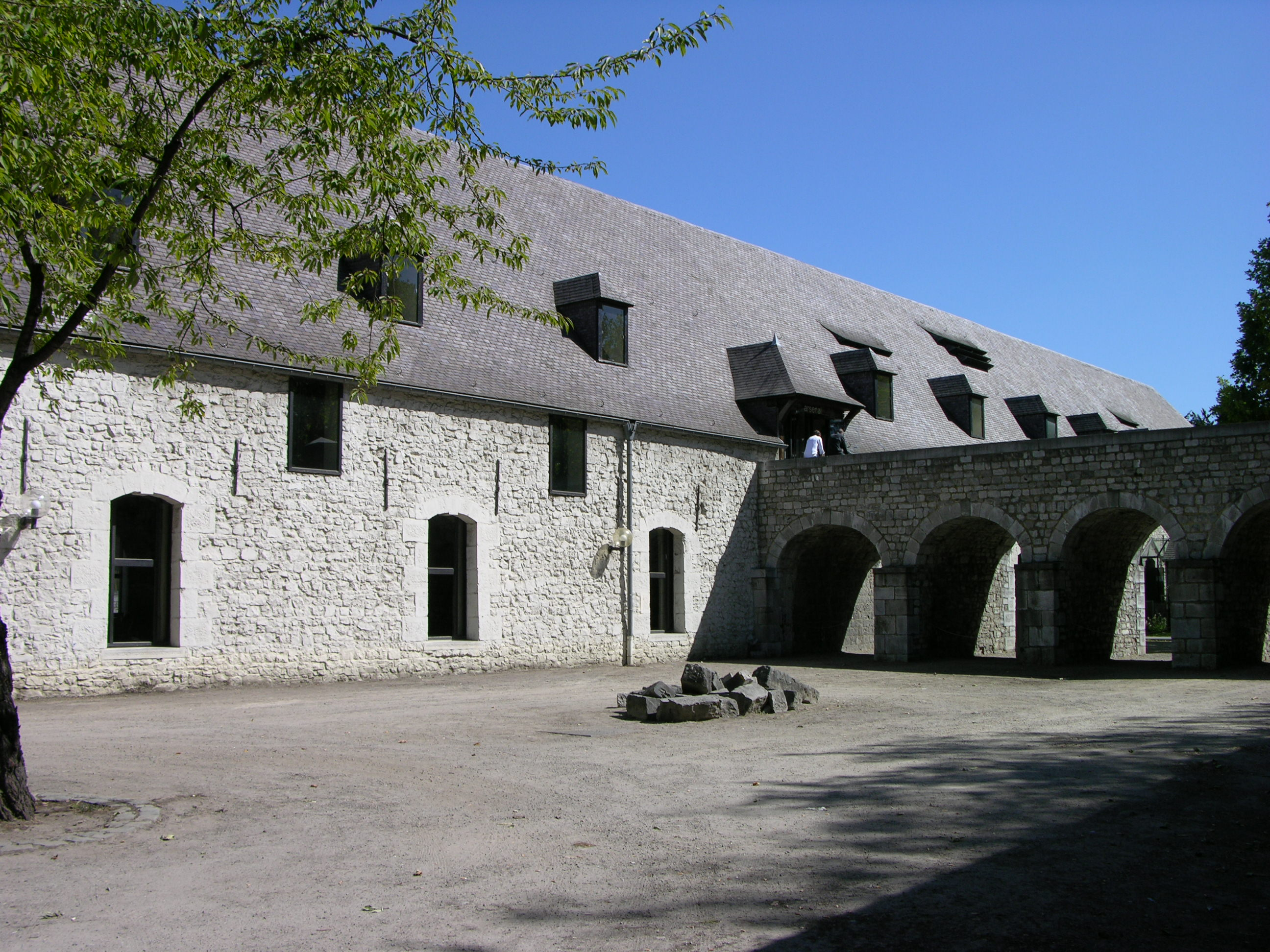
Arsenal de Namur, the restaurant of the university

On 29 June 2003 the University of Namur joined with three other French-speaking Catholic universities to form the Académie Louvain. These are the University of Louvain (UCLouvain), located in Louvain-La-Neuve; Saint-Louis University, Brussels (now UCLouvain Saint-Louis - Bruxelles), located in Brussels and Ixelles; and the Facultés universitaires catholiques de Mons, (FUCaM, now UCLouvain FUCaM Mons) located in Mons and Charleroi (now UCLouvain Charleroi).

Explorations developed in 2007 for combining all four institutions into a single university, and an agreement was reached to create a new university to be called Université catholique de Louvain (Académie Louvain Project). Campuses might be identified as UCL/Brussels (today UCLouvain Bruxelles), UCL/Namur (today UCLouvain Namur), UCL/Louvain-la-Neuve, UCL/Mons (today UCLouvain FUCaM Mons) and UCL/Charleroi (today UCLouvain Charleroi). However, in December 2010 negotiations for a full merger were aborted by an insufficient vote by the general assembly of Facultés Universitaires Notre-Dame de la Paix (FUNDP).

The "Academie Louvain" ceased to exist in 2014 due to the entry in force of the new law organising the universities.

== Education ==
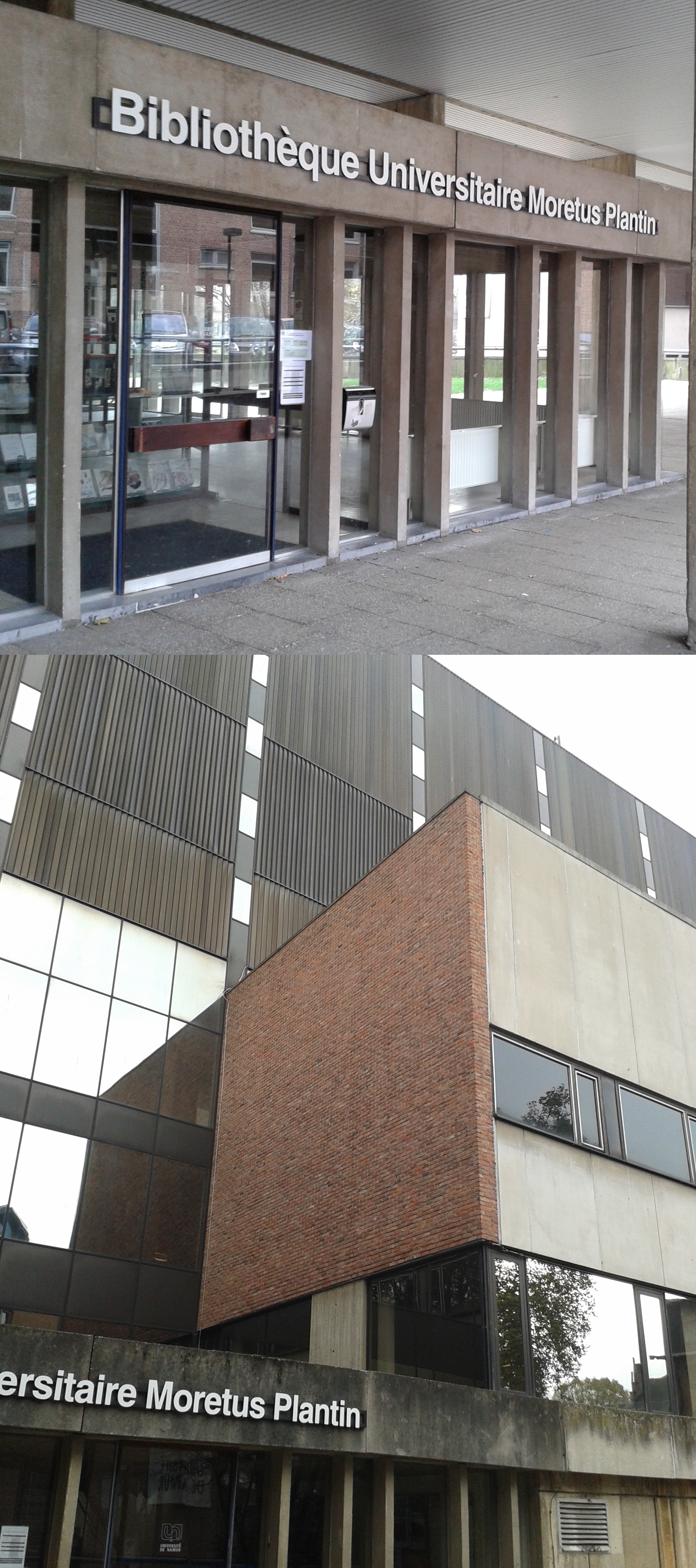
Bump bibliothèque universitaire moretus plantin namur universite

=== Faculty of Philosophy and Letters ===
==== Bachelors degree (Three years) ====
- Philosophy
- History
- Art History and Archeology
- French and Romance Languages and Literatures
- Germanic Languages and Literatures

==== Doctoral studies ====
- Philosophy
- History, Art History and Archaeology
- Languages and Literatures (Romance, Germanic and Greek classics)

=== Faculty of Law ===
==== Bachelor degree (Three years) ====
- Law

==== Doctoral studies ====
- Legal Sciences

=== Faculty of Medicine ===
==== Bachelor degree (Three Years) ====
- Medicine
- Biomedical Sciences
- Pharmacy

==== Master degree (Two Years) ====
- Biomedical Sciences

=== Faculty of Economics, Social Sciences and Management ===
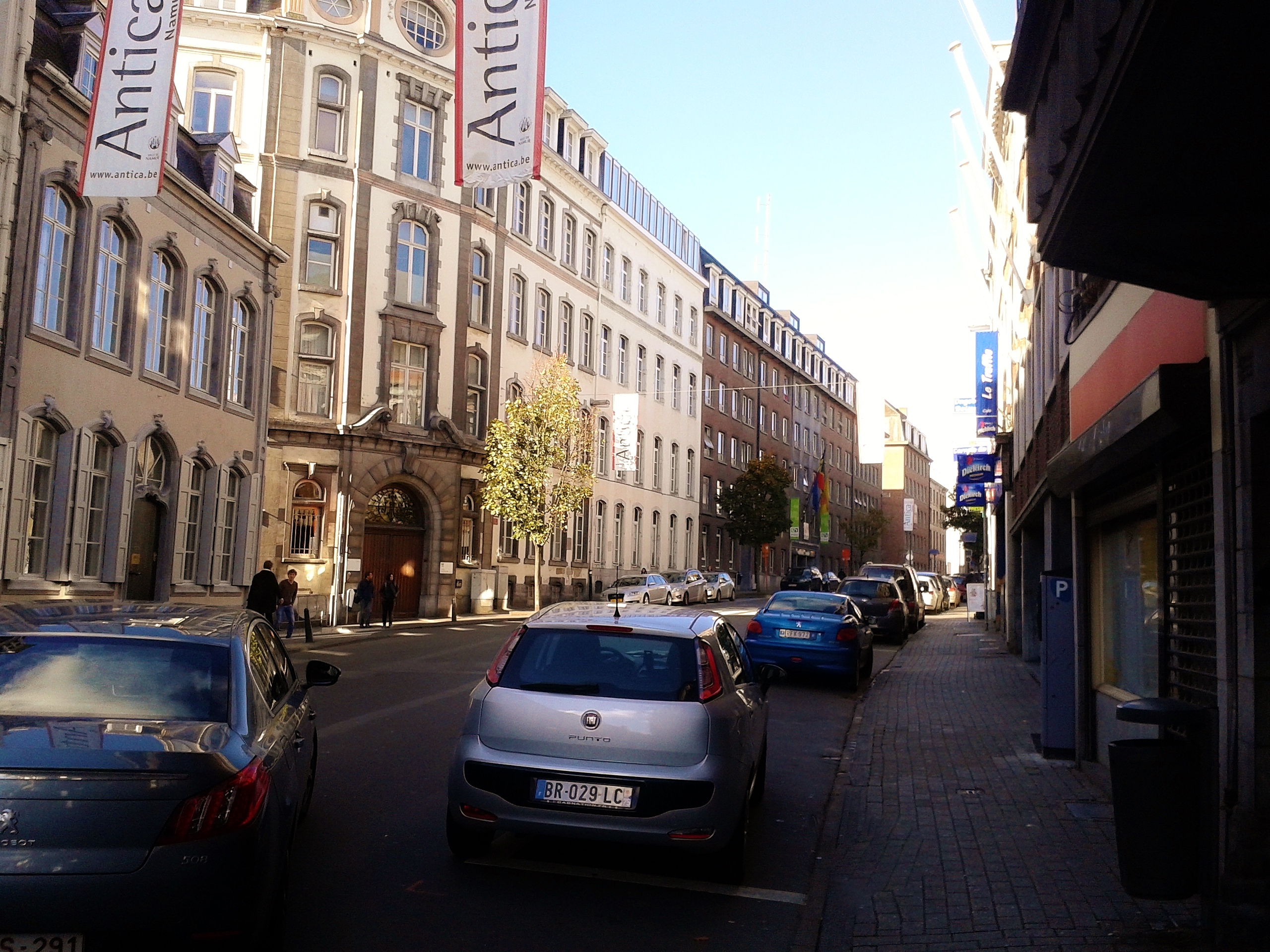

==== Bachelor degree (Three years) ====
- Economics and Management
- Business Engineering
- Political Science
- Information and Communication

==== Master degree (Two years) ====
- Economics
- Management
- Business Engineering
- Business Engineering, with focus on "Information systems management"
- Business Engineering, with focus on "Data Science"

==== Doctoral studies ====
- Economics
- Finance & Markets
- Accounting and Control
- Marketing
- Business Law and Tax Management
- Management (Business Administration & Entrepreneurship-Intrapreneurship / Strategic Management & Corporate Governance / Human Resource Management)
- Management Science (Operation Research / Supply Chain Management)
- Information Systems Management (Business IT)
- Political Science & International Relations
- Social Sciences
- Information and Communication

=== Faculty of Computer Science ===
==== Bachelor degree (Three years) ====
- Computer Science

==== Master degree (Two years) ====
- Computer Science, with a specialization in Software Engineering
- Computer Science, with a specialization in Data science

==== Master degree (One year) ====
- Computer Science

==== Specialization master degree (One year) ====
- Informatics and innovation (business analysis and IT governance)

==== Doctoral studies ====
- Computer Science

=== Faculty of Sciences ===
==== Bachelor degree (Three years) ====
- Mathematics
- Physics
- Chemistry
- Biology
- Geology
- Geography
- Veterinary Medicine

==== Master degree ====
- Mathematics
- Mathematics, with focus on "Data Science"
- Physics
- Chemistry
- Biochemistry and molecular and cell biology
- Biology of organisms and ecology

==== Advanced master in ====
- Aquaculture (organized with the Université de Liège)
- Transportation Management (organized mainly with the Université Libre de Bruxelles)

==== Doctoral studies ====
- Science
- Veterinary Sciences

== Rankings ==
University rankings

Global – Overall
- CWUR World: 1367 (2022–23)
- THE World: 801–1000 (2023)
- USNWR Global: =1494 (2022)

The university is included in some major world university rankings: the U.S. News & World Report Best Global University Ranking of 2021 lists University of Namur as 1436th in the world, and the Center for World University Rankings of 2020-2021 lists the university as 1201st in the world.

== Notable alumni ==
- André Antoine, Belgian politician and French Community of Belgium Minister for finance
- Mathias Cormann, politician and Australia's Minister for finance
- Jean-Luc Dehaene, Prime Minister
- Catherine Fonck, Belgian politician and former French Community of Belgium Health Minister
- Georges Jacobs, businessman, Chairman of the Board of Directors of UCB Group and Chairman of the Board of Directors of Delhaize Group, Honorary Chairman of UNICE
- Oly Ilunga Kalenga, Minister of Health in the Democratic Republic of the Congo.
- Koen Lenaerts, Professor of Law and Judge at the European Court of Justice
- Philippe Maystadt, former Belgian minister and 2000-2011 President of the European Investment Bank
- Petra Rudolf, solid-state physicist and Past-President of the European Physical Society
- Jean-François van Boxmeer, CEO of Heineken International
- Andries Van den Abeele, historian, historical preservationist, politician and entrepreneur
- Pascal Van Hentenryck, constraint programming and optimization theorist, director of the United States' National Science Foundation AI Institute for Advances in Optimization
- Jacques van Ypersele de Strihou, literature, private secretary of the King of Belgium

== See also ==
- Académie Louvain
- CeReFiM (Center for Research in Finance and Management)
- Crealys Science Park
- Education in Belgium
- List of Jesuit sites
- List of universities in Belgium
- PReCISE (Research Center in Information Systems Engineering)
- Tocqueville Chair in Security Policies
- Science and technology in Wallonia
- Science Parks of Wallonia
