= Jules Wieme =

Belgian agriculturalist

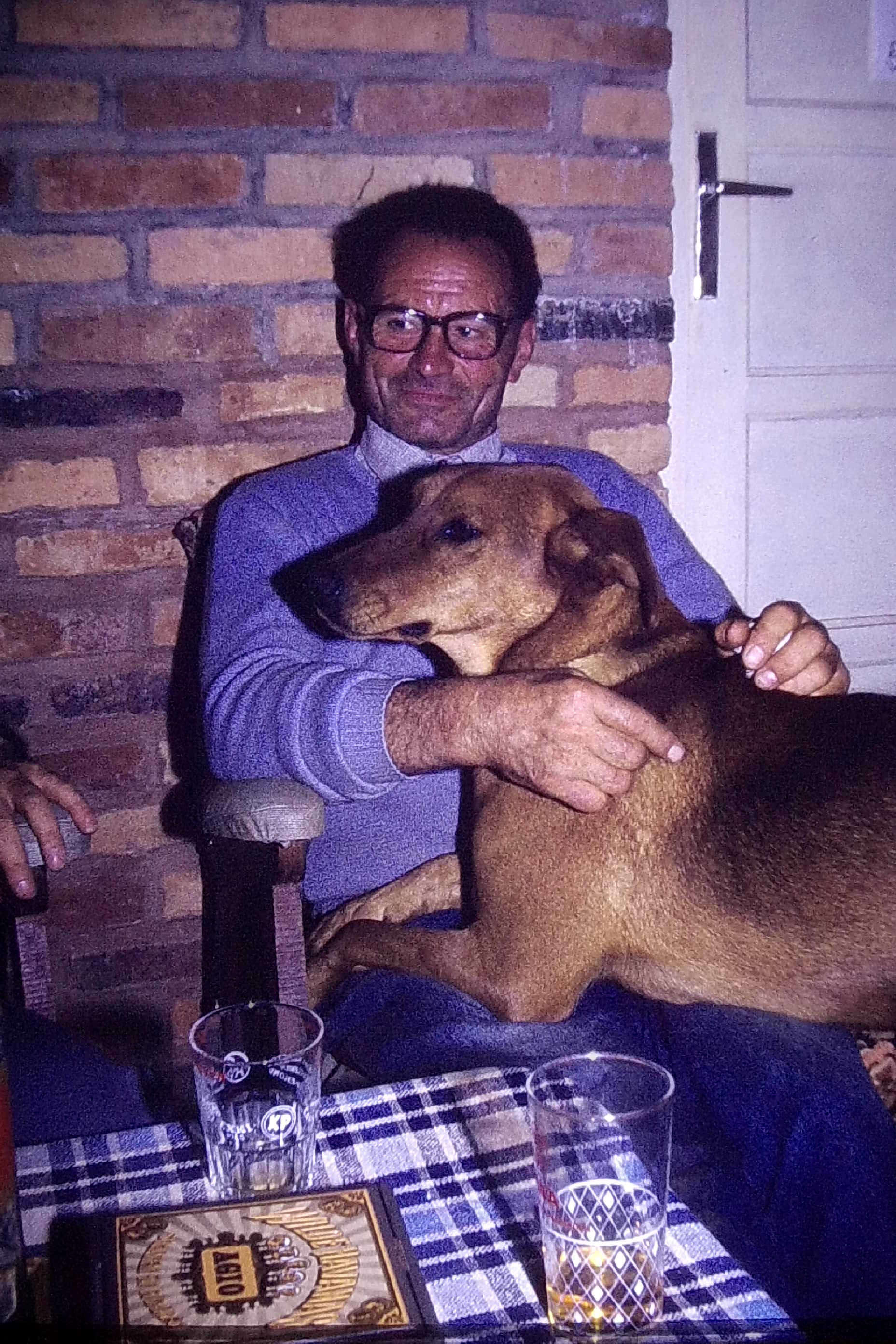
Brother Cyriel Wieme in Kisaro July 1981

Jules Julien François Wieme (24 August 1922 – 13 January 2015) — better known as Cyriel Wieme or Brother Cyriel, was member of De La Salle Brothers who developed agriculture in northern Rwanda over a period of 42 years.

== Early childhood ==
His family with 12 children moved in 1932 to Leupegem where he grew up on a spacious farm near Kerselare. He attended primary school with the Visitation sisters in Edelare and studied Latin-Greek in the secondary school of Oudenaarde. He interrupted his studies during the World War II to work on the parental farm to replace his two brothers who had been mobilized.

== Career ==
His brothers were demobilized and Wieme became a novice with the Brothers of the Christian Schools in Groot-Bijgaarden on 7 September 1941. He was transferred to Bokrijk on 10 January 1946 where he taught for four years at the first year of secondary school. Later on he was in charge of the monastery farm and he also became caretaker and superior of the monastery.

In 1971 the Unesco decided, in collaboration with the Rwanda Ministry of Education, to establish Cerar's (Centre d'Education Rurale et Artisanale du Rwanda): a form of education for boys who have completed six years of primary education but cannot be admitted to secondary school. In December 1971 he visited Rwanda. He paid a lot of attention to the life of the farmers, their methods and the (low) yields. Impressed by their poverty, and at the same time affected by the richness of the climate and the great potential of the labour force, he studied the local curricula. He noted with regret that very little time was provided for practice at the school. His view was that education that spends too much time on theoretical education provides too much classical training and is people who flee from agriculture. On 4 September 1972 he left permanently for Rwanda where he taught in Byumba until 1975. On the hill of Kisaro he founded an agricultural school, where he immediately applied terrace agriculture, as a means to combat land erosion and to obtain more agricultural land in the densely populated and hilly north of Rwanda. The young people were persuaded to build the first terraces on the best soil. The first yield of potatoes was so convincing that the boys claimed that they had never seen such tubers. The barley, wheat and sorghum also did well. Wieme now had gained the trust of the locals for good. Although he sometimes faced opposition from the government and his superiors, he continued to work stubbornly.

Young farmers were encouraged to build their own houses with a cistern, an agricultural terrace with potatoes, grain and vegetables and a pig for self-sufficiency after their education. The mild sunny and rainy climate in the tropical mountains made it possible to have two harvests a year.

Wieme gave seminars on erosion and what can be done about it at the universities of Butare and Ruhengeri. He founded the Centre de Perfectionnement Agricole (CPA, in English "Center for Agricultural Improvement"), which in 1999 became the CPPA (Centre de Perfectionnement et de Promotion Agricole, in English "Center for Agricultural Improvement and Promotion"). He maintained good contacts with the authorities in Rwanda, Belgium, France, Canada and Germany in order to seek support for his project. His agricultural methods were eventually noticed nationally and internationally and promoted by the Ministry of Agriculture all over Rwanda.

In addition to growing and marketing agricultural products, he was able to use the proceeds to provide nursery and primary education and to work in a social environment with a small dispensary. He also taught iron and woodworking and built barns, stables, a butcher's shop, a bakery and a mill, all in support of the local population.

Starting in 1991 Wieme tried to support refugee camps near Kisaro together with the Red Cross and several other monasteries. He was appointed deputy mayor. At the outbreak of the Rwandan genocide on 6 April 1994, he twice had to temporarily return to Belgium. From 1995 onwards, he rebuilt the agricultural school after the centre was occupied by the insurgents. In 2014, due to a terminal illness, he returned to Belgium where he died in the Ghent University Hospital. A commemorative monument was inaugurated on 14 March 2015 on the Kisaro hill.
