= Philippe Gevaert =

Philippe Gevaert from the Ghent University is known for his research on nasal polyposis, particularly in relation to allergies and asthma. His work has explored the underlying mechanisms of nasal polyps, which are often associated with chronic rhinosinusitis and allergic conditions.

He has contributed to understanding the inflammatory processes involved in nasal polyposis, as well as potential treatments and management strategies.

He was the first to study biological treatments such as anti-il-5 and anti-IgE in chronic rhinosinusitis with nasal polyps.
