= CHU UCLouvain Namur =

- University of Louvain
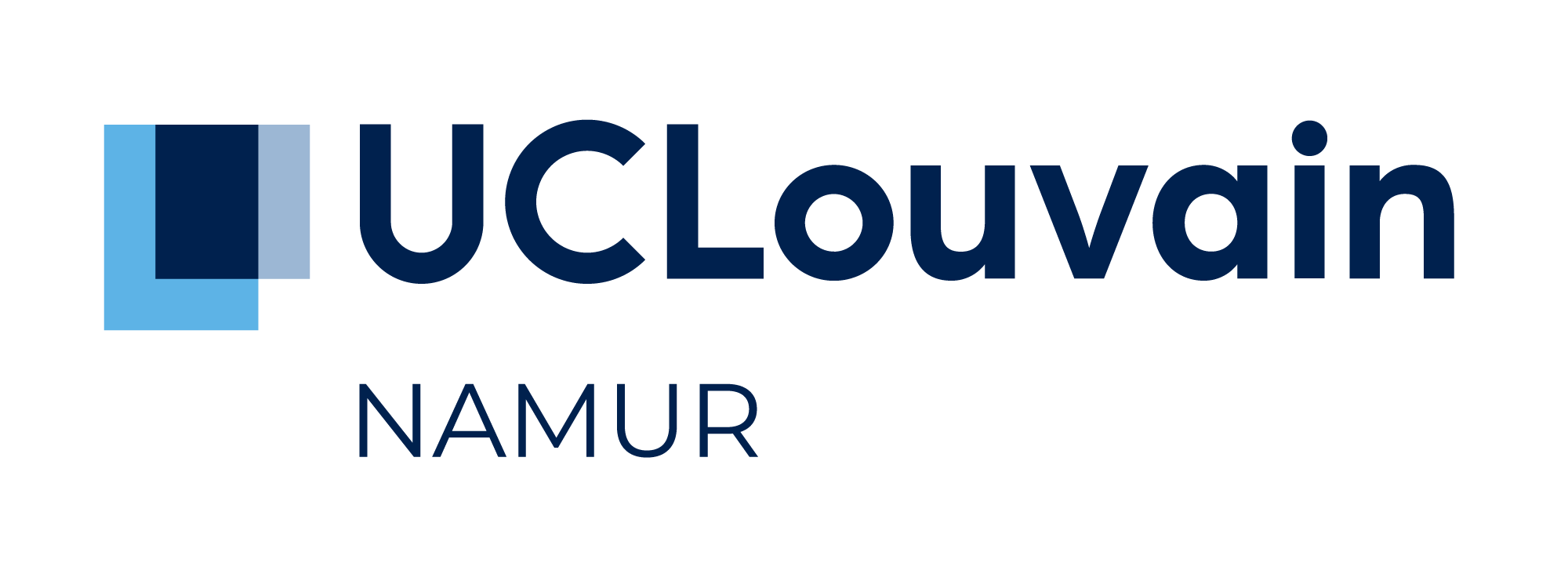

- Sedes Sapientiae, seal of UCLouvain

Geography
- Location: Namur, Belgium
- Coordinates: 50.358129°N 4.882544°E

Organisation
- Care system: Private non-profit (ASBL)
- Type: Teaching
- Affiliated university: UCLouvain
- Network: Réseau Santé Louvain

Services
- Emergency department: Yes
- Beds: 936

Helipads
- Helipad: Yes

History
- Founded: 2015

Links
- Website: http://www.chuuclnamur.be
- Other links: List of hospitals in Belgium

The CHU UCLouvain Namur or CHU UCL Namur (also called UCLouvain Namur by the University of Louvain and officially named Centre hospitalier universitaire Dinant Godinne Saint-Elisabeth - UCL-Namur) is a general hospital with academic beds located in the cities of Namur, Dinant, Yvoir and Ciney, in the Belgian province of Namur. Established in 2015, it is UCLouvain's second hospital.

== Description ==
CHU UCLouvain Namur counts 4.996 employees, making it the largest employer in the Namur province. It is part of the Réseau Santé Louvain network of hospitals.

=== Institutions and locations ===
==== City of Namur ====
- Sainte-Élisabeth site: located on Place Louise Godin in Namur, this vast hospital complex also contains the ECNAS nursing school, and the CMSE, a maternity clinic.
- Foyer Saint-François - Centre de soins palliatifs: located a little to the south of the previous one is a palliative centre, accompanied by the Maison de Naissance de Namur (Arche de Noé, a maternity clinic) and the paramedical department of the Haute École de Namur-Liège-Luxembourg.
- Les Lauriers nursing home

The psychiatric hospital of Beau Vallon, established in Saint-Servais in 1914, is also part of the Saint-Luc - UCLouvain hospital group as well as the UCLouvain Namur site, as a training centre for medical assistants since 1974, and as a research centre in psychiatric medicine.

==== Yvoir ====
- Godinne site
- Crèche Village des Enfants nursery

==== Dinant ====
- Dinant University Hospital (Centre Hospitalier de Dinant)
  - Saint-Vincent site
  - Saint-Anne site; 133-bed nursing home.
- Crèche Les Pommes d'Amour nursery

==== Lustin ====
- Résidence Saint-Thomas de Villeneuve nursing home
- Résidence Alégria nursing home

==== Erpent ====
- Cardiology Center
- Centre for Specialized Medicine
- Les Baseilles Medical Centre

==== Ciney ====
- Sainte-Marie Medical Center

==== Givet, France ====
- Givet Medical Center

== History ==
The Saint-Elisabeth nursing school (today called the ECNAS, École Namuroise de soins Sainte-Élisabeth) was founded by royal decree in 1922, by the Sisters of Charity in the village of Salzinnes, on Charles Zoude street, which still today leads to the Sainte-Élisabeth site. The Foyer Saint-François palliative care centre was founded south of the Sainte-Élisabeth site in 1989.

In 1903, a sanatorium opened in Mont-sur-Meuse (Yvoir), and was bought in 1919 by the National Alliance of Christian Mutual Societies (ANMC). The Mont-Godinne hospital in Yvoir was then founded on 1 January 1928 by the non-profit organization Solidarité Mutualiste Chrétienne, a member of the ANMC. Its headquarters are located at 1031 Brussels (postal code reserved for Christian associations). In 1967, an agreement was signed between Solidarité Mutualiste Chrétienne and the Catholic University of Louvain, still established in Louvain (Leuven). Since then, the hospital has maintained privileged links with the Université catholique de Louvain and its Dutch-speaking equivalent, the Katholieke Universiteit te Leuven. Its 300 beds became university beds in the counting by the Ministry of Public Health. In 2004, the Mont-Godinne hospital changed its name to Cliniques universitaires UCL de Mont-Godinne, in reference to UCLouvain's Saint-Luc University Hospital (Cliniques universitaires Saint-Luc) on the Brussels campus of UCLouvain Bruxelles Woluwe. The hospital changed its name once again to become the Centre Hospitalier Universitaire (CHU) Mont-Godinne in 2011, still jointly managed by UCLouvain and the Christian Mutual Societies.

The Dinant Hospital Centre (Centre hospitalier de Dinant, CHD) was founded on 15 May 1987 as a public hospital of the City of Dinant. Its functioning is initially governed by the municipality's Public Social Action Centre (CPAS). In 2012, the CHU Mont-Godinne in Yvoir merged with the Centre hospitalier de Dinant, forming the CHU UCL Mont-Godinne Dinant (CHU-UCL-MGD).

Mergers are necessary to comply with the "healthcare basin" policy desired by the regional and federal governments.

In 2015, the CHU-UCL-MGD and the Clinique et Maternité Saint-Élisabeth in Namur merged into the Centre hospitalier universitaire Dinant Godinne Saint-Elisabeth - UCL-Namur, a new structure with 5 different hospital facilities. The institution's headquarters is maintained in Mont-Godinne, Yvoir. From that moment, the UCLouvain Namur University Hospital became the largest employer in the province of Namur. The entire CHU UCLouvain Namur is recognized as university hospital and attached to UCLouvain, but only the 300 beds of Mont-Godinne are counted as "university beds".

Since 2017, thanks to a biomass gasification process, the Mont-Godinne site is powered by clean energy from ecological production.

From November 2018 onwards, to face the shortage of doctors in rural areas of northern France, specialists from the Godinne and Dinant sites are also at work in the French municipality of Givet, in the small Givet Medical Center. 15% of the patients at the Dinant site are French.

At the scientific level, the UCLouvain Namur University Hospital is linked with the Faculty of Medicine and Dentistry (MEDE) of the University of Louvain, established on the UCLouvain Brussels Woluwe campus. However, the hospital also maintains relations with the nearby Faculty of Medicine of the University of Namur (UNamur). It de facto serves as a teaching hospital for both universities.

== See also ==
- List of hospitals in Belgium
- Healthcare in Belgium
