= UCLouvain Brussels Woluwe =

Coordinates: 50.8505°N 4.4584°E

- Université catholique de Louvain
- Seal of UCLouvain.
- Former names: Louvain-en-Woluwe
- Motto: Sedes Sapientiae (Latin)
- Motto in English: Seat of Wisdom, Seat of Knowledge
- Type: Free university (state funded)
- Established: 1974 (transfer from Leuven to Brussels)
- Parent institution: University of Louvain
- Affiliations: The Guild; CLUSTER; Coimbra Group
- Rector: Vincent Blondel
- Vice-rector health sciences: Frédéric Houssiau
- Academic staff: 509
- Administrative staff: 1,072
- Students: 7,173
- Location: Woluwe-Saint-Lambert, Belgium
- Campus: Planned community
- Colors: Louvain blue
- Nickname: Wolves
- Mascot: Woulfy
- Website: uclouvain.be/woluwe
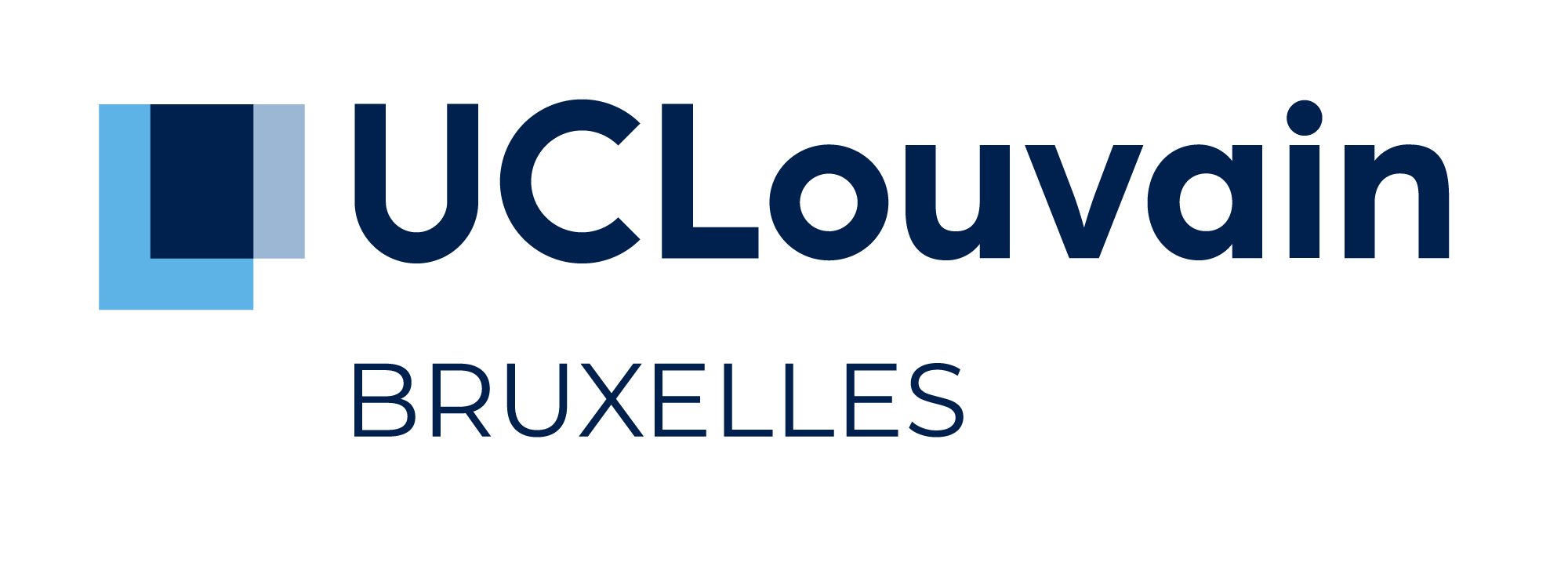
- Data as of 2020

UCLouvain Bruxelles Woluwe, also known as Louvain-en-Woluwe or Alma, is a campus of the University of Louvain in Brussels, Belgium. The campus, built in the 1970s following the Leuven crisis, houses the Faculties of Medicine and Dentistry, Pharmacy and Biomedical Sciences and of Public Health, the Cliniques universitaires Saint-Luc, the university's main academic hospital, as well as many other institutions of higher education and a vast sports complex.

It is one of the three UCLouvain sites in Brussels, with UCLouvain Bruxelles Saint-Gilles and Saint-Louis University, Brussels.

== History ==
Following the split of the Catholic University of Louvain into two legally independent entities in 1968, the majority of the French-speaking university was relocated in Louvain-la-Neuve (Walloon Brabant) since 1972. It was however decided to move the medical school to the eastern suburbs of Brussels, including the construction of a new university hospital complex. In 1968, UCLouvain acquired land in the Brussels municipality of Woluwe-Saint-Lambert and set up its medical faculties, which opened in 1974. In the early 1970s, the university also began construction of the new hospital, the Cliniques universitaires Saint-Luc, which were inaugurated in 1976. The Alma metro station on the city's rapid transit network, located in the centre of the campus, was inaugurated in 1986.

Initially dedicated to education in medical sciences by the university or partner schools, the campus quickly became a multidisciplinary hub by inviting an increasing number of partner institutions, to become Brussels' second largest student campus, with over 14,000 students.

== Description ==
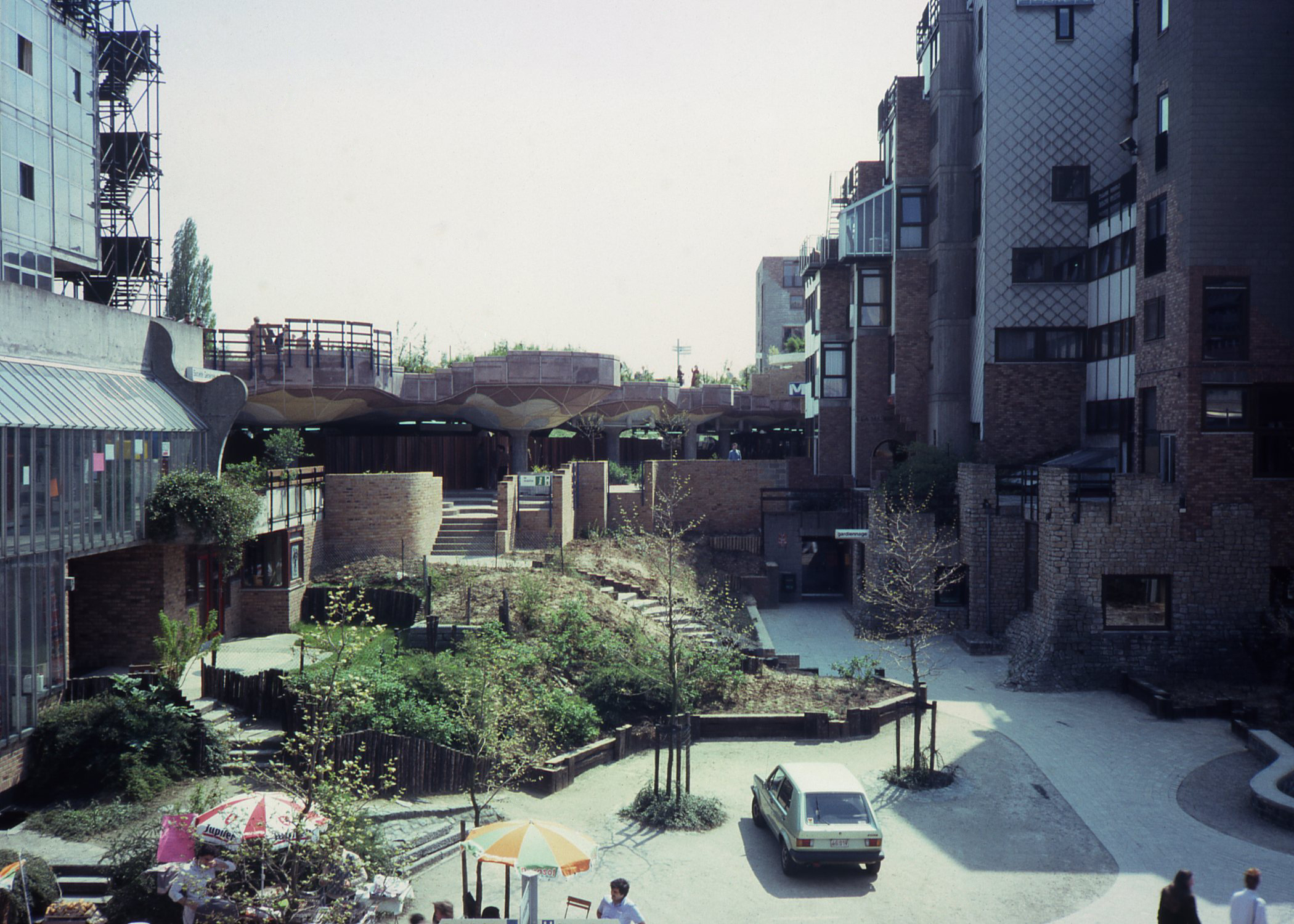
Place de l'Alma in 1982.

Similar to Louvain-la-Neuve, a planned city built in the 1970s, the Woluwe site is built on an urban and neo-pedestrian model. The campus is centered around the Place de l'Alma, the main square built on different levels, whose buildings are now listed as protected monuments. From the very beginning, the Alma square is planned to include the university's administrative services (the "Mairie"), commercial and leisure facilities, particularly in the vast Mémé complex, as well as a metro station, Alma, considered to be a total artwork. The metro station was initially planned under the university hospital. Indeed, a large space in the state of structural work exists under the hospital, hidden from the public.

The centre of Louvain-en-Woluwe is the work of the architect Lucien Kroll. His plan was to build a university town in consultation with the students. This is how the Maison Médicale (the "Mémé") was built on the Place de l'Alma, a vast multi-functional building with student accommodation on the higher floors. The buildings are designed in an ambivalent way with two opposing "wings": for example in the Mémé, Lucien Kroll envisions on one side, a so-called "fascist wing", with identical kots (student rooms) down over a long corridor, and on the other hand a wing with modular spaces, many variations in elevation, width and height within each room and sinuous corridors. Shared kots have also been designed, called granges ("barns").

To the north of Place de l'Alma are the UCLouvain buildings: the hospital at north-west, university spaces to the east. Among the latter, the Auditoires Centraux, the first building of the campus, houses the main teaching locations as well as the Health Sciences Library. Attached to the Central Auditoriums, the André Simonart auditorium, with 900 seats, Brussels second largest, was inaugurated in 2015. Further east are various academic and scientific buildings, mainly research centres including the de Duve Institute and the Belgian branch of Ludwig Cancer Research, followed by the Mounier Sports Complex. Finally, above the Crainhem metro station, the campus is enclosed by its own fire station, PASI UCLouvain, as well as the power station and central heating system.

The eastern part of the campus is made up of a park with a botanical garden of medicinal plants, the Jardin Paul Moens.

Since March 2019, the UCLouvain Brussels Woluwe campus has its own local police office, made up of five police officers from the Montgomery police zone.

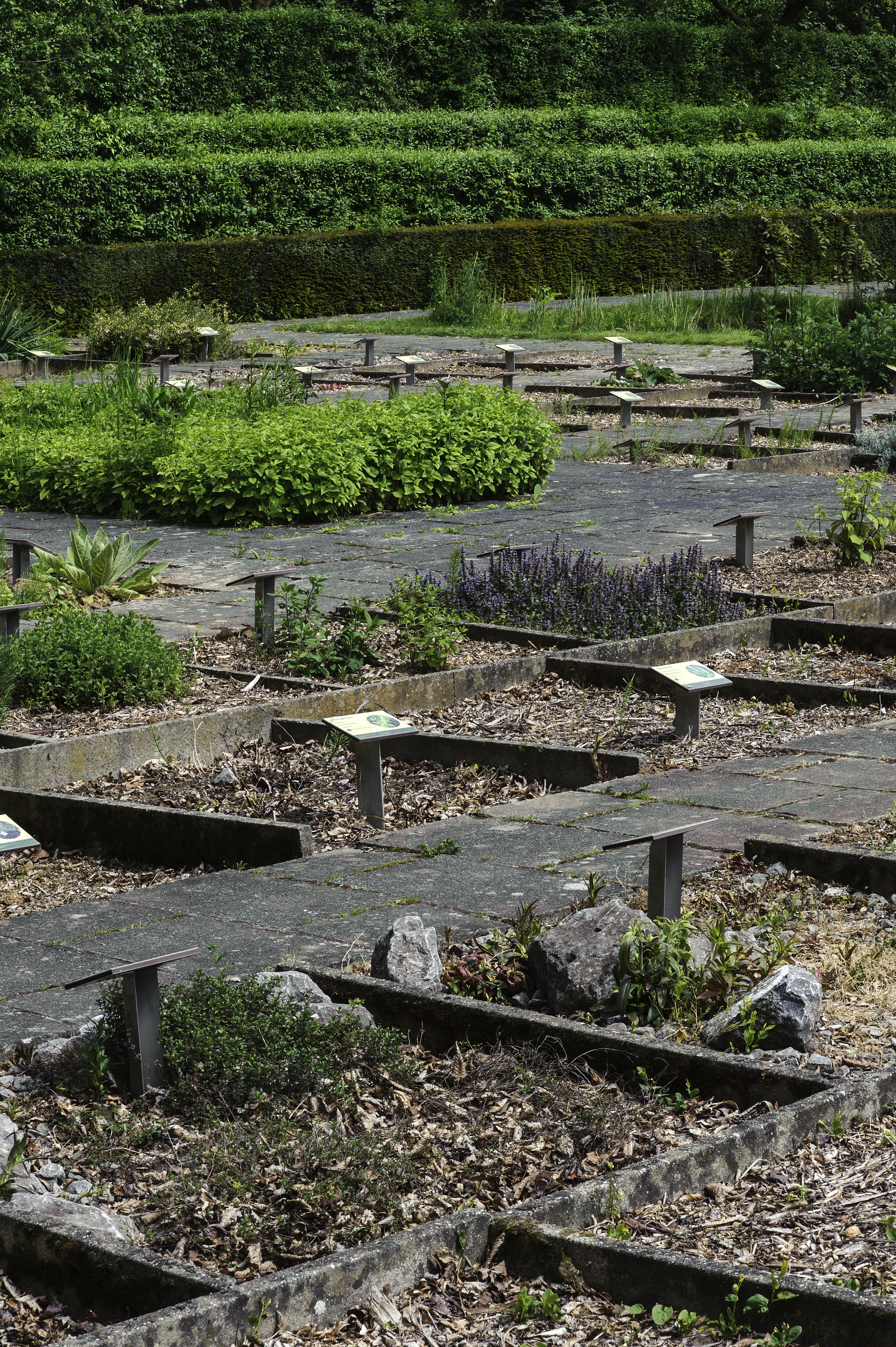
The Jardin des plantes médicinales Paul Moens.

UCLouvain Brussels Woluwe hosts the entire Sector of Health Sciences of UCLouvain, with the exception of the Faculty of Motor Sciences (FSM) which is in Louvain-la-Neuve.

=== Educational institutions ===
- Faculty of Medicine and Dentistry (MEDE) of the University of Louvain, since 1974.
  - UCLouvain Medical School (MED)
  - School of Dentistry and Stomatology (MDEN)
- Faculty of Pharmacy and Biomedical Sciences (FASB) of the University of Louvain, since 1974.
  - School of Pharmacy (FARM)
  - School of Biomedical Sciences (SBIM)
- Faculty of Public Health (FSP) of the University of Louvain, established in 2010.
- École pratique des hautes études commerciales (EPHEC), since 1991.
- Haute école Léonard de Vinci :
  - École centrale des arts et métiers (ECAM Bruxelles), since 2000.
  - Institut Supérieur d’Enseignement Infirmier (Parnasse-ISEI), since 1977.
  - Institut Supérieur Parnasse-Deux Alice (Parnasse-ISEI), since 2013.
  - Institut Paul Lambin (IPL), since 1973.
- American University, Brussels Center for European Studies, since 1994.
- Université des Ainés
- CLL Langues centre
- Chapelle-aux-Champs Primary School

=== Sports facilities ===
- Mounier Sports Complex
- Stone Age - Climbing centre
- Time Break - Mounier Tennis Club
- Mounier Fitness Club

=== Research ===
The campus hosts many private and public research institutions, which can be independent, related to universities, companies, or part of UCLouvain.

Most notably, Brussels Woluwe hosts UCLouvain's de Duve Institute, a multidisciplinary biomedical research institute which also serves as the Belgian branch of Ludwig Cancer Research. Other UCLouvain institutes include the Louvain Drug Research Institute, the Institute of NeuroScience, the Institute of Experimental and Clinical Research or the Institute of Health and Society Research.

The European Organisation for Research and Treatment of Cancer, ILSI Europe, the European Society for Radiotherapy & Oncology, the European Brain Council, the European Association of Neurooncology, the European Oncology Nursing Society, the European Society of Surgical Oncology, Fonds Cancer (FOCA), the International Society for Radiation Oncology, the Belgian Association of Nursing Practitioners and the Society for the Promotion of Life-Cycle Analysis (SPOLD) all have their headquarters in the university's buildings.

Research facilities of FMC BioPolymer and Boehringer Ingelheim are also located on the campus.

=== Companies, foundations and other entities ===
The campus hosts a number of private institutions, lobby groups, technological companies and foundations. Most notably, these include the headquarters of the Ultratop, the Belgian Association of Film Distributors (jointly owned by Twentieth Century Fox Belgium, Belga Films, Kinepolis, The Walt Disney Company, and the Lumière Group), the Belgian Entertainment Association, the Belgian Anti-piracy Federation, AFS Intercultural Programs' AFS Foundation and the SIMIM (Belgian Society of the Music Industry).

The European Liaison Office of the Embassy of the United States of America to Belgium and the European Union is also located in the campus' university district. On Place de l'Alma, the campus also hosts the headquarters of the American Overseas Memorial Day Association Foundation.

Two hotels are furthermore located on the university's grounds.

== Access to the site ==
Two metro stations are located on UCLouvain grounds: Alma and Crainhem.

Various STIB bus lines cross UCLouvain Brussels Woluwe. The hospital is served by the stops UCL Saint-Luc (north) and UCL Cliniques (south), the faculty buildings by the Dunette (north), UCL Auditoires (centre), Mounier and Crainhem (east) stops. The south of the campus is served by the stops Alma and Vandervelde.
