= Eeuwfeestkliniek =

Surgical hospital in Antwerp, Belgium

Coordinates: 51°12′6.85″N 4°24′36.9″E

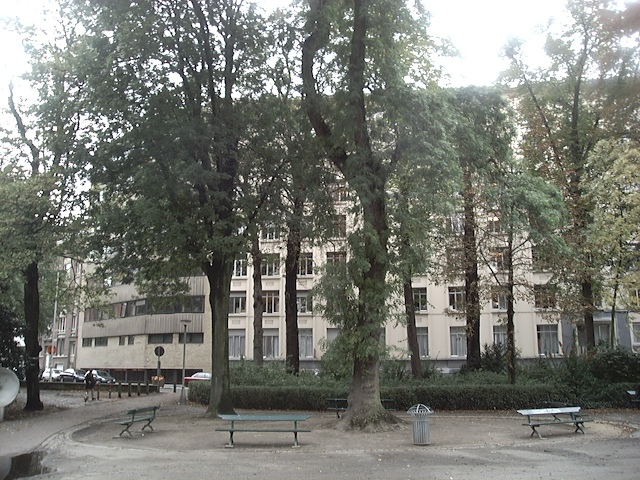
The Eeuwfeestkliniek

The Eeuwfeestkliniek (English: Centenary Clinic) is a former hospital in Antwerp, Belgium, whose former site is now the Antwerp campus of Algemeen Ziekenhuis Monica (AZ Monica). It was established in 1930 and became part of AZ Monica in 1997, following its merger with O.L.V. Middelares.

== History ==
It was designed by Alfried Defever in 1927 and constructed for the city of Antwerp after a building permit was obtained in 1928. Opened in 1930, it was named after the centenary of Belgian independence. After World War II, it was expanded by the Augustinian nuns who had been present at the hospital since 1935. The complex was extensively renovated from the late 1980s onward. Following its merger with O.L.V. Middelares in 1997, it became the Antwerp campus of AZ Monica, while the O.L.V. Middelares became its Deurne campus. The Antwerp campus was further renovated and expanded in 2024.

== See also ==
- List of hospitals in Belgium
- Healthcare in Belgium
