= Sint-Franciscusziekenhuis =

Coordinates: 51.047°N 5.3153°E

The Sint-Franciscusziekenhuis (Dutch/Flemish for Saint Francis hospital) is a hospital located in the municipality of Heusden-Zolder in the province of Limburg, Flanders, Belgium.

== History ==
The Saint-Francis Hospital was founded by the congregation of the Grauwzusters from Zoutleeuw on 20 October 1925 when the head of the Franciscan order in Heusden-Zolder asked for a hospital for the local miners. This is how the hospital got its name.

The construction of the hospital started in 1927 and in that same year, the hospital was able to take care of 30 people. An operating room, a pharmacy and a washhouse were added in 1928. In 1932, a room for radiodiagnosis was added. During World War II, in 1941, the hospital was extended with another hall that could fit 30 patients, as well as a delivery room. A maternity department was added in 1952 and in 1957, an internal medicine department was added. Finally, the hospital was extended with a pediatrics department. After these works, however, renovations and more specialised medical departments were needed in the hospital.

On 19 December 1973, Jos De Saeger (Belgian Minister of Public Health, Family and Environment) agreed on the hospital's proposal of its extension with another 84 beds. However, problems with the bad condition of the building due to mineshaft cave-ins underneath the hospital obstructed these works. On 20 May 1975, Rik Vandekerckhove agreed on new terms to replace the old building with a new one with 224 beds. Because of the Royal Assent (French: sanction royale) of 1 July 1982 that the number of beds could not be higher than 150, a new hospital with this smaller number of beds was built. It first opened on 25 September 1985.

After the fusion with the Saint-Anna Hospital of Beringen (Dutch/Flemish: Sint-Annakliniek) in 1990, the hospital had 230 beds. On 1 October 1993, the hospital opened the first department for day hospitalisation.

In 2005, large parts of the hospital were renovated and restructured. In 2008, the hospital started with the building of new departments and specialized areas, such as a geriatrics department and two new operating rooms, and with the renovation of older parts of the hospital buildings. These works lasted until 2011. On 1 July 2009, the hospital had 244 beds available for all kinds of patients.

=== Failed merger ===
In January 2001, the Saint-Francis Hospital of Heusden-Zolder and the hospitals AZ Salvator-Saint-Ursula with campuses in Hasselt and Herk-de-Stad announced that they had concluded a merger agreement and would henceforth be called the Christian General Hospital Mid-Limburg (Dutch: Christelijk Algemeen Ziekenhuis Midden-Limburg or C.A.Z. Midden-Limburg). According to then chairman Karel Peeters, the C.A.Z. Midden-Limburg would become the second largest hospital in the province of Limburg in 2001. With the merger, the capacity would be over 663 beds, 1,200 employees and 160 physician-specialists. Later, in 2009, the merger with the Saint-Francis Hospital was dissolved.

== Hospital network ==
The Saint-Francis Hospital is part of the hospital network Andreaz, formerly known as the hospital network South-West Limburg (Dutch: Ziekenhuisnetwerk Zuid-West Limburg), together with the Jessa Hospital in Hasselt, the Sint-Trudo Hospital in Sint-Truiden, and the AZ Vesalius in Tongeren. The hospital network covers a population of 530.000 people in the province of Limburg.

== See also ==
- List of hospitals in Belgium
- Healthcare in Belgium
