= List of hospitals in Belgium =

This is a list of hospitals and hospital networks in Belgium as of August 2019, sorted per region and per province. For each hospital or hospital network, the list includes if applicable their specialisation, the municipalities where they are located, any international hospital accreditation they have obtained as well as their number of hospital beds (an indicator of the overall size and importance of the hospital or network). Note that in Dutch a hospital is called ziekenhuis, kliniek or hospitaal, whilst in French a hospital is called hôpital, centre hospitalier or clinique. Some common abbreviations in this list are:

- 'AZ' indicates a general hospital (Dutch: Algemeen Ziekenhuis).
- 'UZ' indicates a university hospital (Dutch: Universitair Ziekenhuis), as does 'CHU' (French: Centre Hospitalier Universitaire).
- 'CHR' indicates a regional hospital, mostly found in larger towns and cities and their metropolitan area (French: Centre Hospitalier Régional), as does 'RZ' (Dutch: Regionaal Ziekenhuis).
- 'PZ' or 'PC' indicates a psychiatric hospital (Dutch: Psychiatrisch Ziekenhuis or Psychiatrisch Centrum), as does 'HP', 'CP' or 'CHP' (French: Hôpital Psychiatrique, Centre Psychiatrique or Centre Hospitalier Psychiatrique).
- 'UPC' indicates a psychiatric hospital associated with a university or a psychiatric division of a university hospital (Dutch: Universitair Psychiatrisch Centrum).

== Flemish Region ==
=== West Flanders ===
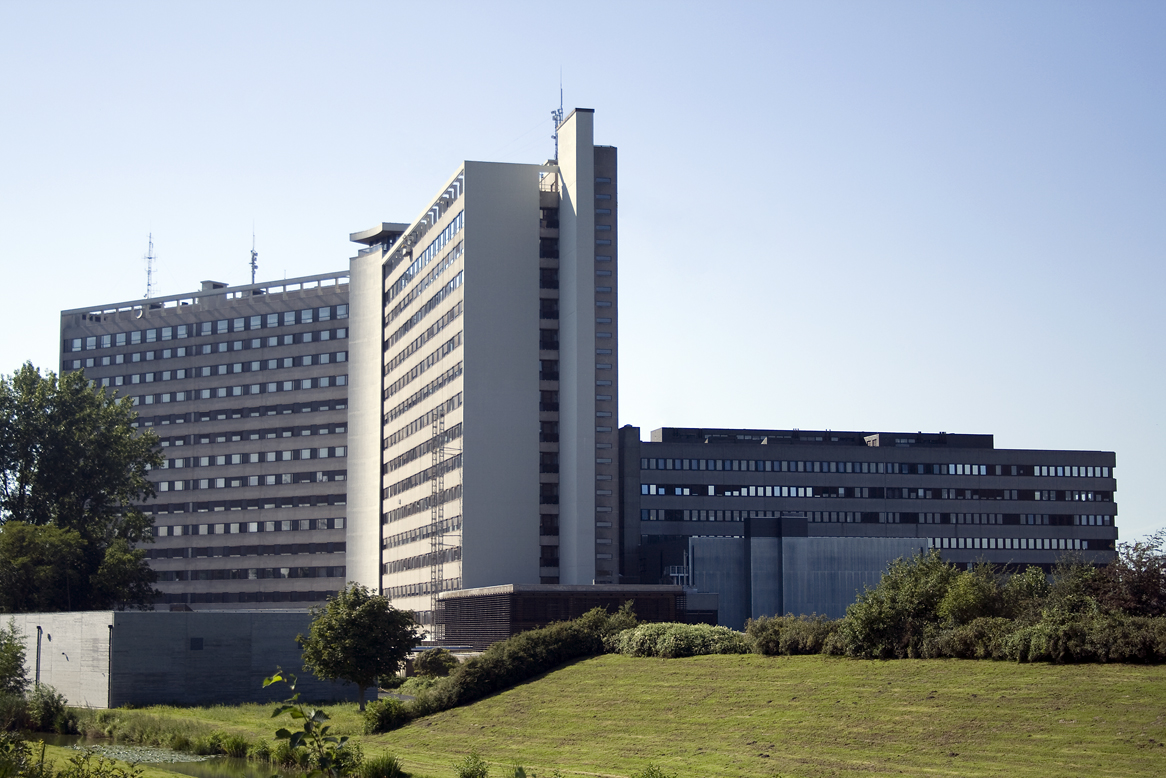
AZ Sint-Jan, Bruges.

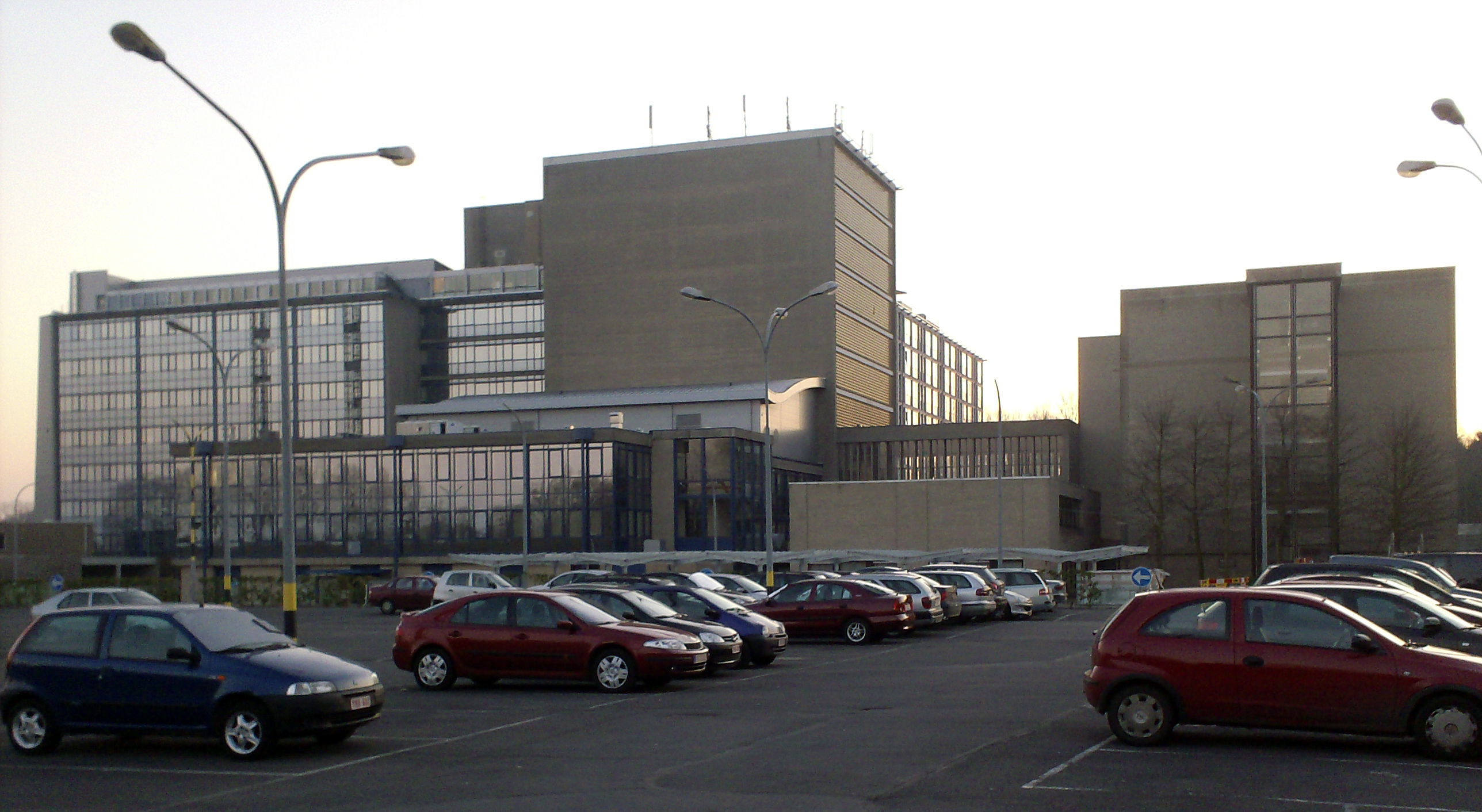
AZ Sint-Lucas, Bruges.

==== General hospitals ====
- Jan Yperman Ziekenhuis
  - Hospital sites located in Ypres, Poperinge and Wervik
  - Has obtained accreditation by the JCI
  - Disposes of 523 beds (all sites)
- AZ Delta
  - Hospital sites located in Roeselare, Menen and Torhout
  - Has obtained accreditation by the JCI
  - Disposes of 1,396 beds (all sites)
- AZ Zeno
  - Hospital sites located in Blankenberge and Knokke-Heist
  - Has obtained accreditation by the NIAZ
  - Disposes of 334 beds (all sites)
- AZ Sint-Jan
  - Hospital sites located in Bruges and Ostend
  - Has obtained accreditation by the JCI
  - Disposes of 1,182 beds (all sites)
- AZ Sint-Lucas
  - Located in Bruges
  - Has obtained accreditation by the NIAZ
  - Disposes of 419 beds
- AZ Damiaan
  - Located in Ostend
  - Has obtained accreditation by the JCI
  - Disposes of 523 beds
- Sint-Jozefskliniek
  - Located in Izegem
  - Has obtained accreditation by the JCI
  - Disposes of 271 beds
- AZ West
  - Located in Veurne
  - Has obtained accreditation by the JCI
  - Disposes of 224 beds
- Sint-Andriesziekenhuis
  - Located in Tielt
  - Has obtained accreditation by the JCI
  - Disposes of 266 beds
- AZ Groeninge
  - Located in Kortrijk
  - Has obtained accreditation by the JCI
  - Disposes of 1,054 beds
- O.L.V. van Lourdesziekenhuis
  - Located in Waregem
  - Has obtained accreditation by the NIAZ
  - Disposes of 267 beds

==== Specialised hospitals ====
- Koningin Elisabeth Instituut
  - Rehabilitation hospital
  - Located in Koksijde
  - Has not obtained hospital-wide accreditation
  - Disposes of 165 beds
- Revalidatiecentrum IMBO
  - Rehabilitation hospital
  - Located in Ostend
  - Has not obtained hospital-wide accreditation
  - Disposes of 125 beds
- PZ Onzelievevrouw
  - Psychiatric hospital
  - Located in Bruges
  - Has obtained accreditation by the NIAZ
  - Disposes of 412 beds
- PTC Rustenburg
  - Psychiatric hospital
  - Located in Bruges
  - Has not obtained hospital-wide accreditation
  - Disposes of 72 beds
- PC Sint-Amandus
  - Psychiatric hospital
  - Located in Beernem
  - Has obtained accreditation by the NIAZ
  - Disposes of 459 beds
- Kliniek Sint-Jozef
  - Psychiatric hospital
  - Located in Pittem
  - Has not obtained hospital-wide accreditation
  - Disposes of 197 beds
- PZ Heilige Familie
  - Psychiatric hospital
  - Located in Kortrijk
  - Has obtained accreditation by the NIAZ
  - Disposes of 120 beds
- PZ Heilig Hart
  - Psychiatric hospital
  - Located in Ypres
  - Has not obtained hospital-wide accreditation
  - Disposes of 347 beds
- PC Menen
  - Psychiatric hospital
  - Located in Menen
  - Has not obtained hospital-wide accreditation
  - Disposes of 233 beds

=== East Flanders ===
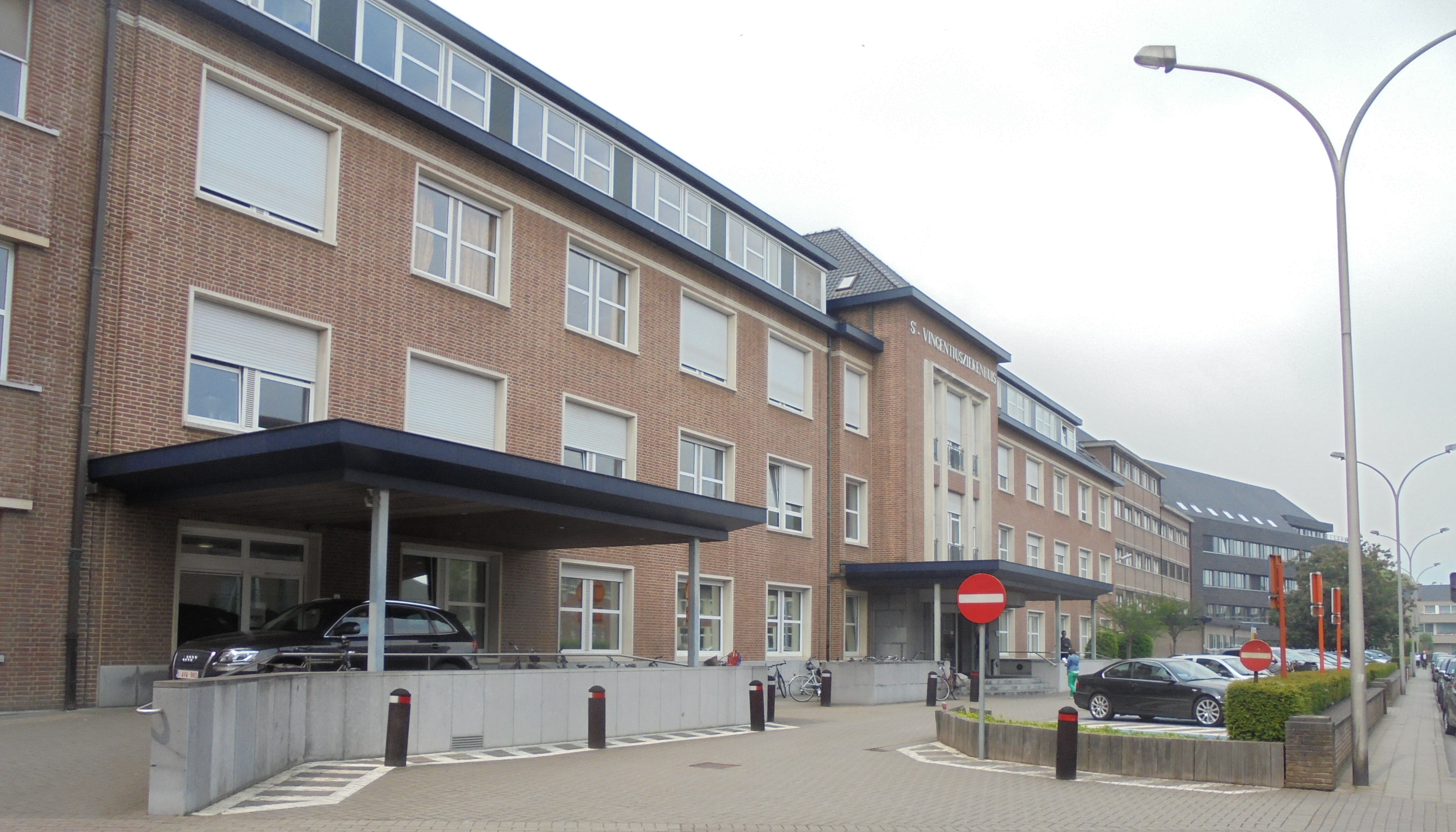
Sint-Vincentiusziekenhuis, Deinze.

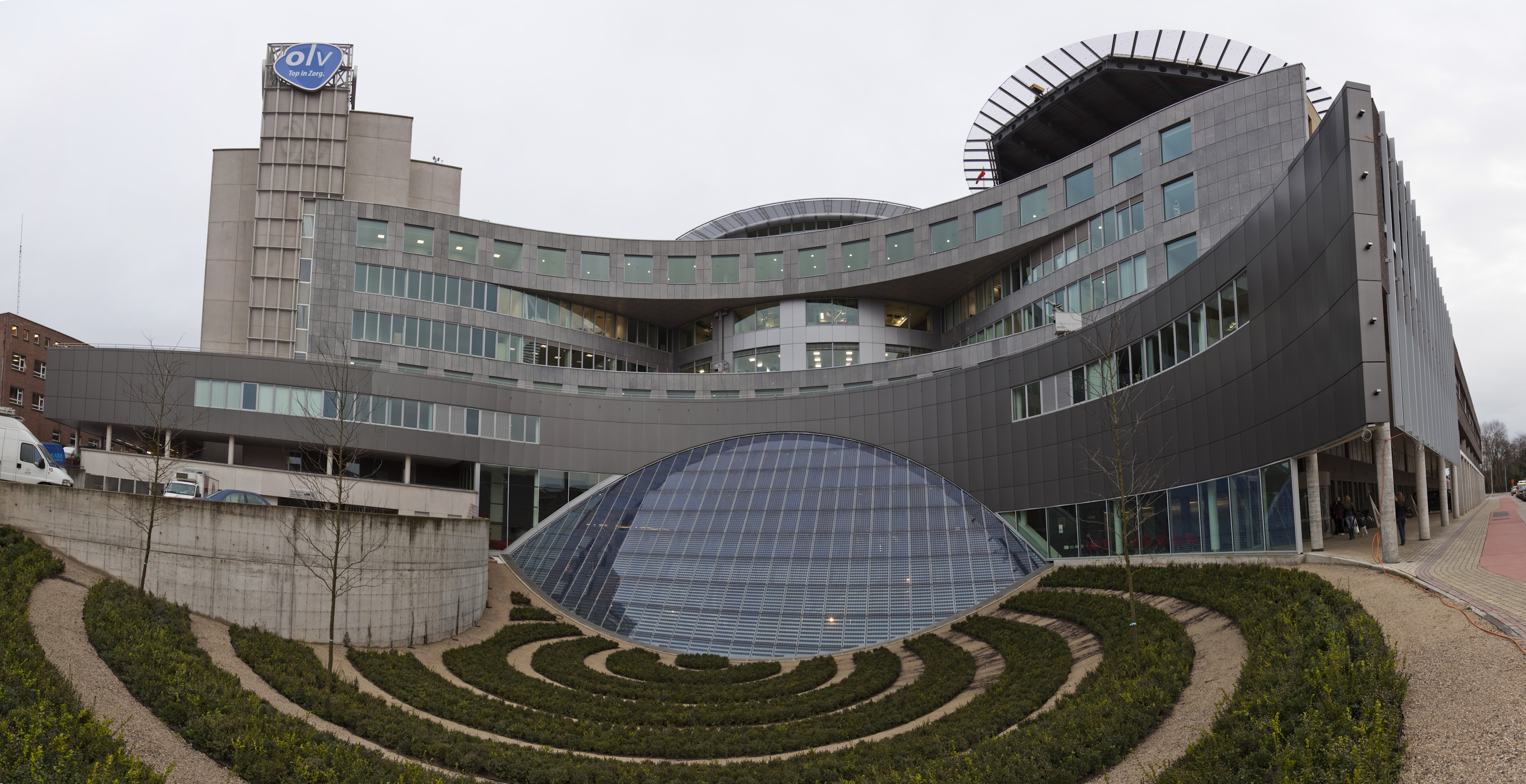
Onze-Lieve-Vrouwziekenhuis, Aalst.

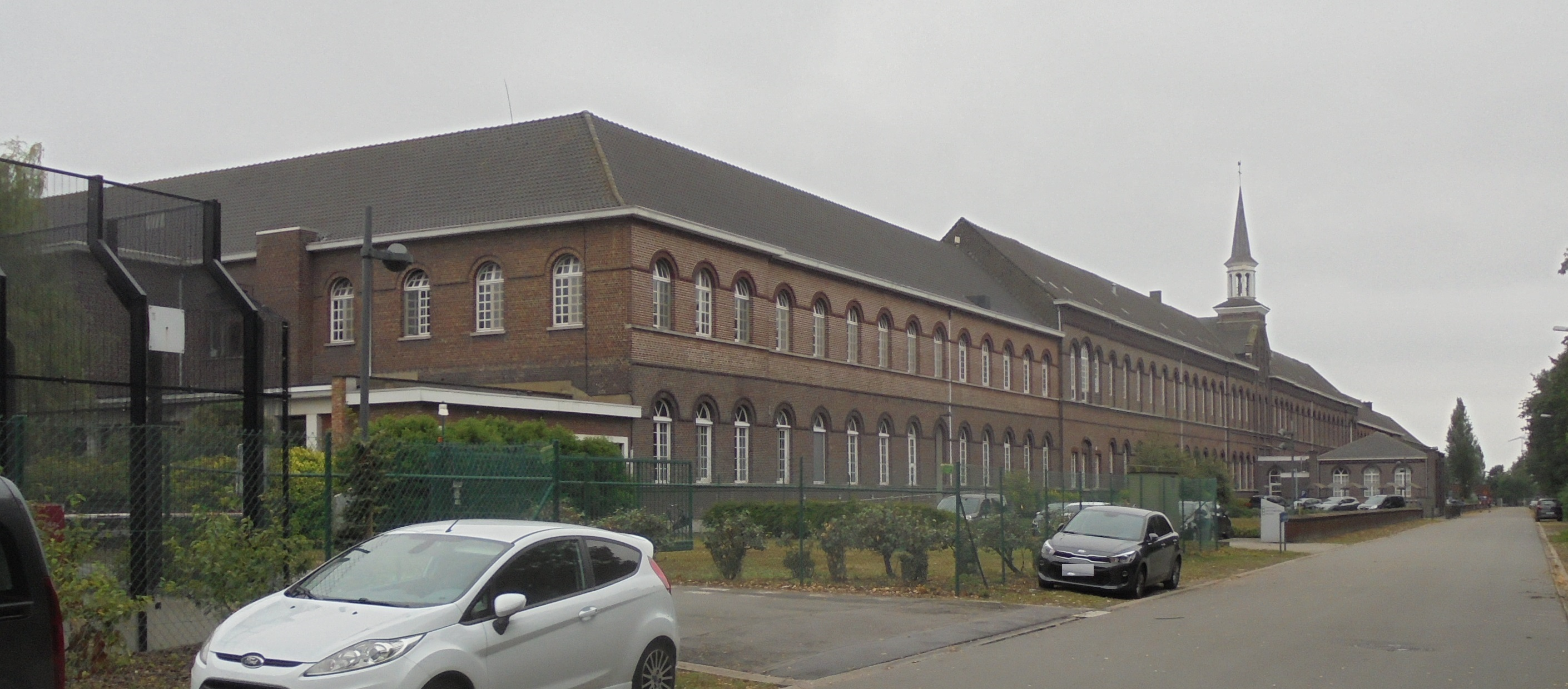
PC Sint-Jan Baptist, Zelzate.

==== General hospitals ====
- AZ Sint-Blasius
  - Hospital sites located in Dendermonde and Zele
  - Has obtained accreditation by the JCI
  - Disposes of 438 beds (all sites)
- Onze-Lieve-Vrouwziekenhuis
  - Hospital sites located in Aalst, Ninove and Flemish Brabant
  - Has obtained accreditation by the JCI
  - Disposes of 844 beds (all sites)
- Algemeen Stedelijk Ziekenhuis
  - Hospital sites located in Aalst, Geraardsbergen and Wetteren
  - Has obtained accreditation by the NIAZ
  - Disposes of 568 beds (all sites)
- AZ Oudenaarde
  - Located in Oudenaarde
  - Has obtained accreditation by the NIAZ
  - Disposes of 235 beds
- AZ Alma
  - Located in Eeklo
  - Has obtained accreditation by the NIAZ
  - Disposes of 442 beds
- Sint-Vincentiusziekenhuis
  - Located in Deinze
  - Has obtained accreditation by the NIAZ
  - Disposes of 170 beds
- AZ Sint-Elisabeth
  - Located in Zottegem
  - Has obtained accreditation by the NIAZ
  - Disposes of 333 beds
- AZ Lokeren
  - Located in Lokeren
  - Has obtained accreditation by the NIAZ
  - Disposes of 170 beds
- AZ Glorieux
  - Located in Ronse
  - Has obtained accreditation by the JCI
  - Disposes of 340 beds
- AZ Nikolaas
  - Hospital sites located in Sint-Niklaas, Temse and Beveren
  - Has obtained accreditation by the NIAZ
  - Disposes of 810 beds (all sites)
- AZ Jan Palfijn
  - Located in Ghent
  - Has obtained accreditation by the NIAZ
  - Disposes of 526 beds
- AZ Maria Middelares
  - Located in Ghent
  - Has obtained accreditation by the JCI
  - Disposes of 542 beds
- AZ Sint-Lucas
  - Hospital sites located in Ghent
  - Has obtained accreditation by the NIAZ
  - Disposes of 779 beds (all sites)
- UZ Gent (associated with Ghent University)
  - Located in Ghent
  - Has obtained accreditation by the NIAZ
  - Disposes of 1,049 beds

==== Specialised hospitals ====
- PC Dr. Guislain
  - Psychiatric hospital
  - Hospital sites located in Ghent
  - Has obtained accreditation by the NIAZ
  - Disposes of 311 beds (all sites)
- PC Gent-Sleidinge
  - Psychiatric hospital
  - Hospital sites located in Ghent and Evergem
  - Has not obtained hospital-wide accreditation
  - Disposes of 320 beds (all sites)
- Karus
  - Psychiatric hospital
  - Hospital sites located in Ghent and Melle
  - Has not obtained hospital-wide accreditation
  - Disposes of 472 beds (all sites)
- PC Sint-Jan
  - Psychiatric hospital
  - Located in Eeklo
  - Has not obtained hospital-wide accreditation
  - Disposes of 201 beds
- PC Sint-Jan Baptist
  - Psychiatric hospital
  - Located in Zelzate
  - Has obtained accreditation by the NIAZ
  - Disposes of 219 beds
- PC Sint-Hiëronymus
  - Psychiatric hospital
  - Located in Sint-Niklaas
  - Has not obtained hospital-wide accreditation
  - Disposes of 220 beds
- APZ Sint-Lucia
  - Psychiatric hospital
  - Hospital sites located in Beveren and Sint-Niklaas
  - Has not obtained hospital-wide accreditation
  - Disposes of 288 beds
- PC Sint-Franciscus - De Pelgrim
  - Psychiatric hospital
  - Hospital sites located in Oosterzele and Zottegem
  - Has not obtained hospital-wide accreditation
  - Disposes of 223 beds
- PC Ariadne
  - Psychiatric hospital
  - Located in Lede
  - Has obtained accreditation by the NIAZ
  - Disposes of 185 beds

=== Antwerp ===
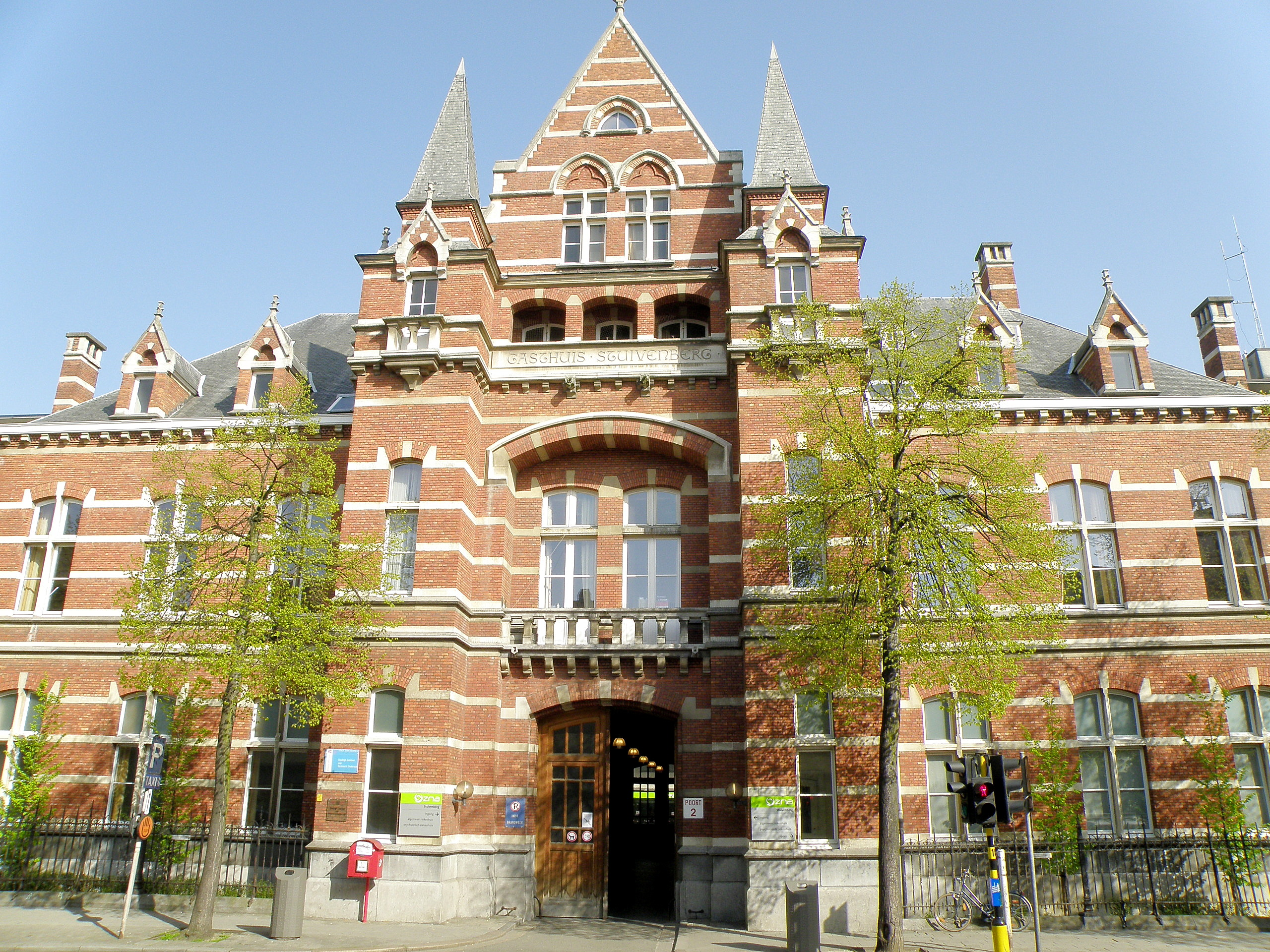
ZNA Stuivenberg, Antwerp.

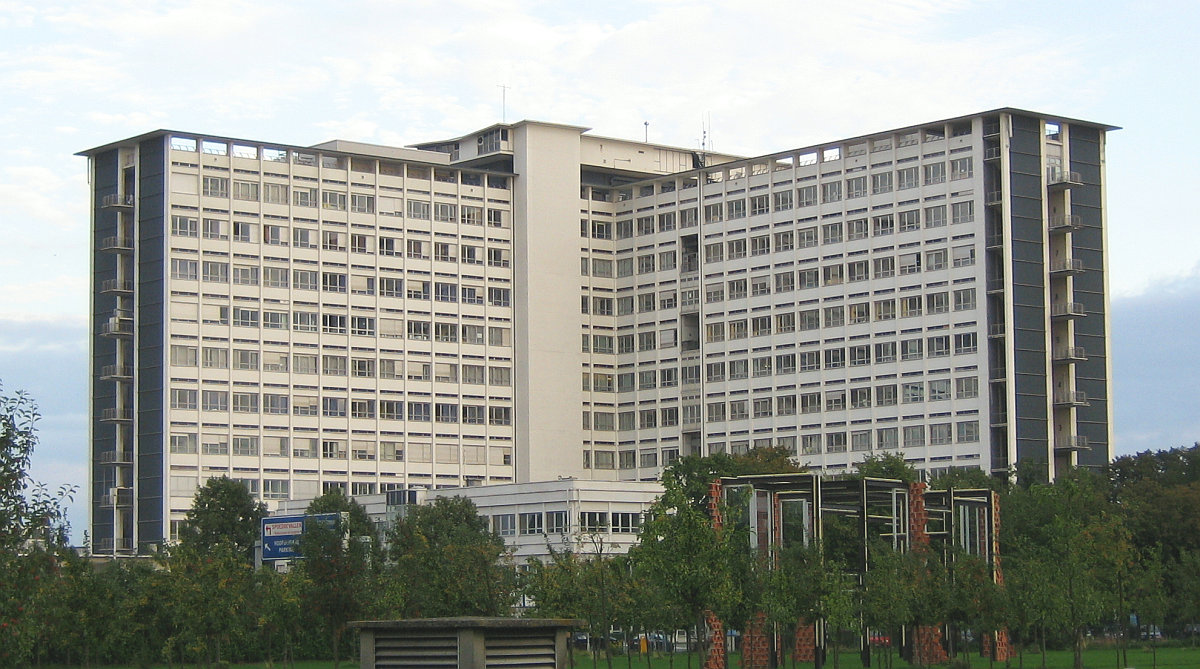
ZNA Middelheim, Antwerp.

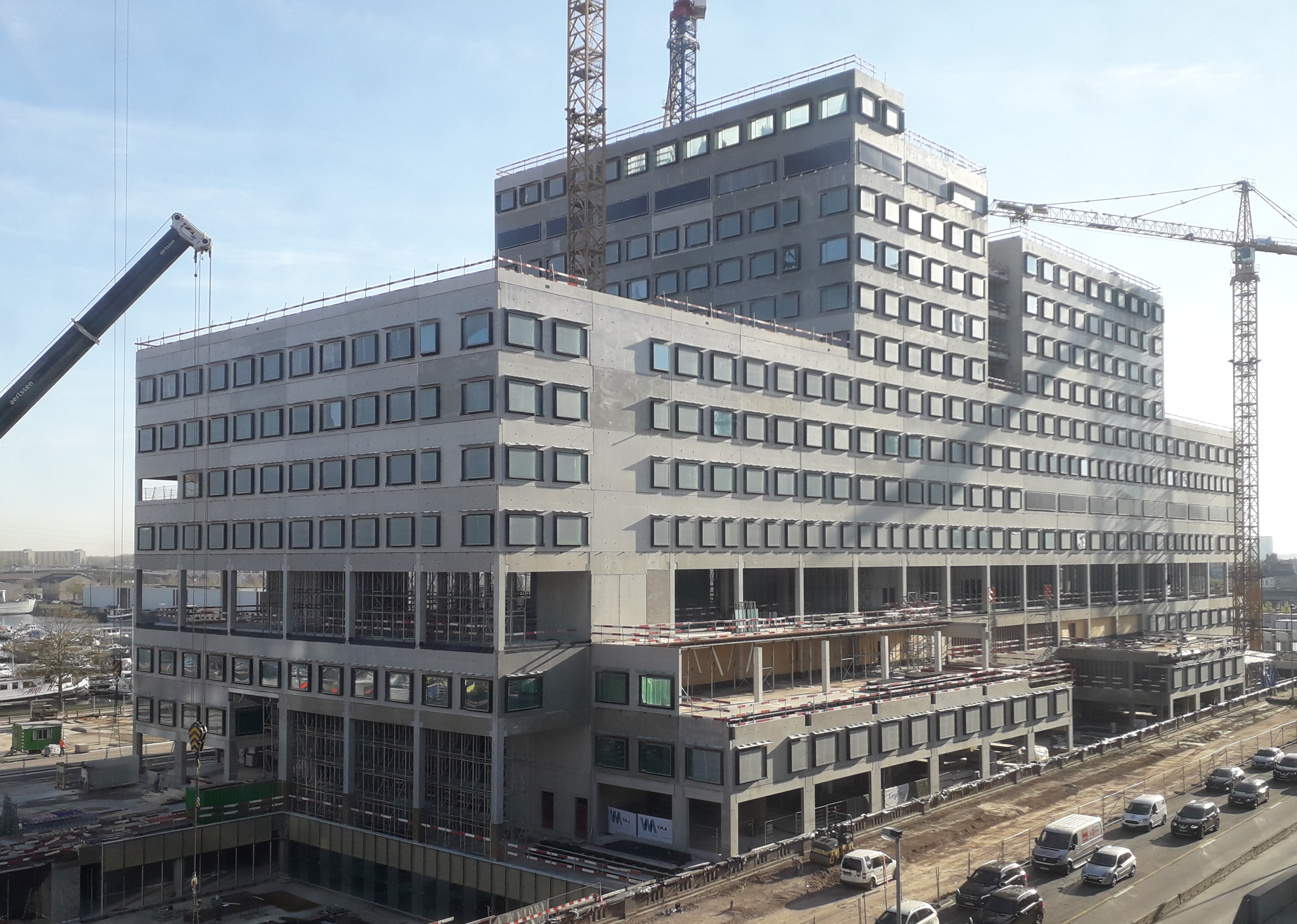
ZNA Cadix, Antwerp. Under construction as of 2019.

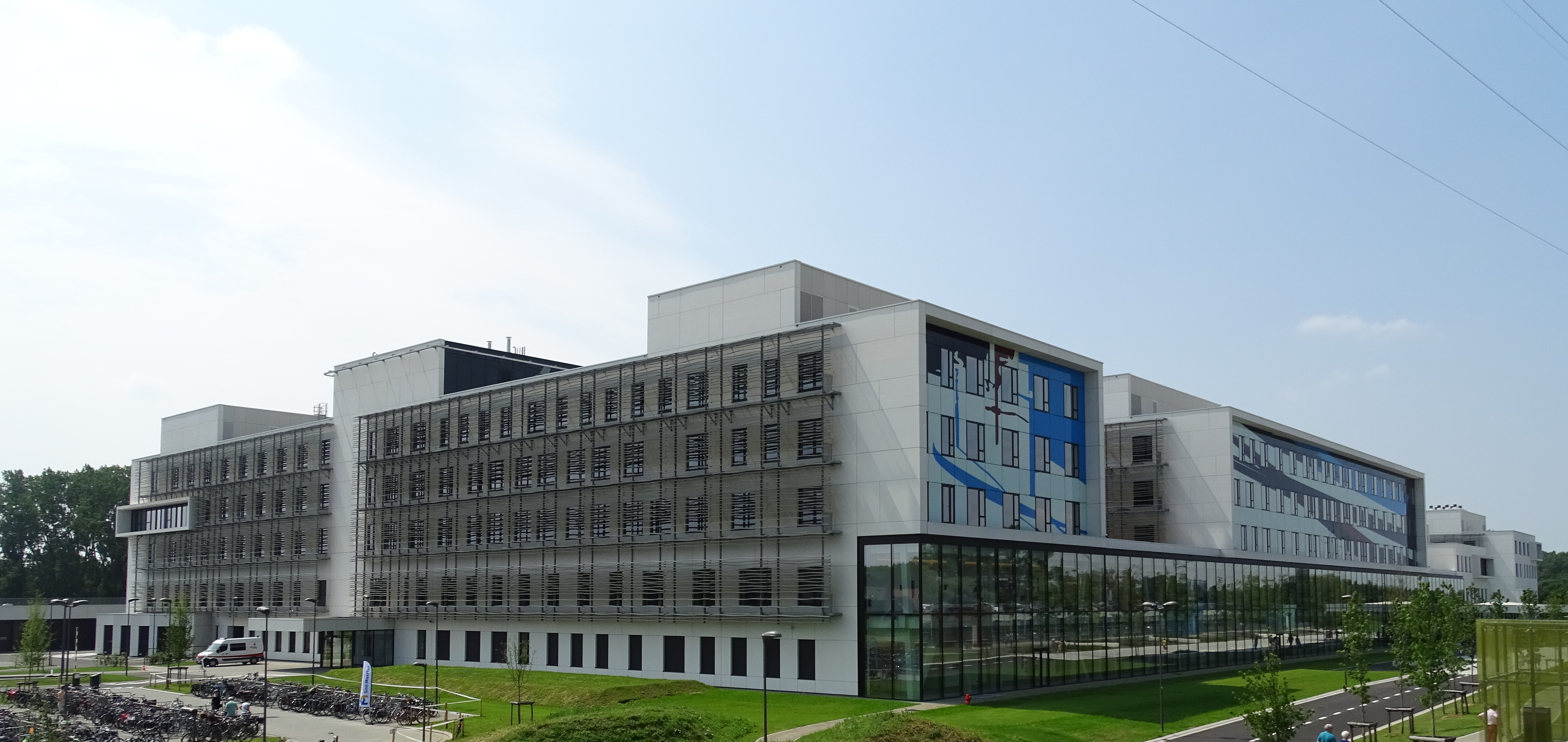
AZ Sint-Maarten, Mechelen.

==== General hospitals ====
- Ziekenhuis Netwerk Antwerpen
  - Hospital sites located in Antwerp and Zoersel
  - Has obtained accreditation by the JCI
  - Disposes of 1,955 beds (all sites)
- Gasthuiszusters Antwerpen
  - Hospital sites located in Antwerp and Mortsel
  - Has obtained accreditation by the JCI
  - Disposes of 1,012 beds (all sites)
- AZ Monica (includes the Eeuwfeestkliniek)
  - Hospital sites located in Antwerp
  - Has obtained accreditation by the JCI
  - Disposes of 466 beds (all sites)
- UZA (associated with the University of Antwerp)
  - Located in Edegem
  - Has obtained accreditation by the JCI
  - Disposes of 573 beds
- AZ Klina
  - Hospital sites located in Brasschaat and Wuustwezel
  - Has obtained accreditation by the JCI
  - Disposes of 581 beds (all sites)
- AZ Rivierenland
  - Hospital sites located in Bornem, Rumst and Willebroek
  - Has obtained accreditation by the NIAZ
  - Disposes of 416 beds (all sites)
- AZ Turnhout
  - Hospital sites located in Turnhout
  - Has obtained accreditation by the NIAZ
  - Disposes of 647 beds (all sites)
- AZ Sint-Dimpna
  - Located in Geel
  - Has obtained accreditation by the NIAZ
  - Disposes of 294 beds
- Imeldaziekenhuis
  - Located in Bonheiden
  - Has obtained accreditation by the NIAZ
  - Disposes of 502 beds
- AZ Sint-Elisabeth
  - Located in Herentals
  - Has obtained accreditation by the NIAZ
  - Disposes of 243 beds
- AZ Sint-Jozef
  - Located in Malle
  - Has obtained accreditation by the NIAZ
  - Disposes of 250 beds
- Heilig Hartziekenhuis Mol
  - Located in Mol
  - Has obtained accreditation by the NIAZ
  - Disposes of 183 beds
- Heilig Hartziekenhuis Lier
  - Located in Lier
  - Has obtained accreditation by the NIAZ
  - Disposes of 451 beds
- AZ Sint-Maarten
  - Located in Mechelen
  - Has obtained accreditation by the NIAZ
  - Disposes of 643 beds

==== Specialised hospitals ====
- Revalidatieziekenhuis RevArte
  - Rehabilitation hospital
  - Located in Edegem
  - Has obtained accreditation by the NIAZ
  - Disposes of 194 beds
- Ziekenhuis Netwerk Antwerpen: PZ Stuivenberg
  - Psychiatric hospital (part of ZNA network)
  - Located in Antwerp
  - Has obtained accreditation by the JCI
  - Disposes of 313 beds
- UPC Duffel (associated with UZA)
  - Psychiatric hospital
  - Located in Duffel
  - Has not obtained hospital-wide accreditation
  - Disposes of 601 beds
- Multiversum
  - Psychiatric hospital
  - Hospital sites located in Boechout and Mortsel
  - Has obtained accreditation by the NIAZ
  - Disposes of 591 beds (all sites)
- PZ Bethaniënhuis
  - Psychiatric hospital
  - Hospital sites located in Kapellen and Zoersel
  - Has not obtained hospital-wide accreditation
  - Disposes of 621 beds (all sites)
- OPZ Geel
  - Psychiatric hospital
  - Located in Geel
  - Has not obtained hospital-wide accreditation
  - Disposes of 316 beds and 431 places in family care

=== Flemish Brabant ===
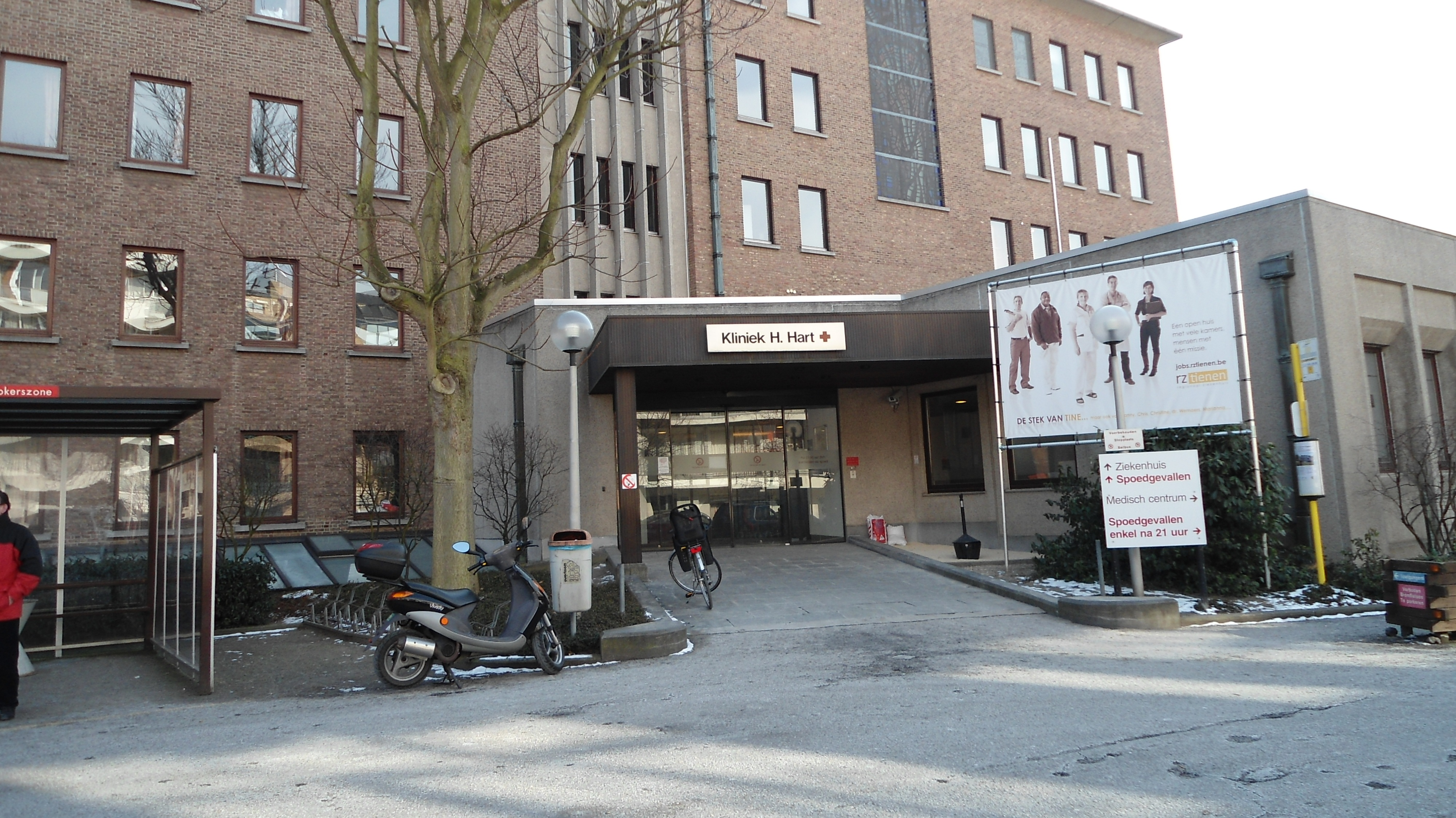
RZ Heilig Hart Tienen.

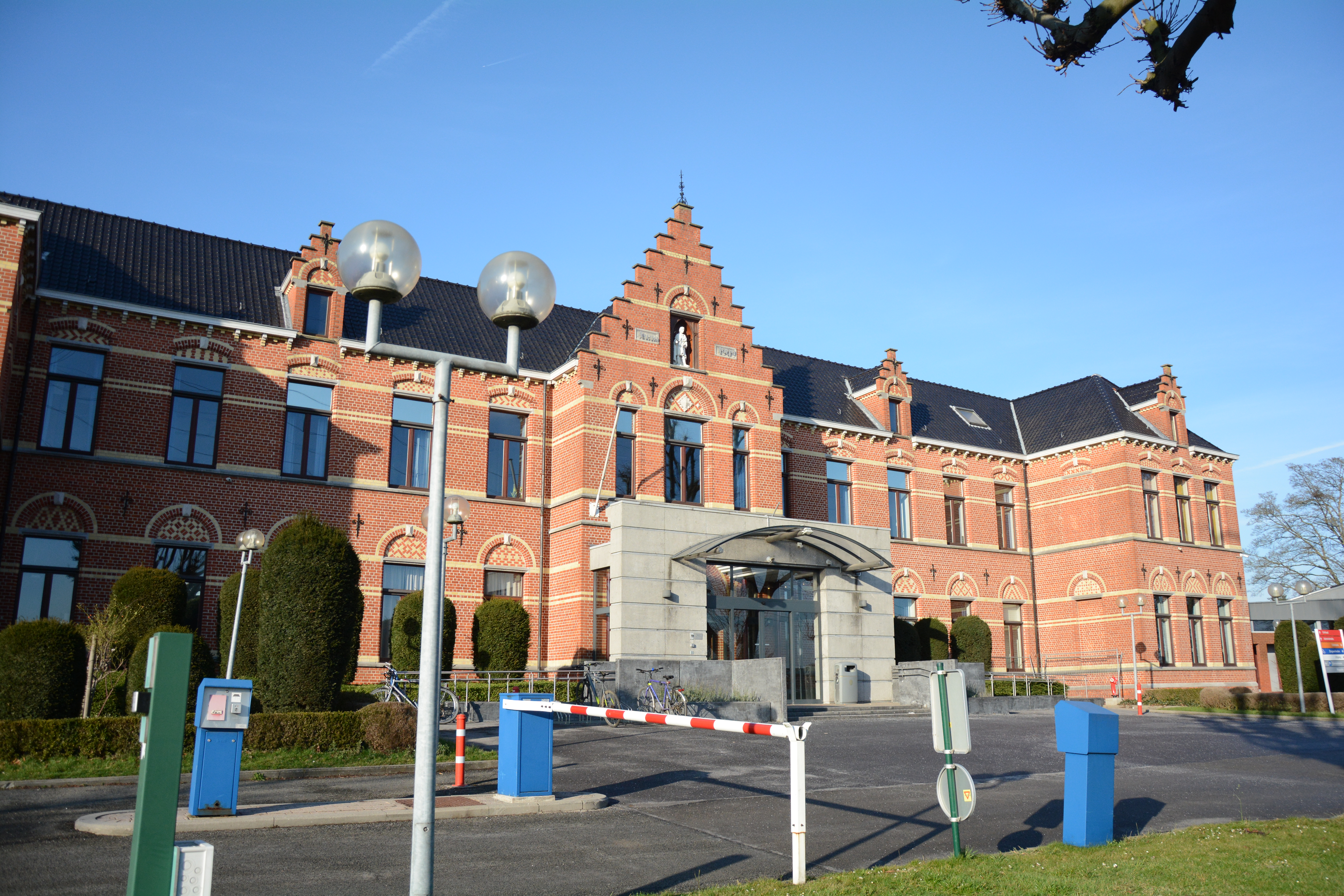
PZ Sint-Alexius, Grimbergen.

==== General hospitals ====
- AZ Sint-Maria
  - Located in Halle
  - Has obtained accreditation by the NIAZ
  - Disposes of 350 beds
- Onze-Lieve-Vrouwziekenhuis
  - Hospital sites located in Asse and East Flanders
  - Has obtained accreditation by the JCI
  - Disposes of 844 beds (all sites)
- AZ Jan Portaels
  - Located in Vilvoorde
  - Has obtained accreditation by the NIAZ
  - Disposes of 406 beds
- RZ Heilig Hart Leuven
  - Located in Leuven
  - Has obtained accreditation by the NIAZ
  - Disposes of 287 beds
- RZ Heilig Hart Tienen
  - Hospital sites located in Aarschot and Tienen
  - Has obtained accreditation by the NIAZ
  - Disposes of 303 beds (all sites)
- AZ Diest
  - Hospital sites located in Diest
  - Has obtained accreditation by the JCI
  - Disposes of 214 beds (all sites)
- UZ Leuven (associated with the KU Leuven)
  - Hospital sites located in Leuven and Lubbeek
  - Has obtained accreditation by the JCI
  - Disposes of 1,758 beds (all sites)

==== Specialised hospitals ====
- Revalidatieziekenhuis Inkendaal
  - Rehabilitation hospital
  - Located in Sint-Pieters-Leeuw
  - Has obtained accreditation by the NIAZ
  - Disposes of 178 beds
- National Multiple Sclerosis Centre
  - Rehabilitation hospital
  - Located in Steenokkerzeel
  - Has obtained accreditation by the JCI
  - Disposes of 120 beds
- PZ Sint-Annendael
  - Psychiatric hospital
  - Located in Diest
  - Has obtained accreditation by the NIAZ
  - Disposes of 178 beds
- UPC KU Leuven (associated with the KU Leuven)
  - Psychiatric hospital
  - Hospital sites located in Kortenberg and Leuven
  - Has obtained accreditation by the JCI
  - Disposes of 596 beds (all sites)
- UPC Sint-Kamillus (associated with the KU Leuven)
  - Psychiatric hospital
  - Hospital sites located in Bierbeek and Leuven
  - Has obtained accreditation by the NIAZ
  - Disposes of 385 beds (all sites)
- PZ Sint-Alexius
  - Psychiatric hospital
  - Located in Grimbergen
  - Has obtained accreditation by the NIAZ
  - Disposes of 169 beds
- PK Alexianen Tienen
  - Psychiatric hospital
  - Hospital sites located in Leuven and Tienen
  - Has obtained accreditation by the NIAZ
  - Disposes of 300 beds (all sites)

=== Limburg ===
==== General hospitals ====
- Jessa Ziekenhuis
  - Hospital sites located in Hasselt and Herk-de-Stad
  - Has obtained accreditation by the NIAZ
  - Disposes of 981 beds (all sites)
- Ziekenhuis Oost-Limburg
  - Hospital sites located in Genk and Lanaken
  - Has obtained accreditation by the JCI
  - Disposes of 811 beds (all sites)
- Sint-Franciscusziekenhuis
  - Located in Heusden-Zolder
  - Has obtained accreditation by the NIAZ
  - Disposes of 268 beds
- Sint-Trudo Ziekenhuis
  - Located in Sint-Truiden
  - Has obtained accreditation by the JCI
  - Disposes of 310 beds
- Ziekenhuis Maas en Kempen
  - Located in Maaseik
  - Has obtained accreditation by the NIAZ
  - Disposes of 213 beds
- Mariaziekenhuis Noord-Limburg
  - Located in Pelt
  - Has obtained accreditation by the NIAZ
  - Disposes of 333 beds
- AZ Vesalius
  - Hospital sites located in Bilzen and Tongeren
  - Has obtained accreditation by the NIAZ
  - Disposes of 326 beds (all sites)

==== Specialised hospitals ====
- Revalidatie & MS Centrum
  - Rehabilitation hospital
  - Located in Pelt
  - Has obtained accreditation by the NIAZ
  - Disposes of 120 beds
- PZ Asster
  - Psychiatric hospital
  - Hospital sites located in Sint-Truiden
  - Has not obtained hospital-wide accreditation
  - Disposes of 581 beds (all sites)
- Medisch Centrum Sint-Jozef
  - Psychiatric hospital
  - Located in Bilzen
  - Has obtained accreditation by the NIAZ
  - Disposes of 330 beds
- Kinderpsychiatrisch Centrum Genk
  - Psychiatric hospital
  - Located in Genk
  - Has not obtained hospital-wide accreditation
  - Disposes of 27 beds
- OPZ Rekem
  - Psychiatric hospital
  - Located in Lanaken
  - Has obtained accreditation by the NIAZ
  - Disposes of 288 beds

== Brussels-Capital Region ==
Due to its bilingual nature, hospitals in the Brussels-Capital Region can be either monolingual Dutch, monolingual French or bilingual. University hospitals belong to one of the two linguistic communities and are therefore monolingual Dutch or French by law. Other public hospitals managed by a public authority have to be bilingual by law. Private hospitals not managed by a public authority are legally not bound to either language, but most cater to both. However, all hospital emergency services in the Brussels-Capital Region (no matter if they're part of a public or private hospital) are required to be bilingual, since patients transported by emergency ambulance do not have a free choice to which hospital they will be brought. Mind that this is only the de iure situation, de facto are some hospitals that are legally required to be bilingual seriously lacking in personnel that's proficient in the other language. This list indicates whether hospitals or hospital networks are officially monolingual or bilingual. The name of the bilingual hospitals is also given in the two languages.

Additionally, hospitals where younger members of the Belgian royal family were born are indicated with an asterisk (*).

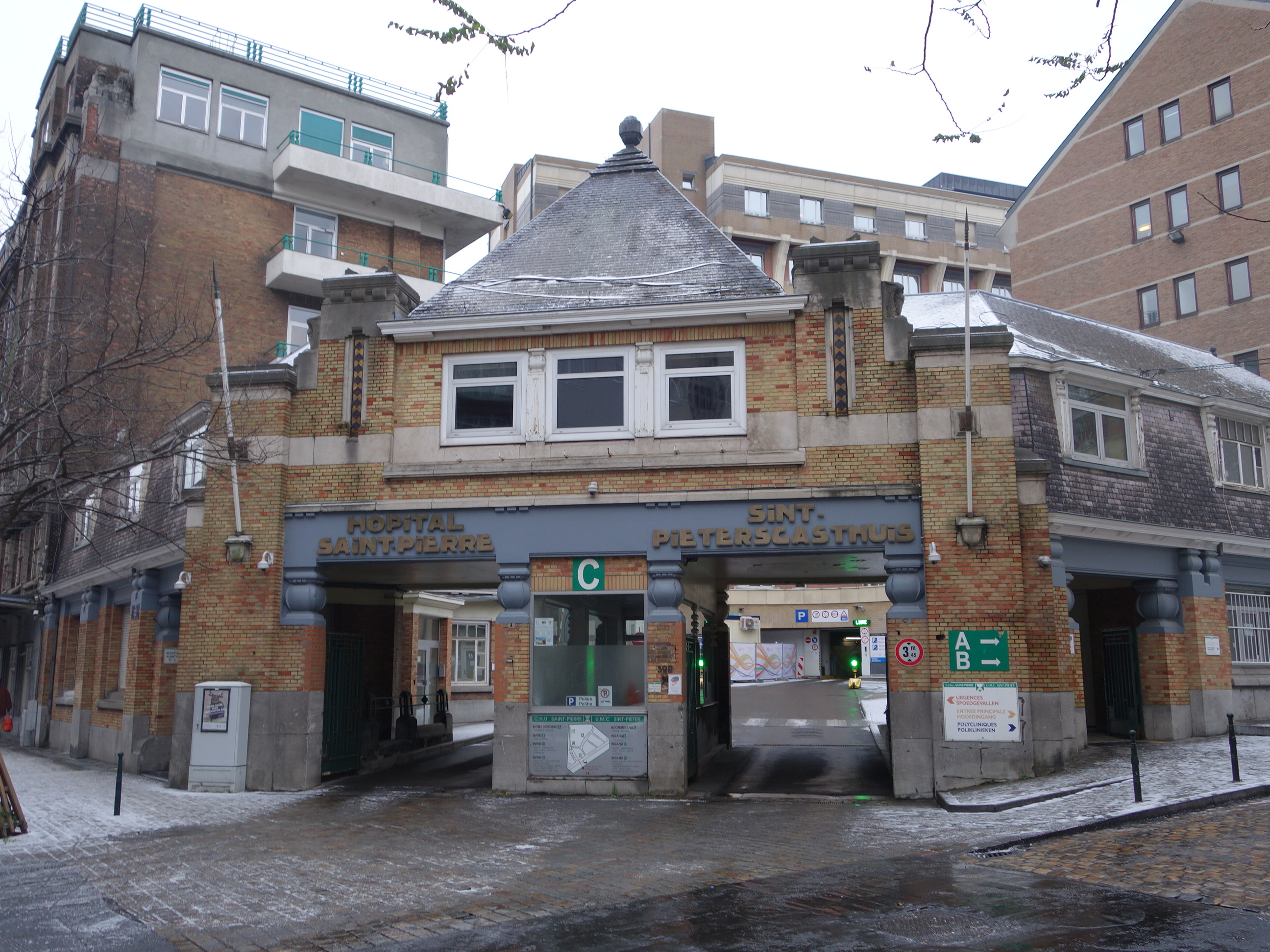
UMC Sint-Pieter / CHU Saint-Pierre, City of Brussels.

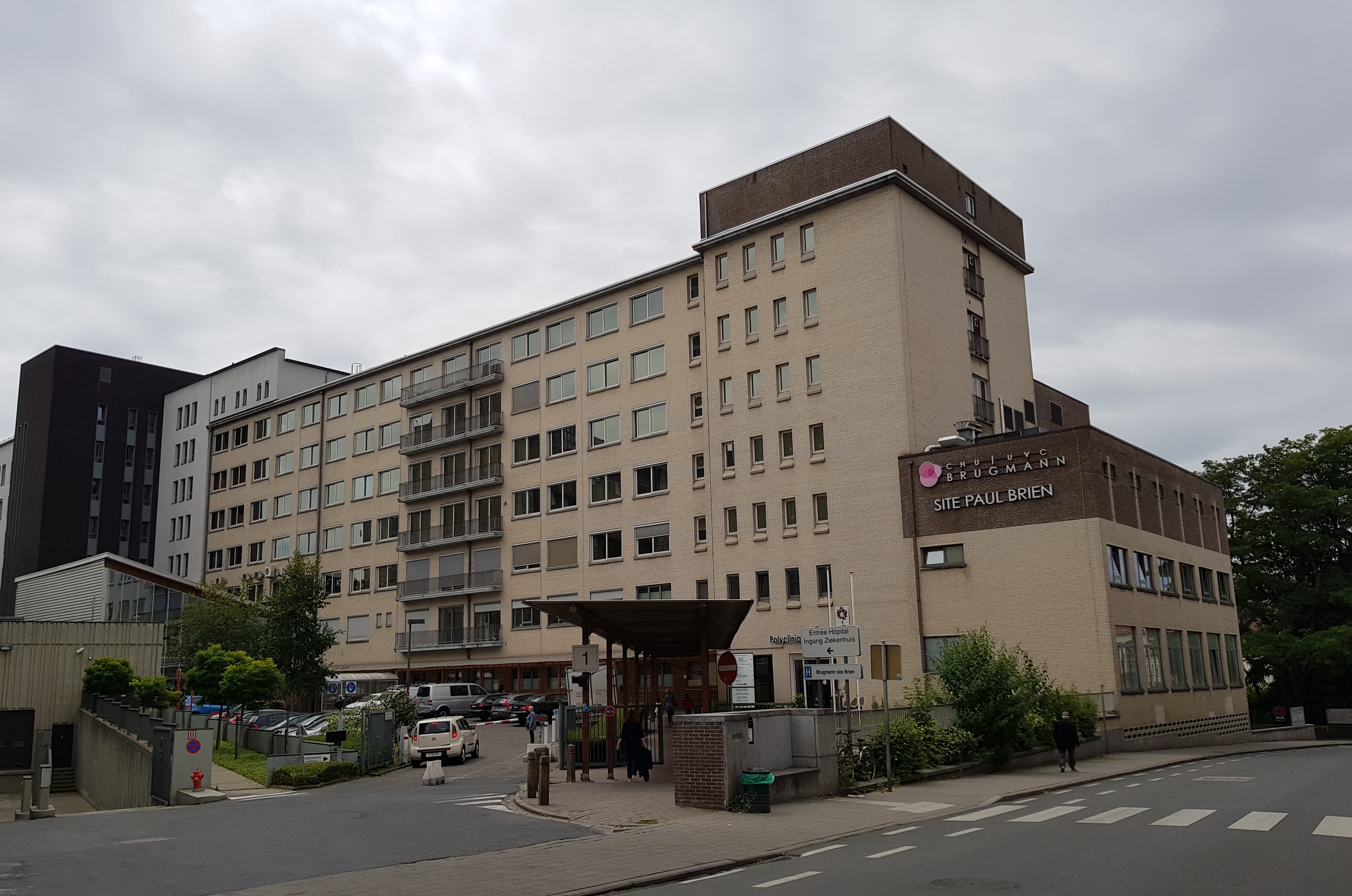
UVC Brugmann / CHU Brugmann site Paul Brien, Schaerbeek.

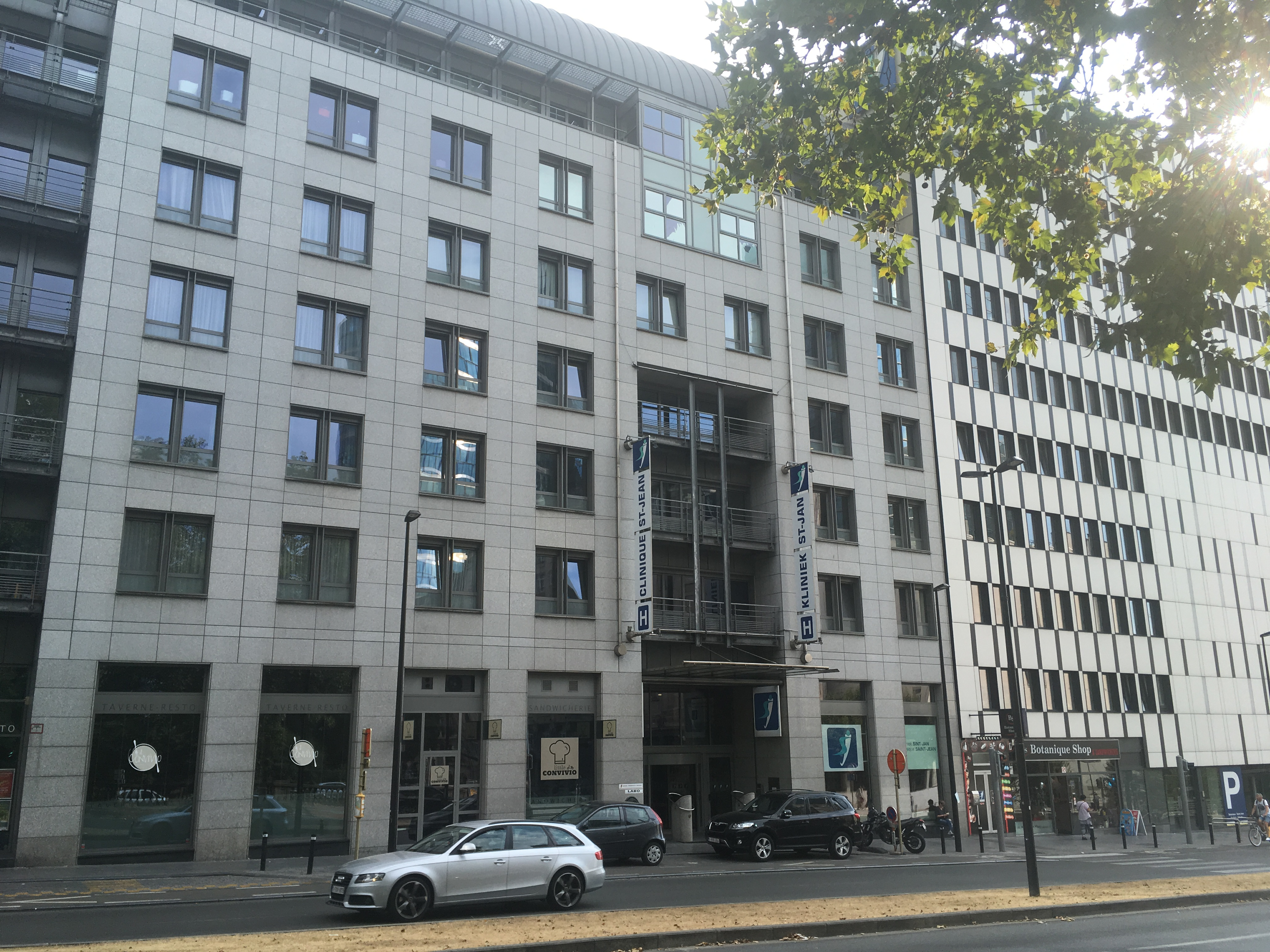
Kliniek Sint-Jan / Clinique Saint-Jean site Kruidtuin / Botanique, City of Brussels.

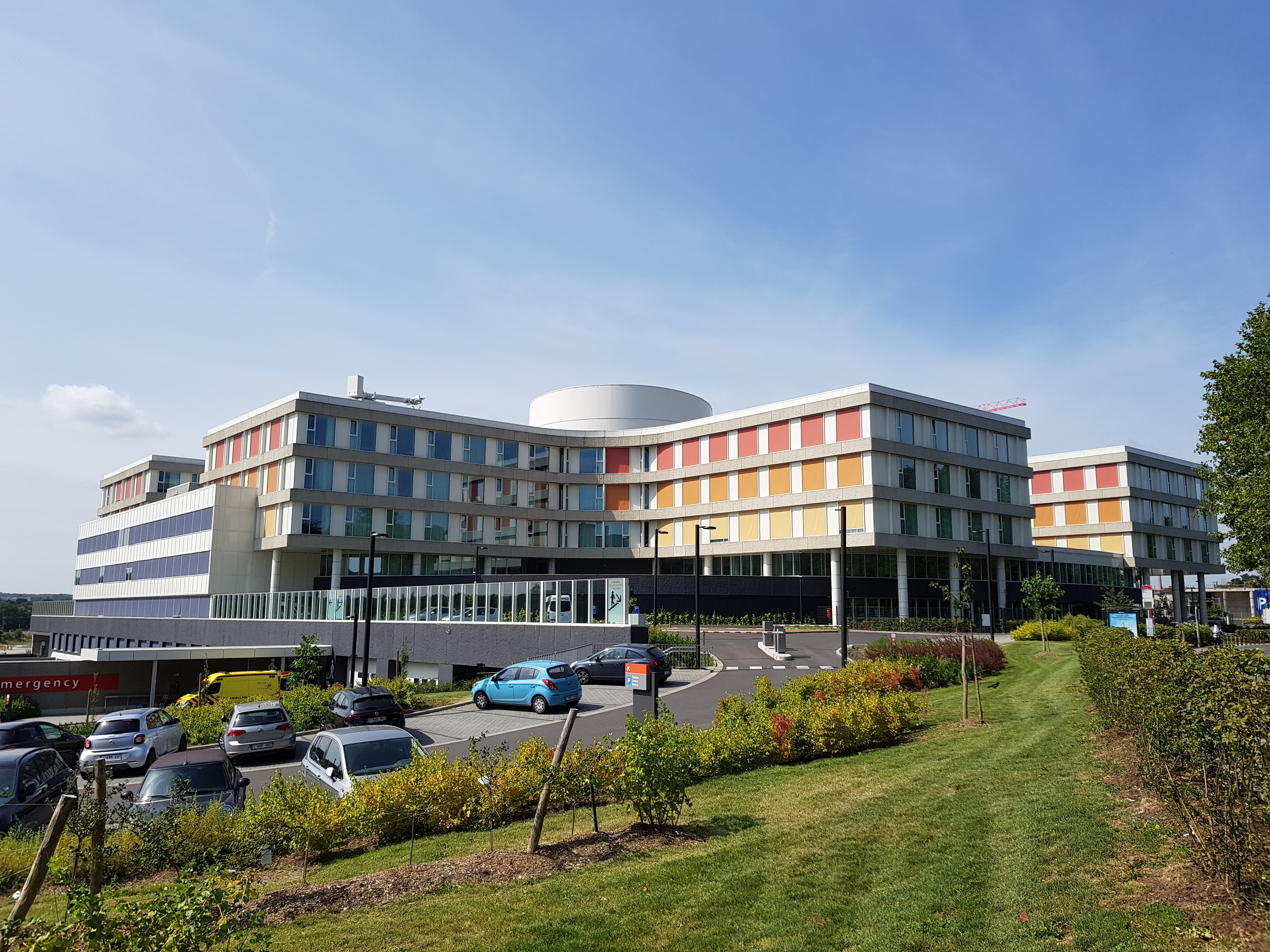
CHIREC Delta Hospital, Auderghem.

=== General hospitals ===
- UMC Sint-Pieter / CHU Saint-Pierre (associated with the ULB and VUB)
  - Hospital sites located in the City of Brussels
  - Has obtained accreditation by ACI
  - Disposes of 582 beds (all sites)
  - Bilingual Dutch-French
- UVC Brugmann / CHU Brugmann (associated with the ULB and VUB)
  - Hospital sites located in Laeken, Neder-Over-Heembeek and Schaerbeek
  - Has not obtained hospital-wide accreditation
  - Disposes of 853 beds (all sites)
  - Bilingual Dutch-French
- UZ Brussel (associated with the VUB)
  - Located in Jette
  - Has obtained accreditation by the JCI
  - Disposes of 721 beds
  - Monolingual Dutch
- Cliniques universitaires Saint-Luc (*) (associated with the UCLouvain)
  - Located in Woluwe-Saint-Lambert
  - Has obtained accreditation by ACI
  - Disposes of 973 beds
  - Monolingual French
- Hôpital Erasme (*) (associated with the ULB)
  - Hospital sites located in Anderlecht, Laeken and Woluwe-Saint-Lambert
  - Has not obtained hospital-wide accreditation
  - Disposes of 858 beds
  - Monolingual French
- Iris Ziekenhuizen Zuid / Hôpitaux Iris Sud
  - Hospital sites located in Anderlecht, Etterbeek, Forest and Ixelles
  - Has not obtained hospital-wide accreditation
  - Disposes of 550 beds (all sites)
  - Bilingual Dutch-French
- Kliniek Sint-Jan / Clinique Saint-Jean (*)
  - Hospital sites located in the City of Brussels, Jette and Saint-Josse-ten-Noode
  - Has not obtained hospital-wide accreditation
  - Disposes of 548 beds (all sites)
  - Bilingual Dutch-French (not subject to language laws)
- Europa Ziekenhuizen / Cliniques de l'Europe
  - Hospital sites located in Etterbeek and Uccle
  - Has not obtained hospital-wide accreditation
  - Disposes of 715 beds (all sites)
  - Bilingual Dutch-French (not subject to language laws)
- CHIREC
  - Hospital sites located in Anderlecht, Auderghem, Ganshoren and Walloon Brabant
  - Has not obtained hospital-wide accreditation
  - Disposes of 1,052 beds (all sites)
  - Bilingual Dutch-French (not subject to language laws)
- Queen Astrid Military Hospital (part of the Armed Forces)
  - Located in Neder-Over-Heembeek
  - Has not obtained hospital-wide accreditation
  - Disposes of an unknown number of beds
  - Bilingual Dutch-French (military institution)

=== Specialised hospitals ===
- Institut Jules Bordet (associated with the ULB)
  - Cancer hospital
  - Located in Anderlecht
  - Has not obtained hospital-wide accreditation
  - Disposes of 160 beds
  - Bilingual Dutch-French
- UKZKF / HUDERF (associated with UVC/CHU Brugmann)
  - Children's hospital
  - Located in Laeken
  - Has obtained accreditation by ACI
  - Disposes of 178 beds
  - Bilingual Dutch-French
- SILVA medical
  - Geriatric, rehabilitation and psychiatric hospital
  - Hospital sites located in Molenbeek-Saint-Jean and Walloon Brabant
  - Has not obtained hospital-wide accreditation
  - Disposes of 440 beds (all sites)
  - Bilingual Dutch-French (not subject to language laws)
- Valisana (associated with Saint-Luc)
  - Rehabilitation and psychiatric hospital
  - Hospital sites located in Saint-Josse-ten-Noode and Berchem-Sainte-Agathe
  - Has not obtained hospital-wide accreditation
  - Disposes of 275 beds (all sites)
  - Bilingual Dutch-French (not subject to language laws)
- Centre Hospitalier Jean Titeca
  - Psychiatric hospital
  - Located in Schaerbeek
  - Has not obtained hospital-wide accreditation
  - Disposes of 255 beds
  - Monolingual French (not subject to language laws)
- Epsylon
  - Psychiatric hospital
  - Hospital sites located in Uccle
  - Has not obtained hospital-wide accreditation
  - Disposes of 312 beds (all sites)
  - Monolingual French (not subject to language laws)
- Kliniek Zonder Zorgen / Clinique Sans Souci
  - Psychiatric hospital
  - Located in Jette
  - Has not obtained hospital-wide accreditation
  - Disposes of 145 beds
  - Bilingual Dutch-French (not subject to language laws)
- Psycho-sociaal Centrum Sint-Alexius
  - Psychiatric hospital
  - Located in Ixelles
  - Has not obtained hospital-wide accreditation
  - Disposes of 44 beds
  - Monolingual Dutch (not subject to language laws)

== Walloon Region ==
=== Walloon Brabant ===
==== General hospitals ====
- Clinique Saint-Pierre
  - Located in Ottignies-Louvain-la-Neuve
  - Has obtained accreditation by ACI
  - Disposes of 425 beds
- CHIREC
  - Hospital sites located in Braine-l'Alleud and the Brussels-Capital Region
  - Has not obtained hospital-wide accreditation
  - Disposes of 1,052 beds (all sites)
- Groupe Jolimont
  - Hospital sites located in Nivelles and Hainaut
  - Has obtained accreditation by ACI
  - Disposes of 885 beds (all sites)

==== Specialised hospitals ====
- SILVA medical
  - Geriatric, rehabilitation and psychiatric hospital
  - Hospital sites located in Waterloo, Wavre and the Brussels-Capital Region
  - Has not obtained hospital-wide accreditation
  - Disposes of 440 beds (all sites)
- CHN William Lennox (associated with Saint-Luc)
  - Psychiatric hospital
  - Located in Ottignies-Louvain-la-Neuve
  - Has obtained accreditation by ACI
  - Disposes of 159 beds
- Centre Hospitalier Le Domaine (associated with the ULB)
  - Psychiatric hospital
  - Located in Braine-l'Alleud
  - Has not obtained hospital-wide accreditation
  - Disposes of 143 beds
- La Petite Maison
  - Psychiatric hospital
  - Located in Chastre
  - Has not obtained hospital-wide accreditation
  - Disposes of 60 beds

=== Hainaut ===
- Centre de Santé des Fagnes, Chimay
- Centre Hospitalier de Jolimont-Lobbes, La Louvière and Lobbes
- Centre Hospitalier EpiCura, Ath, Baudour and Hornu (ULB)
- Centre Hospitalier Régional, Mons and Boussu
- CH de Mouscron, Mouscron
- CHU de Charleroi, Charleroi (ULB)
- CHU Tivoli, La Louvière (ULB)
- CHR Haute-Senne (UCLouvain - ULB)
  - Saint Vincent, Soignies
  - Le Tilleriau, Soignies
  - Centre Médical Brainois, Braine-le-Comte
  - Centre Médical de Tubize, Tubize
  - Centre Médical d’Enghien, Enghien
  - Le Goéland, Neufvilles
- CHR Clinique Saint-Joseph, Colfontaine (UCLouvain)
- CHR Mons-Hainaut, Mons (UCLouvain)
- CHWAPI (Centre Hospitalier de Wallonie picarde), Tournai
- CNDG (Clinique Notre-Dame de Grâce), Gosselies (UCLouvain)
- Grand Hôpital de Charleroi, Charleroi
- Hôpital Ambroise Paré, Mons (ULB)
- Hôpital de Warquignies, Colfontaine (UCLouvain)

=== Namur ===
- CHR de Namur, Namur
- CHR Val de Sambre, Sambreville
- CHU UCLouvain Namur (UCLouvain)
  - CHU UCLouvain Sainte-Élisabeth, Namur
  - Centre Hospitalier de Dinant, Dinant
  - CHU UCLouvain Mont-Godinne, Yvoir
- Saint-Luc Bouge, Namur
- Beau Vallon Psychiatric Hospital, Saint-Servais (UCLouvain Saint-Luc)

=== Liège ===
- Groupe santé CHC, Liège
- Centre Hospitalier du Bois de l'Abbaye et de Hesbaye, Seraing
- Centre Hospitalier Peltzer La Tourelle, Verviers
- CHR Citadelle, Liège (ULiège)
- CHR Huy, Huy
- CHU de Liège, Liège (ULiège)
- Clinique St. Josef, Saint-Vith
- Hôpital St. Nikolaus, Eupen

=== Luxembourg ===
- Vivalia
  - Six hospital sites (five general and one psychiatric)
  - Hospital sites located in Arlon, Bastogne, Bertrix, Libramont-Chevigny, Marche-en-Famenne and Virton
  - Has not obtained hospital-wide accreditation
  - Disposes of 1,190 beds (all sites)

== See also ==
- Healthcare in Belgium
