= Jessa Hospital =

Hospital in Hasselt, Belgium

Coordinates: 50.9258°N 5.3424°E

Jessa Ziekenhuis
- Hospital network Andreaz
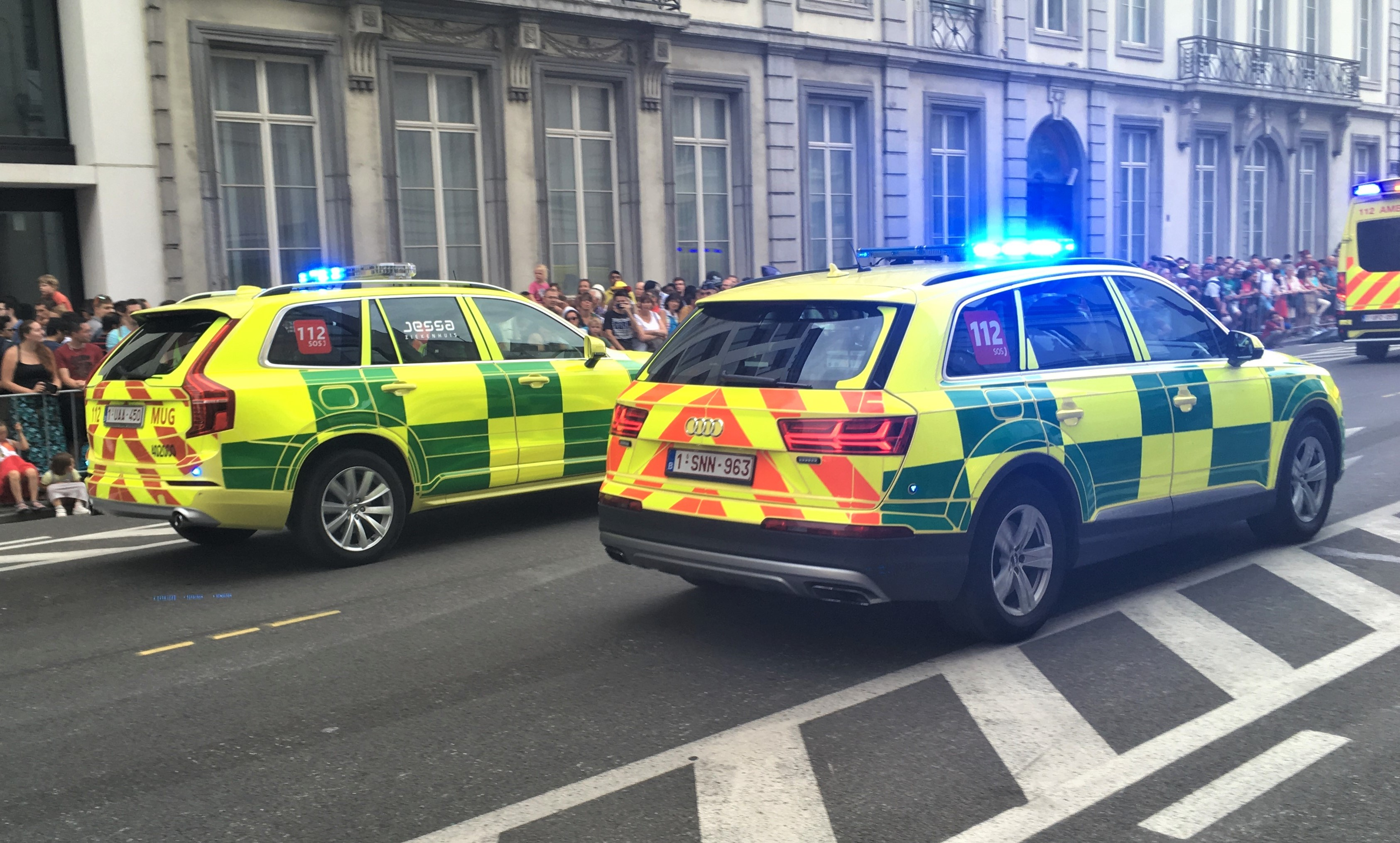
- Belgian MUG (Urgent Medical Assistance) vehicles with Battenburg colors and the Jessa Hospital logo at the Belgian National Parade of 21 July 2018.

Geography
- Location: Hasselt, Limburg (Belgium)

Organisation
- Type: Teaching, District General

Services
- Beds: 988

Helipads
- Helipad: Yes

History
- Opened: 2009 (merger)

Links
- Website: https://www.jessazh.be/

The Jessa Hospital (Dutch: Jessa Ziekenhuis) is a regional hospital with a university hospital-like character in Hasselt, Belgium. It is the second largest hospital in the province of Limburg, after the Ziekenhuis Oost-Limburg with its main campus in Genk.

With its 981 licensed beds, Jessa Hospital is the fifth largest non-university hospital in Flanders. Besides the 3 care campuses; campus Virga Jesse on the Stadsomvaart of Hasselt, campus Salvator on Hasselt's major ring road, and the rehabilitation campus Sint-Ursula in Herk-de-Stad, a fourth logistics campus was established after the 2010 merger on the Ekkelgarden industrial estate, where the hospital's central warehouse and central sterilization department are located.

== Name ==
The name Jessa is derived from the hospital's 3 care campuses: JE from Virga Jesse, S from Saint-Ursula, and SA from Salvator.

== History ==
The Jessa Hospital was formed on 1 January 2010 from the merger of the urban Virga Jesse Hospital and the Catholic Salvator-Saint-Ursula (SASU) hospital, with the Salvator campus on the outskirts of the city of Hasselt and the Saint-Ursula campus in Herk-de-Stad.

=== Salvator hospital ===
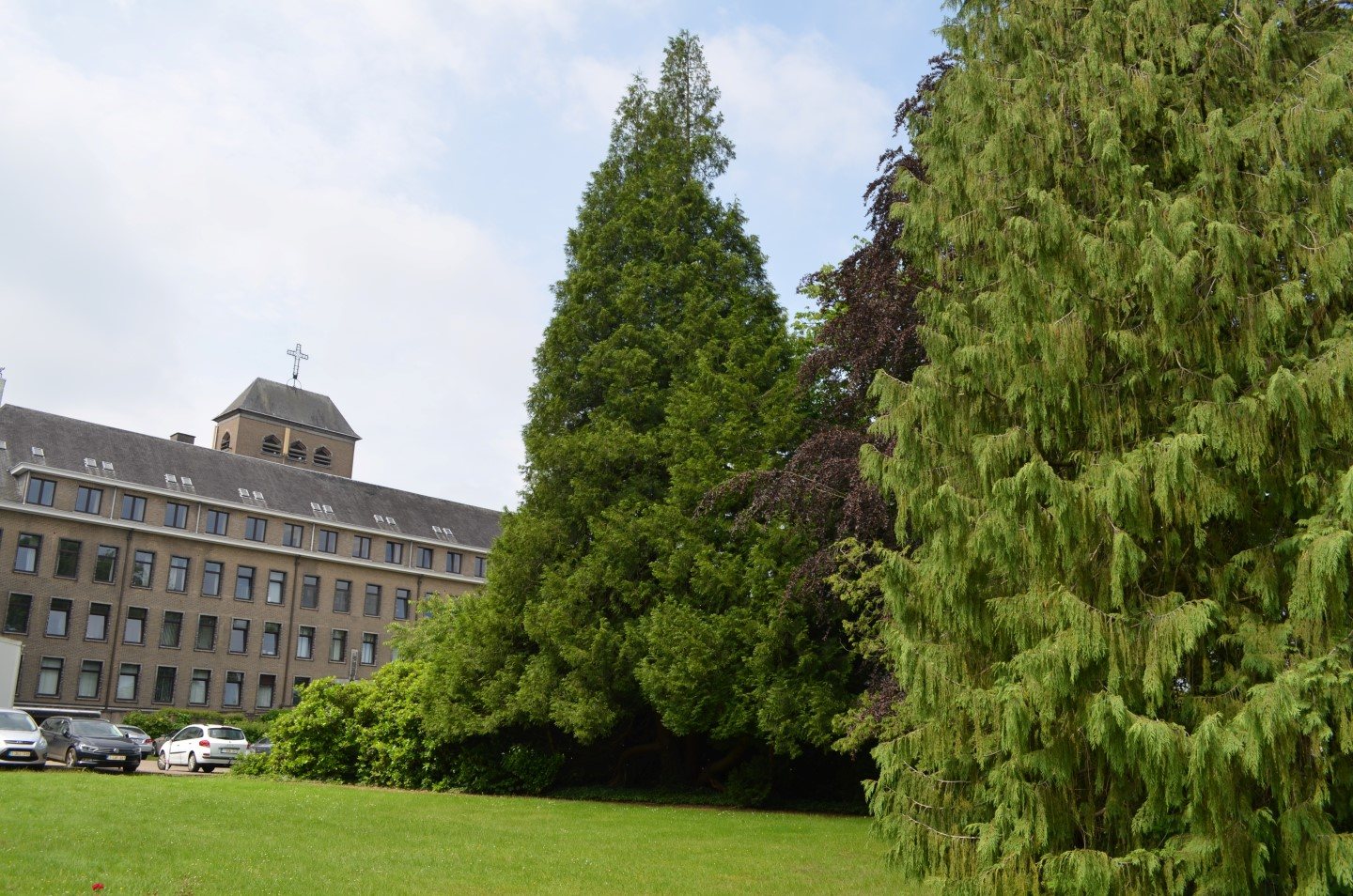
Part of the park and chapel of the hospital on the Salvator campus.

In 1924, the Salvator Clinic opened on the Luikersteenweg in Hasselt, founded by Salvatorian nuns. This clinic was the first acute private hospital in the Belgian province of Limburg. As the property of the Salvatorian Sisters, a private hospital was established in 1926 on the estate of the Castle 't Hollandt in Hasselt, which would later be expanded to become the Salvator Hospital. In 1931, the Salvator Hospital was further expanded to also include a nursing school, Mater Salvatoris. Later, this school was transformed into the Free Technical Institute (VTI).

After several renovations and expansions, the Salvator Hospital grew to become one of Limburg's largest private hospitals. A new convent building was completed in 1949 and a new wing of the hospital in 1950. From 1962 to 1964, the buildings of the new clinic were constructed.

In 1974, a retirement home for 150 senior citizens was also opened on the Salvator Hospital campus. A student peda was also built behind the old castle park and pond. Since 1994, the new monastery complex behind it has provided a residential and care center for dementia and Alzheimer's patients. The complex includes a public chapel, a residence and rest home for the Salvatorian community of sisters and a rest home for the White Sisters of Africa.

In 1996, the Salvator Hospital merged with the Saint-Ursula Hospital in Herk-de-Stad.

==== Salvator-Saint-Ursula (SASU) hospital ====
In January 2001, the Sint-Franciscusziekenhuis of Heusden-Zolder and the hospitals AZ Salvator-Saint-Ursula with campuses in Hasselt and Herk-de-Stad announced that they had concluded a merger agreement and would henceforth be called the Christian General Hospital Mid-Limburg (Dutch: Christelijk Algemeen Ziekenhuis Midden-Limburg or C.A.Z. Midden-Limburg). According to then chairman Karel Peeters, the C.A.Z. Midden-Limburg would become the second largest hospital in the province of Limburg in 2001. With the merger, the capacity would be over 663 beds, 1,200 employees and 160 physician-specialists. Later, in 2009, the merger with the Sint-Franciscusziekenhuis was dissolved and the hospital reverted back to the name of Salvator-Saint-Ursula (SASU) Hospital. In January 2010, the SASU Hospital merged with the Virga Jessa Hospital to form today's Jessa Hospital.

=== Saint-Ursula Hospital ===
The Saint-Ursula Hospital was founded in the 1950s by the Ursulines of the Ursuline Convent in Herk-de-Stad, after the convent had already served as a Red Cross post during both World War I and World War II. In 1996, the hospital merged with the Salvator Hospital in Hasselt to form the Salvator-Saint-Ursula Hospital (SASU). After the merger with the Salvator Hospital, the hospital began to focus more and more on rehabilitation.

=== Virga Jesse Hospital ===
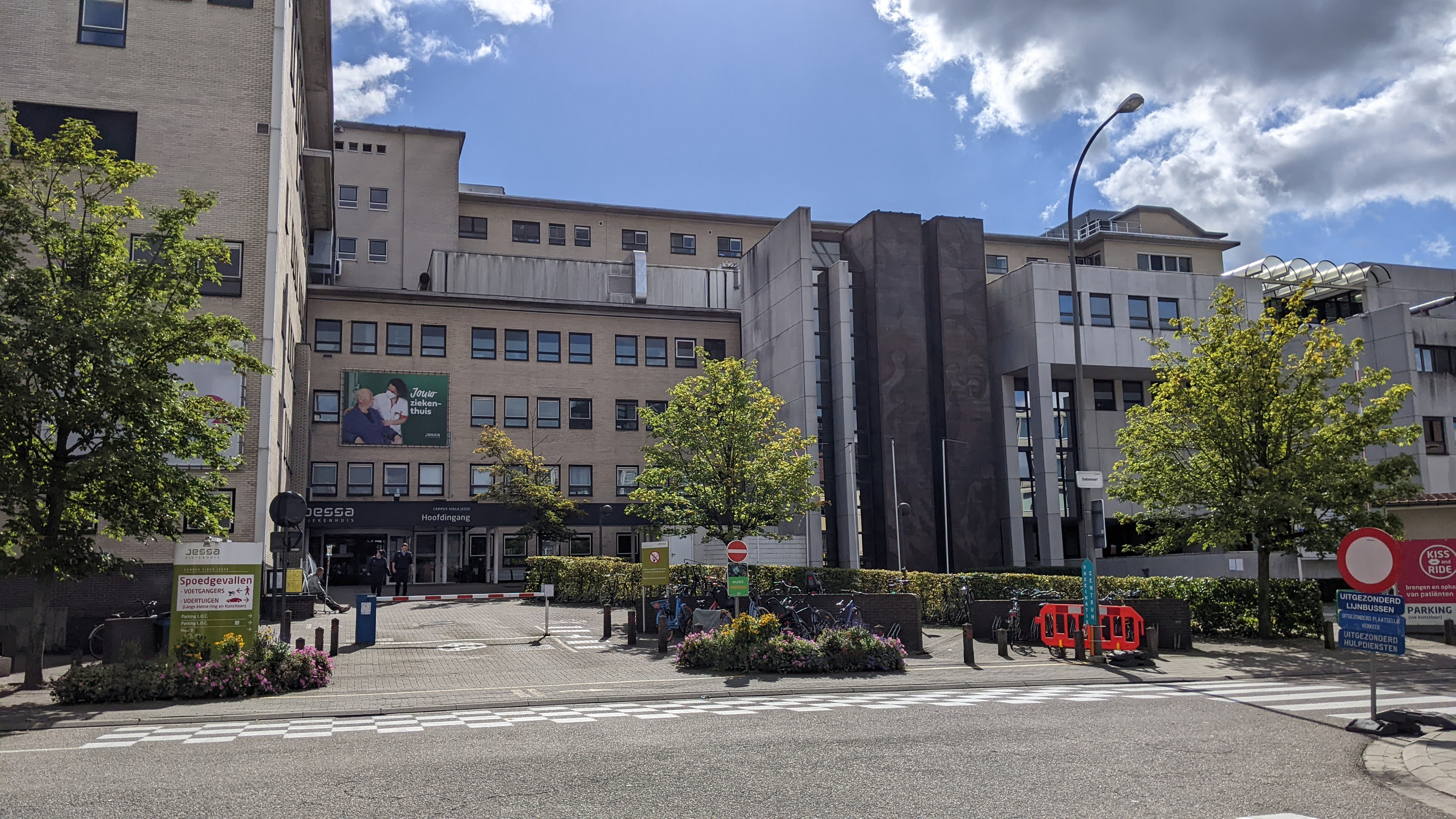
The main entrance to the Virga Jesse campus of the Jessa Hospital.

On 28 May 1626 three nuns moved into a building on Hasselt's Thonissen Avenue to care for the sick of Hasselt and the surrounding area. The building was a gift from the city magistrate, but soon proved too small. Without realizing it, the three nuns lay the foundation of what will be a large and modern hospital almost four hundred years later.

In 1868, construction begins for a new hospital along the Thonissen Avenue. The Valentinus Hospital opens its doors 4 years later. The Valentinus Hospital slowly expanded to a total of 140 beds. However, even this capacity soon proved insufficient.

The first postwar Commission of Public Assistance (the predecessor of the OCMW) took office in 1947 and immediately made the decision in principle to build a new hospital. On 23 September 1961 then-Mayor Bollen opened the Virga Jesse Hospital. The new hospital is dedicated to Our Lady Virga Jesse, the patroness of Hasselt. In 1965 the construction of two additional 7-storey wings began so that the total bed capacity expanded to over 600 beds.

From the 1990s, the hospital evolved rapidly. On 17 March 1995 the Limburg Oncological Center (LOC) officially opened its doors in the hospital's new L-wing. The LOC was founded three years earlier as a cancer cooperation initiative between the Salvator Hospital of Hasselt, the Saint Jans Hospital in Genk (now Ziekenhuis Oost-Limburg) and the Virga Jesse Hospital.

In the year 2000, the Virga Jesse Hospital spun off from the OCMW and became an autonomous care institution. The highest managing body of the hospital is no longer the OCMW council, but rather a general assembly and a board of directors, including a representation of the political parties. The hospital builds numerous partnerships with other hospitals.

On 20 June 2006 the Virga Jesse Hospital, together with the Salvator-Saint-Ursula Hospital (SASU), signed a draft agreement to merge. The merger has been a reality since 1 January 2010.

=== Expansion and new hospital ===
The Jessa Hospital submitted a subsidy dossier to the Flemish Government in March 2013 for the construction of a new hospital on the current Salvator campus. The dossier for the new building was co-developed by a temporary association consisting of four partner architects: Osar, Baumschlager & Eberle, Technum and De Gregorio. The design will be a hospital with two 20-storey towers against the E313 highway in Hasselt. From the towers, patients and visitors to the hospital will have a view of Haspengouw on one side and a new park on the Salvator Campus that runs down to Hasselt's major ring road. If financing for the project is complete, work on the new building will begin in 2023 and should be completed in 2030. The cost of the new building is estimated at 550 million euros, of which about 370 million euros will come in subsidies from the Flemish Government.

== Services ==
Jessa Hospital has been counseling patients with HIV since 2008, and in 2019 the government recognized the hospital as an HIV reference center. The HIV reference center is headed by Prof. Dr. Peter Messiaen, head of service and infectiologist-internist.

== Hospital network ==
Since 2019, the Jessa Hospital is part of the hospital network Andreaz, formerly known as the hospital network South-West Limburg (Dutch: Ziekenhuisnetwerk Zuid-West Limburg), together with the Sint-Trudo Hospital in Sint-Truiden, the Saint-Francis Hospital in Heusden-Zolder, and the AZ Vesalius in Tongeren. The hospital network covers a population of 530.000 people in the province of Limburg.

== See also ==
- List of hospitals in Belgium
- Healthcare in Belgium
