= Cliniques universitaires Saint-Luc =

Hospital in Brussels, Belgium

Saint-Luc University Hospital
- University of Louvain
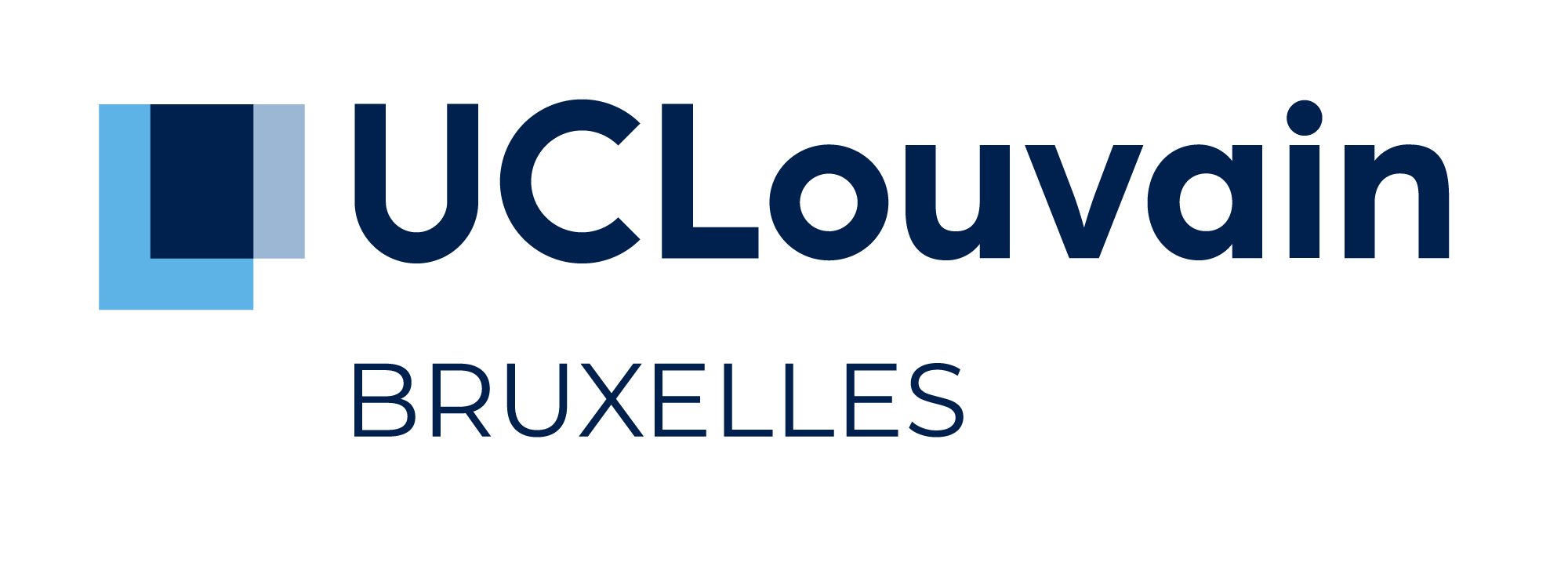

- Sedes Sapientiae, seal of UCLouvain

Geography
- Location: UCLouvain Brussels Woluwe, 1200 Woluwe-Saint-Lambert, Brussels-Capital Region, Belgium
- Coordinates: 50°51′07.4″N 04°27′08.5″E

Organisation
- Care system: Private ASBL
- Type: Teaching
- Affiliated university: UCLouvain
- Patron: Saint Luke

Services
- Emergency department: Yes
- Beds: 973

Helipads
- Helipad: ICAO: EBUC

History
- Founded: 1976

Links
- Website: www.saintluc.be/en
- Lists: Hospitals in Belgium

The Cliniques universitaires Saint-Luc (UCLouvain Saint-Luc) is a non-profit academic hospital of the University of Louvain (UCLouvain), located on the university campus of UCLouvain Brussels Woluwe in Woluwe-Saint-Lambert, Brussels, Belgium. The hospital opened on 23 August 1976, moving from Leuven to Brussels.

== History ==
In 1968, the Catholic University of Louvain acquired some land in the east of Brussels, which did not have a large hospital at that time. When the university split in two, the French-speaking departments moved from Leuven to Ottignies to found the new city of Louvain-la-Neuve, except for the medical faculty and health sciences sector, which moved to a newly built Brussels campus, now called UCLouvain Brussels Woluwe.

It is one of the two main university hospitals of the University of Louvain (UCLouvain), the other being the CHU UCLouvain Namur, in Namur Province (Wallonia).

== Research ==
Being a teaching and university hospital UCLouvain Saint-Luc continues to do ground breaking medical research. For example, the first baby born after ovarian transplant and the first photograph of human ovulation.

== Famous births ==
- Prince Amedeo, Princess Maria Laura and Prince Joachim, born in 1986, 1988 and 1991 respectively.
- Princess Louise of Belgium, twins Prince Nicolas of Belgium and Prince Aymeric of Belgium, born in 2004 and 2005, respectively.
