= SPOLD =

Multi-company association

Society for the Promotion of LCA Development (SPOLD) was the association of multiple companies that wanted to create a file format that would help mold Life-cycle assessment (LCA) software into a better management tool. The SPOLD format, which was created for this task, was meant to be implemented in LCA software so that it could exchange more reliable data in inventories. The original SPOLD format was created in 1997, but was later replaced in 1999 with a newer version. The SPOLD format was then replaced by the ecoSPOLD, which was later integrated with LCA software, replacing the original SPOLD format. SPOLD was discontinued in 2001.
