= Ghent University Hospital =

Coordinates: 51.024°N 3.726°E

Ghent University Hospital Universitair Ziekenhuis Gent (UZ Gent)
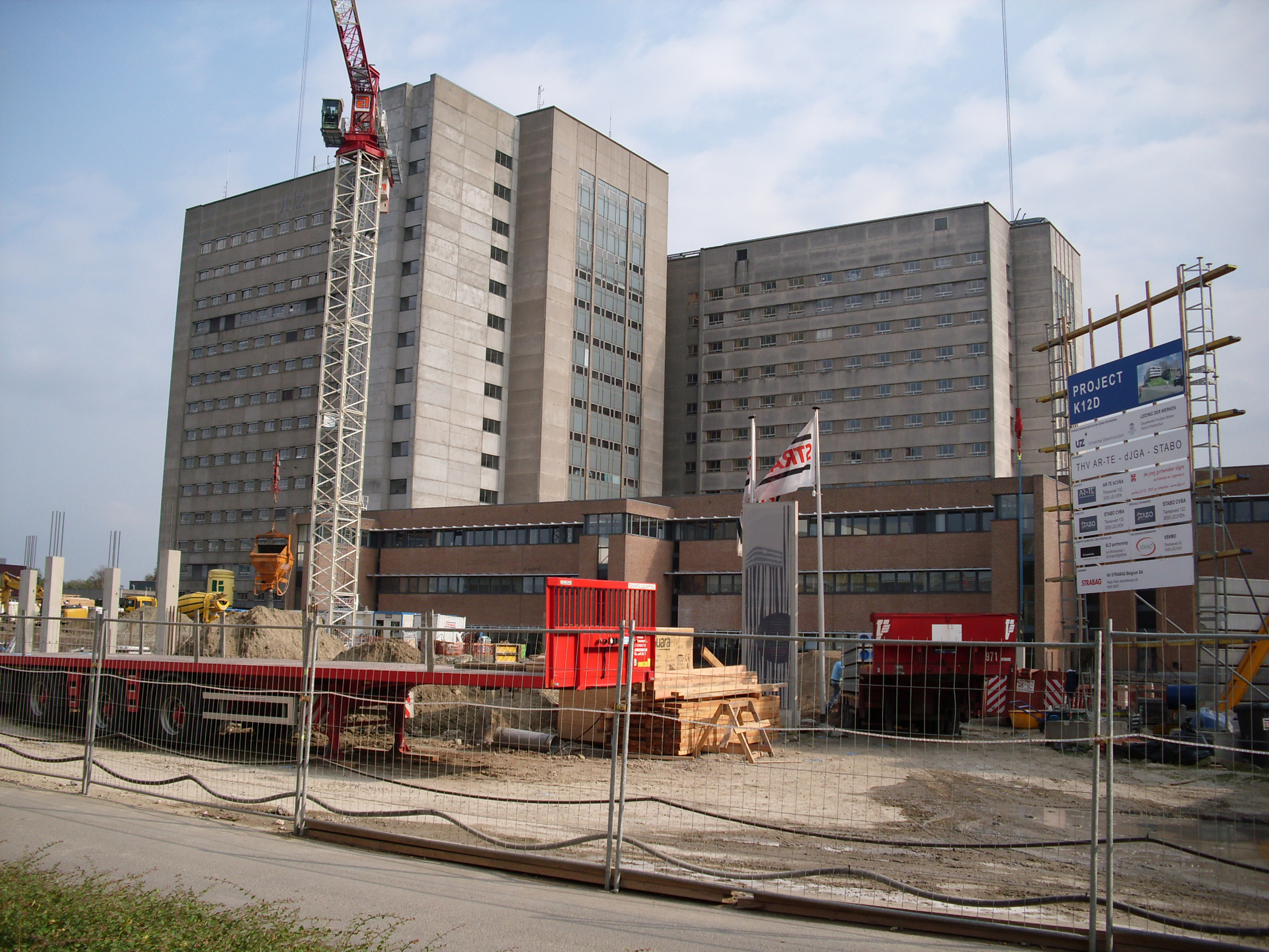

Geography
- Location: Ghent, Belgium

Organisation
- Type: Teaching hospital
- Affiliated university: Ghent University

Links
- Website: http://www.uzgent.be
- Lists: Hospitals in Belgium

Ghent University Hospital (Dutch: Universitair Ziekenhuis Gent; UZ Gent) is one of the largest hospitals in Belgium. It is closely linked to Ghent University, the university's rector also being the hospital's president. Both the university and the hospital are autonomous entities of the Flemish Government.

The hospital has more than 1,000 beds and about 6,000 employees.

The location of the hospital is also called "Campus Heymans", named after Nobel Prize winner Corneille Heymans. Located nearby is Ghelamco Arena, a stadium that opened in 2013.

== See also ==
- List of hospitals in Belgium
- Healthcare in Belgium
