= UCLouvain Faculty of Architecture, Architectural Engineering and Urban Planning =

Faculty of Architecture, Architectural Engineering and Urban Planning
- Faculté d'architecture, d'ingénierie architecturale, d'urbanisme
- Other names: LOCI
- Former names: École spéciale d'architecture (1867); Institut Jean Béthune (1882, Brussels); Institut Passy-Froyennes (1904, Tournai); École Saint-Luc Institut Supérieur d'Architecture (1838); Faculté d'Architecture, d'Ingénierie architecturale, d'Urbanisme et d'Aménagement du Territoire (2009)
- Type: Public university faculty
- Established: 2009 (17 years ago)
- Parent institution: UCLouvain
- Affiliations: Guild of European Research-Intensive Universities; CESAER; CLUSTER; Coimbra Group; IMCC; TIME
- Rector: Vincent Blondel
- Students: 1400
- Location: Brussels, Tournai, Louvain-la-Neuve, Belgium; 50.668372°N 4.620832°E
- Colours: Louvain blue & LOCI grey
- Website: uclouvain.be/en/loci
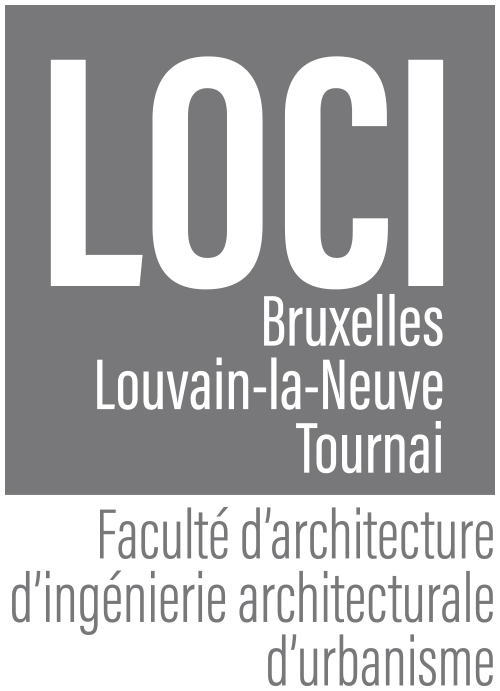

The Faculty of Architecture, Architectural Engineering and Urban Planning (in French: Faculté d'architecture, d'ingénierie architecturale, d'urbanisme), often called LOCI, is the 14th faculty of the University of Louvain, Belgium. It became an independent faculty in 2009, with the merger of three institutes founded between 1867 and 1882, and is active in Brussels (Saint-Gilles), Tournai and Louvain-la-Neuve.

== Description ==
=== Structure ===
LOCI is a component of UCLouvain's Science and Technology Sector (SST). Its headquarters and the dean's office are located in Louvain-la-Neuve, in buildings shared with the Louvain School of Engineering, though the majority of its students, staff, teaching and activity take place on the UCLouvain Brussels Saint-Gilles and UCLouvain Tournai campuses.

Its abbreviated name refers to Latin word for given places, loci.

Within the faculty, four different so-called Commissions de programme organise and supervise the teaching curricula: one commission for the bachelor's degrees in architecture (BARC), one for the bachelor in architectural civil engineering (BIAR), and same for the master's degrees (MARC and MIAR). In addition to these commissions which can be considered as undergraduate and graduate departments, the School of urbanism and territorial planning (URBA) coordinates teaching and research in urban planning.

=== Studies ===
LOCI organizes studies in architectural civil engineering in Louvain-la-Neuve, and architecture in Tournai and Brussels. Studies in architectural civil engineering are organized jointly with the Louvain School of Engineering. Together, the Louvain School of Engineering and LOCI hold 40% of the Wallonia-Brussels Federation's engineering students, making it the country's largest engineering school, by far.

==== Undergraduate studies (3 years) ====
- Bachelor in architecture (Brussels and Tournai)
- Bachelor in engineering science, orientation architectural civil engineer (Louvain-la-Neuve)

==== Graduate studies (2 years) ====
- Master : architectural civil engineer (Louvain-la-Neuve)
- Master in architecture (Brussels and Tournai)

==== Specialized masters (1 year) ====
- Specialized master's degree in urban and territorial planning (Louvain-la-Neuve)

==== Doctoral studies ====
- Doctorate in engineering sciences and technology
- Doctorate in construction engineering and urban planning

=== Research ===
At the research level, the faculty takes part in the Doctoral Commission of Engineering Sciences and Technology, Construction and Urban Planning (CDI). It also comprises a research institute within the faculty itself (LOCI-R or Faculté d'architecture, d'ingénierie architecturale, d'urbanisme - Recherche), being the university's only faculty comprising such structure. This institute is further made up of several research centres including:

- Architecture and Climate Research Centre
- Research and Study Centre for Territorial Action (CREAT)
- Laboratoire Analyse Architecture
- Structure & Technologie Research Team
- Uses&Spaces Research Team
- LoCiLoCal Research Team
- Mobility & Urbanism Research Team
- UrbaSuds Research Team

Other laboratories, centres and institutes were founded on particular campus, as LoCiLoCaL in Tournai, Metrolab in Brussels (a trans-disciplinary institute of the Brussels Capital-Region jointly organised by UCLouvain and the Université libre de Bruxelles) or the Doctoral Seminars on Sustainability in the Built Environment which are organised by eight Belgian universities (Hasselt, Ghent, Liège, VUB, ULB, KU Leuven and UCLouvain).

== History and locations ==
In application of the Bologna Process harmonising the European Higher Education Area, the faculty brings together the former Institut supérieur d'architecture Saint-Luc de Bruxelles and Institut supérieur d'architecture Saint-Luc de Wallonie in Tournai, and the architecture and urban planning units of the École polytechnique de Louvain (then called Faculty of Applied Sciences). The LOCI faculty thus occupies the campuses of Louvain-la-Neuve, UCLouvain Bruxelles Saint-Gilles and UCLouvain Tournai.

When it was founded in 2010, the faculty was for a short period called the Faculty of Architecture, Architectural Engineering, Town and Territorial Planning (AIAU).

=== Brussels Saint-Gilles ===
The Institut Saint-Luc de Bruxelles was founded under the name Institut Jean Béthune by the members of the Institut des Frères des écoles chrétiennes (the De La Salle Brothers), first in the Brussels municipality of Molenbeek-Saint-Jean in 1882, then in 1887 on rue des Palais in Schaerbeek. The École Saint-Luc Institut Supérieur d'Architecture was founded there in 1938 as a non-profit association. The Dutch-speaking equivalent of LOCI, the KU Leuven's Faculty of Architecture, is still located there, on its Sint-Lucas Brussel campus.

Like the one in Tournai, the institute was then part of the series of Saint-Luc art schools established in the majority of major Belgian cities. In the meantime, a Saint-Luc centre was created in the municipality of Saint-Gilles in 1904. Following the language crises of the 1960s and the Leuven crisis of 1968, the institute split in two and the French-speaking department of the Institute of Architecture moved to the municipality of Ixelles, near the Saint-Luc secondary school and art school already present in Saint-Gilles. The Institute of Architecture establishes its headquarters at 70 rue Defacqz, near avenue Louise, in a simple house. In reality, it is a vast settlement abandoned by the Meurice Institute of Chemistry (nowadays part of the Haute école libre Lucia de Brouckère and located on the CERIA campus in Anderlecht), hidden behind residential buildings and straddling Ixelles and Saint-Gilles. Lectures are also given in the building on rue d'Irlande, the headquarters of the Saint-Luc institutes in Brussels.

The folkloric student association Cercle des étudiants architectes de Saint-Luc was formed in 1973 followed by the association of former students of the ISA Saint-Luc in 1981, called Architecture Recherche Communication (dissolved in 2009). Yet a Catholic institution, the students of Saint-Luc are wearing the penne instead of the calotte. In 1986, the school's organizing power was again centralized and transferred to the "organizing committee of the Saint-Luc Institutes in Saint-Gilles".

In 1965, a vast international-style building was built on the Chaussée de Charleroi, n° 132 in Saint-Gilles, by architect Émile Verhaegen, also founder and president of the UCL-Saint-Luc research centre in Louvain-la-Neuve. The building which hosted offices, was taken over by the Institut Saint-Luc, of which Émile Verhaegen was a member, during the 1990s, and was from then on used by the ISA Saint-Luc. This remained the architecture school's main location until the merger with UCLouvain.

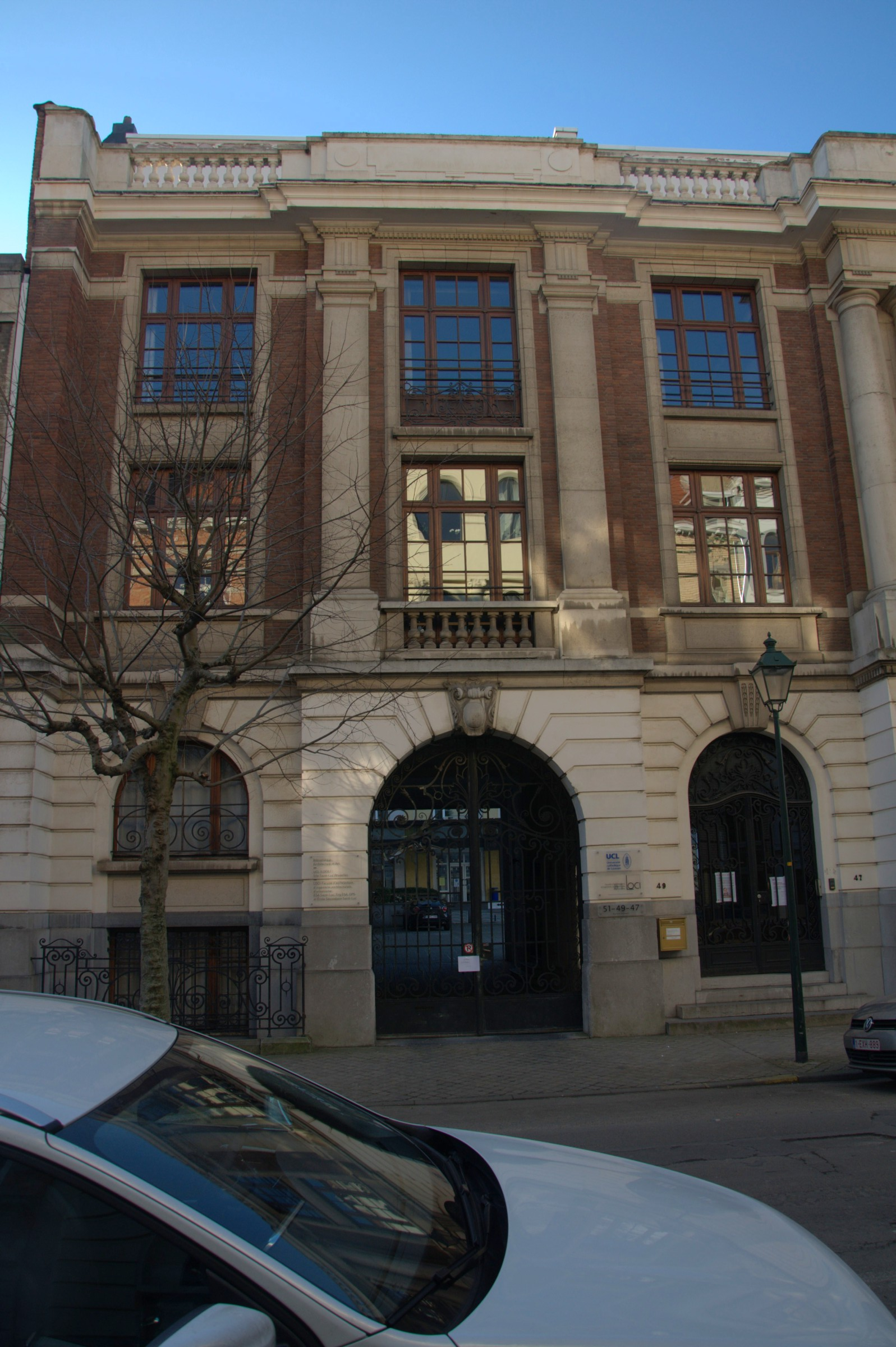
UCLouvain Brussels Saint-Gilles, rue Wafelaerts 51 (left wing).

The Wallonia-Brussels Federation decree of 13 December 2007 grants universities the right to organise studies in the field of architecture, only if they incorporate one or more architecture schools (ISA, Instituts supérieurs d'architecture, which were a separate type of institutions of higher education, next to universities, colleges and schools of arts). In 2010, ISA Saint-Luc left the Saint-Luc Institutes of Brussels to merge by absorption within the University of Louvain. During its first year within UCLouvain, the newly established LOCI Faculty kept settled in the ISA Saint-Luc buildings on the Chaussée de Charleroi. As soon as the merger was completed, a brand new campus was opened, still in Saint-Gilles and the neighbourhood of the Instituts Saint-Luc, called UCLouvain Bruxelles Saint-Gilles, located at rue Wafelaerts, next to the Saint-Gilles prison. The new buildings constitute the former Sanders Pharmaceutical Laboratories, designed in the Beaux-Arts style in 1927 and listed as protected on Brussels' regional heritage list since 1996.

The UCLouvain Brussels Saint-Gilles campus has its own administration including a vice-dean and library (BAIU-Brussels).

=== Tournai ===
The Institut Saint-Luc de Tournai was founded in 1878 in front of the Notre-Dame Cathedral of Tournai (in what is now the Brothers of Tournai school) as a drawing school, together with the Saint-Grégoire music school, intended for the teaching of church organ. In what was at the time the independent commune of Ramegnies-Chin, the Passy-Froyennes Institute was founded in 1904, with a vast new neo-Gothic building that still houses Saint-Luc Tournai today. In fact, it was the transfer to Belgium, but very near the French border, of a boarding school founded in 1839 by the Brothers of the Christian Schools in Passy (now in Paris), following the Combes Law of 1904. The Institut Saint-Luc de Lille also had to close its doors and some of its assets were also transferred to Tournai, 25 km away. The Institute was legally founded as a non-profit ASBL in 1924.

By 1936, the school, mainly an architecture school, had 500 students. Architecture courses were also held in downtown Tournai, rue de la Tête d'Or and rue du Chambge, up until the Second World War. The French De La Salle brothers lived at the institute, almost in exile, until 1959, when they returned to France to found the La Salle Passy Buzenval collège, one of Paris' most prestigious secondary schools. The institute's management was then taken back by the brotherhood of Saint-Luc. Over time, the Institut des hautes études des communications sociales communication school (IHECS, now in the city of Brussels) and the bases of the Institut des Arts de Diffusion cinema school (IAD, now in Louvain-la-Neuve) were both founded at Saint-Luc Tournai.

Similarly to Brussels, an organizing committee of the Institut St-Luc de Tournai had been made responsible for the centralized management of secondary school, art school, architecture school and schools of continued and specialized education, since 1955. From 1979 onwards, architecture has been taught within the Institut supérieur d'Architecture Saint-Luc de Tournai (Ramegnies-Chin), holding the statute of an independent school of architecture.

In 1982, a research institute called Études et Recherches architecturales de l'ISA (abbreviated ERA) was set up, which carried out research in architecture and urban planning in Tournai until it became integrated UCLouvain.

Since 1987, the Institut supérieur d'architecture Saint-Luc de Liège and Institut supérieur d'architecture Saint-Luc de Tournai had been grouped together within one same legal entity, the Saint-Luc de Wallonie Higher Institute of Architecture, a non-profit ASBL with notably Melchior Wathelet on its board of directors.

The Wallonia-Brussels Federation decree of 13 December 2007 grants universities the right to organise studies in the field of architecture, only if they incorporate one or more architecture schools. The same year, ISA Saint-Luc Tournai initiated discussions to integrate the University of Louvain, as well as discussions with institutions located in France, given its large capital of French students. In 2009, the association I.S.A. St-Luc Wallonie was dissolved, transferring the ISA Saint-Luc de Liège to the University of Liège, and the ISA Saint-Luc de Tournai to the Université catholique de Louvain. The Faculty of Architecture of UCLouvain was thus created and continued to teach architecture within the complex of the Chaussée de Tournai in Ramegnies-Chin. However, like in Brussels, the university started establishing plans for an independent and proper architecture campus in the Tournai city-center.

In 2012, the UCLouvain took over the Hôtel des Anciens Prêtres building (now the Hôtel des Architectes, which currently houses the administrative services), bought from the city of Tournai, as well as a former building of the State Archives in Tournai (Archives), which itself had moved to the former site of the Casterman printing house in 2010. UCLouvain also decided buy the adjacent site belonging to Cofidis (currently the Manufacture and Filature Buildings). Portuguese architectural firm Aires Mateus was appointed to design the new site, including the construction of a deconstructivist connecting building.

In 2017, the Tournai campus of the University of Louvain was inaugurated, with its main entrance located rue du Glategnies.

As in Brussels, the UCLouvain Tournai campus has its own administration including a vice-dean and library (BAIU-Tournai).

=== Louvain-la-Neuve ===
==== Beginnings in Louvain ====
The Catholic University of Louvain has been offering engineering degrees in Louvain (Leuven) since 1964, within the so-called Écoles speciales or Special Schools, part of the Faculty of Sciences. The Special School of Architecture was one of the last to be founded, with the Special School of Electricity. The Écoles spéciales moved to the Arenberg Castle in Heverlee, in the suburbs of Louvain, between 1925 and 1931.

The School of Urban and Regional Planning (URBA), whose structure within the faculty has remained intact since then, was founded in 1961. The same year, the Écoles spéciales merged into the Faculty of Applied Sciences (Faculté des sciences appliquées, FSA), as an entity which for the first time was independent from the Faculty of Science. The Faculty was linguistically separated in 1964 into the Dutch-speaking Faculteit ingenieurswetenschappen and the francophone Faculté des sciences appliquées. Together with the other civil engineering students, architectural engineering students were the first to move to the new city of Louvain-la-Neuve following the split of the Catholic University of Louvain in 1968. In 1971, the French-speaking programmes of the Faculty of Applied Sciences were still offered on the Heverlee campus. From 1973, the programs for the last three years of civil engineering were given at the new Louvain-la-Neuve site, while the candidature degrees (undergraduate) were still being taught at Heverlee. In 1975, the entire Faculty of Applied Sciences (FSA) of the UCL was established in Louvain-la-Neuve. The students from the faculty were the first students (and residents) of the city of Louvain-la-Neuve.

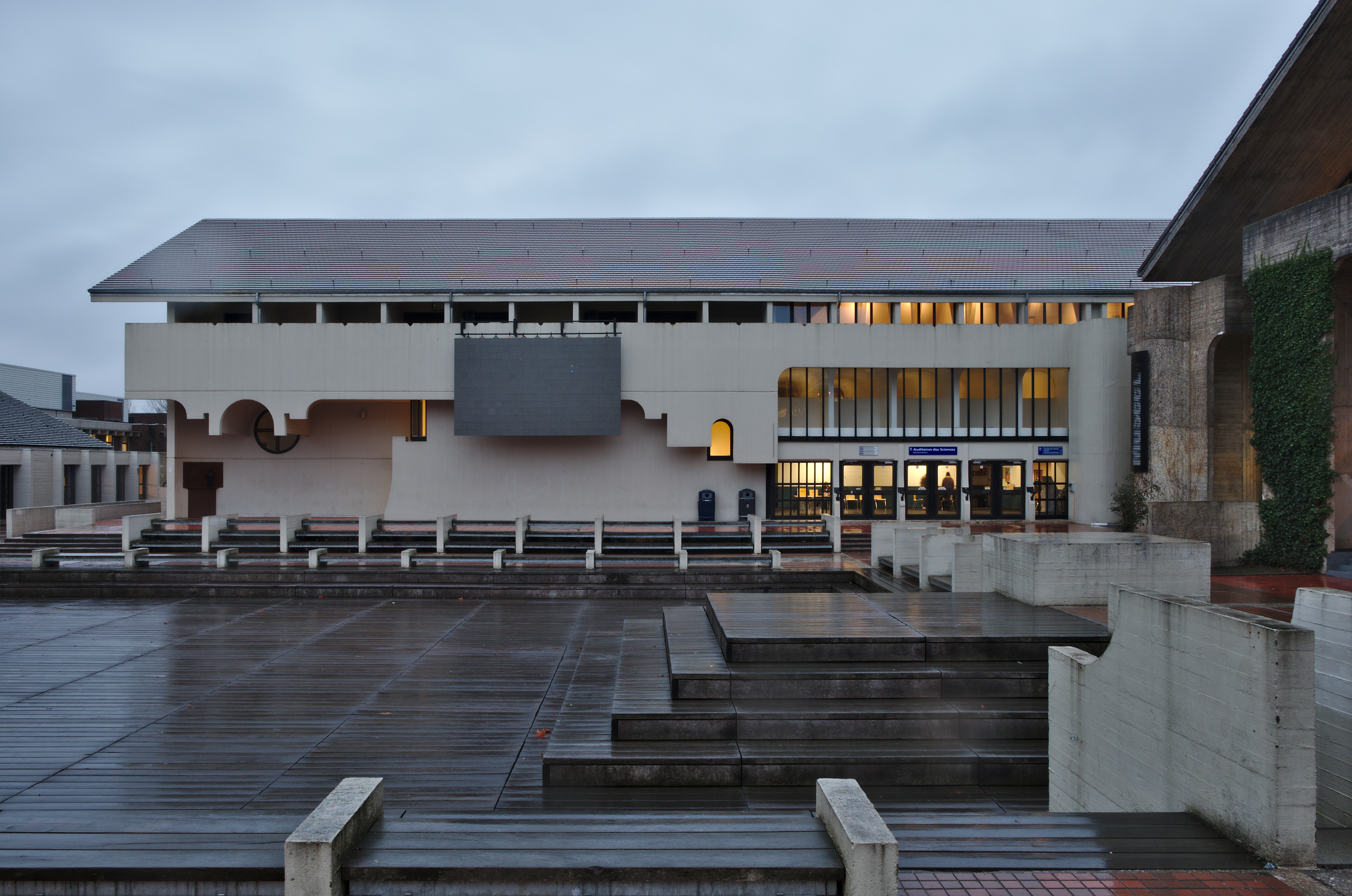
Auditoires des Sciences in Louvain-la-Neuve, partly hosting LOCI in the city.

In 1983, Émile Verhaegen, President of the ISA Saint-Luc Bruxelles, founded the Centre de Recherche et d'Enseignement de l'Architecture U.C.L. - Saint-Luc research center, abbreviated CREARCH, in Louvain-la-Neuve.

With the creation of the new Faculty of Architecture, Architectural Engineering and Urban Planning in 2009, the Department of architectural civil engineering was transferred from the Louvain School of Engineering to the new LOCI faculty. The deanship and the central administrative headquarters of LOCI are located in Louvain-la-Neuve, in buildings still shared with the School of Engineering.

== See also ==
- Louvain School of Engineering
- Université catholique de Louvain
