= Arenberg Research-Park =

Coordinates: 50.865°N 4.669°E

The Arenberg Research-Park is a science park founded by the KU Leuven in 2004. The science park is in the immediate vicinity of the Arenberg campus of the university in Heverlee (Belgium), UZ Leuven campus Gasthuisberg and IMEC. The park is 13 hectares and consists of different cluster-areas, with amongst others a bio-incubator for spin-offs of the university and space for companies active in research and development.

== Usage ==
The bio-incubator housing is the prime of the biotech & pharmaceutical spin-offs of the KU Leuven university. Bio-incubator Leuven offers 40,000 sq. ft., but expansions to 80,000 sq. ft. is currently ongoing. Today it houses startups like Aelin Therapeutics, miDiagnostics, Antleron, scaleups like reMYND and Nasdaq-listed companies like Oxurion. In addition, translational and innovative research activity such as the centre for drug design & discovery (CD3) are active on premises.

The development of the site is by private entrepreneurship in the Leuven region, and the buildings themselves have been sponsored with grants by the Flemish region and Europe (EFRO-support).

== See also ==
- Science and technology in Flanders
- Haasrode Research-Park

== Sources ==
- Eerstesteenlegging Wetenschapspark Leuven-Arenberg (Dutch)
- Auditeur keurt Wetenschapspark af - Raad van State buigt zich opnieuw over de ontwikkeling van Wetenschapspark Arenberg (Dutch)
- Vlaams en Europees geld voor hightech (Dutch)
- KU laat grond op wetenschapspark Arenberg saneren (Dutch)
- Heverlee Bedrijven wachten niet op verdict Raad van State over Arenberg (Dutch)
- Leuven krijgt tweede bio-incubator (Dutch)
