= St John Berchmans University College, Heverlee =

College of theology in Leuven, Belgium

Coordinates: 50.858844°N 4.685913°E

St John Berchmans University College
- Jezuietenhuis
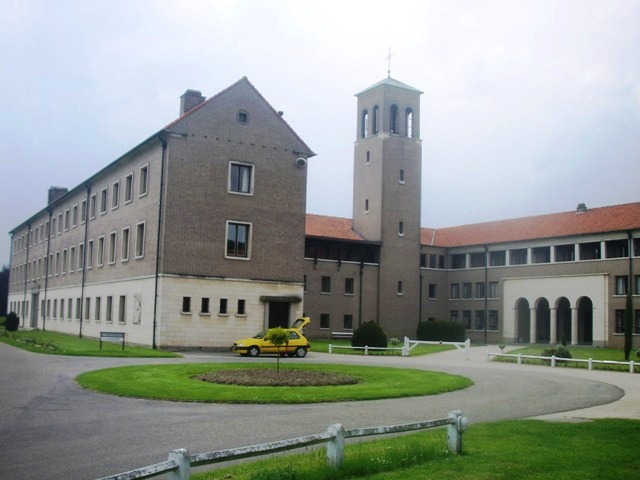
- Type: College of philosophy and theology
- Established: 1958; 68 years ago
- Religious affiliation: Roman Catholic (Jesuit)
- Location: Waversebaan 220 3001 Heverlee, Leuven, Belgium
- Website: Jezuietenhuis.be

St John Berchmans University College, locally known as Jezuietenhuis or Lerkeveld, is an educational institution run by the European Low Countries Province of the Society of Jesus in Heverlee, outside Leuven. It was built in 1958 by Jos Ritzen, who worked with Alphons Boosten. It began as a philosophy and theology college for the Jesuits and housed their archives.

== History ==
=== Foundation ===
In the 19th century, the Jesuits had a building in Egenhoven outside Heverlee. It was a country estate and served as a training college for the Jesuits. The Jesuits also had premises which are now the Evangelical Theological Faculty in Heverlee. These two sites originally served as the philosophy and theological college for all the Jesuits in Belgium. Plans were made in 1931 to have one college for the French-speaking Jesuits and another separate one for the Flemish-speaking Jesuits. In 1935, these plans had not materialised and when the Jesuits created separate administrative units (or provinces) for the Flemish-speaking Jesuits and the French-speaking Jesuits, they both still shared the building.

=== Construction ===
In 1953, a site was found for the construction of the college, and the architect Jos Ritzen was contracted to design it. He had previously worked with Alphons Boosten. Together, they built churches in Maastricht and Eygelshoven in the early 1920s. Building work stated on 31 July 1956, and it was completed in June 1958. The cost escalated during construction and on completion it was BEF72 million, which in 2010 would be €11 million. As the French-speaking Jesuits had one tall building on one side of the River Dijle and the Flemish-speaking Jesuits had another on the other side of the river, students there would refer to the two buildings as the 'Two Towers'.

=== Expansion ===
In the 1960s, vocations to religious life fell dramatically in the Catholic church and they had to expand the building's usage. The building still contained the Jesuit archives, but it was adapted to contain a conference centre, a Jesuit retirement home and a student hostel. The Lerkeveld Student Hostel provides accommodation and study space for students of the Katholieke Universiteit Leuven. The archive contains documents such as ones about education in the schools run by the Jesuits in the 16th, 17th, and 18th centuries. In 2004, the Flemish Jesuits moved 15,000 books of a collection called 'Jesuitica and Ignatiana' to the Maurits Sabbe Library of the Faculty of Theology and Religious Studies of the Katholieke Universiteit Leuven.

== Parish ==
The Jesuit community there also serve the local Catholic population by regularly celebrating Mass. The nearby St. Lambert Church in Heverlee closed from 2013 to 2014, so the only Mass being celebrated was at the Jezuitenhuis. There, Mass is at 6:30pm from Monday to Friday and at 9:00am on Sunday.

== See also ==
- List of Jesuit sites
- Society of Jesus
