= Ad Wouters =

Dutch sculptor

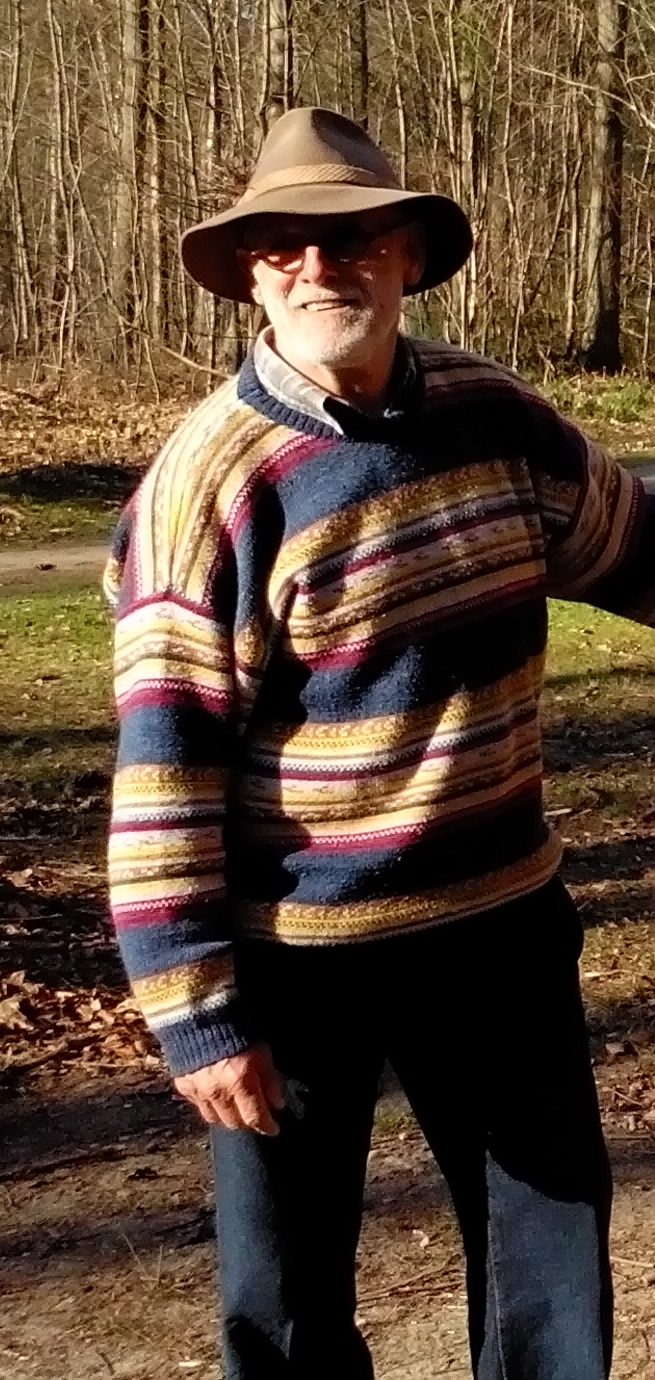
Ad Wouters in 2014

Ad Wouters (born 1944) is a sculptor, born in the Netherlands, who is active in Belgium in Leuven and the forest south of it. Wouters is known for his oak wood sculptures.

== Biography ==
Wouters was born in Dordrecht. Starting at the age of 13, he worked in construction. At the age of 22 he traveled to Africa with the Belgian NGO Bouworde. After his stay in Africa, he went to live in Haasrode in Belgium, where he learned the skill of restoring buildings. Due to a work-related accident, where he fell from a church tower in the 1990s he became unfit for this kind of work. From then on he developed himself as an artist.

== Style ==
Wouters creates wood sculptures, mostly from oak tree trunks or from other recovered materials. He created his first wood sculpture accessible to the public, De Bosprotter commissioned by the forestry services of Meerdaal forest in the year 2000. He created several other sculptures since then.

== Ad's itinerary ==
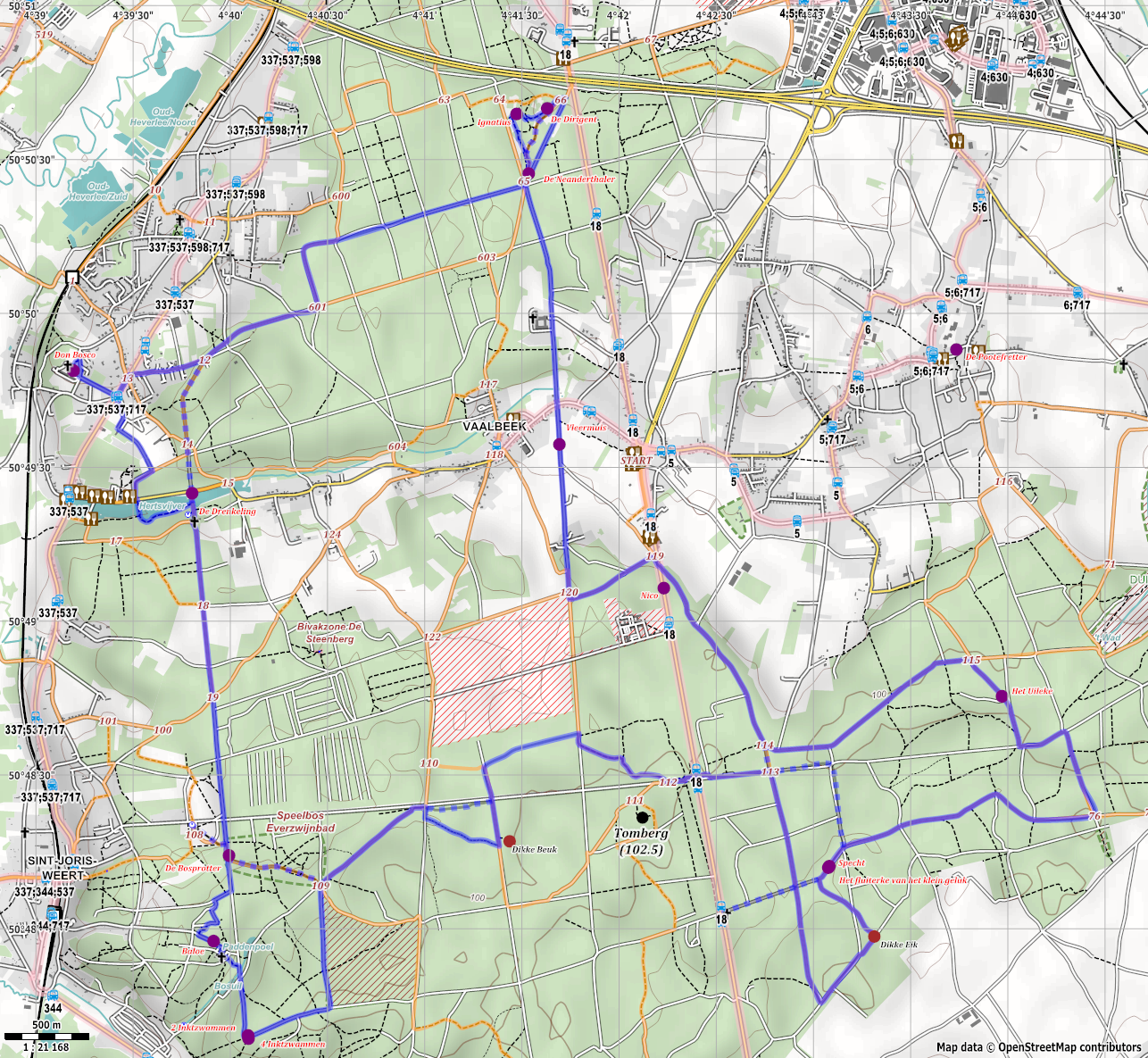
Map of Ad's itinerary

There is a path of 25 km one can take to march or cycle past most of Wouters' works through the woods of Heverlee and Meerdaal.

=== Ad's itinerary leads past ===
- Ignatius (2008)
- The director (2007)
- The Neanderthal man (2008)
- Bat (2006)
- The owl (2003)
- Woodpecker (2007)
- Inky cap (2007)
- Baloo (2010)
- The Bosprotter (2000)
- Drowned (2014)
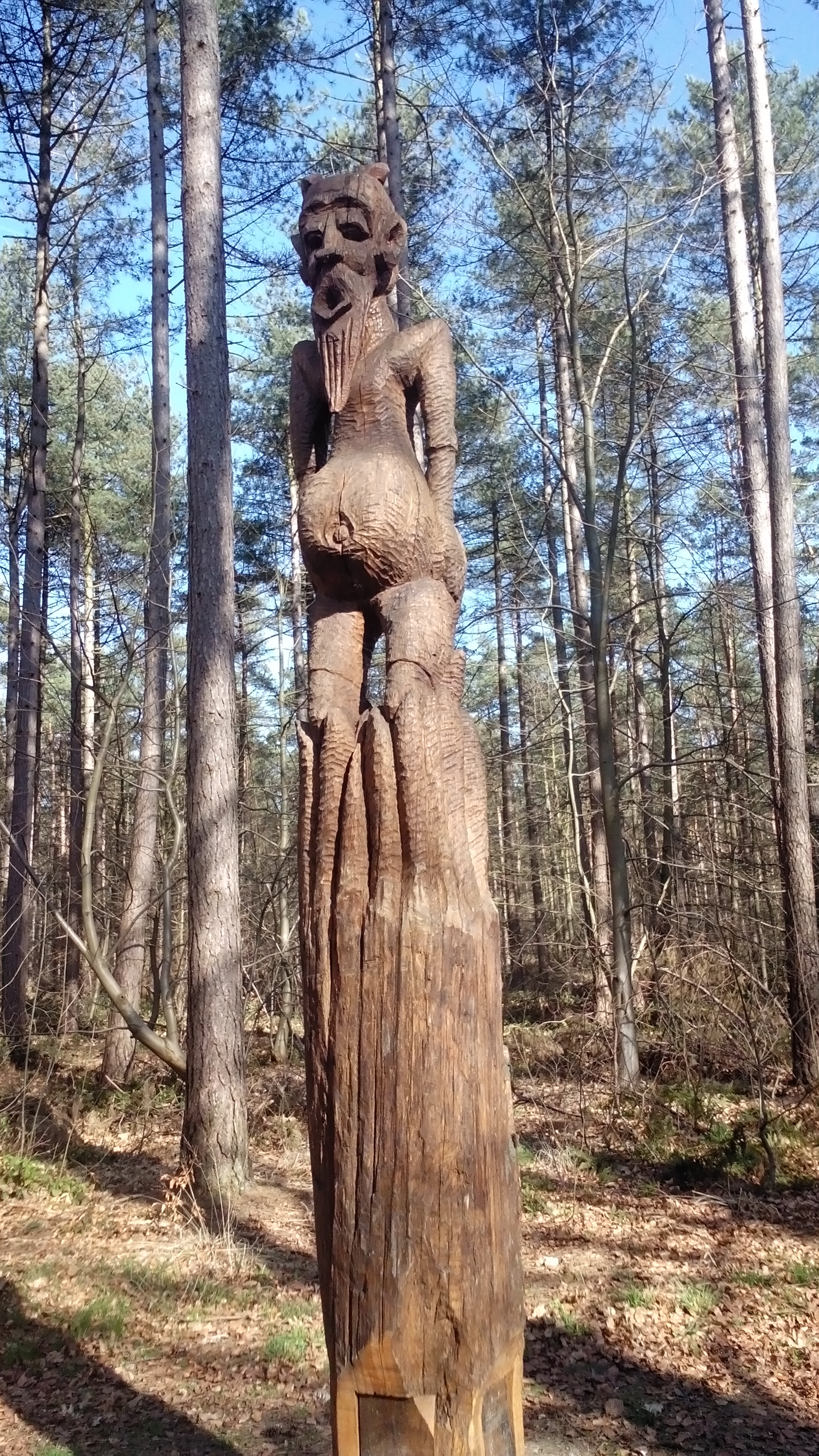
The Bosprotter (2000)

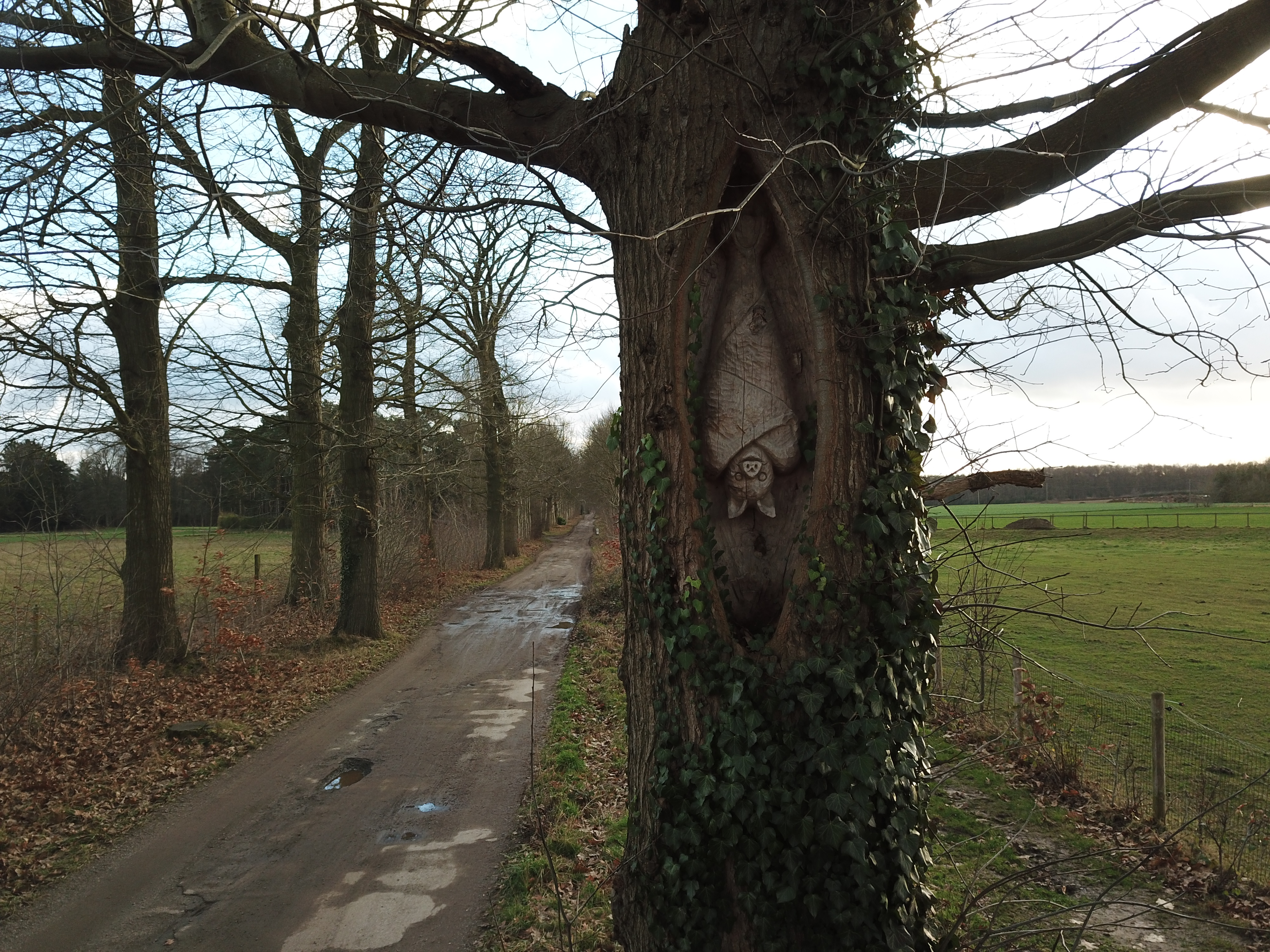
Bat (2006)

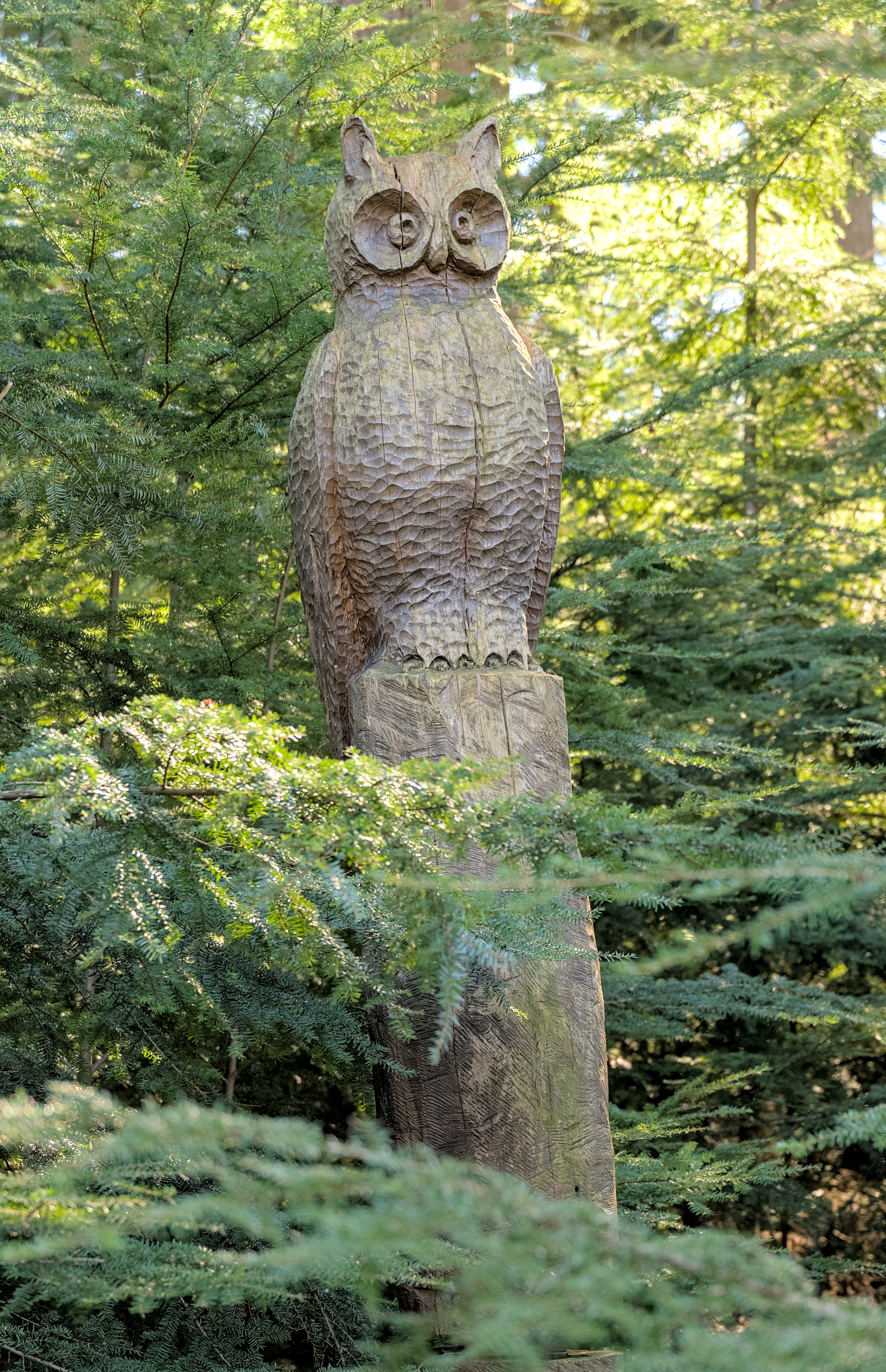
Ignatius (2008)

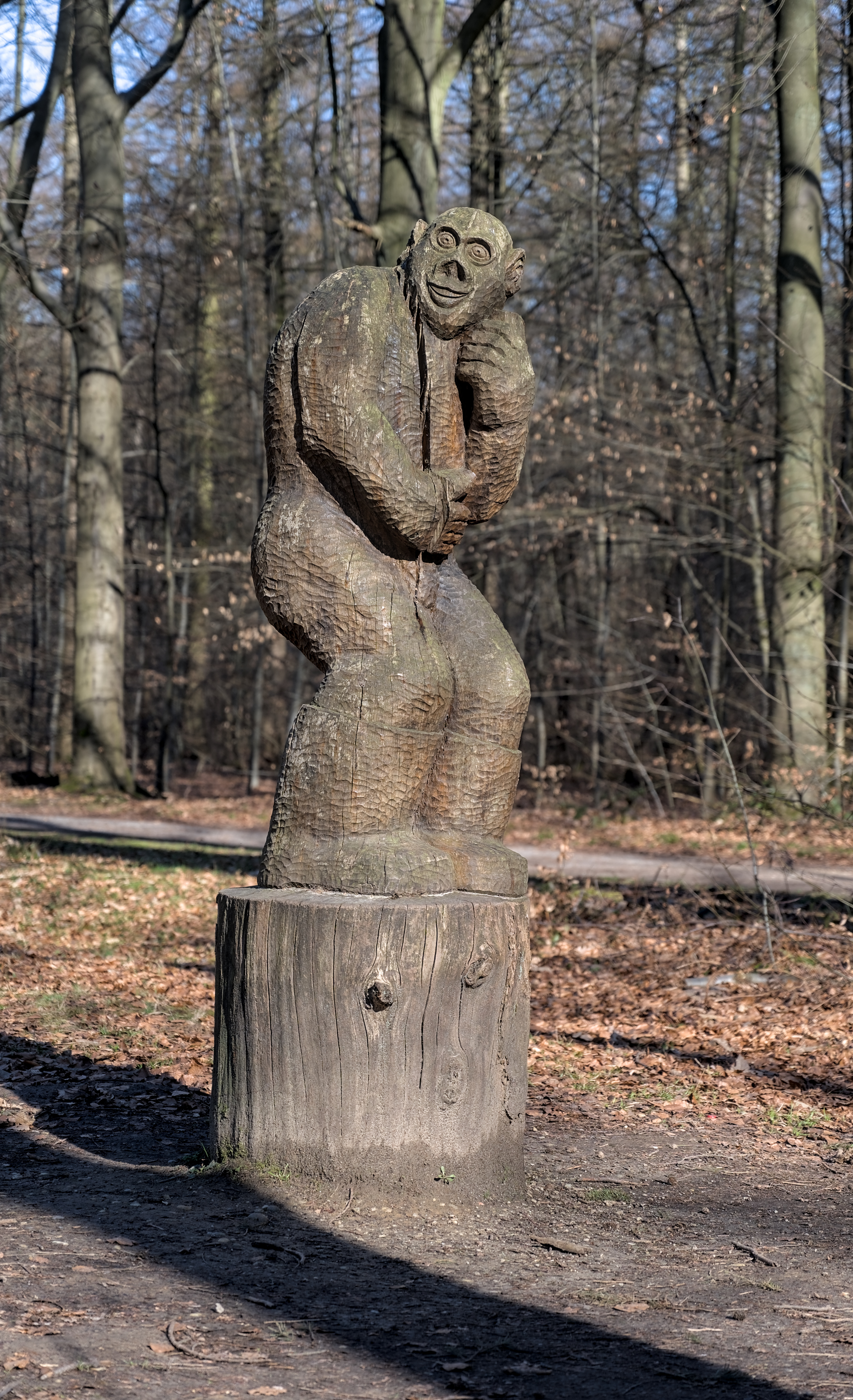
De Neanderthaler (2008)

== List of other works on display ==
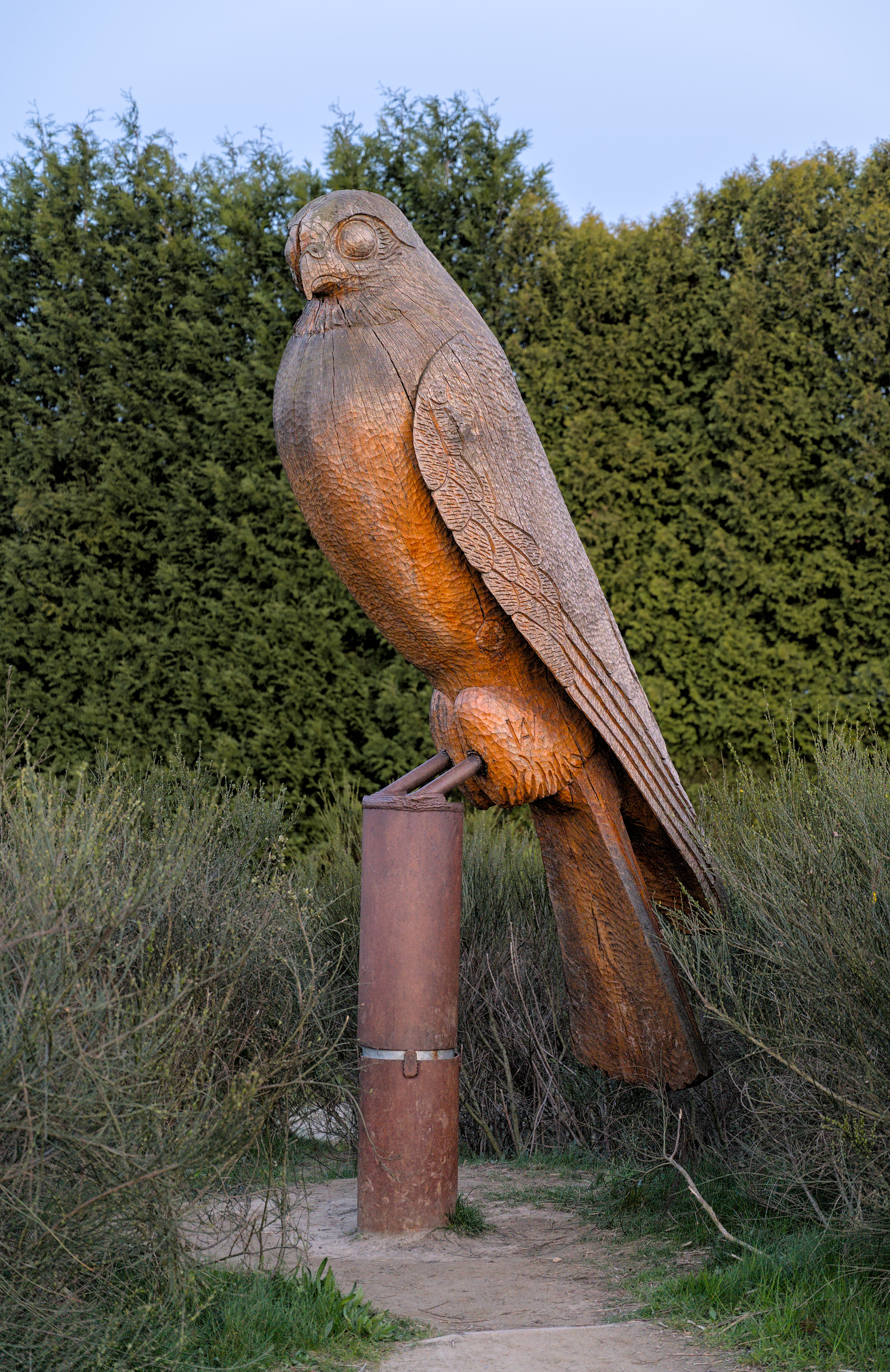
Common kestrel

- Pootefretter (man eating carrot, which is the colloquial nickname for people from Haasrode) (1999), bronze statue in front of the community school of Haasrode
- Saint Michael (2009), brass statue in the Church of Saint Michael Leuven
- The Prophet (2012), wooden sculpture in the Sint-Donatus Park Leuven
- Arum lily wooden sculpture located in the orangerie of the Botanical garden of Leuven
- Drowned (2014), artwork made of litter, to symbolise how we are drowning in our own waste, located in Oud-Heverlee between the ponds.
- Voor hen van toen, stone to commemorate the volunteers of natural reserve Doode Bemde. It's right next to a bridge of the now defunct tramway line.
