= Haasrode, Leuven =

Suburb of the city of Leuven, Belgium

Haasrode
- Part of Leuven
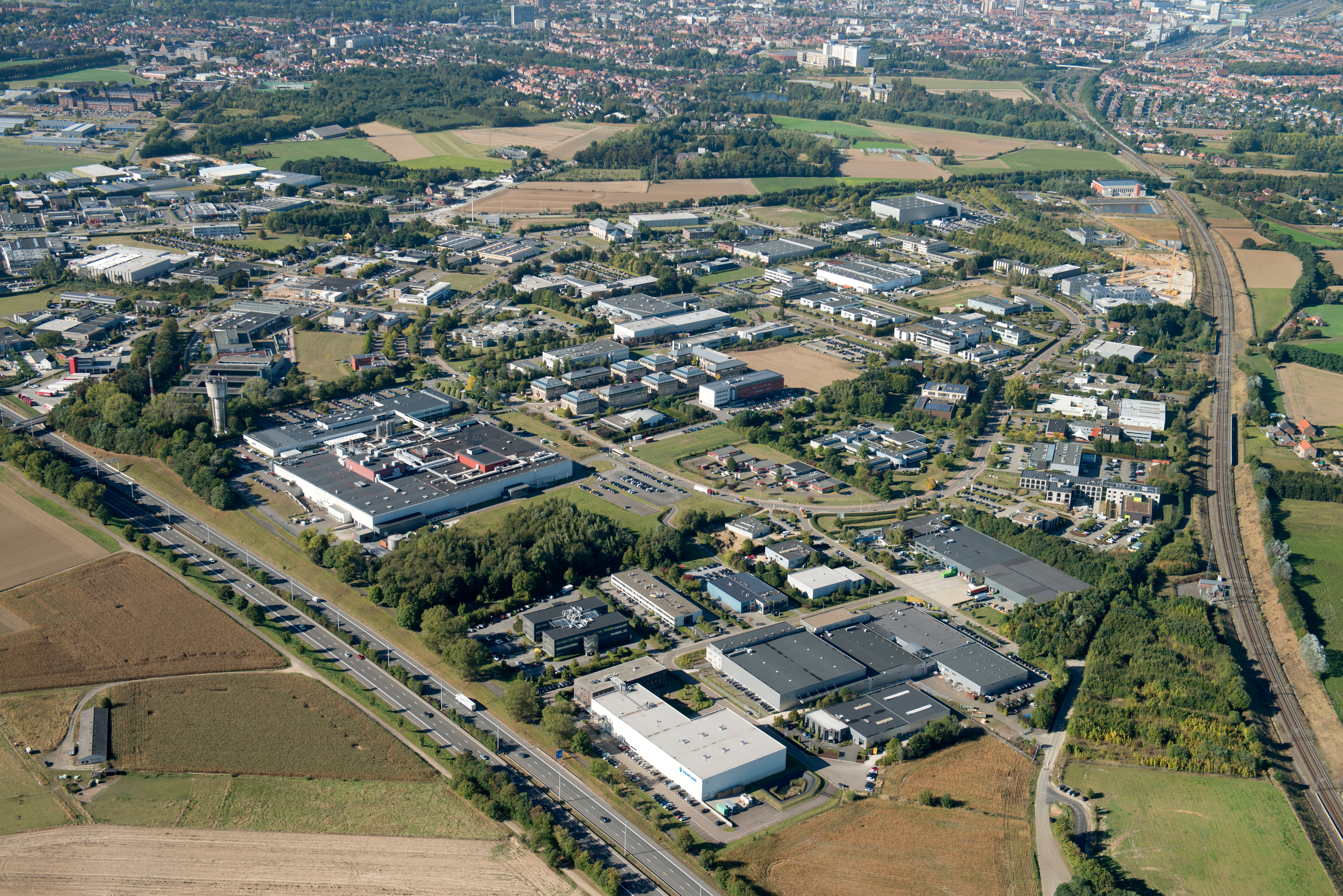
- Aerial view of Haasrode Research-Park
- Interactive map of Haasrode
- Location within Belgium Location within Flemish Brabant
- Coordinates: 50°51′01″N 4°43′50″E
- Country: Belgium
- Community: Flemish Community
- Region: Flemish Region
- Province: Flemish Brabant
- Arrondissement: Leuven
- Municipality: Leuven
- Postal codes: 3001
- Area codes: 016

The northern part of the former municipality of Haasrode (Dutch pronunciation: [ˈɦaːsroːdə]) is now a part of the city of Leuven, Belgium. According to the official website of Leuven, Haasrode is a part of the sub-municipality of Heverlee.

In 1977, Haasrode was merged with Oud-Heverlee, Blanden, Vaalbeek and Sint-Joris-Weert to form the municipality of Oud-Heverlee. The northern part of the former municipality of Haasrode was administratively annexed to Leuven. Haasrode Research-Park is located in Leuven's Haasrode.
