= Haasrode Research-Park =

Business park in Belgium

Coordinates: 50°50′54.42″N 4°43′4.98″E

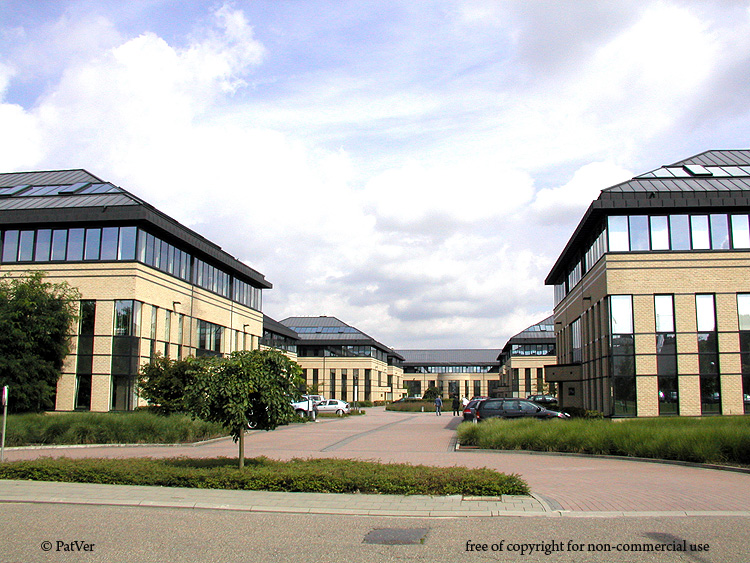
Greenhill Campus

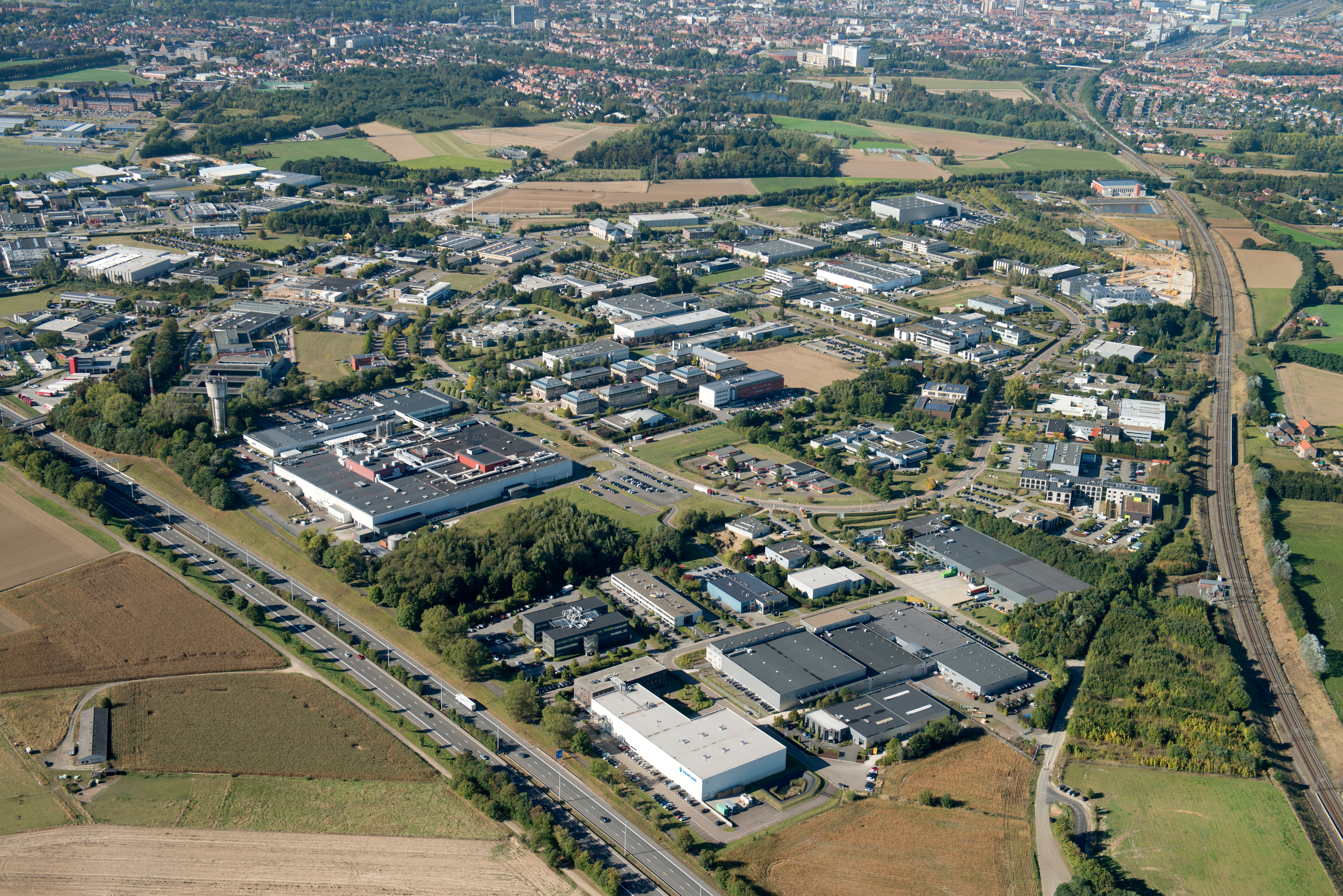
Aerial overview

The Haasrode Research-Park business and research park in Haasrode (Heverlee, Leuven, Belgium) with a total area of 136 hectares (336 acres), accommodates dozens of high-technology businesses, employing well over 5,000 people in total. International companies such as Siemens, Terumo, KLA Corporation, 3D Systems, Tomra, Nikon, Sony, NXP,... have important, often research oriented branches in Leuven. Next to these multinational companies, there are tens of innovative (KU Leuven) spin-off companies like Materialise, Easics, LAB Motion Systems, Soundtalks, The Kobi Company, Octinion,... as the nearby presence of the internationally renowned KU Leuven university (Europe's most innovative University) and UCLL generates a continuous flow of highly innovative companies. The park is located near the Brussels area and is very well connected to the airport. Divided in a research and science park and a business-production park, it houses an important variety of industries. Companies are attracted by the international research centre Interuniversity Microelectronics Centre, UZ Leuven, one of the largest academic hospitals in Europe and the KU Leuven university.

== Accessibility ==
The Haasrode Research-Park is located alongside the E40 highway (Brussels-Liège, exit 23). Moreover, very regular buses connect the science park to the city centre and the Leuven train station in particular, can be reached within 10–15 minutes. The park will soon be connected by a new (E-)bike highway-corridor linking Leuven to the city of Tienen and soon a direct connection via train is to be realised as this project is in advanced planning stage.
