= Meerdaal =

Coordinates: 50°48′16.89″N 4°41′45.71″E

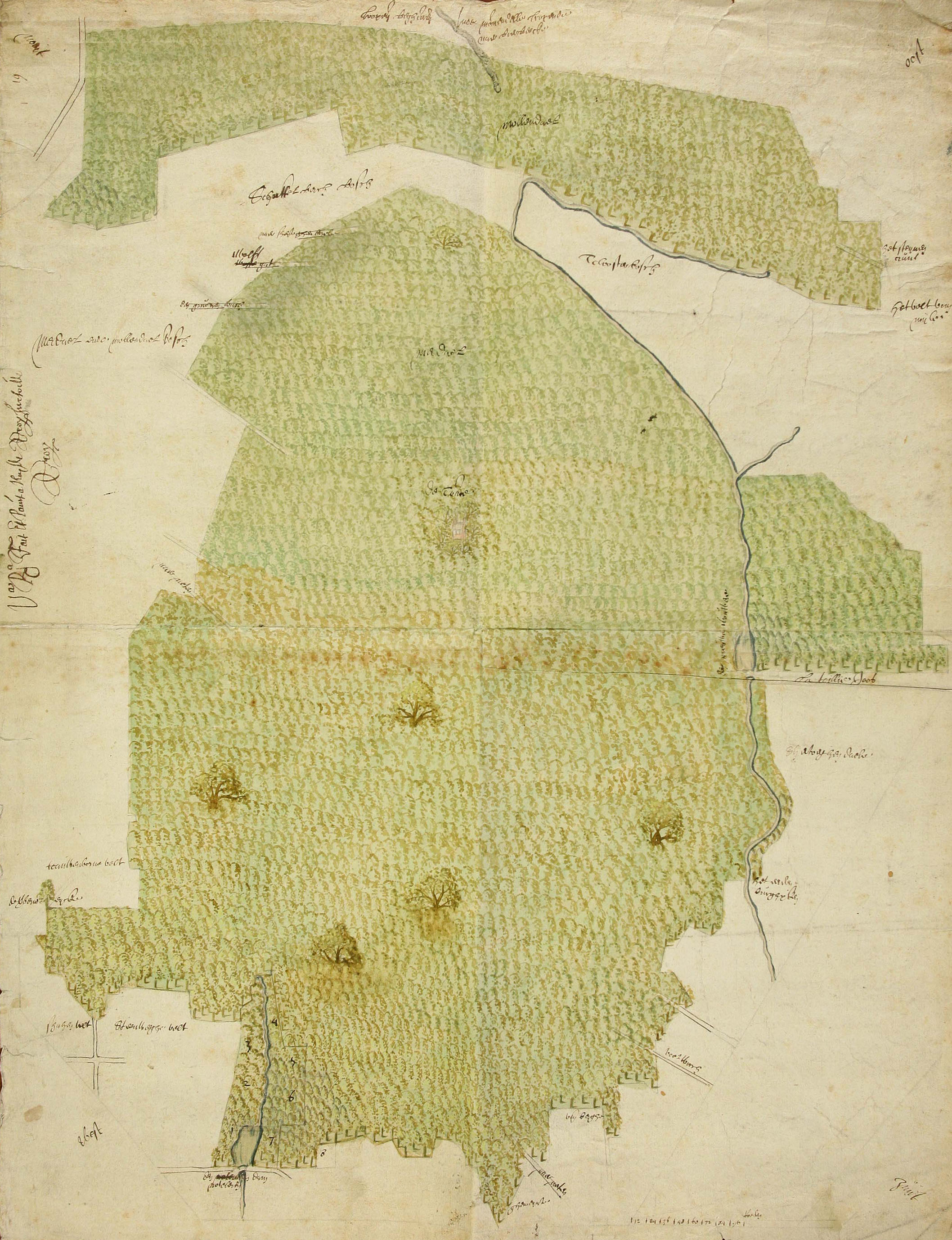
The Meerdaal Free Wood on a late sixteenth century map

Meerdaal, also known as Meerdaalwoud and Meerdaalbos, is a woodland lying east of Brussels and south of Leuven, on the loess plateau of Brabant in central Belgium. The bigger part of it has most likely been continuously forested since the Middle Ages, but the archaeological record and geomorphology give evidence of a profound human influence, probably including agriculture, during the Roman era and the Iron Age.

== Miradal ==
In 1146 Meerdaal was known as silva de miradal. Silva refers to a place dominated by trees; dal refers to a valley; the origin of mira is unclear.

== Free Wood ==
From 1406 until the end of the 18th century Meerdaal was endowed with the statute of Free Wood, which, for example, refers to its independent law court and rules.

== Oak, pannage and boars ==
Numerous documents give evidence of pannage in Ducal Free Woods Like Meerdaal during the dark and cold months of the 16th, 17th and 18th century. This pannage was obviously well-adjusted to forestry, as Meerdaal kept its age-long reputation for high-quality oak timber up to the present day. Pigs were restricted to well-appointed areas and evidently kept out of young stands by swine herders, who also built wooden cages for the animals. But the Free Wood of Meerdaal was not only a place for pannage, coppice or timber. It also had to keep up a reputation as a chase, housing wild boars, their hybrids with domestic pigs, and deer.

== Modern forestry ==
Today, Meerdaal Forest is managed as a multifunctional forest. High quality timber production keeps to play an important role but is combined with the conservation of high quality nature, recreation and education.

== Hiking ==
Today, Meerdaalwoud and the adjacent Heverleebos - together covering an area of almost 25 km² - are very popular for hiking.
