= Alphons Boosten =

Dutch architect (1893–1951)

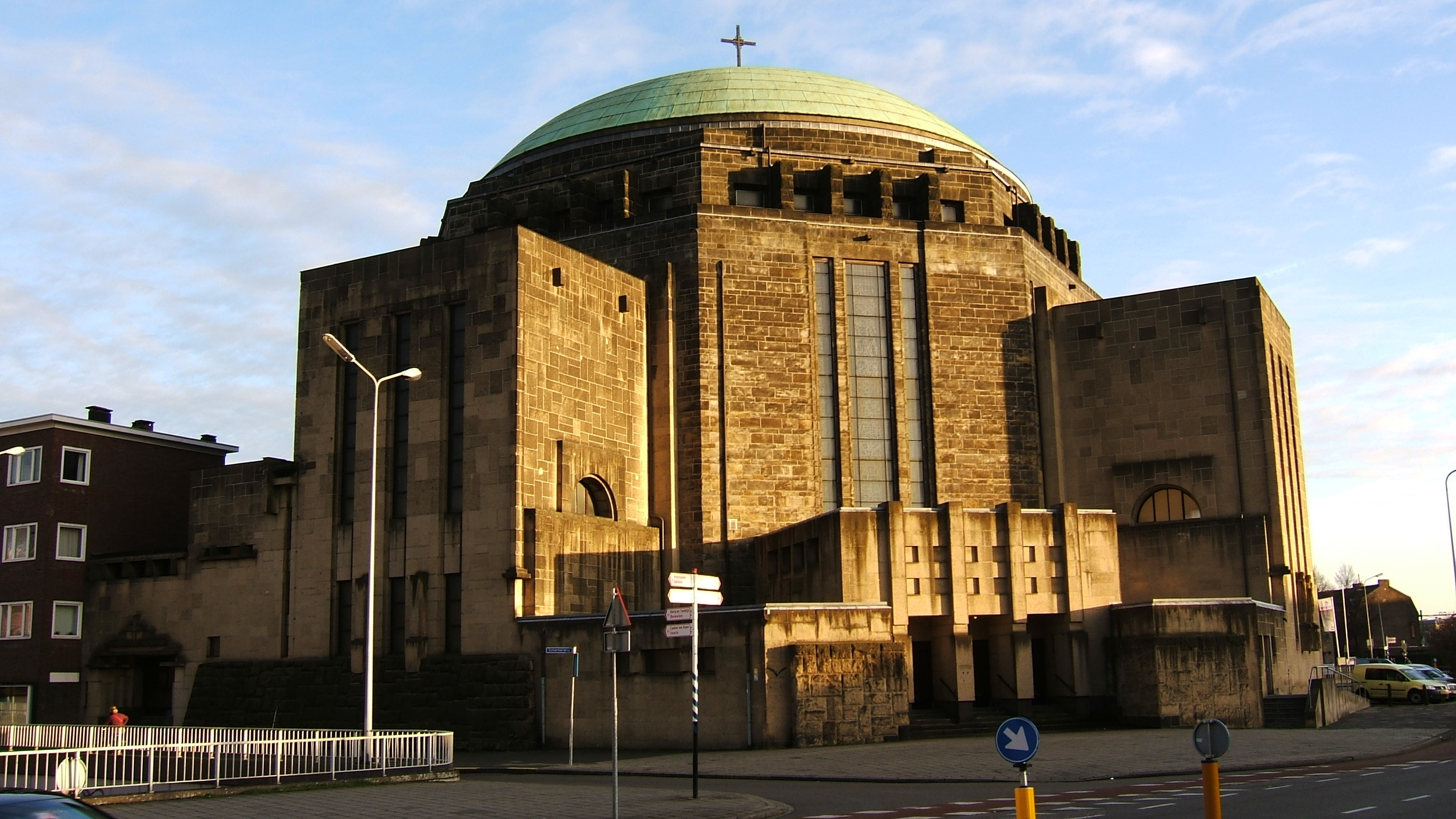
The Koepelkerk ("Cupola Church") of the Sacred Heart of Jesus, Maastricht

Alphons Boosten (20 January 1893, Maastricht – 2 January 1951) was a Dutch architect, who mostly practiced in the province of Limburg. His works include several large housing complexes and more than twenty churches.

Early in his career Boosten shortly formed a partnership with Jos Ritzen, which resulted in several houses in expressionist style, the new church of Eygelshoven and the church of the Sacred Heart of Jesus in Maastricht. Especially due to the unconventional design of the latter, the architects were not granted assignments for further churches, and Ritzen moved to Antwerp in 1924. Boosten mostly designed houses until in 1929 his career as an architect of churches resumed. Boosten's career reached a height after the Second World War, in which many churches in Limburg had been destroyed and needed replacement. However, in 1951 Boosten died, and most of his post-war assignments were completed by other architects, including his son Theo Boosten. His son worked are 'foreman' on many of his projects, one such example is the landmark gymnasium at The College Weert.
