= Heverlee =

Sub-municipality of the city of Leuven, Belgium

- Sub-municipality of Leuven
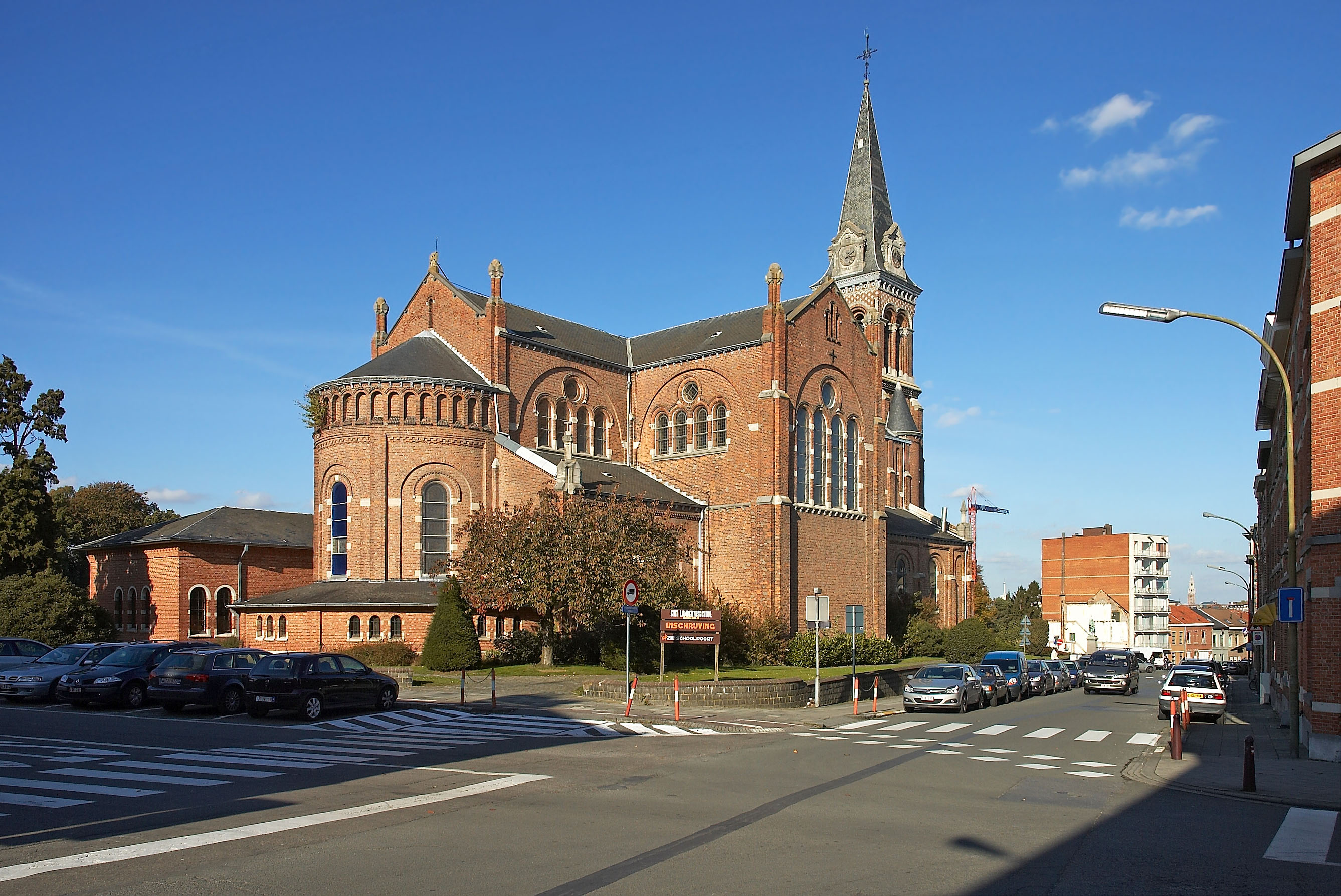
- St Lambert's Church

- Coat of arms
- Interactive map of Heverlee
- Location within Belgium Location within Flemish Brabant
- Coordinates: 50°51′36″N 4°41′23″E
- Country: Belgium
- Community: Flemish Community
- Region: Flemish Region
- Province: Flemish Brabant
- Arrondissement: Leuven
- Municipality: Leuven

Area
  - Total: 19.75 km^{2} (7.63 sq mi)

Population (2020-01-01)
  - Total: 23,555
  - Density: 1,193/km^{2} (3,089/sq mi)
- Postal codes: 3001
- Area codes: 016

Heverlee (Dutch pronunciation: [ˈɦeːvərleː]) is a sub-municipality of the city of Leuven located in the province of Flemish Brabant, Flemish Region, Belgium. It was a separate municipality until 1977. On 1 January 1977, it was merged into Leuven. According to the official website of Leuven, Haasrode is a part of Heverlee.

Heverlee is the location of the Heverlee War Cemetery for Commonwealth casualties from the Second World War.

== Education ==
Heverlee also harbours a significant part of the university campus of the Katholieke Universiteit Leuven. The Arenberg campus is the main area for research and educational facilities for exact sciences (The Science, Engineering and Technology Group). These contain the Faculty of Engineering (see Arenberg Château), the Faculty of Bioscience Engineering and the Faculty of Science. A part of the Biomedical Group, namely the Faculty of Kinesiology and Rehabilitation Sciences also has its main facilities on the campus.

The Katholieke Hogeschool Leuven is another higher education facility with some facilities in Heverlee. It lies next to the Heilig Hart-Instituut, which is a school for secondary education. Also, St John Berchmans University College, Heverlee is situated outside the centre.

== Sport ==
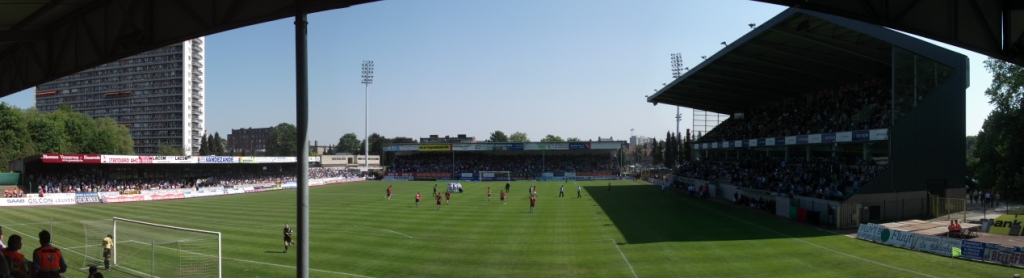
Den Dreef

Also situated in Heverlee is the Den Dreef stadium, home of the Belgian 1st Division football team Oud-Heverlee Leuven.

The Cyclocross Leuven is a cyclo-cross race held in January.

== Economy ==
Heverlee also has industrial parks with a variety of companies, some of which are affiliated (as spin-offs) with the university and its research. IMEC, Thrombogenics - now Oxurion and Materialise NV are some of the most important.

The Brabanthal is a large hall, mostly for recreational events.

== Gallery ==
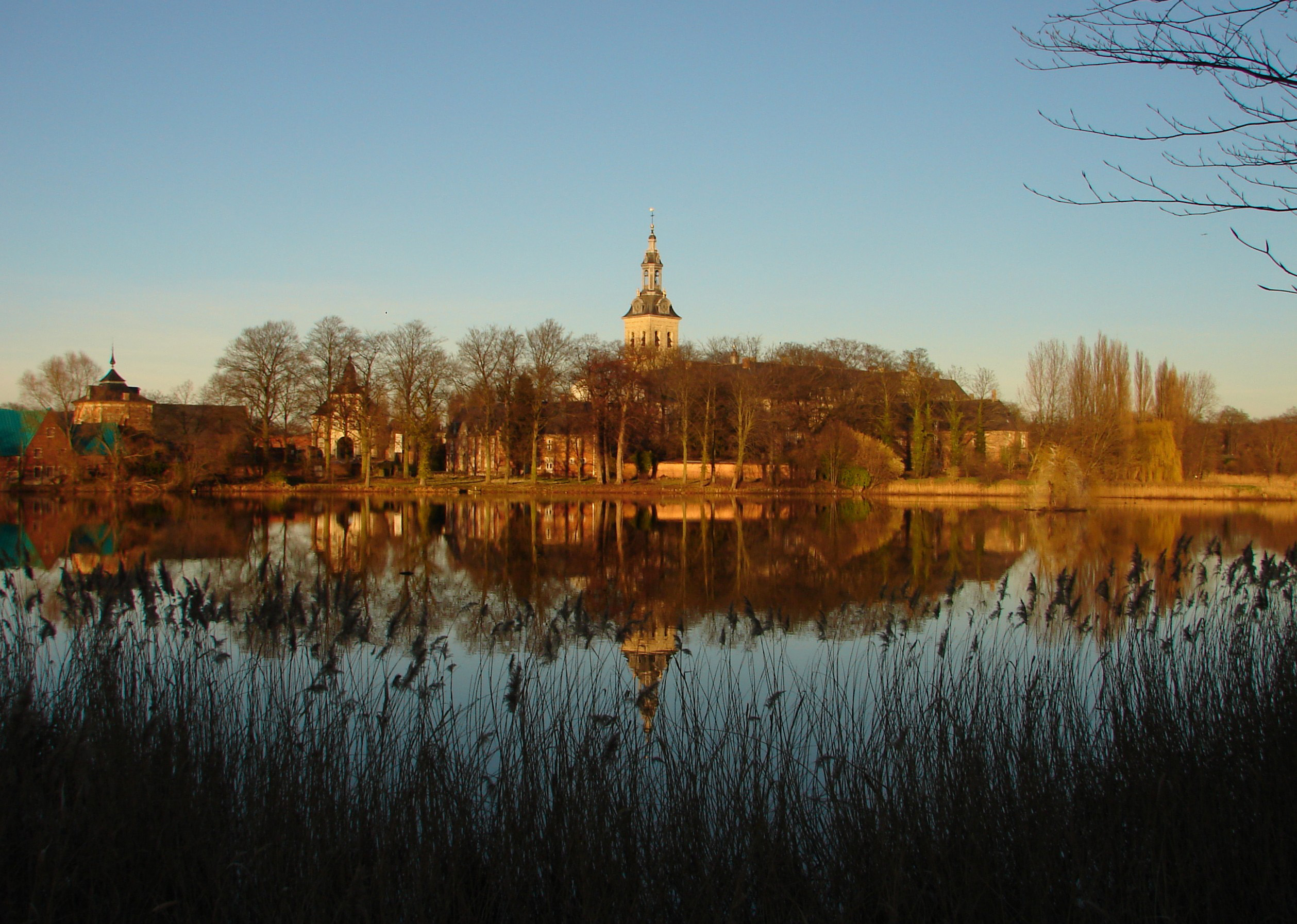
Park Abbey

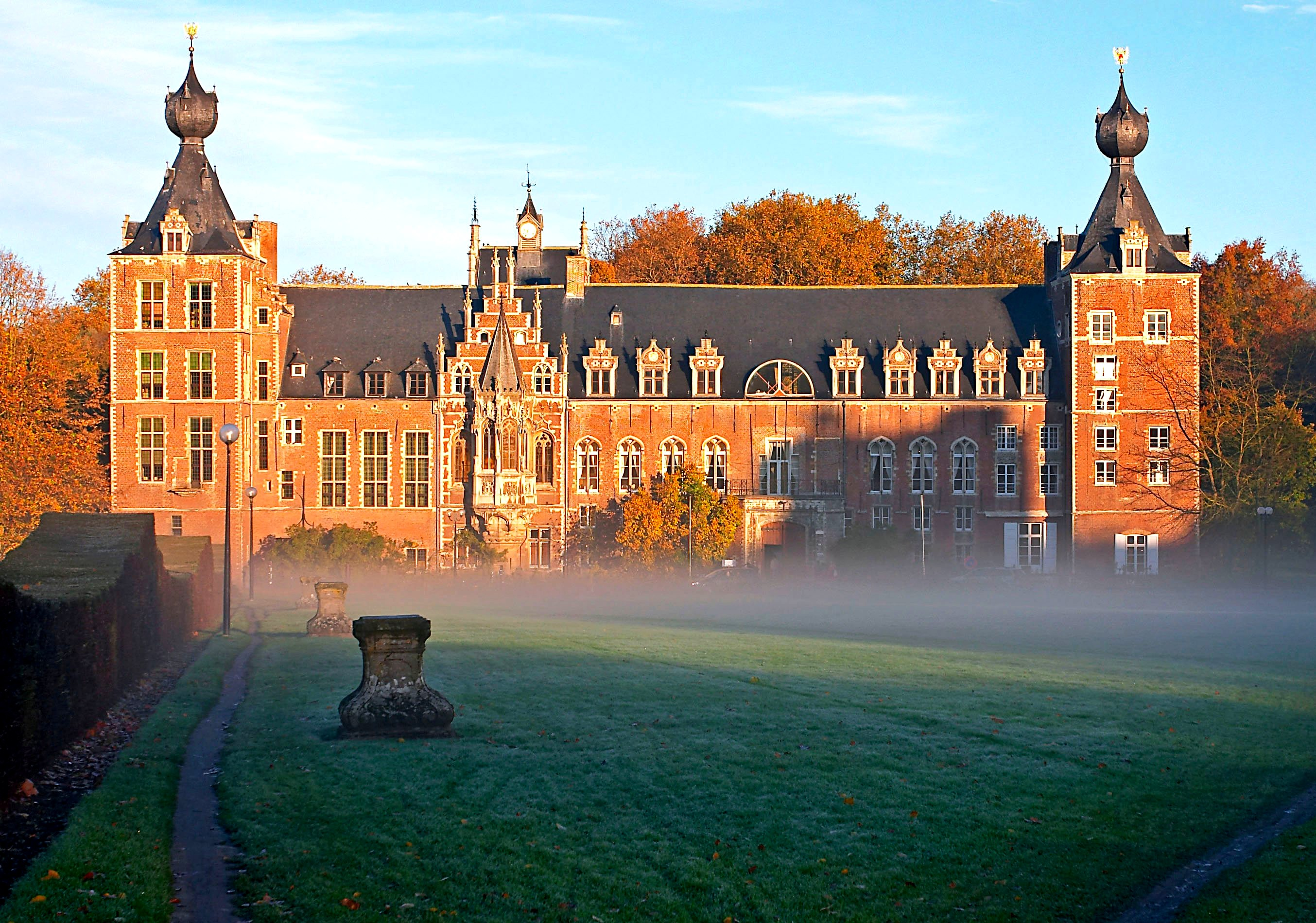
Castle Arenberg, Katholieke Universiteit Leuven

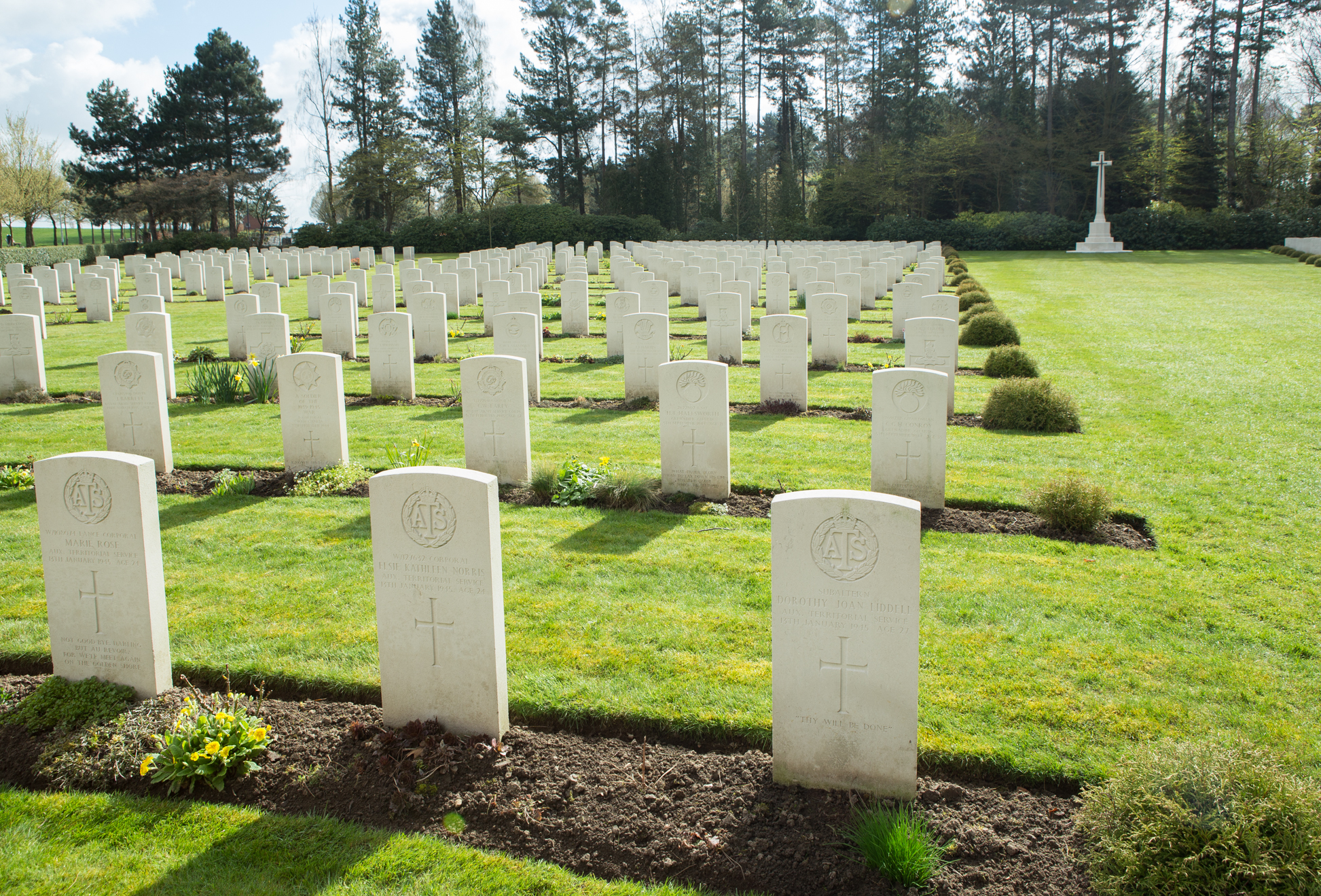
Heverlee War Cemetery

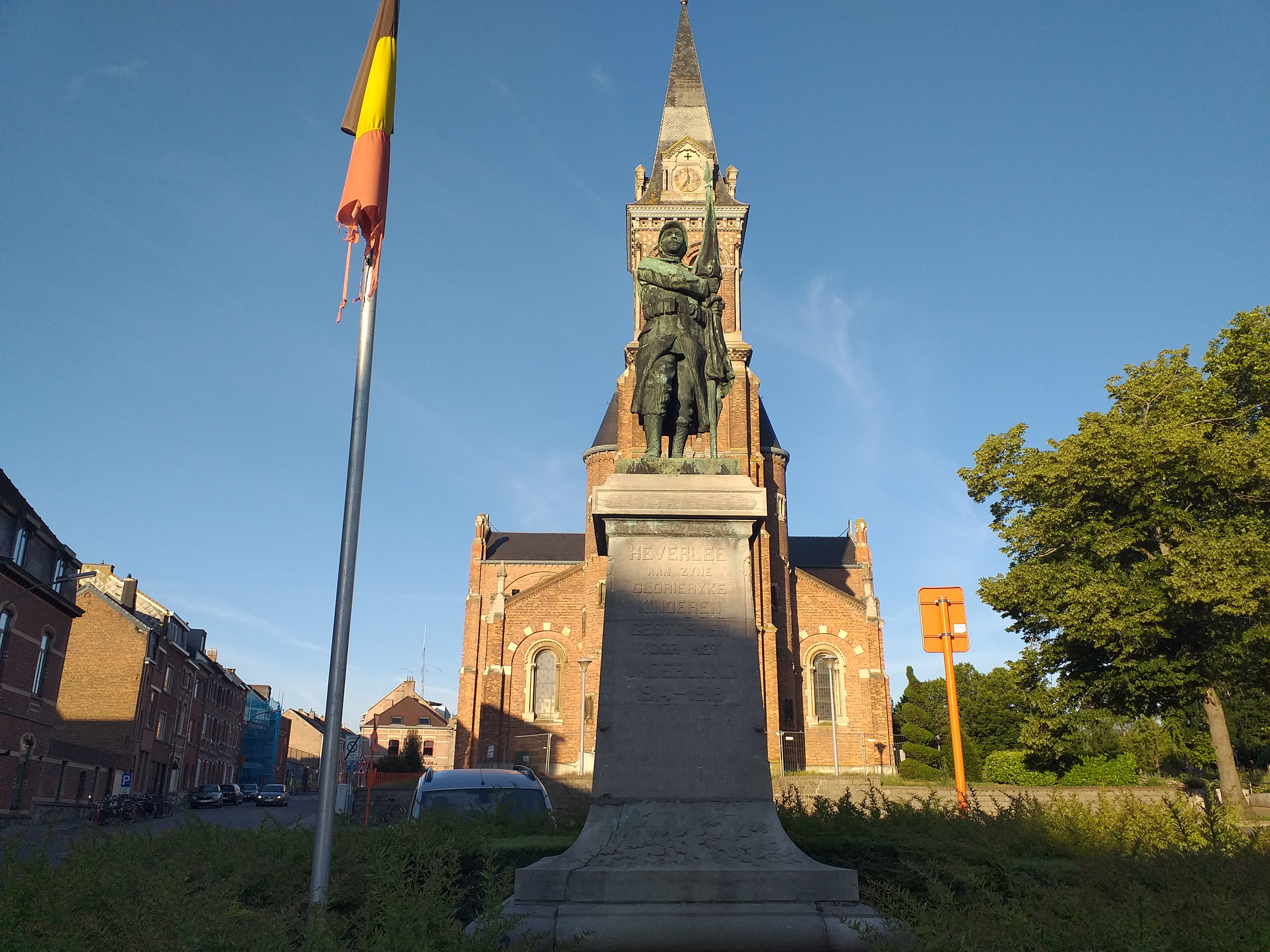
Monument to the fallen soldiers of World War I, Waversebaan Heverlee

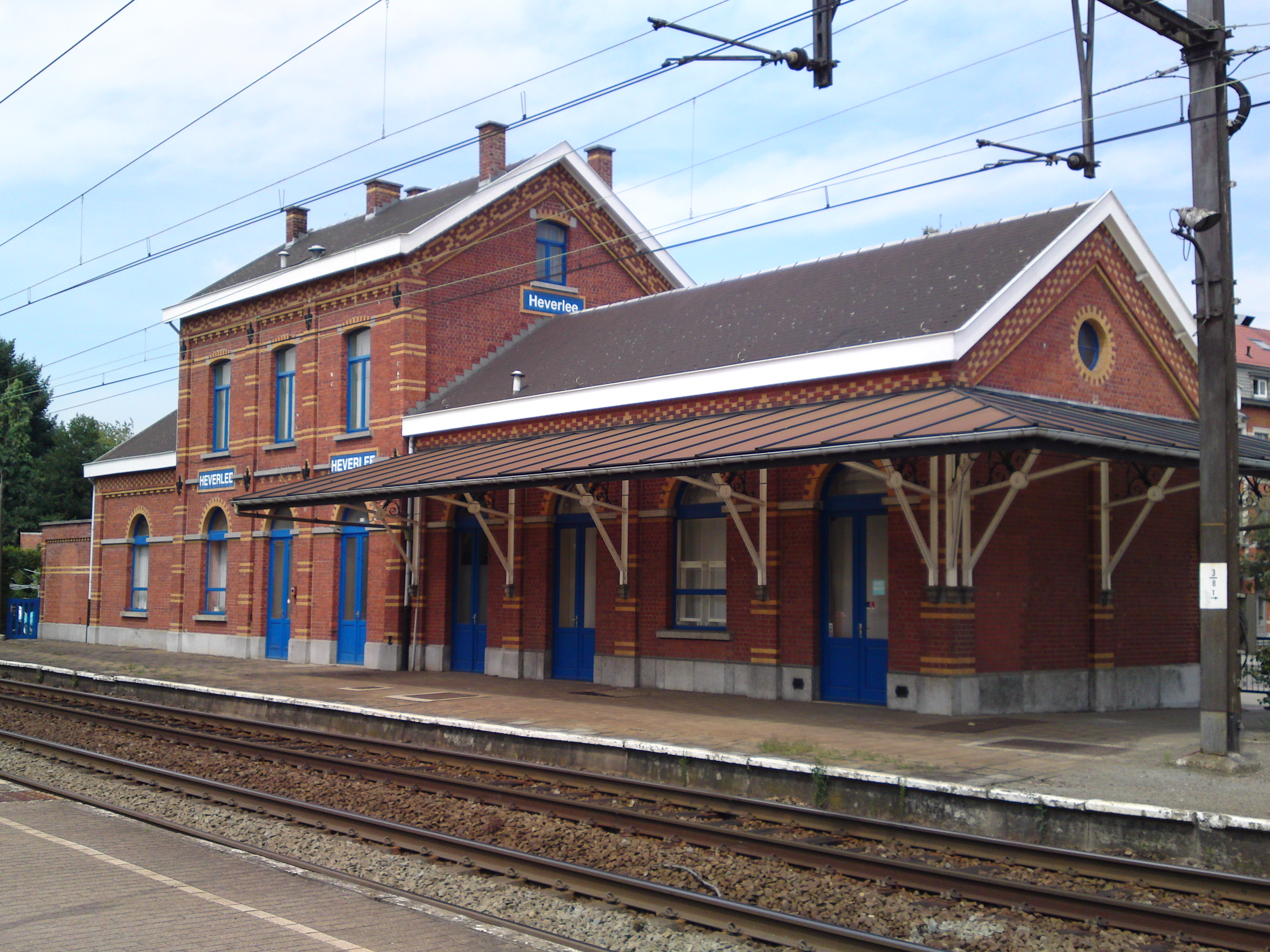
Heverlee Station

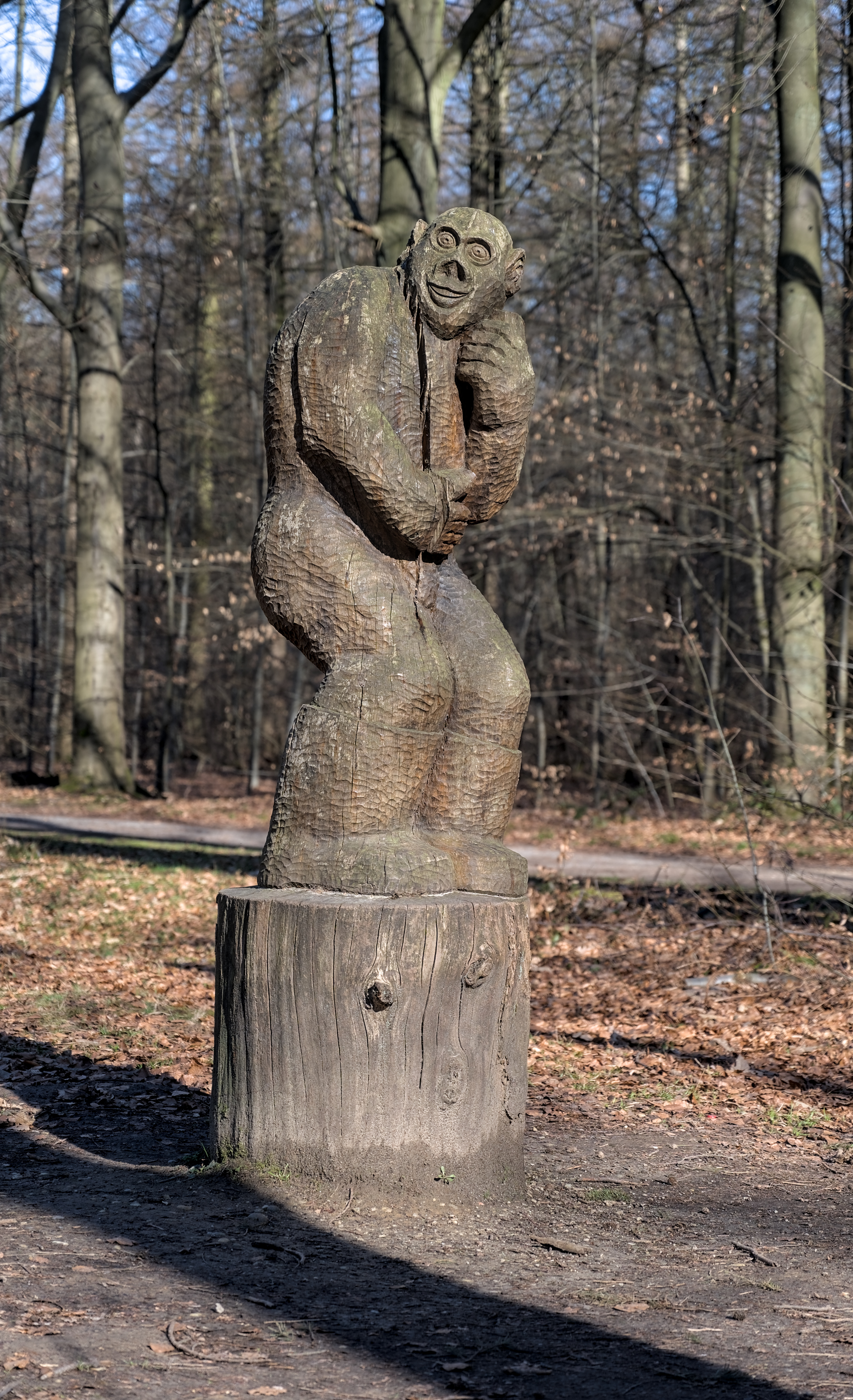
Wooden Neanderthaler sculpture by Ad Wouters in Heverleebos

== See also ==
- Arenberg Research-Park
