= Château of Arenberg =

Château in Heverlee, Belgium

- Kasteel van Arenberg (Dutch); Château d'Arenberg (French)
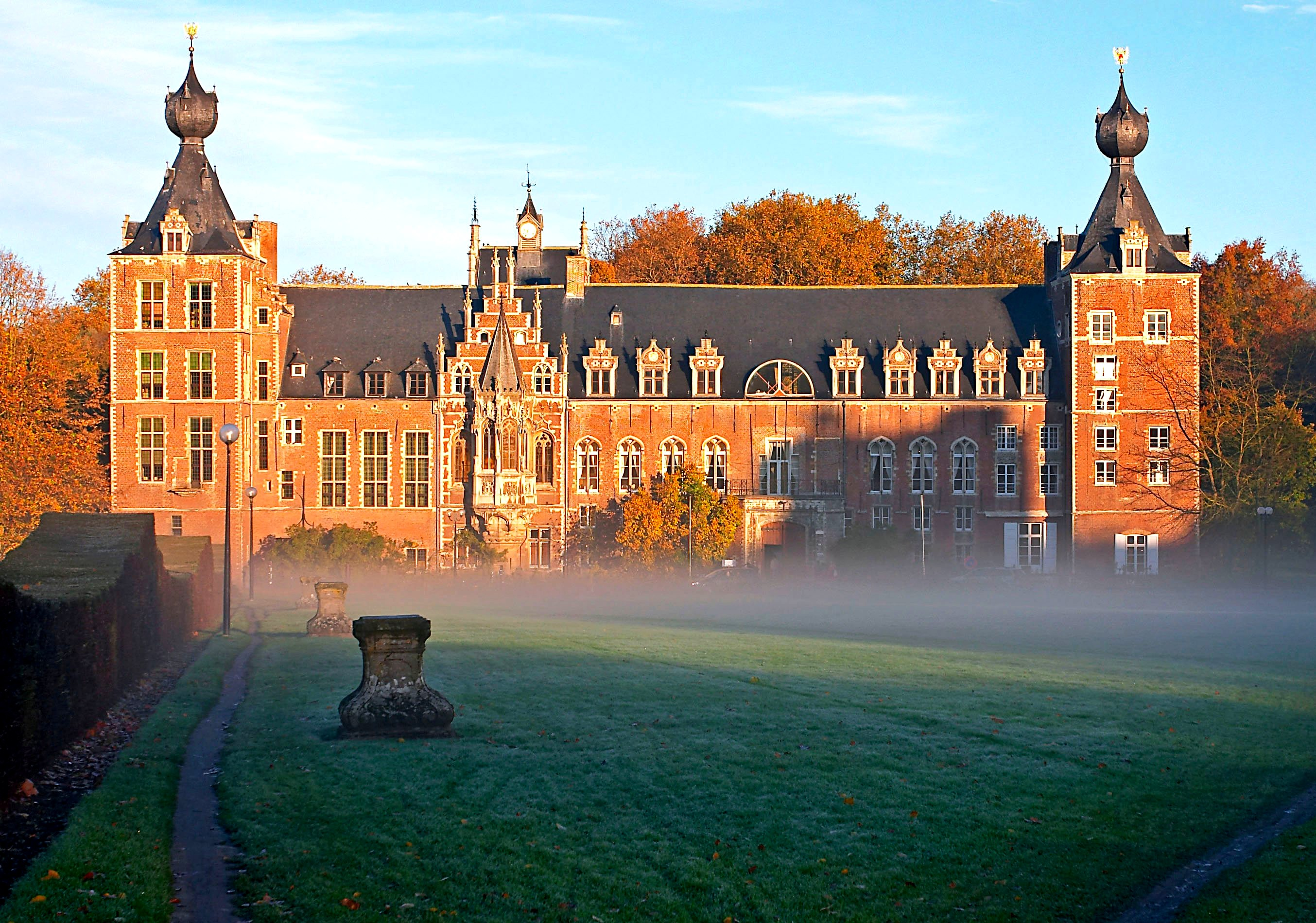
- Château of Arenberg
- Interactive map of the Château of Arenberg area

General information
- Type: Château
- Architectural style: Flemish Renaissance
- Location: Heverlee, Flemish Brabant, Belgium
- Coordinates: 50°51′48″N 4°40′59″E

The Château of Arenberg or Arenberg Castle (Dutch: Kasteel van Arenberg; French: Château d'Arenberg) is a Flemish Renaissance style château in Heverlee, close to Leuven, Belgium. It is surrounded by a park.

Built in place of a 12th-century medieval castle, the current château was started in the 16th century but still underwent many changes in the following centuries. In 1612, it passed into the hands of the Arenberg family, who occupied it until the First World War. The building is now owned by the Katholieke Universiteit Leuven (KU Leuven).

== History ==
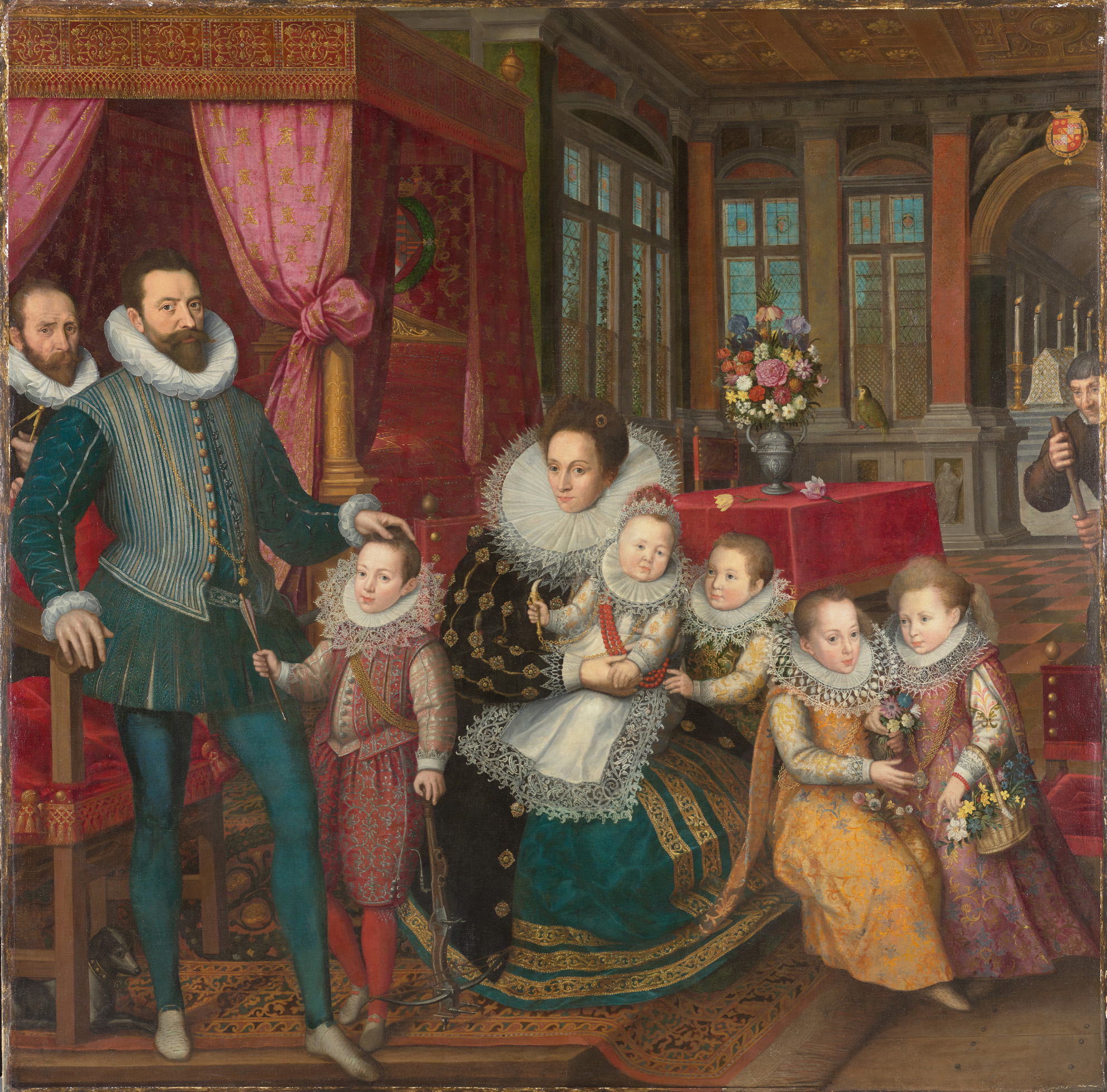
Charles d'Arenberg and Anne de Croÿ with family, c. 1593, by Frans Pourbus the Younger

The site had been the castle of the lords of Heverlee since the 12th century, but this family became impoverished and had to sell the site in 1445 to the Croÿ family from Picardy. In 1455, Antoine I de Croÿ demolished the medieval castle and started works to build the current château, destroying all but one of the original towers in the process. His grandson, William de Croÿ, completed the works on the château in 1515, and founded a monastery for Benedictine Celestines on its grounds. While the château's architectural style is largely traditionally Flemish, with sandstone window frames and brick walls, it has undergone structural alterations since 1515, incorporating elements of Gothic, Renaissance, and neo-Gothic architecture. Its large corner towers, once surmounted by a German eagle, are typical of the style. Charles III de Croÿ was the 4th and final duke, and following his death without issue in 1612, the château passed to the German House of Arenberg into which his sister had married, and remained in that family until the First World War.

Even before the First World War, the 8th duke of Arenberg wanted to sell the château and its grounds to the old Catholic University of Leuven at a reasonable price. During the war, the château and grounds were occupied by the Germans and Austrians. At the outbreak of the war, and then again after it, the château and park were seized by the Belgian government, since the Arenberg family was considered to be German or Austrian due to their close connection to the Habsburgs, the monarchs of Austria-Hungary. It took until 1921 for the university to acquire them, becoming an expanded natural sciences and engineering campus in the style of that of an American university. During the Second World War, the castle, whose main wing had been a protected monument since 1938, suffered considerable damage. In the 1960s, the university began restoration work, which also made it more suitable for teaching and research. On that occasion, several 19th-century interventions were reversed and some contemporary elements were added.

Following the university's partitioning along linguistic lines in 1968, the château and grounds remained with the Dutch-speaking half as one of the main campuses of the new, independent Katholieke Universiteit Leuven (KU Leuven). The château itself is the main building of the Faculty of Engineering and houses lecture rooms and studios for the Department of Architecture, Urbanism and Urban Planning, including the Post-Graduate Centre Human Settlements and the Raymond Lemaire International Centre for Conservation (named after Raymond M. Lemaire). The building is open to the public. The former Celestine monastery now houses the campus library, and the addresses of many of the science buildings are on the street named Celestijnenlaan (Dutch for "Celestine Street").

== See also ==
- List of castles and châteaux in Belgium
