= Marie Haps Faculty of Translation and Interpreting =

Educational institution in Brussels

- Faculté de traduction et interprétation Marie Haps
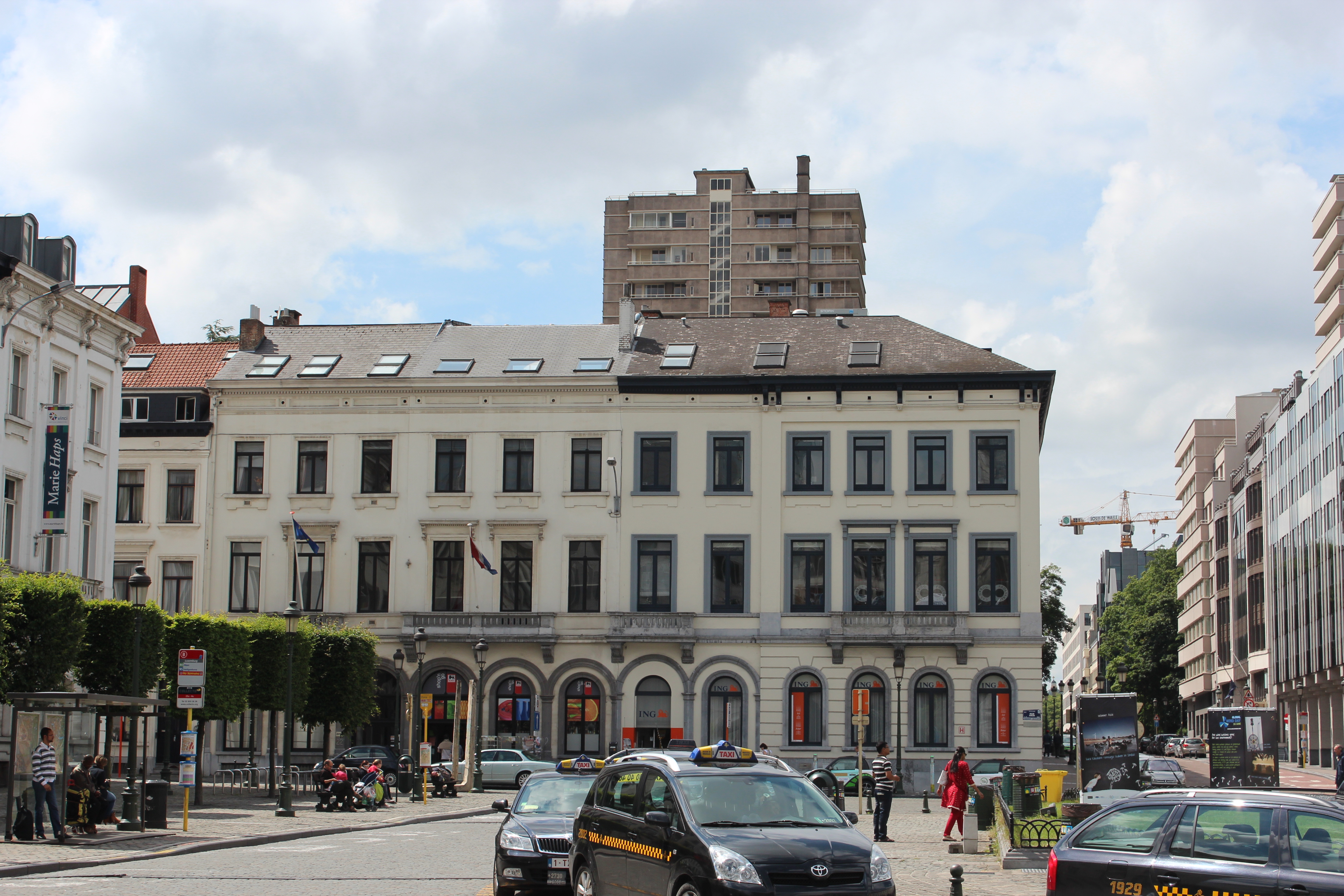
- The Place du Luxembourg/Luxemburgplein, Brussels, with the university buildings at far left.
- Other name: TIMH
- Former name: Institut libre Marie Haps
- Type: Free university (state funded)
- Established: 1955 (71 years ago)
- Parent institution: UCLouvain Saint-Louis - Bruxelles
- Academic affiliations: UCLouvain; IFCU; EUA; AUF
- Rector: Pierre Jadoul
- Location: Ixelles, 1050, Belgium; 50°50′19.04″N 4°22′19.06″E
- Campus: urban
- Colours: Saint-Louis red & Louvain blue
- Website: www.usaintlouis.be/sl/1838.html
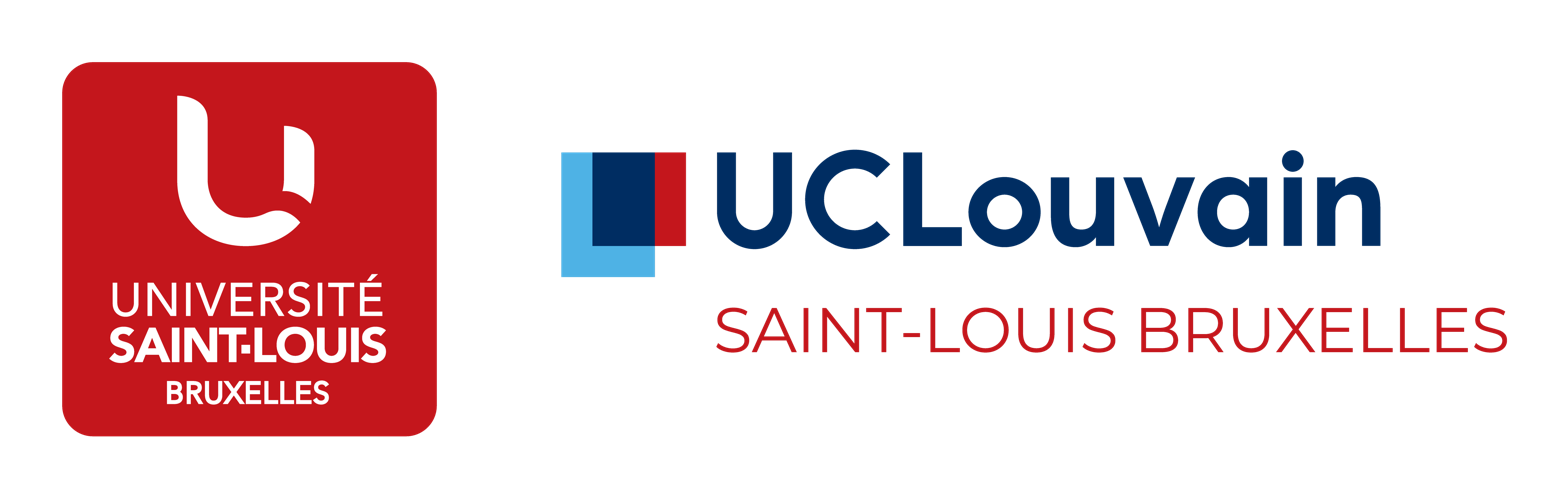

The Marie Haps Faculty of Translation and Interpreting (TIMH, in French: Faculté de traduction et interprétation Marie Haps) is a faculty of Saint-Louis University, Brussels (UCLouvain) located on its own campus in Brussels' European Quarter, in the municipalities of Ixelles and the City of Brussels. It is Belgium's oldest translation school, founded in 1955, and the fifth faculty of Saint-Louis University, Brussels, which it fully merged with in 2015.

== History ==
The École supérieure de jeunes filles (Higher School for Young Women) was founded by Marie Haps in 1919, with the help of Paulin Ladeuze, rector of the Catholic University of Louvain, and the support of Cardinal Mercier. The institution was established in the Hôtel Beernaert, at rue d'Arlon 11, on the border between Brussels and Ixelles.

In 1932, the Rector of the University of Louvain awarded the school the prestigious status of Fifth faculty of the Alma Mater.

When Marie Haps herself died in 1939, her daughter Simone Haps took over the management of the school, a position which she held until 1961. Simone pursued the development of the institution and with the establishment of the European institutions in the neighbourhood during the 1950s, and in expectation of the needs of Expo 58, she opened the country's first institute for translators and interpreters.

During the 1960s, the Marie Haps Language Centre was opened. It became a co-educational school in 1963. The school's official name was changed to Institut libre Marie Haps, sous le patronage de l'Université catholique de Louvain (Marie Haps Free Institute, under the patronage of the Université catholique de Louvain), to which partenaire de la Haute école Léonard de Vinci (partner of Léonard de Vinci College) was added in 1997; in short: Institut libre Marie Haps (ILMH). With the reorganization of higher education in the French Community of Belgium in 1995, Marie Haps was merged into Haute École Léonard de Vinci.

The Centre de terminologie de Bruxelles, which studies and advises on terminology, has been based in the institution since 1978.

In 2004, Belgium's French-speaking universities were grouped into three University Academies, with the long-term objective of merging into three large universities. The Catholic universities, including the University of Louvain and Saint-Louis University, Brussels, formed the Académie Louvain, with the aim of founding a single university, UCLouvain. In the short run, plans were made to merge a series of Brussels Catholic institutes of higher education, especially IHECS, ICHEC and the Marie Haps translation-interpreting department, first into Saint-Louis University, and later into UCLouvain.

From 2007 onwards, the Marie Haps Institute was able to award double bachelor and master degrees to its students together with Saint-Louis University, Brussels, allowing the department to award university degrees. Initial plans were to transfer the entire department of translation-interpreting to Saint-Louis University, then only the bachelor programmes, moving the masters in translation to Louvain-la-Neuve at the University of Louvain, and keeping the masters of interpreting in Brussels (double degrees with the Université libre de Bruxelles). In 2014, a decree finally established the integration of Belgium's translation and interpreting school to universities. The Marie Haps department was split in two, with only the bachelor programmes being kept in Brussels, within the new Marie Haps Faculty of Translation and Interpreting of Saint-Louis University. Classes are held at the Hôtel Beernaert and the Tilleul campus, both shared with the Institut libre Marie Haps which continues higher education in other fields. All masters programmes have been transferred to Louvain-la-Neuve, founding the Louvain School of Translation and Interpreting (LSTI) within UCLouvain's Faculty of Philosophy, Arts and Letters.

In 2014, the European Commission awarded its prestigious European Master's in Translation label to Marie Haps.

The same year, the Faculty launched a bachelor programme in translation and interpreting of sign language, the only one in Belgium, inaugurated by Minister Jean-Claude Marcourt.

== Description ==
=== Studies ===
The faculty organises 12 different bachelor programmes in translation and interpreting, all composed of three languages: French; English or German; and one other. A special programme is available for German-speaking students. The courses are harmonized with the programmes of the Louvain School of Translation and Interpreting of UCLouvain in Louvain-la-Neuve, where bachelors in translation are not offered.

The Marie Haps Faculty is the only one in Belgium offering an undergraduate programme in sign language. Therefore, by an agreement between Saint-Louis University, Brussels, UCLouvain and the University of Liège, students from Liège can take the sign language option at ULiège and follow the courses given in Brussels online, while having their other classes in Liège.

With its faculty of translation and interpreting, Saint-Louis University has been participating in the Erasmus programme since its creation in 1987, and before that already organized student exchanges with the University of Granada from the 1970s onwards. Semesters abroad are standard in the third year of the bachelor programme.

=== Research ===
A single research centre is affiliated to the Faculty of Translation and Interpreting: TranSphères. Faculty also participates in the Language Sciences Seminars (SeSLa) organized on the Saint-Louis campus.

The Centre de terminologie de Bruxelles is based at Marie Haps since its foundation in 1978.

=== Campus ===
The Faculty of Translation and Interpreting is based in the Hôtel Beernaert, former neoclassical residence of Auguste Beernaert, home of the Institut libre Marie Haps since its creation in 1919. The buildings are shared with the Haute école Léonard de Vinci and are now located on either side of the rue d'Arlon, near the European Parliament. The Marie-Haps Faculty is also located on the Tilleuls site (former Œuvre du Calvaire hospital) located on the Chaussée de Wavre, which includes a large country house, a caretaker's house, a chapel and the former hospital transformed into classrooms.

In addition, it has a faculty administration on the Saint-Louis campus (rue de l'Ommegang) as well as an assistant office for the Dean (Boulevard du Jardin botanique).

=== Student folklore ===
Unlike the other faculties of the Saint-Louis University - Brussels grouped in a single Cercle Saint-Louis, the folkloric student association of Marie Haps is the Cercle Marie Haps (CMH). Since its creation in the 1960s, it has only brought together students from the translation and interpretation department. Its members wear the calotte.
