= Marie Haps =

Belgian educationist (1879–1939)

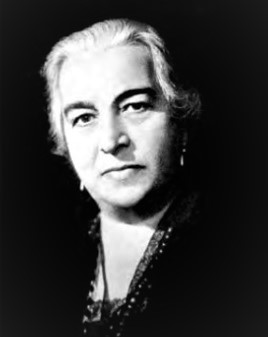
- Born: Marie Julie Frauenberg; April 29, 1879; Diekirch, Luxembourg
- Died: March 14, 1939 (aged 59)
- Occupation: Educationalist
- Known for: Founder of Institut Libre Marie Haps
- Spouse: Joseph Haps

Marie Haps (29 April 1879 – 14 March 1939) was a Luxembourg-born Belgian educationalist, the founder of what subsequently became the Institut Libre Marie Haps (now part of the Haute École Léonard de Vinci) and the Marie Haps Faculty of Translation and Interpreting (Saint-Louis University, Brussels).

== Life ==
Born at Diekirch, Luxembourg on 29 April 1879, Marie Julie Frauenberg married the Belgian financier Joseph Haps and moved to Brussels. In 1914, she set up a soup kitchen, and in 1920 was one of the founders of a seaside resort for working-class women in De Panne.

The achievement for which she is best remembered is the establishment in 1919 of a school of higher education for young women. In 1930 this school took her name as its own, and in 1932 it was accredited by the University of Louvain.

Marie Haps died 14 March 1939.

== Views ==
Rather than provide professional education for women, as was available in teacher training colleges and nursing colleges, Marie Haps wished to establish an institution that would provide general education to middle-class women whose futures would lie in their social roles as wife and mother. She regarded educated homemakers, the intellectual equals of their husbands, as having an important contribution to national reconstruction after the First World War. Her institute only began to provide professional education after the Second World War, first in training psychological assistants (from 1946) and then translators and interpreters (1955).

She gave an exposition of her views at the sixth Catholic Congress in Mechelen in September 1936, in a lecture that was subsequently published in the congress proceedings.
