= Fiscale Hogeschool =

University college in Brussels, Belgium

- Brussels Tax College
- Type: Private Catholic
- Established: 1969
- Director: Herman De Cnijf
- Location: Brussels, Belgium
- Campus: Brussels
- Affiliations: Catholic University of Leuven Association (as part of Hogeschool-Universiteit Brussel)
- Website: fhs.be

Fiscale Hogeschool, a.k.a. F.H.S. or Brussels Tax College, is a Belgian university college which especially offers degrees in tax law. The Brussels Tax College is located in Brussels.

== History ==
As a reaction on the lack of a completely tax oriented education in Flanders and the arrival of a new European sales tax in 1971, called Value Added Tax (VAT), the Brussels Tax College was constituted in 1969 by two major tax specialists, Albert Tiberghien and Willy Maeckelbergh. At that moment, the Brussels Tax College was a part of the St. Aloysius University College of Economics (EHSAL, °1925) in Brussels, which only had become independent from its original French-speaking counterpart Saint-Louis University, Brussels the same year and thus founded a series of parallel schools, including the F.H.S., to better establish its new presence in Brussels.

Its French-speaking counterpart, created at the same moment, is the École supérieure des sciences fiscales, currently held under the ICHEC Brussels Management School.

=== Founders ===
Since mid-thirties, the Ghent-based tax attorney Albert Tiberghien (1915-2001) was specialized in tax law. Tiberghien is considered as the first tax specialist in Belgium and as the founder of the tax sciences in Belgium. He was also the founder of the Belgian major law firm Tiberghien.

Willy Maeckelbergh has also become a renowned tax specialist. As co-founder of the F.H.S., he was responsible for the expansion of the university college. He also served as project manager for the expansion work on the buildings of the HUBrussel. Maeckelbergh is still the honorary chairman of the F.H.S. and the honorary president of the Professional Association of Tax Consultants, Accountants and Auditors, BAB-Brabant.

=== Merger ===
As a result of the mergers between EHSAL and the Catholic University of Brussels, the F.H.S. is since 2007 a part of the European University HUBrussel. HUBrussel split in 2013 : the university departments integrated the Katholieke Universiteit te Leuven while the non-academic departments contributed to the founding of Odisee college. The F.H.S. now works through a cooperation between Odisee and KU Leuven.

== Programs ==
Tax Law

Fiscal Sciences is a tax specialist course which is regarded in Belgium as the forerunner of the Master After Master Tax Law trainings. The two-year training includes 960 contact hours and provides access to the protected profession of Accountant-Tax advisor, as recognized by the Institute of Accountants and Tax Consultants (IAB) (Royal Decree of 4 May 1999, BS 29 June 1999 and last renewed by Decree of 14 May 2009, BS 2 June 2009).

On an annual basis, fifteen prizes are awarded to fifteen graduate students which achieved the highest score for a specific subject. These prices are awarded by accounting firms such as PriceWaterhouseCoopers, Deloitte, KPMG, Ernst & Young and BDO and by law firms like Tiberghien and Loyens & Loeff.

Tax Seminars

Seminars about specific tax topics.

Tax crash courses

- Corporate Law
- Corporate tax
- Personal income tax
- Value Added Tax

== Tax Compendium ==
Since 1979, the professors and lecturers of the F.H.S. are publishing (together with Wolters Kluwer) every year the so-called Tax Compendium ("Fiscaal Compendium"). It is an up-to-date reference work for the Belgian tax practice, consisting of twelve binders and over 8,000 pages.
