= Tchicaya U Tam'si =

Congolese author (1931–1988)

- Born: Gérald-Félix Tchicaya; 25 August 1931; Mpili, French Equatorial Africa (now Republic of the Congo)
- Died: 22 April 1988 (aged 56); Bazancourt, Oise, France
- Occupations: Poet, journalist
- Relatives: Aleth Félix-Tchicaya

Tchicaya U Tam'si (born Gérald-Félix Tchicaya, 25 August 1931 – 22 April 1988) was a Congolese author; his pen name means "small paper that speaks for its country" in Kikongo.

== Life ==
Born in Mpili, near Brazzaville, French Equatorial Africa (now Congo), in 1931, U Tam'si spent his childhood in France, where he worked as a journalist until he returned to his homeland in 1960. Back in Congo, he continued to work as a journalist; during this time he maintained contact to the politician Patrice Lumumba. In 1961, he started to work for UNESCO. He received Grand Prix at the 1966 first World Festival of Negro Arts in Dakar, Senegal.

== Death ==
U Tam'si died in 1988 in Bazancourt, Oise, near Paris.

Since 1989, the Tchicaya U Tam'si Prize for African Poetry is awarded every two years in the Moroccan city of Asilah.

== Style ==
U Tam'si's poetry incorporates elements of surrealism; it often has vivid historic images, and comments African life and society, as well as humanity in general.

== Tribute ==
Tchicaya U Tam'si was awarded the Grand Prix de la Mémoire of the GPLA 2014.

== Selected works ==
- Ces fruits si doux de l'arbre a pain, 1990
- Les Cancrelats, 1980
- La Veste d'intérieur suivi de Notes de veille, 1977
- L'Arc musical, Paris, 1970
- Le Ventre, Paris, 1964
- Épitomé, Tunis, 1962
- À triche-coeur, Paris, 1958
- Feu de brousse, Paris, 1957
- Le Mauvais Sang, Paris, 1955
