= Patricia De Martelaere =

Flemish philosopher, professor, author and essayist

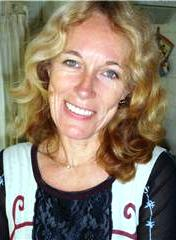
- Born: 16 April 1957; Zottegem, Belgium
- Died: 4 March 2009 (aged 51); Rotselaar, Belgium
- Occupations: philosopher, professor, author, essayist

Patricia De Martelaere (16 April 1957 – 4 March 2009) was a Flemish philosopher, professor, author and essayist. Born in Zottegem, Belgium, her full name was Patricia Marie Madeleine Godelieve. She graduated in philosophy from the Catholic University of Leuven and then taught and lectured there and at the Catholic University of Brussels.

She died in Wezemaal on 4 March 2009 at the age of 51 from complications of a brain tumor.

== Academic career ==
De Martelaere studied philosophy at the Catholic University of Leuven, where she received her PhD in 1984; the topic of her dissertation is the skepticism of David Hume. She became a professor in the philosophy department there, teaching Contemporary Philosophy, the Philosophy of Language, and Taoism, while publishing articles on Hume, Schopenhauer, Nietzsche, Freud, Wittgenstein, Derrida, Laozi (Lao-Tzu or Lao-tze), and Zhuangzi. She also served as a professor at the Catholic University in Brussels for the 2007–08 academic year. She was awarded an honorary doctorate for her lifetime achievements on 29 January 2009, during the 20th anniversary observance at the University for Humanistic Studies in Utrecht.

== Author ==
De Martelaere was known not only for her academic work, but also as an author of novels and essays. She made her literary debut at age fourteen with the youth novel King of the Jungle. Her first novel for adults was Nachtboek van een slapeloze (Night Book of an Insomniac) published in Belgium in 1988 and awarded the Prize for Best Debut. She then published De schilder en zijn model (The Painter and His Model, 1989), Littekens (Scars, 1990), and De staart (The Tail, 1992). In 1994 her collection of essays Een verlangen naar ontroostbaarheid (A Longing for Inconsolability) received the J. Greshoff Award. In 1997 she published another essay collection, Verrassingen (Surprises), which earned her the Belgian State Prize for Essay and Criticism. In 2004, more than a decade after her previous novel, she unexpectedly published Het onverwachte antwoord (The Unexpected Answer), which was nominated for both the AKO and Libris Literature Prizes and won the audience award at the Golden Owl.

Stefan Hertmans, De Morgen called her "a literary essayist--not only because of the attractive, almost Montaigne-like form she uses when writing her essays, but also because of the place she insists on reserving for art, dreams, and desire in her critical mental exercises. Time and again she provides a convenient gloss of a major theory which she then uses as a basis to logically justify her commentary or to subtly push the reasoning one step further."

== Literary Themes ==
De Martelaere was reluctant to seek publicity and preferred her work to speak for itself. She rarely gave interviews, instead writing essays and giving lectures about her field, ideas, work as an author. Her primary theme was to examine with great lucidity and philosophical insight the world of everyday life, death, and change, including both scientific and literary perspectives. Her literary works were realized by observing reality and processing her observations into ideas and metaphors. In one of her rare interviews she described her method as "plagiarizing reality."

She achieved considerable success in Flanders and the Netherlands with her first collection of essays, Een verlangen naar ontroostbaarheid (A Longing for Inconsolability: About Life, Art and Death), with sales over 15,000 copies. De Martelaere treats ostensibly difficult subjects such as Wittgenstein, Freud, art, religion, diaries, and love in ways that are philosophically serious without alienating the general reader. One review hails "her obstinacy, perverse and infectious sense of humour, courtly style, and deep erudition."

Verrassingen (Surprises) was her next collection of eleven essays, the first of which is "Home: A Place to Get Sick of". She alternates between literature and philosophy, referring to Freud, Jung, Stendhal, and Valéry, asserting that "home is where the boredom is: a kind of psychic relaxation that makes psychological space for the re-emergence of inspiration." In "The Exemplary Writer" she questions the position of Richard Rorty that literature is best used to promote feelings of solidarity and empathy between people. From both ethics and literature she considers the mystery by which artists may attempt to reveal in their art more than what can be seen or said. This ethical meaning of art should never be made subordinate to an interpretation or message. The essay "Prescribed Variations" on concepts such as "seeing", "longing", "body" and "moon" "have the density of aphorisms and reveal De Martelaere’s astounding capacity to express complex material clearly while immediately linking it to a challenging vision. An essay, as she states earlier in the book, is born of the paradoxical desire to explain and adorn reality, it longs to explore and to embellish. It is like a trial marriage between Einstein and Marilyn Monroe." In The Unexpected Answer she does not allow the writer, philosopher, husband, lover, and father Godfried H. to speak, but makes him instead the subject of six texts written from the points of view of the women who play a role in his life. The first draws his portrait. Initially she keeps her distance, later she embarks on an unexpected and brief relationship with him. Thus De Martelaere illustrates her claim that language is "not a tool" but "material" to an author.

== Philosophical works ==
- 1984 – Hume, science and ordinary thinking (PhD dissertation)
- 1987 – Hume's "moderate" Skepticism: futile or fatal? – Palace of the Academies, Brussels, 130 p.
- 1996 – The exemplary writer – Tilburg University Press, 28 p.
- 1996 – (ed.), Dubious thinking – History and forms of philosophical skepticism, Cook Agora / Pelckmans, Kampen / Chapels, 231 p.
- 1998 – A cold art – Studium Generale Maastricht.
- 1998 – Passions: Between ecstasy and discipline – (editorial + excess), Throw and Sticht Publishing, Baarn.
- 1998 – Belgian Endive (honoring Cornelis Verhoeven), Damon Publishing.
- 1999 – Something inside, Nijmegen University Press, Nijmegen, 1999. 16 p.
- 2000 – Weltfremdheit, Essays – Meulenhoff, Amsterdam, 159 p.
- 2001 – David Hume – with W. Lemmens, Pelckmans, Chapels, 192 p.
- 2001 – Who's afraid of death? – Valkhof Press / Titus Brandsma Institute, Nijmegen, 24 p.
- 2001 – Hume (Monographs), ed P. de Martelaere and W. Lemmens, Pelckmans / Agora, 192 p.
- 2002 – What remains – Foundation Month of Philosophy, 61 p.
- 2004 – The exquisite Hume: Hume Anthology of texts with introduction and commentary – (editorial, introduction and notes), Lannoo / Tielt and Boom / Amsterdam, 392 p.
- 2006 – Taoism – The road not to follow – Ambo, Amsterdam, 175 p.
- 2007 – What Remains – Essay, Em. Queridos publishing company, Amsterdam-Antwerp, 67 p.

== Literary works: fiction and essays ==
- 1971 – King of the Jungle – (children's book), Gakko, 117 p.
- 1988 – Night Book of an Insomniac – De Clauwaert / den Gulden Engel, 1988 1, 133p. (Prize for the best debut); Querido, 2006 2
- 1989 – The painter and his model – Meulenhoff, Amsterdam, 124 p.
- 1990 – Scars – Meulenhoff / Kritak, Amsterdam / Leuven, 163 p.
- 1992 – The tail – Meulenhoff, Amsterdam, 140 p.
- 1993 – A desire for inconsolability: about life, art and death – Essays – Meulenhoff, Amsterdam.
- 1997 – Surprises – Essays – Meulenhoff, Amsterdam, 189 p, State Prize for essays and criticism.
- 2002 – Nothing says – Poetry, Meulenhoff.
- 2004 – The unexpected answer – Meulenhoff, Amsterdam, 2004, p 256, 2007, 288 p, winner Golden Owl 2005 nomination for the Ako and Libris Literature Prize
- 2009 – Dear God – co-author Jan Lauwereyns, Introduction, Dietsche Warande & Belfort 1 February 2009 154th year, p. 11;
- 2009 – Is It You?, contribution under the title Dear God, Ibid., p. 12-17.

== Bibliography (in original Dutch) ==
- Hume, de wetenschap en het gewone denken (1984)
- Hume's gematigd scepticisme: futiel of fataal? (1987)
- Nachtboek van een slapeloze (1988)
- De schilder en zijn model (1989)
- Littekens (1990)
- De staart (1992)
- Een verlangen naar ontroostbaarheid (1993)
- De voorbeeldige schrijver (1996)
- Verrassingen (1997)
- Een koude kunst (1998)
- Passies (1998)
- Iets binnenin (1999)
- Wereldvreemdheid (2000)
- Wie is er bang voor de dood? (2001)

== Awards ==
- Prize for the best debut – Night Book of an Insomniac, 1988
- 1994 – Jan Greshoff Prize for A desire for inconsolability, 1993
- 1997 – Staatsprijs voor essay en kritiek
- 2000 – Flemish Culture Prize for essay and criticism (1997-1999) for – Surprises, 1997
- 2005 – Golden Owl Literature Reader's Prize for The unexpected answer, 2004
- 2009 – Honorary Doctorate from University for Humanist Studies in Utrecht
- 2009 – Best magazine article in 2009 for "You Exist?", Celt prize organized by nonprofit umbrella organization of the Flemish Cultural and literary magazines, in collaboration with Knack.

== See also ==
- Flemish literature

== Sources ==
- Works by Patricia De Martelaere at Open Library
- Patricia De Martelaere (K.U. Brussel)
- Patricia De Martelaere (in Dutch)
- Patricia De Martelaere (in Dutch)

=== Obituaries ===
- Michiel van Kempen op De Amsterdamse Lezing (The Amsterdam Lecture)
- Marja Pruis in De Groene Amsterdammer (Green Amsterdam)
- John Thackara op "Doors of Perception"
- Toon Vandevelde op filosofie.be
