= Bazancourt =

Bazancourt is the name of several communes in France:

- Bazancourt, Marne, in the Marne department
- Bazancourt, Oise, in the Oise department
