= Saint Louis University (disambiguation) =

Saint Louis University (SLU) is a research university in St. Louis, Missouri.

Saint Louis University may also refer to:

- Saint-Louis University, Brussels (UCLouvain), a research university in Brussels, Belgium
- Saint Louis University (SLU), a university in Baguio City, Philippines
