= Institute of Astronomy =

Institute of Astronomy or Institute for Astronomy may refer to:

- Institute of Astronomy, Cambridge, England
- Institute of Astronomy of the Bulgarian Academy of Sciences, Sofia, Bulgaria
- Institute of Astronomy, National Central University, Jhongli, Taiwan
- Institute of Astronomy, NCU, Toruń, Poland
- Institute of Astronomy of the Russian Academy of Sciences, Moscow, Russia
- Institute for Astronomy (Hawaii), Honolulu, Hawaii, United States
- Institute for Astronomy, School of Physics and Astronomy, University of Edinburgh, Scotland
- Institute for Astronomy, Astrophysics, Space Applications and Remote Sensing, Mount Penteli, Greece
- Institute for Astronomy and Astrophysics, Brussels, Belgium
- Academia Sinica Institute of Astronomy and Astrophysics, Taipei, Taiwan
- Dunlap Institute for Astronomy & Astrophysics, Toronto, Canada
- Max Planck Institute for Astronomy, Heidelberg, Baden-Württemberg, Germany

== See also ==
- Argentine Institute of Radio Astronomy, Buenos Aires, Argentina
- ASTRON, the Netherlands Institute for Radio Astronomy
- Indian Institute of Astrophysics, Bengaluru, Karnataka, India
- Korea Astronomy and Space Science Institute, Daejeon, South Korea
- Max Planck Institute for Radio Astronomy (Max-Planck-Institut für Radioastronomie), in Bonn, Germany.
