= Institut libre Marie Haps =

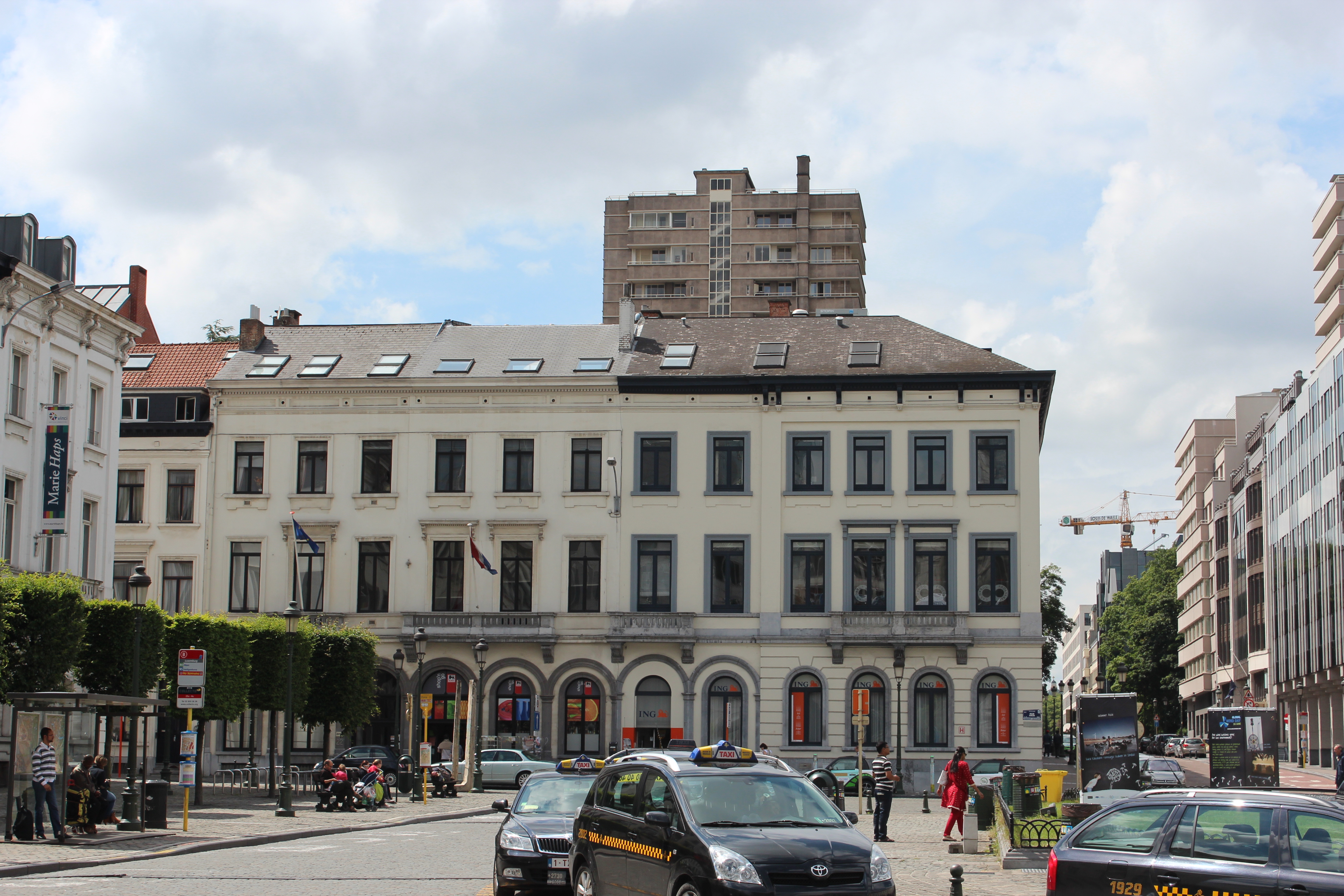
- Place Luxembourg, Brussels: Institut libre Marie Haps at far left.
- Other names: ILMH
- Former names: École supérieure de jeunes filles
- Type: Autonomous college (state funded)
- Active: 1919–2019
- Parent institution: Haute Ecole Léonard de Vinci (1995 onwards)
- Location: Rue d'Arlon 11, 1050 Ixelles, Brussels, Belgium; 50.838716°N 4.371843°E
- Campus: Urban
- Language: French
- Website: www.vinci.be

The Institut libre Marie Haps (ILMH) was a former French-speaking institution of higher education in Brussels, Belgium, founded by Marie Haps in 1919. Since 1995 it has become a constituent part of Haute École Léonard de Vinci except for its translation and interpreting department which, still on campus, is a faculty of Saint-Louis University, Brussels (UCLouvain) since 2015. Since 2019, the Haute École Léonard de Vinci is no longer divided in institutions but in sectors. The name Institut libre Marie Haps still remains as a quality label for some of the trainings given in the Haute École Léonard de Vinci.

Courses were provided in psychology, audiology and speech therapy. A department for translation and interpreting was established in 1955, but in 2015 the Bachelor programme was transferred to the newly established Marie Haps Faculty of Translation and Interpreting at Saint-Louis University, Brussels, while staying on the same campus in the Rue d'Arlon. The Master's degrees of translation and of interpreting were moved to Louvain-la-Neuve, in the newly founded Louvain School of Translation and Interpreting at the University of Louvain (UCLouvain).

The college's buildings were shared with Saint-Louis University and are located on both sides of the Rue d'Arlon, in front of the European Parliament, in the municipality of Ixelles and the City of Brussels.

== Notable alumni ==
- Queen Mathilde of Belgium (1994)
- Tom Vandenkendelaere, MEP
