= Aleth Félix-Tchicaya =

Congolese writer

- Born: 1955 (age 70–71); Brazzaville
- Citizenship: Belgium
- Education: Universite libre de Bruxelles
- Occupations: Charity worker; writer
- Relatives: Jean Félix-Tchicaya Yvonne Félix-Tchicaya Tchicaya U Tam'si
- Writing career
- Language: French
- Genres: Autobiography; fiction

Aleth Félix-Tchicaya (born 1955) is a writer and development worker from the Republic of the Congo, who founded the charity 'Les enfants d'Aleth' which addresses child homelessness.

== Biography ==
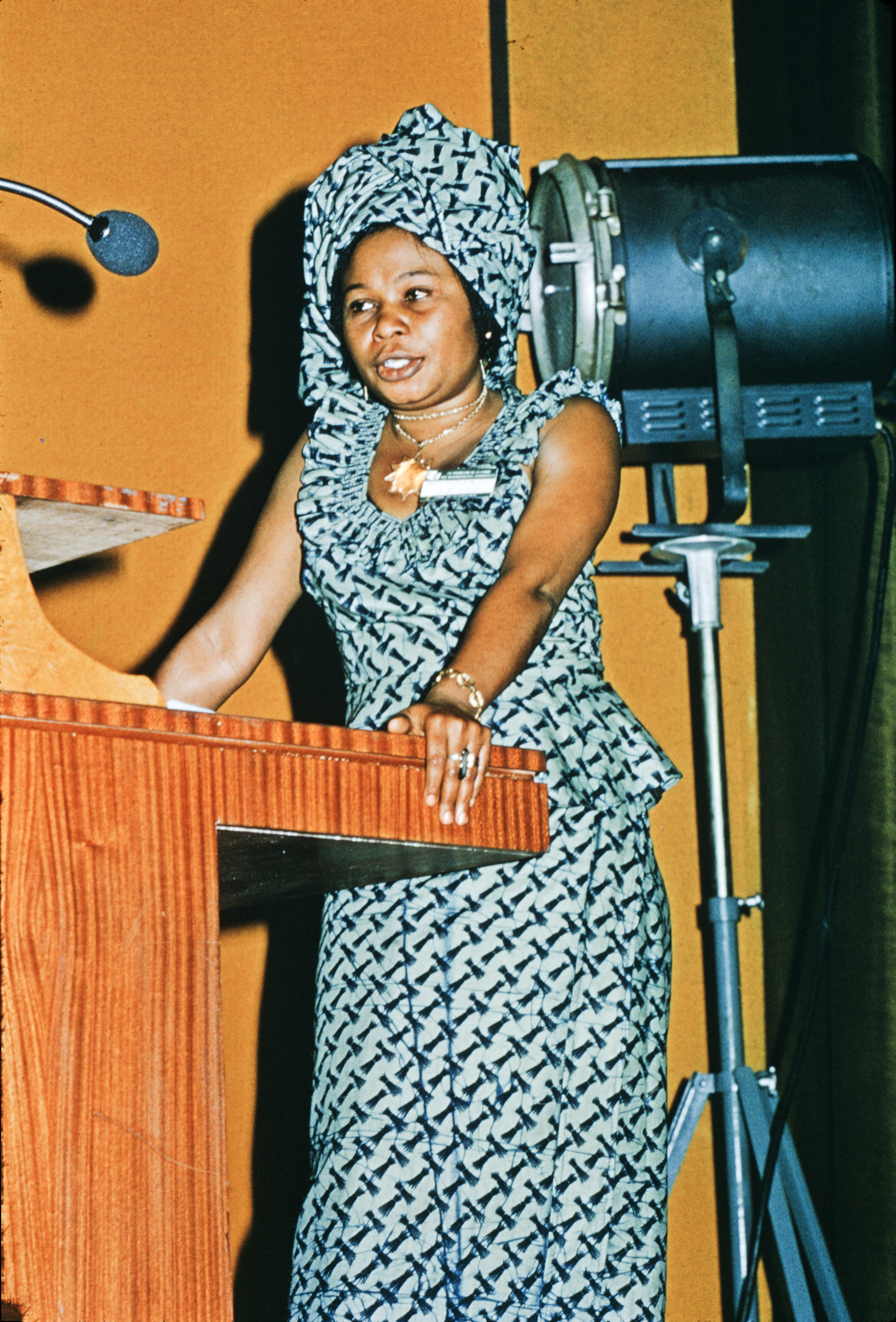
Yvonne Félix-Tchicaya (her mother) in 1975)

Félix-Tchicaya was born in 1955 in Brazzaville, Republic of Congo. Her mother, Yvonne Félix-Tchicaya, was a government advisor and was the daughter of Jean Félix-Tchicaya, who was in 1955 the first Congolese parliamentarian to be elected to the French Constituent Assembly. Her uncle is the poet Tchicaya U Tam'si. She emigrated to France aged 10, in order to continue her secondary school education. She studied Political Science and International Relations at the Université libre de Bruxelles. She went on to specialize in international development and is a Belgian citizen.

In 1982, after graduation, until 1987, Félix-Tchicaya worked at the Congolese Ministry of Cooperation and Development. During the 1990s, she lived in Dakar, Senegal, and worked as a trade consultant to the government of the Republic of the Congo. In 2007 she established the charity 'Les enfants d'Aleth'. At the time she was being treated for breast cancer.

Félix-Tchicaya has written two books: Lumière de femme is a novel about a young woman finding her place in Congolese society and draws on the authors life; Les mamelons de Jaman is the first volume of her autobiography.

== Literary reception ==
Félix-Tchicaya's literary work is seen as part of a canon of post-colonial Congolese novels, which address politics and corruption. Another important theme in her books is the role of women in the Congolese diaspora.

== Awards ==
- Woman of the Year - National Association of Professional Women (NAPW), 2016.
- Chevalier dans l’Ordre du Merite Congolais (Congolese Order of Merit), 1987.

== Publications ==
- Lumière de femme Paris: Hatier, col. Monde Noir, 2003.
- Les mamelons de Jaman Nantes: Editions Amalthée, 2010.
