= Hogeschool-Universiteit Brussel =

Dutch language university

Coordinates: 50°50′56″N 4°21′25″E

University College Brussels
- Hogeschool-Universiteit Brussel
- Type: Public Catholic
- Active: 1925 (HUBrussel since 2007)–2014 (Odisee from 2014 on)
- Director: Dirk De Ceulaer
- Administrative staff: 1,100
- Students: 9,000 (degree programmes); 9,500 (postgraduate programmes)
- Location: Brussels, Belgium
- Campus: Brussels and Dilbeek
- Affiliations: KU Leuven Association

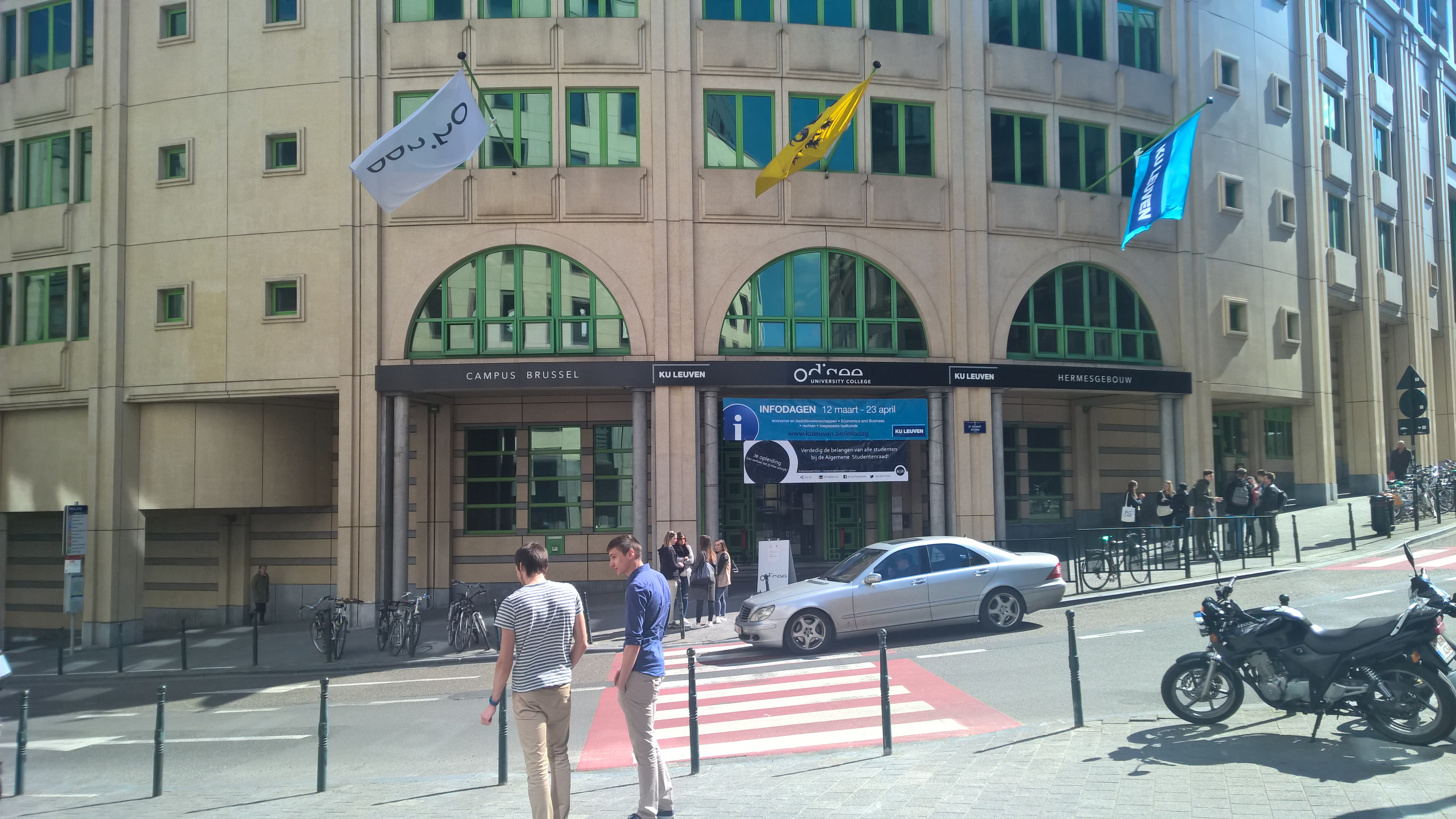
Hermes building, now jointly used by KU Leuven campus Brussels and Odisee

Hogeschool-Universiteit Brussel (HUBrussel or HUB) was a Dutch-language university founded in 2007. HUBrussel was the result of a merger between Brussels-based colleges European University College Brussels, Vlekho, HONIM and Catholic University of Brussels (KUBrussel).

HUBrussel offered degrees both at university and college level for the Flemish Community of Belgium. Degrees were offered both in Dutch and in English.

From 2013 on, university level degrees were organised by KU Leuven. Professional bachelor's degrees remained at HUB till HUB itself merged with the Katholieke Hogeschool Sint-Lieven in 2014 and became Odisee.

== History ==
European University College Brussels was founded in 1925 as St. Aloysius University College of Economics (EHSAL), as a Dutch-speaking department of the Faculté universitaire Saint-Louis, nowadays Saint-Louis University, Brussels.

At the merger with VLEKHO, HONIM and KUBrussel in 2008, more than 9,000 students were attending classes in undergraduate, graduate and academic advanced programmes at seven faculties. HUBrussel had five faculties in the Brussels-Capital Region and one in the nearby Flemish municipality of Dilbeek. There used to be one in Dubai, called European University College Brussels Dubai, but this has been closed.

HUBrussel is associated with the Katholieke Universiteit Leuven.

== Programs ==
HUBrussel programmes are organised by two educational divisions

=== Academic bachelors and masters ===
The academic bachelors and masters were taken over by the Catholic University of Leuven and are based around three faculties that together offer 13 undergraduate and graduate programmes:

- Economics and management:

Commercial sciences
Business engineering
Environment, health and safety management

- Linguistics and literature:

Literature
Applied linguistics
Interpretation, translation
Multilingual communication
Journalism

- Law

=== Professional bachelors ===
The professional bachelors include four fields of study that offer 13 undergraduate programmes:

- Education:

Nursery teaching
Primary education
Secondary education

- Health care:

Occupational therapy
Medical imaging
Nursing
Optics and optometry

- Social and community work:

Social work
Socio-educational care work
Family sciences

- Commercial sciences and management

Operations management
Office management
Applied informatics

== Figures ==
- The number of participants in postgraduate programmes and seminars amounts to 9500
- Over 500 regular non-EU students in degree programmes in Brussels
- Over 100 regular (non-Belgian) EU students in degree programmes in Brussels
- Appr. 170 inbound exchange students and 110 outbound exchange students
- Number of staff: 1100

== See also ==
- Fiscale Hogeschool
