= Philippe Autier =

Belgian scientist (born 1956)

- Born: 29 December 1956 (age 69); Turin, Italy
- Education: Université libre de Bruxelles
- Known for: work on UV exposure as a carcinogen
- Scientific career
- Fields: Epidemiology
- Workplaces: International Prevention Research Institute

Philippe Autier (born 29 December 1956) is a Belgian epidemiologist. He is doing research on cancer, where he contributed to the understanding of the role of UV exposure in cancer development.

== Biography ==
Autier was born in Brussels, Belgium, and studied medicine at the Université libre de Bruxelles and received a Doctor of Medicine degree in 1982, and a diploma in tropical medicine from the Prince Leopold Institute of Tropical Medicine, Antwerp in 1983.

He started his professional life by joining the humanitarian non-governmental organization Médecins Sans Frontières, where he helped in Honduras (1985 and 1986), and later in Chad (1987–88) as the medical coordinator of projects conducted by a team of about 50 expatriates and 200 Chadian health workers. During that time Philippe Autier launched and coordinated the first Early Warning Systems for famine prevention in Mali and Chad, projects funded by the European Commission. He also conducted various expert missions as an epidemiologist in Angola, Mozambique, Hong Kong, Zaïre, and the Sudan. Additionally he was a founding member and epidemiologist at the European Agency for Health and Development (AEDES, Brussels-Paris-Barcelona), specialized in the management of pharmaceuticals and health services at country level and in the handling of epidemics or large scale nutritional problems.

In 1988 he received a Fulbright fellowship with a grant from the Frank Boas Foundation to study at Harvard School of Public Health, Cambridge, Massachusetts, where he was awarded a M.P.H. Going back to Europe in 1989, Autier joined Institut Jules Bordet, an oncology centre in Brussels, as head of the Epidemiology and Prevention Unit, and the Oeuvre Belge du Cancer, an agency active in cancer prevention. Eventually he became coordinator of the Brussels Breast Cancer Screening Programme implemented by the three universities operating in the Brussels area.

From 1994 to 1996 he was working for Merck Sharp and Dohme, (MSD), as a health outcome manager for studies on health economics and evidence-based medicine. He moved to Milan and worked as the deputy director of the Epidemiology Department of the European Institute of Oncology, where his work on UV and sunbeds started. At this time he also joined the working group which developed and updated the European Code against Cancer.

In 2000 Autier was invited to work for the European Commission, DG Sanco, and at the Luxembourg Institute for Health, located at the Centre de Recherche Publique Santé (CRP-Santé), where he was head of the centre for epidemiology and statistics until 2003. He returned to the Institut Jules Bordet for two more years and finally moved to Lyon, France, to join the International Agency for Research on Cancer, IARC, as Head of the Unit of Prevention Evaluation(former Epidemiology Methods and Support Group) and Cluster Coordinator of the Biostatistics and Epidemiology Cluster until 2009.

During 2009 Autier moved to the International Prevention Research Institute, to take over the post of a research director.

== Scientific work ==
Autier's main field of research is the study of environmental factors for cancer and the evaluation of cancer prevention technologies. For the first field he is known for his work on causes and prevention of skin cancers, mainly the cutaneous melanoma, where he has the goal to evaluate exposure to solar and artificial ultraviolet radiation (see also his work on cancer risks with sunbeds). Within the second field he was involved in the development and coordination of clinical studies aiming at testing the medical value of a new ultrasound-based technique for the early detection of ovarian, prostate and breast cancers (HistoScanning).

Currently he is a member of the editorial board of Melanoma Research, and the European Journal of Cancer. He is a member and co-chairman of EPIMEL, the Epidemiology and Prevention section of the EORTC Melanoma Co-operative Group. Autier is past president and member of the board of EPISEARCH, a non-profit organization under Belgian law dedicated to the promotion of emerging innovative methods (in economics, biostatistics and data handling) for clinical and population studies, and president of the board of AEDES Foundation.

Autier has published about 200 scientific articles.
