= Saint-Louis University, Brussels =

Autonomous university in Brussels, Belgium

- UCLouvain Saint-Louis Bruxelles
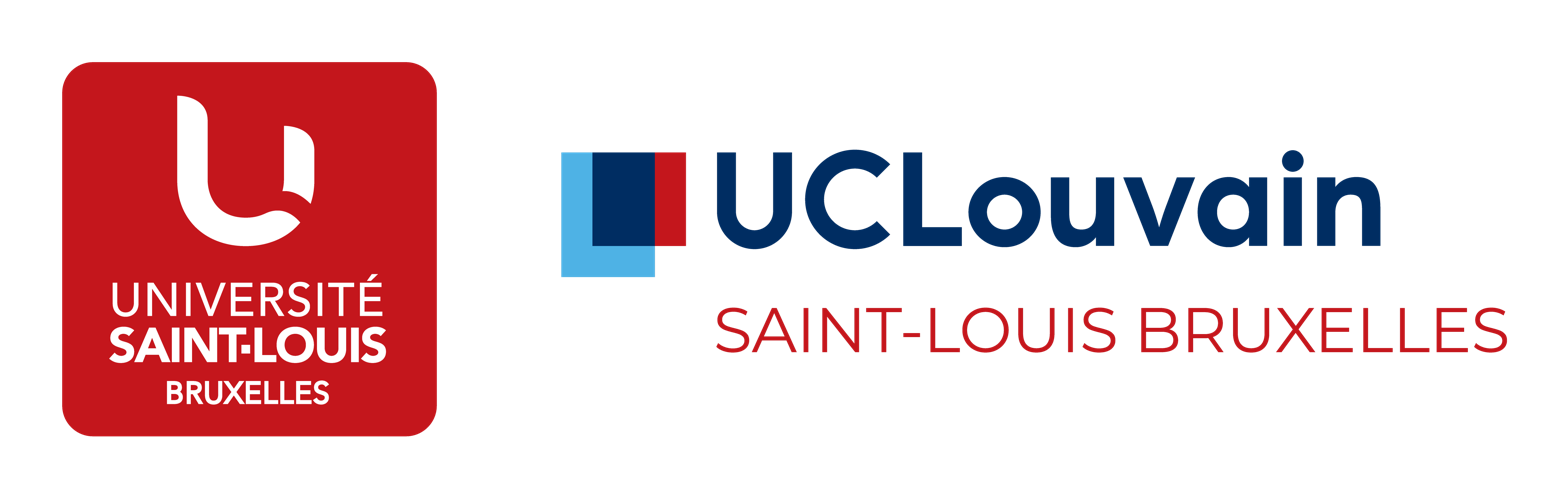
- Other names: UCLouvain Saint-Louis Brussels
- Former names: Université Saint-Louis - Bruxelles (2013-2018); Facultés universitaires Saint-Louis (1929–2012); Faculté universitaire Saint-Louis
- Motto: Sedes Sapientiae (Latin)
- Motto in English: Seat of Wisdom, Seat of Knowledge
- Type: Free university (state funded)
- Established: 1857 (169 years ago)
- Parent institution: UCLouvain
- Religious affiliation: Roman Catholicism
- Academic affiliations: Académie Louvain; IFCU; EUA; AUF
- Budget: €39,785,004 (2018)
- Rector: Pierre Jadoul
- Academic staff: 403
- Administrative staff: 104
- Students: 4,482 (2021)
- Doctoral students: 64
- Location: Brussels, 1000, Belgium; 50°51′11.21″N 4°21′40.59″E
- Campus: Saint-Louis (urban); Marie Haps (urban)
- Colours: Saint-Louis Red & Louvain Blue
- Website: www.usaintlouis.be

Saint-Louis University, Brussels, also known as UCLouvain Saint-Louis Brussels, is an autonomous university campus specialized in social and human sciences part of UCLouvain and based in Brussels, Belgium.

Established in 1857, Saint-Louis University, Brussels (officially, in French Université Saint-Louis – Bruxelles) used to be a public university belonging to the French Community of Belgium before a merger with the University of Louvain decided in 2017. Both universities have been using the new designation 'UCLouvain' since 2018 and legally merged in 2023.

== History ==
When the Catholic University of Belgium moved from Mechelen to Leuven in 1835, the unused buildings were used to host the newly founded École de Commerce et d'Industrie (School of Trade and Industry), which was inaugurated in 1838.

The school moved to Brussels in 1858 and became the Institut Saint-Louis (a diocesan secondary school), where the Philosophy Department was founded, which eventually grew to become a university. This was the result of the Catholic clergy's and Pope Pius IX's wish to have a Catholic institution in Brussels teaching philosophy. The department prepared candidates for the higher liberal arts certification that would qualify them to enroll for a university law degree.

In 1891, with the recognition of non-state universities, the institution became recognized as an autonomous ('free') university, a status which was confirmed in 1929.

Over time, Faculties developed and expanded, and a Faculty of Law was added to the Faculty of Philosophy and Letters.

In 1925, the university founded HEC Saint-Louis (Hautes études commerciales), Belgium's first independent business school, together with its Dutch-speaking counterpart, EHSAL (St. Aloysius College of Economics). Also, the university established the world-renowned School of Philosophical and Religious Sciences, founded by Cardinal Mercier.

In 1948, the Philosophy and Arts section separated from the Institut Saint-Louis, and continued independently as a non-profit university under the name "Faculté universitaire Saint-Louis". It was not until 1960 that the administrative split was fully effective and the buildings separated.

In 1965, the Faculty of Economic, Social and Political Sciences (ESPO) was established and the university's name was later changed to the plural Facultés universitaires Saint-Louis.

In 1969, Saint-Louis starts giving lectures to Dutch-speaking students, in addition to lessons at EHSAL/HEC, but the Dutch-speaking department would leave the Facultés universitaires Saint-Louis in 1973, to create the independent Universitaire Faculteiten Sint-Aloysius (UFSAL). This later became the Catholic University of Brussels (K.U.Brussel). Both UFSAL and EHSAL merged to create the Hogeschool-Universiteit Brussel (HUB), together with other Flemish institutions like Vlekho, which originated from the Saint-Louis-linked Institut libre Marie Haps. In 2013, HUB was reorganized and today comprises the KU Leuven campus Brussel, and the vocational college Odisee. Both are still located in the same street as Saint-Louis University, the rue du Marais or Broekstraat.

French-speaking HEC Saint-Louis, which was renamed to ISC Saint-Louis (Institut supérieur de Commerce), co-founded the "ICHEC - ISC Saint-Louis - ISFSC" Consortium of Schools in 1995, and de facto integrated the Institut catholique des Hautes Études commerciales (ICHEC) in 2004. Saint-Louis University, Brussels still organises degrees in economics, management and business engineering, on the same site as the ISC Saint-Louis, within its Faculty of Economics, Politics, Social and Communication Sciences (ESPO).

Between 2004 and 2013, Saint-Louis University and the three other Belgian French-speaking Catholic universities; namely the University of Namur, the Université catholique de Louvain and the Facultés universitaires catholiques de Mons (now a part of UCLouvain) made up the Académie universitaire Louvain network. This notably meant the integration of Saint-Louis' economics and management programmes into the Louvain School of Management. After the reform of Belgian French-speaking universities in 2013, Saint-Louis became a founding member of the Pôle académique de Bruxelles, along with the Université libre de Bruxelles and, by decree, was renamed from Facultés universitaires Saint-Louis to Université Saint-Louis - Bruxelles.

In May 2017, Saint-Louis University, Brussels and the University of Louvain (primarily based in Louvain-la-Neuve and which has 2 campuses in Brussels: Woluwe and Saint-Gilles) officially announced that the two universities were merging in a single institution named UCLouvain, with Saint-Louis becoming 'UCLouvain Saint-Louis - Bruxelles'. Both institutions have started using the name UCLouvain in September 2018.

Saint-Louis' main campus is located on the northern edge of the historic inner city, opposite the Botanical Garden of Brussels across the small ring road. In 2015, the department and programmes of translation and interpreting of the Institut libre Marie Haps were transferred to the newly established Marie Haps Faculty of Translation and Interpreting at Saint-Louis University, Brussels. This fifth Faculty is located in buildings along the rue d'Arlon, near the European Parliament.

=== Chronology ===
- 1835: the Catholic University of Belgium, installed in Mechelen, moves to Leuven (Louvain) to form the Catholic University of Louvain. The École de Commerce et d'Industrie in the premises left by the university (the official opening took place in 1838).
- 1858: transfer of the École de Commerce et d'Industrie to Brussels, becoming the Institut Saint-Louis, and foundation of the Section for Philosophy teaching Philosophy & Arts, and Law.
- 1891: the private institution is considered an autonomous ('free') university with recognized university degrees.
- 1925: founding of the School of Philosophical and Religious Sciences and of HEC Saint-Louis, Belgium's first business school, as well as EHSAL (Economische Hogeschool Sint-Aloysius), the Dutch-speaking equivalent.
- 1929: a new law declares the institution to be an independent university.
- 1948: creation of the ASBL (non-profit organization) Faculté universitaire Saint-Louis.
- 1949: an order of the Regent confirms the autonomy of Saint-Louis' university education.
- 1960: complete autonomy between the university faculty and the Saint-Louis Institute (primary and secondary school); and creation of the Faculty of Law.
- 1964: inauguration of the Botanique 43 building, the university's new head office, with university auditoriums; separation of the buildings of the Institut secondaire Saint-Louis and the Faculty.
- 1965: creation of the Faculty of Economic, Social and Political Sciences (ESPO). HEC Saint-Louis and EHSAL become administratively independent from the university but remain located in the university buildings.
- 1969: new name: Facultés universitaires Saint-Louis - Universitaire Faculteiten Sint-Aloysius (FUSL-UFSAL); with the implementation of first courses in Dutch.
- 1973: independence of the Dutch-speaking Universitaire Faculteiten Sint-Aloysius, which together with EHSAL moved to the beginning of rue du Marais; inauguration of the Marais 109 building for the FUSL while the secondary school Institut Saint-Louis moves to a new building on rue du Marais 113.
- 1980: foundation of the Centre for Interdisciplinary Studies of the Brussels Region (CERB); creation of courses with off-shift schedules.
- 1984: HEC Saint-Louis becomes the Institut supérieur de commerce, or ISC Saint-Louis.
- 1991: creation of bilingual French-Dutch programmes in collaboration with Saint-Louis' Dutch-speaking equivalent now called Katholieke Universiteit Brussel.
- 1993: creation of trilingual French-Dutch-English and bilingual French-English programmes in law and social sciences.
- 1995: authorization by decree to organize doctoral theses and postgraduate studies.
- 1996: the ISC Saint-Louis co-founds the new Haute École Groupe "ICHEC - ISC Saint-Louis - ISFSC", a vocational university college.
- 2004: the ISC Saint-Louis is absorbed into the Institut catholique des hautes études commerciales.
- 2004: adhesion to the European Union's Erasmus Charter.
- 2004: foundation of the Académie Louvain.
- 2007: creation of the Institute of European Studies (IEE).
- 2011: inauguration of the 119 Marais building, which now houses the Institute of European Studies and its specialized library.
- 2013: the FUSL become Saint-Louis University, Brussels (Université Saint-Louis - Bruxelles), one of the six universities of the Wallonia-Brussels Federation.
- 2015: creation of the Marie Haps Faculty of Translation and Interpreting, incorporating the bachelor's degrees in translation-interpretation from the Institut libre Marie-Haps (Haute École Vinci) and thus sharing the rue d'Arlon (European district) and Tilleuls (Chaussée de Wavre) campuses with it.
- May 2017: the board of directors of the University of Louvain and the General Assembly of the Saint-Louis University, Brussels decide, with 90% of the votes each, to merge and found the UCLouvain.
- May 2018: inauguration of the Ommegang building by the Brussels Minister Céline Frémault and the Rectors of the Universities of Saint-Louis and Louvain, doubling the surface area of Saint-Louis.

=== Architecture ===
In 2004, a fire destroyed offices and a large part of the historic library building was flooded following the intervention of the fire brigade. A new library was built and inaugurated in 2005, while some elements of the old library remain (including part of the imposing wooden staircase). The university's main library moved to the third and fourth floors of the new Ommegang building in 2018.

In 2015, the university indeed acquired an office building belonging to Belfius bank, the Ommegang, next to the University's building located at 109 rue du Marais, in order to relieve the institution's infrastructure, whose number of students tripled in fifteen years. New lecture theatres were built, including the institution's largest auditorium, a new library, a new multi-purpose room for 1300 people, and a residence with about 100 student apartments. The new facilities are accessible since the 2017 academic year, increasing the surface area of the main Saint-Louis campus from 25,000 m² to 47,000 m².

== Location ==
=== Campus Saint-Louis ===
Saint-Louis University is located on two campuses in Brussels and Ixelles. The main campus, Saint-Louis, with 48 km² of university space, is located in the city centre, between the rue de l'Ommegang and du Marais, as well as the boulevards du Jardin botanique and Pachéco. This tight urban campus is split in two by the Institut secondaire Saint-Louis, forming to the north the "Botanique" and "Préfecture" buildings housing the Institute of European Studies (Marais 119), the university press (Botanique 42), the university's official main building (Botanique 43) and the historical building with the rectorate (Botanique 38) and the former library; and to the south the more recent Marais 109 and Ommegang buildings, where the faculty and student administrations are located, and several large auditoriums.

=== Campus Marie-Haps ===
The courses of the Marie Haps Faculty Translation & Interpreting are given on the Marie-Haps campus, shared with the Haute École Vinci, in Ixelles, in the European quarter, more precisely in front of the European Parliament. The buildings of the Marie-Haps campus are located on either side of rue d'Arlon and historically in the Hôtel Beernaert. The language courses (extra-curricular) are given in an office building further north, between rue d'Arlon and rue de Trèves, where Marie-Haps' Dutch-speaking departments (which have integrated the Erasmushogeschool Brussel and Vlekho) used to be located.

==== Tilleuls site ====
The Marie-Haps Faculty is also located on the Tilleuls site, former Œuvre du Calvaire hospital, which integrated the Saint-Luc University Hospital in UCLouvain Brussels Woluwe in 2003. The Tilleuls site includes a large country house, a caretaker's house, a chapel and the former hospital transformed into classrooms, located on the Chaussée de Wavre.

== Organisation ==
=== Demographic evolution ===
Students enrolled at Saint-Louis University, Brussels on 1 December (excluding doctoral students). The university took the name Université Saint-Louis - Bruxelles instead of FUSL during the 2013–2014 academic year.

=== Faculties ===
- Faculty of Philosophy, Arts and Human Sciences
- Faculty of Law
- Faculty of Economics, Social, Political and Communication Sciences (ESPO)
- Marie Haps Faculty of Translation and Interpreting
- Institute for European Studies (IEE)

Saint-Louis University, Brussels is specialized in undergraduate programmes, for which it has developed unique degrees. For example, it is the only Belgian university organising bilingual or trilingual bachelor's (with its sister university, KU Leuven campus Brussels); Erasmus programmes in social and human sciences; evening schedules; and the possibility of completing double bachelor's degrees in the majority of majors. It is also the only university of the Wallonia-Brussels Federation offering a fully English bachelor's degree; in business engineering.

In total, the university organises 25 Bachelor programmes, two Master's degrees, an Executive master's degree, seven Masters of specialization (postgraduate master's degrees) and more than 20 university certificates of continuing education. Most Master's diplomas and university certificates are double degrees with one or more Belgian or foreign universities.

=== Research centers ===
Since its foundation, Saint-Louis has distinguished itself by its university character, which is to produce knowledge in addition to offering it. The first research centres were set up at the end of the 19th century. In 1995, the decree organizing higher education granted the University the right to organize doctoral theses, further contributing to the expansion of research.

The university organises research through three research institutes:

- Interdisciplinarity and Society Network (RIS)
- Interdisciplinary Research Institute on Brussels (IRIB), formed in 1980, fifteen years before the creation of the Brussels-Capital Region, as the Centre for Interdisciplinary Studies of the Brussels Region (CERB).
- Institute of European Studies (IEE), founded in 2007 and also an independent faculty since 2012.

and various research centers:

- The Belgian Centre for Burgundian Studies 1400-1600
- Centre for Anthropology, Sociology and Psychology: Studies and Research (CASPER)
- Private Law Centre (CePri)
- Research Centre in Economics (CEREC)
- Centre for Research in Political Science (CReSPo)
- Centre for Research in the History of Law, Institutions and Society (CRHiDI)
- Centre for the Study of Environmental Law (CEDRE)
- Centre for Sociological Studies (CES)
- Centre for Innovation and Intellectual Property (CIPI)
- Interdisciplinary Research Centre for Constitutional and Administrative Law (IARC)
- Inter-University Centre for Mobility Studies
- Prospero Centre - Language, image and knowledge
- Research Group on Criminal and Penal Matters (GREPEC)
- Observatory on AIDS and Sexuality
- Research Cluster on Communication and Media (PReCoM)
- Seminar on Applied Mathematics in the Humanities (SMASH)
- Seminar for Linguistics (SeSLa)
- Interdisciplinary Seminar on Legal Studies (SIEJ)
- TranSpheres - Center for Traductology

Saint-Louis University, Brussels has also founded the Brussels Studies Institute together with the two other Brussels universities: Université libre de Bruxelles and Vrije Universiteit Brussel.

=== School of Philosophical and Religious Sciences ===
The School of Philosophical and Religious Sciences, founded in 1925 by cardinal Mercier, is not a research center nor a faculty, but continues to teach and study philosophy, theology and social and human sciences, to which it has been a major contributor. Chairs of the School of Philosophical and Religious Sciences are always public and have included Paul Ricœur, Michel Serres, Philippe Lacoue-Labarthe, Cornelius Castoriadis, Jean-Luc Nancy, Jacques Lacan, Tzvetan Todorov, Alain Touraine and Pierre Bourdieu.

== Notable alumni ==
- Typh Barrow, Belgian singer, songwriter, composer and pianist
- Henry Bauchau, Belgian psychoanalyst, lawyer, and author of French prose and poetry.
- Henry Carton de Wiart, count, 23rd Prime Minister of Belgium.
- Louise Cavenaile, Belgian field hockey player.
- Bernard Coulie, Belgian academic and previous rector of the University of Louvain.
- Benoît Cerexhe, Belgian politician, minister of the Brussels-Capital Region and Mayor of Woluwe-Saint-Pierre.
- Étienne Davignon, businessman, Belgian Minister of State, statesman and former European Commissioner.
- Pierre Daye, first rexist group leader at the Chamber of Representatives, journalist.
- Sylvie Delacroix, British AI data and ethics professor
- Francis Delpérée, Belgian senator and professor of constitutional law at the University of Louvain.
- Henri De Page, Belgian jurist.
- Princess Marie-Esméralda of Belgium, daughter of King Leopold III.
- Pierre Harmel, count, lawyer and 40th Prime Minister of Belgium.
- Jean-Baptiste Janssens (1889–1964), twenty-seventh Superior General of the Society of Jesus.
- Bernard Le Grelle, count, investigative journalist, political adviser, writer, and public affairs executive, known for his long term investigation into the JFK assassination.
- François Ost, baron, philosopher of law and previous vice-chancellor of Saint-Louis University, Brussels.
- Thomas Owen, Belgian fantasy author and member of the Royal Academy of French Language and Literature of Belgium.
- Charles Terlinden, Belgian historian, professor at the Catholic University of Louvain, and papal chamberlain.
- Edmond Thieffry, Belgian First World War air ace and aviation pioneer.
- Françoise Tulkens, lawyer and expert in criminal and penal law, and Vice-President of the European Court of Human Rights.
- Philippe van Parijs, philosopher, professor at Harvard University and at the University of Louvain.
- Michel Weber, philosopher.
