= Institute for Astronomy and Astrophysics =

Astronomy department of the Université Libre de Bruxelles

The Institute for Astronomy and Astrophysics (IAA) in Brussels is a part of the physics department of the Université Libre de Bruxelles. It is an international center of excellence in the field of nuclear astrophysics. The institute's director is currently Prof. Alain Jorissen. The institute is composed of one full professor, five tenured FNRS senior researchers, nine postdoctoral fellows from various countries (Belgium, France, Japan, United Kingdom, Slovakia), and three Ph.D. students (Belgium, Italy).

== Field of research ==
Its research interests involve nuclear astrophysics, stellar evolution, chemical composition of stars, binary stars, neutron stars and modified Newtonian dynamics.

== Achievements ==
The institute has been a leading laboratory in many national and international collaborations. One of these collaborations has led to a world premiere, the direct measurement of a nuclear reaction rate on an unstable target at energies of interest in astrophysics
