= Catholic University of Brussels =

University in Brussels, Belgium

Coordinates: 50°51′45″N 04°19′39″E

The Katholieke Universiteit Brussel (Dutch pronunciation: [kɑtoːˈlikə ʔynivɛrsiˈtɛid ˈbrʏsəl], Catholic University of Brussels) was a Flemish university located in Brussels, founded in 1969 as University Faculties St Aloysius (UFSAL), in many ways the equivalent of a liberal arts college. It split up from the primarily French-speaking Saint-Louis University, Brussels to become an independent Dutch-speaking institution. It became recognised as a university by the Flemish Community of Belgium in the early 1990s. It only ever awarded basic undergraduate degrees, which in the older Belgian system of a four-year licenciate meant students had to go on to other universities to complete their courses of study.

In the late 1990s, as a result of politically fuelled doubts about the university's survival, student levels fell drastically, with a knock-on effect on government funding. In 2007 the university merged with a number of other tertiary institutions in Brussels (see Hogeschool-Universiteit Brussel (HUB, European University College Brussels)), and then had a separate existence only as a legal fiction for accreditation and funding purposes.

In 2013, the academic degrees of the KUB were integrated in the Catholic University of Leuven.

== See also ==
- List of split up universities
