= Haute École Léonard de Vinci =

- Established: 1995
- Religious affiliation: Roman Catholicism
- Students: about 8000
- Location: Brussels, Belgium; 50°50′59.9″N 4°27′13.6″E
- Website: www.vinci.be

The Haute École Léonard de Vinci is a Catholic institution of higher education of the French Community of Belgium, based on 3 campuses (two in Brussels and one in Louvain-la-Neuve). It offers short-type courses (bachelor), long type (master) and specializations in these three sectors:

- Health
- Social studies
- Science and Technology

It was formed in 1995 through the grouping of a number of pre-existent institutions:

- ECAM - École centrale des arts et métiers (an industrial engineering college)
- ENCBW-IESP - École normale catholique du Brabant wallon - Institut d’enseignement supérieur pédagogique (a teacher training college)
- ISEI - Institut Supérieur d'Enseignement Infirmier (a paramedical college)
- IESP2A - Institut d'Enseignement supérieur Parnasse-Deux Alice (a paramedical college), which itself was created through the merger of two Brussels nurse schools:
  - The Institut Parnasse
  - The Institut des Deux-Alice, founded in 1937
- ILMH - Institut libre Marie Haps (a college providing education in translation, psychology, and speech therapy)
- IPL - Institut Paul Lambin (a college for medical and biological technology)

In 2019, ECAM, the school's only department offering Master's studies, left the Haute École Leonard de Vinci to join the Haute École « ICHEC-ISC Saint-Louis-ISFSC », which became ICHEC-ECAM-ISFSC. Following this, the governance of the Haute Ecole Leonard de Vinci has been reviewed in September 2019 and the historical institutions have given way to the three sectors (health; social studies; science and technology).
