= Henri De Page =

Belgian jurist

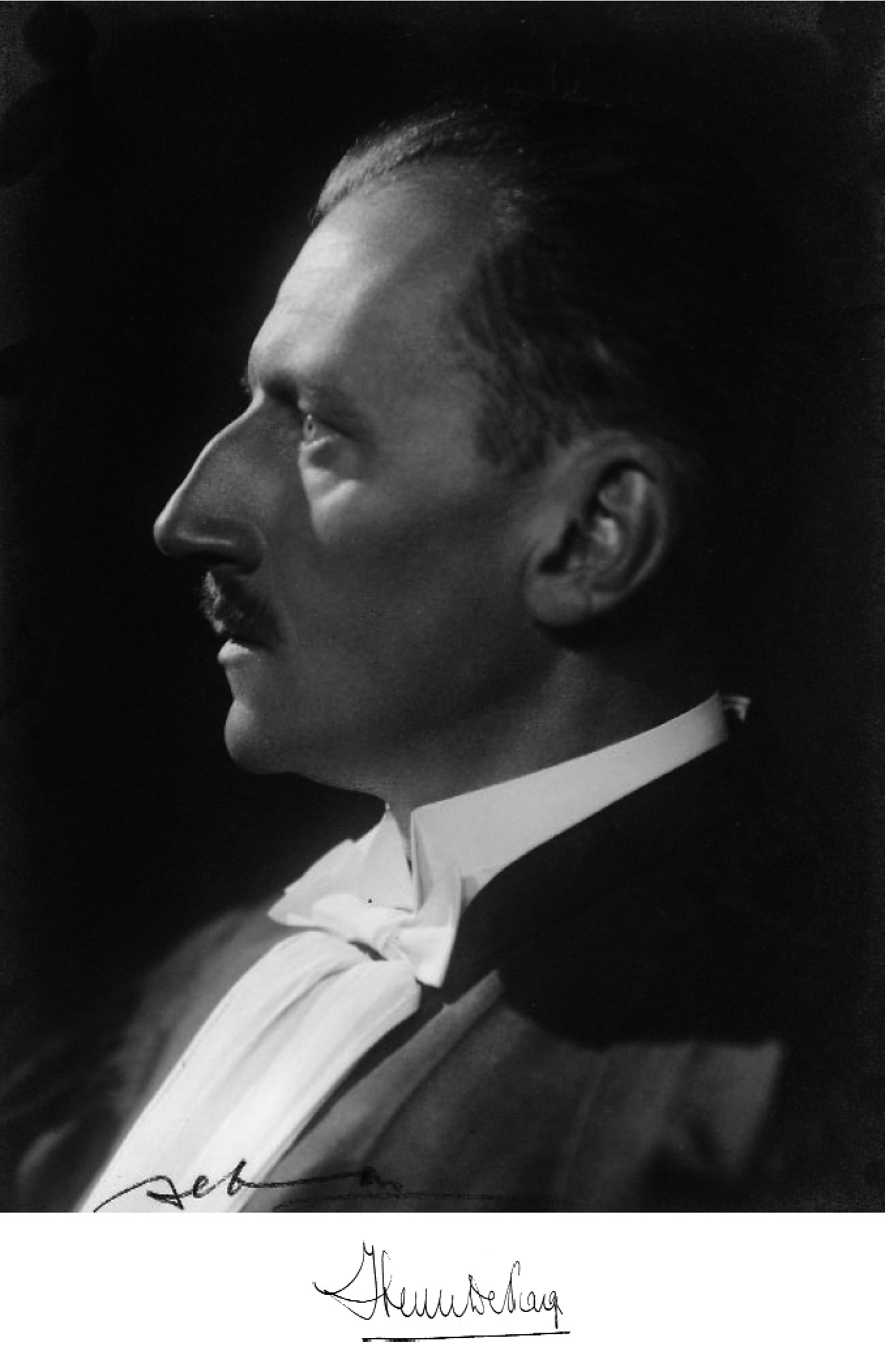
Henri De Page

Henri De Page (1894–1969) was a Belgian jurist.

De Page obtained his doctorate of law at the Free University of Brussels in 1919 and was appointed a magistrate on the Brussels court of first instance. After obtaining a teaching position at the University, he was appointed a professor in 1936.

His principal work was the thirteen-volume Traité élémentaire de droit civil belge (1950), the leading textbook on Belgian civil law. De Page belonged to the École scientifique, also called "la seconde école de l'éxégese" founded before World War I in France by Gény, Esmein, Planiol, Lyon-Caen, Duguit and Hauriou. Where the older École de l'exégese held that law was synonymous to legislation and that the practice of law was the mere application of statutes, the École scientifique was of the opinion that law was a complex entity with many sources, including socio-economic factors.
