= Chaussée de Wavre =

Thoroughfare in Brussels, Belgium

Chaussée de Wavre (French); Waversesteenweg (Dutch)
- Waverse Steenweg (Dutch)
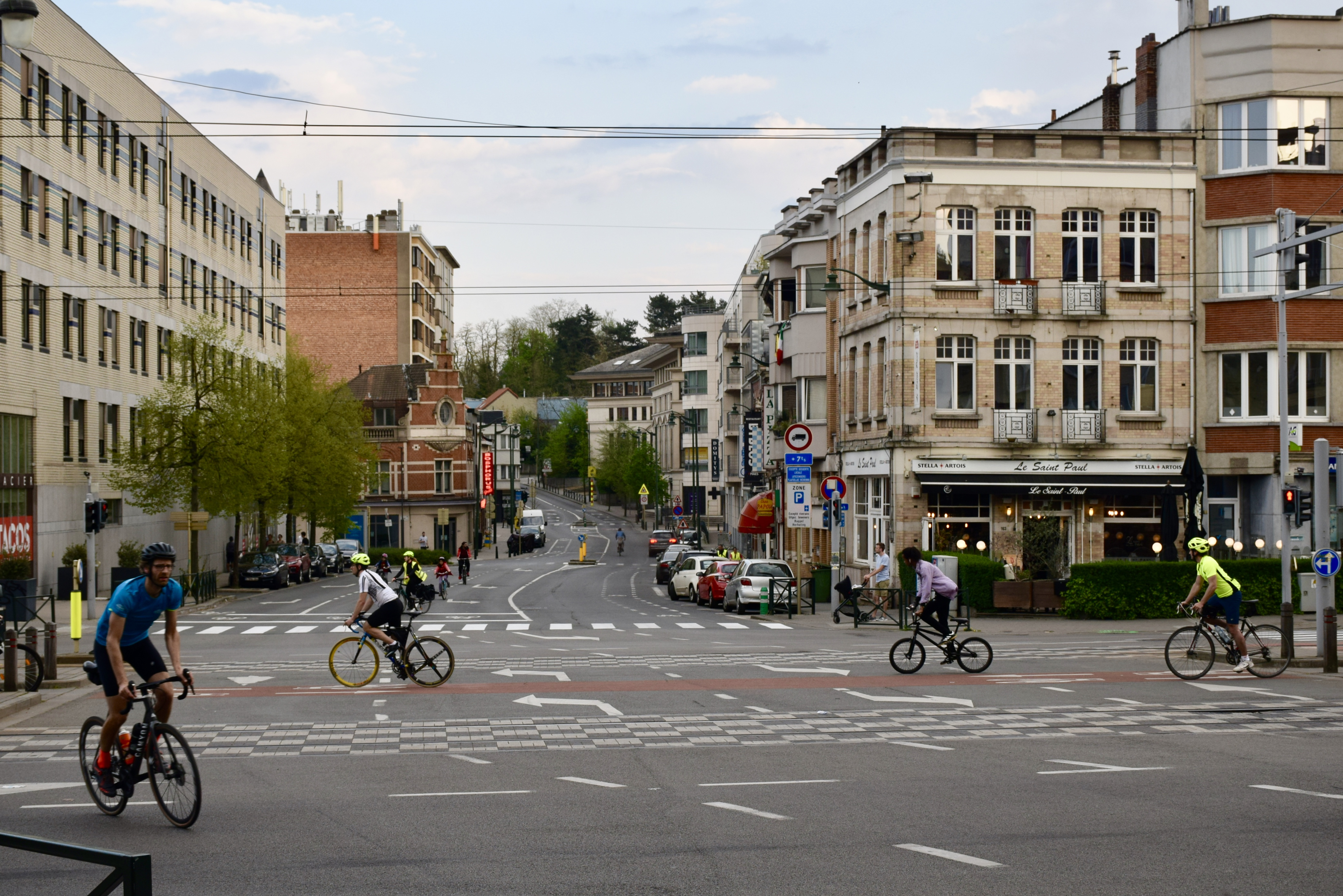
- The crossroad between the Chaussée de Wavre/Waversesteenweg and the Boulevard du Souverain/Vorstlaan

- Location within Brussels Location within Belgium
- Namesake: Wavre
- Type: Chaussee
- Location: Auderghem, Etterbeek and Ixelles, Brussels-Capital Region, Belgium
- Coordinates: 50°50′13″N 4°22′03″E

The Chaussée de Wavre (French, pronounced [ʃo.se d(ə) wavʁ]) or Waversesteenweg (Dutch, pronounced [ˈʋaː.vər.səˌsteːn.ʋɛx]) is a major street in Brussels, Belgium, running through the municipalities of Ixelles, Etterbeek and Auderghem. It starts at a crossroad with the Chaussée d'Ixelles/Elsensesteenweg near the Namur Gate in Ixelles, goes down to the Place Jourdan/Jourdanplein in Etterbeek, then goes up to the La Chasse crossroad, continues to the Arsenal crossroad with the Greater Ring. After this crossroad, the street enters Auderghem, crosses the Boulevard du Souverain/Vorstlaan, then merges with the European route E411 where it runs along the Red Cloister and then the Sonian Forest. At its end, the road crosses the Brussels Ring. This street is part of the N4 road, which connects Brussels to Arlon. It is named after the city of Wavre (Wallonia).

Several places of interest are located on the Chaussée de Wavre, among which the Vendôme cinema, the Museum of Natural Sciences and the Jean-Félix Hap Garden.

== See also ==
- List of streets in Brussels
- History of Brussels
- Belgium in the long nineteenth century
