= Bazancourt, Oise =

Bazancourt
- Commune
- Location of Bazancourt
- Location within France Location within Hauts-de-France
- Coordinates: 49°33′18″N 1°44′10″E
- Country: France
- Region: Hauts-de-France
- Department: Oise
- Arrondissement: Beauvais
- Canton: Grandvilliers
- Intercommunality: Picardie Verte

Government
  - Mayor (2020–2026): Edwige Haudiquert
- Area^{1}: 3.15 km^{2} (1.22 sq mi)
- Elevation: 212 m (696 ft)
- Highest elevation: 201 m (659 ft)
- Lowest elevation: 129 m (423 ft)
- Population (2023): 100
  - Density: 32/km^{2} (82/sq mi)
- Time zone: UTC+01:00 (CET)
  - Summer (DST): UTC+02:00 (CEST)
- INSEE/Postal code: 60049 /60380
- ^{1} French Land Register data, which excludes lakes, ponds, glaciers > 1 km^{2} (0.386 sq mi or 247 acres) and river estuaries.

Bazancourt (French pronunciation: [bazɑ̃kuʁ]) is a commune in the Oise department in northern France.

== Population ==
Historical population
Year	Pop.	±% p.a.
1968	119	—
1975	121	+0.24%
1982	119	−0.24%
1990	120	+0.10%
1999	152	+2.66%
2007	132	−1.75%
2012	126	−0.93%
2017	129	+0.47%
2023	100	−4.16%
Source: INSEE

== See also ==
- Communes of the Oise department
