= Francqui Prize =

Belgian scholarly prize

The Francqui Prize is a Belgian scholarly prize awarded by the Francqui Foundation for significant contributions to science or scholarship. Established in 1933 and named after Émile Francqui, the award is made in recognition of the achievements of a scholar who at the start of the year who at the start of the award is under 50. The prize is awarded in a rotation of the exact sciences, social sciences or humanities, and biological or medical sciences. The prize amount is currently 250,000 euros, of which 80% is directed to the support of the recipient's research program, and the remainder goes to the individual.

Candidates must be associated with a Belgian academic institution, and foreign candidates must have been associated with such an institution for at least ten years. The laureate is selected by an international jury whose members may not be affiliated with a Belgian scientific institution or university at the time of nomination or award.

== Laureates ==
The laureates listed by the Francqui Foundation include:

Year	Laureate	Institution	Field or area
2026	Patrice Cani	UCLouvain	Francqui-Collen biomedical sciences; gut microbiota and metabolism
2026	Diether Lambrechts	KU Leuven	Francqui-Collen biomedical sciences; cancer genomics
2025	Ine Van Hoyweghen	KU Leuven	Humanities; social sciences of biomedical innovation
2024	Veronique Van Speybroeck	Ghent University	Exact sciences; applied physics
2023	Sarah-Maria Fendt	KU Leuven	Francqui-Collen biomedical sciences; fundamental biomedical research
2023	Philippe Lemey	KU Leuven; Rega Institute	Francqui-Collen biomedical sciences; clinical and translational research
2022	Veerle Rots	University of Liège	Humanities; prehistory
2021	Michaël Gillon	University of Liège	Exact sciences; astrobiology
2020	Cédric Blanpain	Université libre de Bruxelles	Francqui-Collen biomedical sciences; fundamental biomedical research
2020	Bart Loeys	University of Antwerp	Francqui-Collen biomedical sciences; clinical and translational research
2019	Laurens Cherchye	KU Leuven Kulak	Humanities; business and economics
2019	Bram De Rock	Université libre de Bruxelles; KU Leuven Kulak	Humanities; economics and business
2019	Frederic Vermeulen	KU Leuven	Humanities; economics
2018	Frank Verstraete	Ghent University; University of Vienna	Exact sciences; mathematical physics and astronomy
2017	Steven Laureys	University of Liège; Liège University Hospital	Biological and medical sciences; coma
2016	Barbara Baert	KU Leuven	Humanities; medieval art and history of Christian art
2015	Stefaan Vaes	KU Leuven	Exact sciences; mathematics
2014	Bart Lambrecht	Ghent University	Biological and medical sciences; immunology and pulmonary disease
2013	Olivier De Schutter	UCLouvain	Humanities; governance theory and human-rights law
2012	Conny Aerts	KU Leuven; Radboud University; Hasselt University	Exact sciences; astronomy and astrophysics
2011	Pierre Vanderhaegen	Université libre de Bruxelles	Biological and medical sciences; neuroscience
2010	François Maniquet	UCLouvain	Humanities; economics
2009	Eric Lambin	UCLouvain	Exact sciences; geography
2008	Michel A. J. Georges	University of Liège	Biological and medical sciences; animal genomics
2007	François de Callataÿ	Royal Library of Belgium	Humanities; history
2006	Pierre Gaspard	Université libre de Bruxelles	Exact sciences; statistical mechanics
2005	Dirk Inzé	Ghent University	Biological and medical sciences; plant systems biology
2004	Marie-Claire Foblets	KU Leuven	Humanities; anthropology
2003	Michel Van den Bergh	Hasselt University; Vrije Universiteit Brussel	Exact sciences; algebra and geometry
2002	Peter Carmeliet	KU Leuven	Biological and medical sciences; transgenic technology and gene therapy
2001	Philippe Van Parijs	UCLouvain	Humanities; social justice philosophy
2000	Marc Henneaux	Université libre de Bruxelles	Exact sciences; theoretical physics
1999	Marc Parmentier	Université libre de Bruxelles	Biological and medical sciences; molecular biology
1998	Mathias Dewatripont	Université libre de Bruxelles	Humanities; economics
1997	Jean-Luc Brédas	University of Mons-Hainaut	Exact sciences; materials chemistry
1996	Etienne Pays	Université libre de Bruxelles	Biological and medical sciences; molecular biology
1995	Claude d'Aspremont Lynden	UCLouvain	Humanities; economics
1994	Eric G. Derouane	UCLouvain	Exact sciences; chemistry and catalysis
1993	Gilbert Vassart	Université libre de Bruxelles	Biological and medical sciences; pathological biochemistry
1992	Géry van Outryve d'Ydewalle	KU Leuven	Humanities; experimental psychology
1991	Jean-Marie André	University of Namur	Exact sciences; applied theoretical chemistry
1990	Thierry Boon	UCLouvain	Biological and medical sciences; immunotherapy
1989	Pierre Pestieau	University of Liège	Humanities; economics and mathematical economics
1988	Pierre van Moerbeke	UCLouvain	Exact sciences; algebraic geometry
1987	Jacques Urbain	Université libre de Bruxelles	Biological and medical sciences; immunology
1986	Marc Wilmet	Université libre de Bruxelles	Humanities; Romance philology and French linguistics
1985	Amand Lucas	University of Namur	Exact sciences; theoretical physics
1984	Désiré Collen	KU Leuven	Biological and medical sciences; biochemistry and molecular biochemistry
1983	Alexis Jacquemin	UCLouvain	Humanities; political and industrial economics
1982	François Englert	Université libre de Bruxelles	Exact sciences; theoretical physics
1981	André Trouet	UCLouvain	Biological and medical sciences; cellular and molecular pathology
1980	Jozef IJsewijn	KU Leuven	Humanities; humanist Latin literature
1979	Jozef Schell	Ghent University	Exact sciences; genetics
1978	Jacques Nihoul	University of Liège	Biological and medical sciences; applied mathematics and theoretical physics
1977	Jacques Taminiaux	UCLouvain	Humanities; history of philosophy and philosophy of art
1976	Walter Fiers	Ghent University	Exact sciences; molecular biology
1975	René Thomas	Université libre de Bruxelles	Biological and medical sciences; chemistry and molecular genetics
1974	Raoul Van Caenegem	Ghent University	Humanities; medieval history and legal history
1973	Pierre Macq	UCLouvain	Exact sciences; experimental nuclear physics
1972	Jean-Edouard Desmedt	Université libre de Bruxelles	Biological and medical sciences; human neurophysiology
1971	Georges Thines	UCLouvain	Humanities; experimental psychology and animal psychology
1970	Radu Balescu	Université libre de Bruxelles	Exact sciences; theoretical and mathematical physics
1969	Isidoor Leusen	Ghent University	Biological and medical sciences; human physiology
1968	Jules Horrent	University of Liège	Humanities; Romance philology
1967	José J. Fripiat	Catholic University of Louvain	Exact sciences; physical chemistry and surface chemistry
1966	Henri G. Hers	Catholic University of Louvain	Biological and medical sciences; biochemistry and physiological chemistry
1965	Roland Mortier	Université libre de Bruxelles	Humanities; French and comparative literature
1964	Paul Ledoux	University of Liège	Exact sciences; theoretical astrophysics
1963	Hubert Chantrenne	Université libre de Bruxelles	Biological and medical sciences; molecular biology
1962	Chaïm Perelman	Université libre de Bruxelles	Humanities; philosophy
1961	Jules Duchesne	University of Liège	Exact sciences; chemistry and molecular physics
1961	Adolphe Van Tiggelen	Catholic University of Louvain	Exact sciences; spectrochemistry and physical chemistry
1960	Christian de Duve	Catholic University of Louvain	Biological and medical sciences; physiological chemistry and biochemistry
1959	Gérard Garitte	Catholic University of Louvain	Humanities; Christian Orientalism and classical philology
1958	Léon Van Hove	Utrecht University	Exact sciences; mathematical sciences and theoretical physics
1957	Lucien Massart	Ghent University	Biological and medical sciences; organic chemistry
1956	Louis Remacle	University of Liège	Humanities; Romance philology
1955	Ilya Prigogine	Université libre de Bruxelles	Exact sciences; chemistry and molecular physics
1954	Raymond Jeener	Université libre de Bruxelles	Biological and medical sciences; animal physiology and biology
1953	Etienne Lamotte	Catholic University of Louvain	Humanities; classical philosophy and Oriental studies
1953	Claire Préaux	Université libre de Bruxelles	Humanities; classical philology
1952	Florent Bureau	University of Liège	Exact sciences; mathematics and algebraic geometry
1951	Henri Koch	KU Leuven	Biological and medical sciences; physiology
1950	Paul Harsin	University of Liège	Humanities; political and social sciences
1949	Léon Rosenfeld	University of Liège	Exact sciences; theoretical physics and nuclear sciences
1948	Jean Brachet	Université libre de Bruxelles	Biological and medical sciences; biology and biophysics
1948	Pol Swings	University of Liège	Exact sciences; physics and spectroscopy
1948	Zénon-M. Bacq	University of Liège	Biological and medical sciences; physiopathology
1948	Marc de Hemptinne	Catholic University of Louvain	Exact sciences; physical and chemical sciences
1948	Léon H. Dupriez	Catholic University of Louvain	Humanities; economics and economic philosophy
1946	Marcel Florkin	University of Liège	Biological and medical sciences; biochemistry and physiological chemistry
1946	Frans-H. van den Dungen	Université libre de Bruxelles	Exact sciences; applied sciences
1946	François-L. Ganshof	Ghent University	Humanities; medieval history
1940	Pierre Nolf	University of Liège	Biological and medical sciences; pathology and biology
1938	Jacques Errera	Université libre de Bruxelles	Exact sciences; nuclear sciences
1936	Franz Cumont	University of Liège	Humanities; classical philology
1934	Georges Lemaître	Catholic University of Louvain	Exact sciences; astrophysics
1933	Henri Pirenne	Ghent University	Humanities; philosophy and letters

== See also ==
- University Foundation
- Belgian American Educational Foundation (BAEF)
- List of general science and technology awards
- List of social sciences awards
