= Biochimica et Biophysica Acta =

- Discipline: Biochemistry
- Language: English

Publication details
- History: 1947–present
- Publisher: Elsevier
- Frequency: 100/year
- Open access: Hybrid

Standard abbreviations
- ISO 4: Biochim. Biophys. Acta

Indexing
- ISSN: 0006-3002

Links
- Journal homepage

Biochimica et Biophysica Acta (BBA) is a peer-reviewed scientific journal in the field of biochemistry and biophysics that was established in 1947. The journal is published by Elsevier with a total of 100 annual issues in ten specialised sections.

== History ==
=== Early years ===
Biochimica et Biophysica Acta was first published in 1947 and was the first international journal to be devoted to the joint fields of biochemistry and biophysics. Published by Elsevier in cooperation with Interscience, it was the first international journal to be launched by Elsevier. The journal first made a profit in 1951.

Early papers were published in English, French, and German, with summaries in all three languages. The majority of papers in the first volume originated in northern and western Europe, with a minority from the US and elsewhere; contributors included William Astbury, Jean Brachet, Hubert Chantrenne, Pierre Desnuelle, Claude Fromageot, Heinz Holter, Raymond Jeener, Felix Haurowitz, Edgar Lederer, Kaj Linderstrøm-Lang, Roger Vendrely, Jean-Marie Wiame, and Ralph W.G. Wyckoff.

Important papers from these early years include "Studies on the structure of ribonucleic acids" by Boris Magasanik and Erwin Chargaff (1951), part of the evidence on which Watson and Crick's model of the structure of DNA was based, and "Enzymic synthesis of deoxyribonucleic acid" by Arthur Kornberg and colleagues (1956), an early report on the isolation of DNA polymerase I. In 1989, in celebration of the journal's thousandth issue, it published contemporary perspectives on some of the key papers published up to 1964.

=== Diversification ===
Early cover of the General Subjects section

Biochimica et Biophysica Acta was published as a single title until 1962, when additional sections began to be published alongside the main journal: first Specialized Section on Nucleic Acids and Related Subjects and then, from 1963, Specialized Section on Enzymological Subjects and Specialized Section on Lipids and Related Subjects.

In 1964, the main journal became Biochimica et Biophysica Acta (BBA) - General Subjects, and was published alongside the three established sections plus Specialized Section on Biophysical Subjects and Specialized Section on Mucoproteins and Mucopolysaccharides. In 1965, the specialist sections were renamed, becoming Biophysics including Photosynthesis, Nucleic Acids and Protein Synthesis, Enzymology and Biological Oxidation, Lipids and Lipid Metabolism and Mucoproteins and Mucopolysaccharides (ceased in 1965). In 1967, Biophysics including Photosynthesis split into Bioenergetics and Biomembranes, and Enzymology and Biological Oxidation split into Enzymology and Protein Structure; the latter pair rejoined in 1982 to become Protein Structure and Molecular Enzymology. Further sections were Molecular Cell Research, launched in 1982, and Molecular Basis of Disease, launched in 1990.

In addition to the specialised research sections, three review sections were launched in the early 1970s: Reviews on Biomembranes (1972–2000), Reviews on Bioenergetics (1973–87) and Reviews on Cancer (from 1974). The former two were later incorporated into the respective research sections.

Further name changes are given in the table in the following section.

== Modern journal ==
As of 2014, Biochimica et Biophysica Acta encompasses ten specialised sections with a total of 100 annual issues in ten volumes. Over 16,000 pages were published in 2011. The journal sections are published separately, with one annual volume per section (two for Reviews on Cancer), but form part of the volume numbering for Biochimica et Biophysica Acta. Sections are available individually or as part of a combined subscription. All papers are in English. The overall editor-in-chief is Ulrich Brandt (Goethe University Frankfurt, Germany).

The sections published in 2014 were as follows:

Name	ISSN	Annual issues	Impact factor	Notes
BBA – Bioenergetics	ISSN 0005-2728	12	4.428	Commenced 1967; formerly part of BBA – Biophysics including Photosynthesis (1965–1966). Incorporates BBA – Reviews on Bioenergetics
BBA – Biomembranes	ISSN 0005-2736	12	4.019	Commenced 1967; formerly part of BBA – Biophysics including Photosynthesis (1965–66). Incorporates BBA – Reviews on Biomembranes
BBA – Gene Regulatory Mechanisms	ISSN 1874-9399	12	6.304	Commenced 2008; continuation of BBA – Gene Structure and Expression (0167-4781; 1982–2007), BBA – Nucleic Acids and Protein Synthesis (1963–1981) and BBA – Specialized Section on Nucleic Acids and Related Subjects (1962–64)
BBA – General Subjects	ISSN 0304-4165	12	4.117	Commenced 1964; continuation of Biochimica et Biophysica Acta
BBA – Molecular and Cell Biology of Lipids	ISSN 1388-1981	12	5.228	Commenced 1998; continuation of BBA – Lipids and Lipid Metabolism (1965–98) and BBA – Specialized Section on Lipids and Related Subjects (1963–64)
BBA – Molecular Basis of Disease	ISSN 0925-4439	12	6.633	Commenced 1990
BBA – Molecular Cell Research	ISSN 0167-4889	12	5.011	Commenced 1982
BBA – Proteins and Proteomics	ISSN 1570-9639	12	4.125	Commenced 2002; continuation of BBA – Protein Structure and Molecular Enzymology (1982–2002), BBA – Enzymology (1967–81), BBA – Protein Structure (1967–81), BBA – Enzymology and Biological Oxidation (1965–66), BBA – Specialized Section on Enzymological Subjects (1963–64)
BBA – Reviews on Cancer	ISSN 0304-419X	4	11.414	Commenced 1974

=== Indexing and online journal ===
BBA is abstracted and indexed by BIOSIS, Chemical Abstracts Service, Current Contents/Life Sciences, EMBASE, EMBiology, Index Chemicus, MEDLINE/Index Medicus, Science Citation Index, and Sociedad Iberoamericana de Informacion Cientifica.

Articles are available online as PDFs and HTML; access is largely limited to subscribers, with a small number of sponsored open-access articles.
