= Brachet =

Brachet can be an archaic term for a female hunting hound. See brachet.

It is also a surname. Notable people with the surname include:

- Albert Brachet (1869–1930), Belgian physician and professor of anatomy and embryology
- Gérard Brachet (born 1944), French space scientist
- Jean Brachet (1909–1988), Belgian biochemist

== See also ==
- Braquet
