= Cédric Blanpain =

Belgian physician

The Baron Blanpain
- Born: 6 September 1970; Uccle, Belgium
- Education: Université libre de Bruxelles (MD/PhD)
- Awards: Outstanding Young Investigator Award ISSCR Prix Quinquennal FNRS
- Scientific career
- Fields: Cancer stem cell; Developmental biology; Cardiac Development; Biomedical research; Translational research
- Workplaces: Howard Hughes Medical Institute, Rockefeller University; IRIBHM, Université Libre de Bruxelles

Cédric, Baron Blanpain (born 6 September 1970) is a Belgian researcher in the field of stem cells (embryology, tissue homeostasis and cancer). He is a tenured professor of developmental biology and genetics at Université libre de Bruxelles and director of the stem cell and cancer lab at its Faculty of Medicine. He was one of the first researchers in the world to use cell lineage tracing in cancer research and he showed for the first time the existence of cancer stem cells in solid tumors in vivo. He was selected by Nature as one of 10 People who mattered most in 2012 and he received the outstanding young investigator award of the International Society for Stem Cell Research.

== Biography ==
Born in Uccle in 1970. Cedric Blanpain attended Collège Saint-Hubert for his secondary education. Graduating in 1987, he started medical school with an aim of becoming a psychiatrist. As soon as his first year, he started doing research in human physiology at the Institut de Recherche Inter-Disciplinaire en Biologie Moléculaire and was thereafter introduced to molecular biology by Gilbert Vassart, the director of the IRIBHM.

After graduating summa cum laude from medical school in 1995, Cedric Blanpain started a specialization in internal medicine. In the third year, he interrupted his clinical education to focus on research. He did his PhD in the lab of Marc Parmentier, dedicated to the study of G-protein coupled receptors. During this period, the Parmentier lab characterized the CCR5 GPCR and discovered its role as a co-receptor in HIV infection. Cedric Blanpain earned his PhD in 2001 for his work on CCR5 and HIV infection and received the 2002 Galen Award of Pharmacology in recognition of his graduate work.

After earning his PhD, Cedric Blanpain went back to finish his board certification in internal medicine, sub-specializing in genetics. From there on, his career would be entirely dedicated to research. In 2002, he earned a fellowship from the Belgian American Educational Foundation to study in the USA (Boat of 2002). He did his post-doc with Elaine Fuchs (a lifelong mentor) at the Laboratory of Mammalian Cell Biology and Development of Rockefeller University, studying epidermal stem cells and tissue differentiation. The Fuchs lab was one of the few labs then studying epidermal stem cells. He was also a long-term fellow of NATO and the Human Frontier Science Program during this period.

In 2006, he accepted an offer from the Belgian National Research Fund to become an independent group leader at his home institute, the IRIBHM. He established the stem cells and cancer lab at ULB, becoming professor in 2013. He received a starting grant from the ERC in 2008 and a consolidator grant in 2014. He received a career development award from the Human Frontier Science Program. Since 2011, he is also an investigator of the Walloon Excellence in Life Science and Biotechnology (WELBIO). He pioneered the use of lineage tracing in cancer research. Ever since establishing his lab, Blanpain received several international awards, including the EMBO Young Investigator Award and the Liliane Bettencourt Prize for Life Sciences in 2012.

He has also written several authoritative reviews on stem cells for journals such as Cell, Science, Cell Stem Cell and Nature.

== Research ==
=== Cancer cell of origin, tumor stem cells and heterogeneity ===
The Blanpain lab has been studying the cells at the origin of epithelial tumors as well as the role and the mechanisms by which cancer stem cells regulate tumor growth and relapse after therapy.

His lab showed that basal cell carcinoma stem from cells of the interfollicular epidermis and infundibulum rather than hair follicles. In 2018, his lab identified the cell population in basal cell carcinoma that mediates vismodegib resistance. They also showed that the administration of Vismodegib in combination with a Wnt inhibitor leads to tumor eradication, a potential new strategy against BCC.

They defined for the first time the quantitative dynamics of tumor initiation at the single cell level from the activation of the oncogene to the development of invasive tumors and demonstrated that the capacity of oncogene expressing cells to induce tumor formation depends on the specific clonal dynamics of the oncogene targeted stem cells at the origin of the cancer.

The Blanpain lab has been studying the different cell states of the epithelio-mesenchymental transition that invasive tumor undergo: they demonstrated that different epidermal stem cells are responsible for invasive squamous cell carcinoma, that hair follicle lineage is primed to undergo EMT during tumorigenesis. They characterized the different transitional states of tumor cells during EMT, in particular they showed that specific subpopulations have higher potential to undergo EMT and metastasize. By screening a large panel of cell surface markers, Blanpain and colleagues identified the existence of different tumor subpopulations in skin and mammary primary tumors associated with different stages of EMT from epithelial to completely mesenchymal states passing through intermediate hybrid states. Although all EMT subpopulations presented similar tumor propagating cell capacity, they displayed different cellular plasticity, invasive and metastatic potential.

The lab also showed the role of PIK3CA in inducing heterogeneity in breast tumors, especially its role in reprogramming basal cells into luminal ones and vice versa. They showed that cell fate reprograming during tumorigenesis correlated with the cell of origin, tumor type and different clinical outcomes of breast tumors.

His team showed the first experimental evidence for the existence of cancer stem cells during unperturbed solid tumor growth in vivo. They also showed the role of VEGF in regulating cancer stem cells.

In squamous cell carcinoma, his group also identified a novel population of cancer stem cells in skin cancers expressing Sox2, they demonstrated by lineage ablation that Sox2 cancer stem cells are essential for tumor initiation and progression in primary tumors and identified the gene network regulated by Sox2 in primary tumour cells in vivo as well as several direct Sox2 target genes controlling critical tumor functions. They also demonstrated the role of the Twist1 gene in cancer for tumor maintenance and growth, within squamous cell carcinoma again.

=== Breast Gland Development ===
Using lineage tracing of basal cells and luminary mammary gland cells during embryonic development and post-natal development, the Blanpain lab showed that different mammary tissue lineages stem from multipotent embryonic progenitors. These multipotent progenitors are replaced soon after birth by unipotent stem cells. His group developed new techniques to perform quantitative lineage tracing to unravel the multilineage differentiation potential of stem cells during development and adult homeostasis. Using novel lineage tracing strategies, they demonstrated that ER positive cells in the mammary gland developed and are maintained in adult gland through unipotent progenitors that are restricted to hormone receptor expressing cells. The differentiation of the multipotent progenitors into basal cells is mediated through p63 activation. Finally, these multipotent progenitors express similar genes as breast tissue tumors (e.g. Sox11, Stmn1 and Mdk), showing that reactivation of multipotency is involved in tumorigenesis.

=== Epithelial stem cells ===
After he started work at the Fuchs lab, Blanpain was part of a world-first: isolating stem cells based on their quiescence using histone H2B-fluorescent protein. The paper, cited more than 1900 times, has been seminal in subsequent work on stem cells. Using monoclonal antibodies, Blanpain managed to isolate hair follicle bulge stem cells and demonstrated their multi-potency (the fact that a single bulge stem cell can differentiate into all epidermal cell lineages). He also transplanted these mouse HF stem cells through grafts, leading to hair growth. Furthermore, he co-authored several papers characterizing the role of Wnt/Beta-Catenin stabilization in precocious bulge stem cell activation and the role of Notch signaling pathway in promoting spine cell development.

=== CCR5 and HIV ===
Cedric Blanpain started his research career working on the CCR5 co-receptor which had been characterized by the Parmentier lab. He worked on understanding the function of the receptor and how the HIV interacts with it. The young researcher showed that endocytosis of the HIV is essential to the cell's infection. He was able to find the first chemokine antagonist to the receptor as well as antibodies that could mediate the oligomerization of the receptor. He also studied the Delta32 inactivating allele of CCR5 which prevents HIV infection

== Awards and honors ==
- Member of the Royal Academy of Medicine of Belgium
- Member of Academia Europaea
- Long-Term Fellowship (2003-2006) and Career Development Award (2006-2009) Human Science Frontier Program
- Two ERC grants: Starting 2008-2013 (CancerStem) and Consolidator 2014-2018 (EXPAND)
- EMBO Young Investigator Award
- Outstanding Young Investigator Award of the ISSCR 2012
- Fondation ULB award 2010
- Joseph Maisin Award for basic biomedical Science- “Prix Quinquennal’’ Belgian National Scientific Research Fund (FNRS) 2015.
- Principal investigator of the Walloon Excellence in Life Science and Biothechnology (WELBIO) since 2011
- Fondation Leducq 22q11 Deletion Syndrome Grant
- Liliane Bettencourt award for life sciences 2012
- Nature: “10 scientists who mattered most in 2012”
- Bauchau Chair award 2012
- Fond Gaston Ithier Award 2010
- Research Fellowship of the NATO (2002-2003)
- Collen Research Fellowship of the Belgian American Educational Foundation (2002-2003)
- Galien Award in Pharmacology 2001
- Prix Fleurice Mercier 1992 (medical school valedictorian)
- Leopold Griffuel Prize 2023
- Elevated to the nobility rank of Baron by King Philip in 2022
