= Włodzimierz Marek Tulczyjew =

Polish physicist and mathematician (1931–2022)

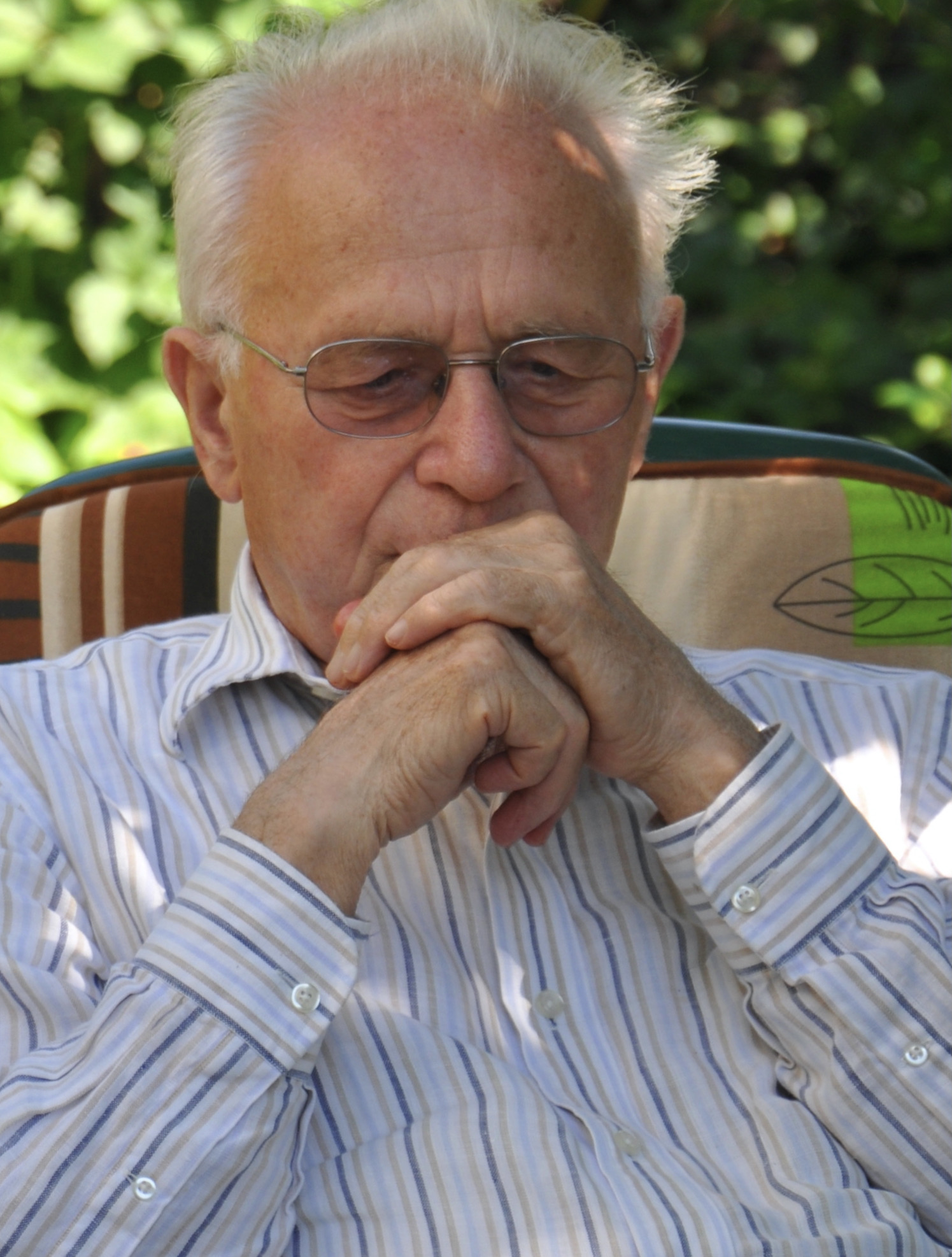
- Włodzimierz Marek Tulczyjew
- Born: 18 June 1931
- Died: 4 December 2022 (aged 91)
- Scientific career
- Fields: Physicist and mathematician

Notes
- University of Camerino professor

Włodzimierz Marek Tulczyjew (18 June 1931 – 4 December 2022) was a Polish-Italian physicist and mathematician, known for his contributions to the geometric formulation of classical mechanics and field theory. He was a professor emeritus of mathematical methods of physics at the University of Camerino and a member of the Academy of Sciences of Turin.

== Biography ==
Tulczyjew was born in Włodawa, a small town in eastern Poland, in 1931. From 1933 to 1943, he lived in Ostrów Lubelski, where his father worked as an accountant. In 1943, he was deported with his family to Germany, where he worked in an armaments factory. In June 1945, he returned to Lublin. Later on he moved to Warsaw where, in 1952, he graduated with a diploma from the State Telecommunication Technical School.

From 1952 to 1956, he studied in the Faculty of Mathematics and Physics at the University of Warsaw. During his studies, Tulczyjew joined a group centered around Leopold Infeld (Jerzy Plebański, Andrzej Trautman, Iwo Białynicki-Birula, Stanisław Bażański, and others). He obtained his Ph.D. in 1959 and his D.Sc. in 1965 at the University of Warsaw under the supervision of Andrzej Trautman. Then he became an assistant professor there. Tulczyjew's research was highly valued by Infeld, who, in his posthumously published memoirs, referred to Włodek as his most outstanding student. After Infeld's death (January 15, 1968), Tulczyjew decided to emigrate. He left Poland on September 28, 1968, and through Rome reached Canada, at the University of Calgary.

In the late 1980s, Tulczyjew took early retirement in Canada and relocated to Camerino, Italy. He was appointed as a professor per chiara fama (a distinguished position) of Mathematical Methods of Physics at the University of Camerino. He soon began collaborating with Giuseppe Marmo, a professor at Federico II University in Naples, and with the National Institute of Nuclear Physics.

In the 2000s, he initiated new collaborations with scholars at the University of Bari, including Fiorella Barone and Margherita Barile, and mentored a PhD student, Antonio De Nicola.

He retired in 2006, but remained active in research and teaching until his death in 2022.

== Scientific work ==
Tulczyjew's main research interest was the geometry of classical mechanics and field theory, especially the symplectic and multisymplectic structures that underlie the Hamiltonian and Lagrangian formulations, and the Legendre transformation that connects them. Among his notable contributions are the Tulczyjew triple, the Tulczyjew symplectic structure, the Tulczyjew-Dedecker differential, and the Tulczyjew isomorphism. He also worked on general relativity, gauge theories, quantum mechanics, and differential geometry.

In his habilitation thesis, Tulczyjew presented a scheme of relativistic quantum mechanics as a scattering theory, where antiparticles are described as particles moving backward in time. His work prefigured geometric quantization, later developed by Jean-Marie Souriau and Bertram Kostant. Tulczyjew was also one of the first to recognize the relationship between Utiyama's theory and Yang-Mills field theory. Seeking the proper formulation of relativistic quantum mechanics led him back to the foundations of classical theories, especially to classical mechanics and the fundamentals of variational calculus (or rather the variational description of physical systems).

Tulczyjew's approach to relativistic quantum mechanics led him to revisit the foundations of classical mechanics and the variational calculus, where he sought a geometric formulation. His work inspired several colleagues, particularly at the University of Warsaw, to explore multisymplectic geometry and its applications in variational calculus. Notable collaborators include Jerzy Kijowski, Wiktor Szczyrba, Jacek Komorowski, and Krzysztof Gawędzki.

During his time in Canada, Tulczyjew continued to work on the dynamics of charged particles and the inverse problem of variational calculus, which seeks the conditions for a system of partial differential equations to be derived from a Lagrangian. He solved this problem by constructing a double variational complex and proving Poincaré's Lemma for this structure. His work was highly regarded by contemporaries such as André Lichnerowicz, Alexandre Vinogradov, Paul Dedecker. Ian Anderson attributed the discovery of the variational bicomplex to both Tulczyjew and Vinogradov independently.

In 1974, Tulczyjew published a seminal paper on Hamiltonian and Lagrangian systems, providing a full geometric interpretation of the Legendre transformation. Later on, Tulczyjew formulated his innovative vision of variational principles in physics by providing a conceptual framework. The basic geometric structure associated with the Legendre transformation is now known as the Tulczyjew triple. Among his contributions to mathematical physics, Tulczyjew, in collaboration with Maria Rosa Menzio, developed an approach linking Lagrangian and Hamiltonian mechanics via symplectic structures, involving the Tulczyjew map. Tulczyjew's contributions were recognized internationally, and in 1981, he was elected as a foreign member of the Accademia delle Scienze di Torino.

Tulczyjew published around 100 scientific papers and several books, including A symplectic framework for field theories (1979), and Geometric Formulation of Physical Theories (1989). He collaborated with many distinguished mathematicians and physicists.

== Honors and awards ==
Tulczyjew was elected as a member of several academies and societies, such as:

- The Academy of Sciences of Turin (1981).
- The Polish Academy of Sciences (1990).
- The Gold Cross of Merit awarded by the President of Poland (2014).
