= Peter Carmeliet =

Belgian physician and professor

- Born: 8 December 1959 (age 66)
- Education: KU Leuven
- Awards: Ernst Jung Prize; Heineken Prize for Medicine
- Scientific career
- Fields: angiogenesis
- Workplaces: KU Leuven; VIB
- Doctoral students: Diether Lambrechts

Peter, Baron Carmeliet (Dutch: [ˈpeːtər ˈkɑrməlit]; born 8 December 1959) is a Belgian physician and professor at the Katholieke Universiteit Leuven (Leuven, Belgium). He is also Adjunct Director of the VIB Vesalius Research Center, KU Leuven. Among his research interests are vasculogenesis, angiogenesis, and vascular endothelial growth factor (VEGF). In 2016, Carmeliet identified neuron-producing stem cells in the brain.

Carmeliet was elected a foreign member of the Royal Netherlands Academy of Arts and Sciences in 2017. By the number of citations, he is the most cited author of Nature Medicine.

== Awards ==
- 2002: Francqui Prize on Biological and Medical Sciences.
- 2005: Interbrew-Baillet Latour Health Prize, together with Désiré Collen.
- 2010: Ernst Jung Prize in Medicine.
- 2018: Heineken Prize for Medicine
