= Horrent =

Horrent is a French surname. Notable people with the surname:

- Claire Horrent (1909–1998), French swimmer
- Jules Horrent (1920–1981), Belgian scientist
