= Van Den Dungen =

Van Den Dungen is a Dutch surname. Notable people with the surname include:

- Cassi Van Den Dungen (born 1992), Australian model
- Frans-H. van den Dungen (1898–1965), Belgian scientist and academic
