= René Thomas (biologist) =

Belgian scientist

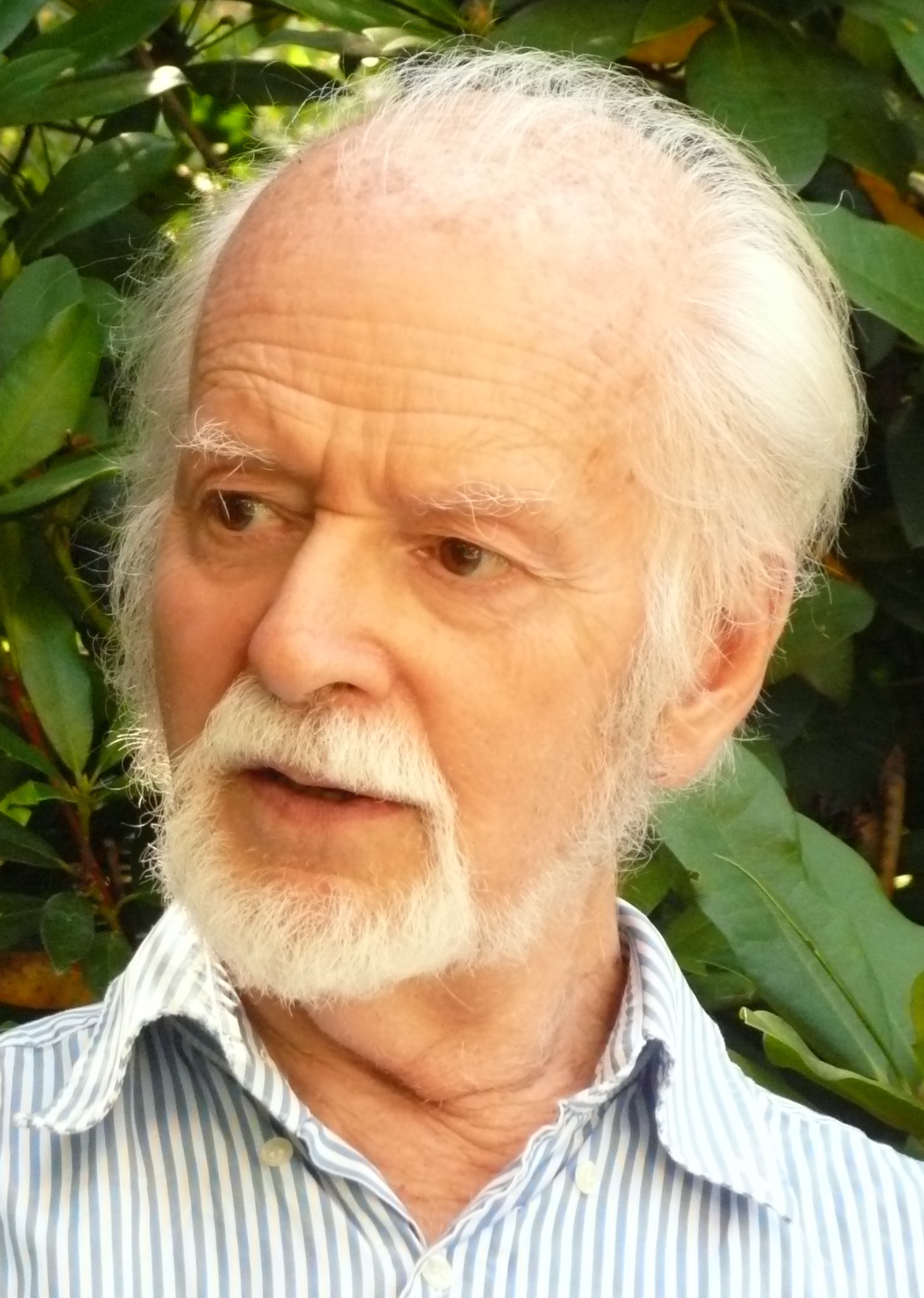
- Born: 14 May 1928; Ixelles, Belgium
- Died: 9 January 2017 (aged 88); Rixensart, Belgium
- Education: Université Libre de Bruxelles
- Known for: DNA Denaturation; Positive gene regulation Gene regulatory cascades Kinetic Logic; Labyrinth chaos
- Awards: Francqui Prize (1975) Quinquennal FNRS Prize (1981-1985) Gold Medal of the French Academy of Sciences (1999)
- Scientific career
- Fields: Biology
- Workplaces: Université Libre de Bruxelles
- Doctoral advisor: Jean Brachet

René Thomas (14 May 1928 (Ixelles) - 9 January 2017 (Rixensart) was a Belgian scientist. His research included DNA biochemistry and biophysics, genetics, mathematical biology, and finally dynamical systems. He devoted his life to the deciphering of key logical principles at the basis of the behaviour of biological systems, and more generally to the generation of complex dynamical behaviour. He was professor and laboratory head at the Université libre de Bruxelles (ULB), and taught and inspired several generations of researchers.

== Biography ==
René Thomas was born on 14 May 1928, in Brussels, Belgium. His parents were the poet Lucien-Paul Thomas and Marieke Vandenbergh. He was the youngest of three siblings further including Anny and André Thomas. René Thomas was the father of three children: Isabelle, Pierre and Anne. He spent his childhood in La Hulpe, Belgium. Very young, he was already fascinated by biology and published his first scientific article at the age of 13 years old. He continued his studies at the Royal Athenaeum of Ixelles (Brussels), and at the ULB, where he studied chemistry.

At ULB, Thomas attended lectures by Jean Brachet, who pioneered the field of nucleic acids (DNA and RNA) and their role in heredity and protein synthesis. Under Brachet's supervision, Thomas prepared and defended a PhD thesis on the denaturation of DNA in 1952.

After two years of postdoctoral training in the laboratories of Harriet Ephrussi (Paris, France, 1953–1954) and of Alfred Hershey (Cold Spring Harbor, USA, 1957–1958), Thomas returned to ULB in 1958, where he was appointed to lecture on Genetics. In 1961, he was appointed director of the Laboratory of Genetics of the ULB.

Thomas' career was attested by a number of prestigious awards, including the Francqui prize in 1975, the five-year prize of the Belgian National Funds for Scientific Research (FNRS) in 1985 for his discoveries on DNA, genetic transformation of bacteria and bacteriophages and the Grande Médaille from the French Academy of Sciences in 1999. He was elected as a member of the Royal Academy of Sciences of Belgium in 1986.

In addition to biology, Thomas had various passions, including mountain climbing, mathematics, music, and astronomy. During his youth, he spent much of his free time climbing, particularly in Freyr, high Valais, Ecrins and Dolomites. He was an amateur oboe player and a great admirer of Joseph Haydn. More recently he became deeply interested in the theory of music, particularly in musical temperaments. The reading of the writing of Lewis Carol on logics triggered his interest into more formal approaches. Likewise, his research work covered a wide range of distinct topics, all of which were driven by the same conviction that it will not be possible to understand complex systems without understanding the logic of simpler ones.

== Main scientific discoveries ==
=== DNA denaturation ===
Thomas discovered that the UV absorption of native DNA is far lower than expected from a "theoretical" spectrum built from the extinction coefficients of its component nucleotides. This gap disappears after mild treatments such as lower or higher pH, higher temperature, or lower ionic strength, especially lower concentration of divalent cations. These preserve the inter-nucleotide bonds that maintain the DNA structure, implying that the nitrogenous bases, responsible for the UV absorbance, interact by weak bonds (Hydrogen bonds or Van der Waals forces), contributing a labile secondary structure to DNA. Melting this secondary structure was coined DNA denaturation, by analogy with the similar process long known for proteins. Once the detailed nature of the secondary structure of DNA was elucidated by Francis Crick, James Watson, Rosalind Franklin and Maurice Wilkins, DNA denaturation could be understood as the unwinding of the double helix.

It became fundamental in all processes that use DNA amplification, e.g. DNA sequencing, molecular cloning and Polymerase Chain Reaction whether for fundamental purposes or for applications to gene therapy and judicial enquiries.

=== Positive control of gene expression ===
Work by François Jacob, André Lwoff, Jacques Monod and Elie Wollman demonstrated the existence of regulatory genes that negatively control the expression of other (target) genes, which are silenced by the product of the regulatory gene, the repressor. Contrary to the general assumption at the time that all genetic regulations would be negative, Thomas showed that genetic regulation can also be positive, i.e., that the products of some regulatory genes can directly activate target genes.

The experiments that led to this discovery involved bacteria and their viruses, the bacteriophages (or phages). Some bacteriophages can integrate their DNA genome in the bacterial genome, where it remains latent (a state called "prophage") due to the repression of all viral genes by the product of a bacteriophage regulatory gene. In this respect, Thomas demonstrated that the replication of the virus is directly blocked by the repressor ("Thomas-Bertani effect").

Thomas further discovered that some of the genes of the prophage, even though they are negatively regulated by the prophage's repressor, can be activated after infection of the bacterium by another, closely related virus ("superinfection"). This demonstrated that regulatory genes can activate target genes ("transactivation"), despite the repression caused by a negative regulator.

Thomas identified two positive regulators in phage lambda, the products of genes N and Q. He showed that these regulatory products act sequentially to activate the expression of most other lambda genes.

The existence of positive regulation and that of regulatory cascades were later found to play essential roles in the development of all multicellular organisms, including humans. In the meantime, the complexity of lambda regulation led Thomas to initiate a logical analysis of the behaviour of genetic regulatory networks, his second major contribution to our understanding of gene regulation.

=== Logical description, analysis and synthesis of complex networks ===
The intricacies of the regulatory network controlling the decision between lysis and lysogeny by bacteriophage lambda led Thomas to realise that understanding phage behaviour based on the sole intuition became very difficult. He therefore looked for means to model this network and formalise its dynamical analysis. He came across Boolean algebra and its application to the design and analysis of electronic circuits. As Boolean algebra deals with variables taking only two values (0/OFF or 1/ON) and simple logical operators such as AND, OR, and NOT, it is particularly well suited to formalise the reasoning process of geneticists, e.g. statements such as "this gene will be ON only if such regulatory factor (activator) is present and if this other factor (inhibitor) is absent". Thomas learned how to use the Boolean formalism by attending classes of his colleague Jean Florine at the Université libre de Bruxelles.

Stimulated by the work of François Jacob and Jacques Monod on bacterial gene regulation, a few other theoreticians had the idea of applying Boolean algebra to the modelling of gene networks, including Mitoyosi Sugita and Stuart Kauffman.

With the help of the physicist Philippe Van Ham, the chemist Jean Richelle, and the mathematician El Houssine Snoussi, Thomas then focused on the logical modelling of relatively small regulatory networks (including the one controlling bacteriophage lambda development), using a more complex asynchronous updating scheme, and considering various refinements of the logical formalism: introduction of multi-level variables, explicit consideration of threshold values, and definition of logical parameters corresponding to the kinetic parameters used in the differential formalism.

In its present form, the logical modelling approach developed by Thomas and collaborators relies on the delineation of a "regulatory graph", where nodes (vertices) represent regulatory components (e.g. regulatory genes or proteins) and signed arcs (positive or negative) represent regulatory interactions (activations or inhibitions). This graph representation is further associated with logical rules (or logical parameters), which specify how each node is affected by different combinations of regulatory inputs.

The dynamical behaviour of a logical model can further be represented in terms of a "state transition graph", where the nodes denote states, i.e. vectors of values for the different components of the regulatory networks, and the arrows denote transitions between states, according to the logical rules.

During the last decades, Thomas' logical modelling approach has been implemented in efficient computer programs, thereby enabling the modelling and analysis of larger models. It has been applied to networks controlling various kinds of biological processes, including virus infection and multiplication, immune cell differentiation, pattern formation in developing animals and plants, mammalian cell signalling, cell cycle, and cell fate decisions.

=== Positive and negative circuits ===
The analyses of genetic network models, led Thomas to realise that "regulatory circuits", defined as simple circular paths in the regulatory graphs (cf. above), are playing crucial dynamical roles. This in turn allowed him to distinguish two classes of regulatory circuits, namely positive versus negative circuits, associated with different dynamical and biological properties. On the one hand, positive circuits, involving an even number of negative interactions (or none) can lead to the coexistence of multiple dynamical regimes. On the other hand, negative circuits, involving an odd number of negative interactions, can generate oscillatory behaviour or homeostasis.

In a further step, considering the regulatory graph associated with a gene network, modelled in terms of logical or differential formalism, Thomas proposed general rules stating that (i) a positive circuit is necessary to display multiple stable states, and (ii) a negative circuit is necessary to have robust sustained oscillations. This has major biological implications since, as first pointed out by Max Delbrück and amply confirmed since, cell differentiation essentially results from successive choices between multiple steady states. Thus, any model for a differentiation process has to involve at least one positive circuit.

The rules proposed by Thomas have inspired various mathematicians, who translated them into rigorous theorems, first referring to ordinary differential equations, but also referring to Boolean and multilevel logical formalisms. This is one of the few cases where biological studies led to the formulation and demonstration of general mathematical theorems.

The theoretical studies by Thomas on the properties of genetic regulatory circuits were also accompanied by practical considerations regarding the synthesis of novel circuits, with specific properties, in the bacterium E. coli. However, due to various technical problems, the attempts of Thomas' group to build synthetic gene circuits were unsuccessful. It is only at the turn of the millennium that several groups reported the successful synthesis of simple positive circuits ("toggle switch") and negative circuits ("repressillator" and auto-inhibitory loop).

=== From the logical viewpoint back to the differential viewpoint ===
Once the dynamical properties of complex sets of circuits had been disentangled in logical terms, it was tempting to come back to a more usual and quantitative description in terms of differential equations, taking advantage of the knowledge gained regarding qualitative behaviour. Two articles by Thomas and Marcelline Kaufman compare the logical and differential predictions of the number and nature of the steady states. Following articles by Thomas and Marcelle Kaufman, and by Thomas and Pascal Nardone showed that the phase space of the system can be partitioned into domains according to the signs and to the real or complex nature of the eigenvalues of the Jacobian matrix.

Indeed, regulatory circuits can be defined formally as sets of non-empty elements of the Jacobian matrix (or of the interaction graph) of dynamical systems such that the line and column indices are in circular permutation. The sign of a circuit is then given by the product of the signs of the corresponding Jacobian elements. Noteworthy, the nature of steady states depends entirely on the terms of the Jacobian matrix that belong to a circuit as only those terms appear in the characteristic equation of a system and thus take part in the calculation of its eigenvalues.

Thomas further suggested that both a positive circuit and a negative circuit are needed to generate deterministic chaos. With this in mind, a number of surprisingly simple sets of first order differential equations were constructed and shown to display deterministic chaos. The most spectacular one was probably the complex symmetric attractors ("Labyrinth chaos") generated by a set of n (n>=3) first order differential equations. This system was further analysed in depth by Sprott and coworkers.

=== Thomas' school ===
From the very beginning of his career, Thomas recruited and mentored many talented students, with chemistry or biology degree. Most were women, such that a colleague from the US used to call his lab "the belle laboratoire". While he was inflexible about scientific rigor, he readily provided his students with a vast freedom of thoughts, experimental design and publication. Many of them, including Martine Thilly, Suzanne Mousset, Albert Herzog, Alex Bollen, Christine Dambly, Josiane Szpirer, Ariane Toussaint, Jean-Pierre Lecocq, Jean Richelle and Denis Thieffry went on pursuing scientific careers in Belgium and France, in the field of molecular genetics on a large set of organisms, from phages to bacteria, fungi, drosophila, zebra fish and humans.

As Thomas shifted his research interest from biochemistry to phage genetics, then to mathematical biology and finally to dynamical systems, he addressed complex theoretical questions with an experimental mind frame, moving from wet experiments to computational simulations. His contributions to these different fields had and still have an important influence worldwide, in particular in the context of the recent emergence of systems biology.

A series of testimonies and tribute articles can be found in a special issue of the Journal of Theoretical Biology dedicated to the memory of René Thomas and published in 2019.
