= Nihoul =

Nihoul is a surname. Notable people with the surname include:

- Jacques Nihoul (1937–2021), Belgian scientist and professor
- Michel Nihoul (1941–2019), Belgian felon and alleged pedophile
