= Belgian Society of Biochemistry and Molecular Biology =

The Belgian Society of Biochemistry and Molecular Biology (BMB) is a Belgian non-profit organization, concerned with biochemistry and molecular biology.

The BMB was created, based on an initiative of Marcel Florkin, so a Belgian society could join the new International Union of Biochemistry. The first charter of the society was drafted by Edouard J. Bigwood, Jean Brachet, Christian de Duve, Marcel Florkin, Lucien Massart, Paul Putzeys, Laurent Vandendriessche and Claude Lièbecq. The first general assembly was held on 12 January 1952, and the first President of the society was Marcel Florkin, with Claude Lièbecq as secretary and treasurer.

== See also ==
- National Fund for Scientific Research
