= Van Tiggelen =

Van Tiggelen is a Dutch surname. Notable people with the surname include:

- Ad van Tiggelen (born 1958), Dutch fantasy novelist
- Adolphe Van Tiggelen (1914–1969), Belgian combustion scientist and professor
- Adri van Tiggelen (born 1957), Dutch footballer
- Brigitte Van Tiggelen (born 1962), Belgian historian of chemistry
