= Lucien Massart =

Lucien Massart (1908–1988) was a specialist in the animal and plant enzymology. He was a professor and in 1957 was awarded the Francqui Prize on Biological and Medical Sciences.

In 1951, together with Edouard J. Bigwood, Jean Brachet, Christian de Duve, Marcel Florkin, Paul Putzeys, Laurent Vandendriessche and Claude Lièbecq, he was one of the founders of the Belgian Society of Biochemistry and Molecular Biology.
