= Sudhir Ranjan Jain =

Indian theoretical physicist

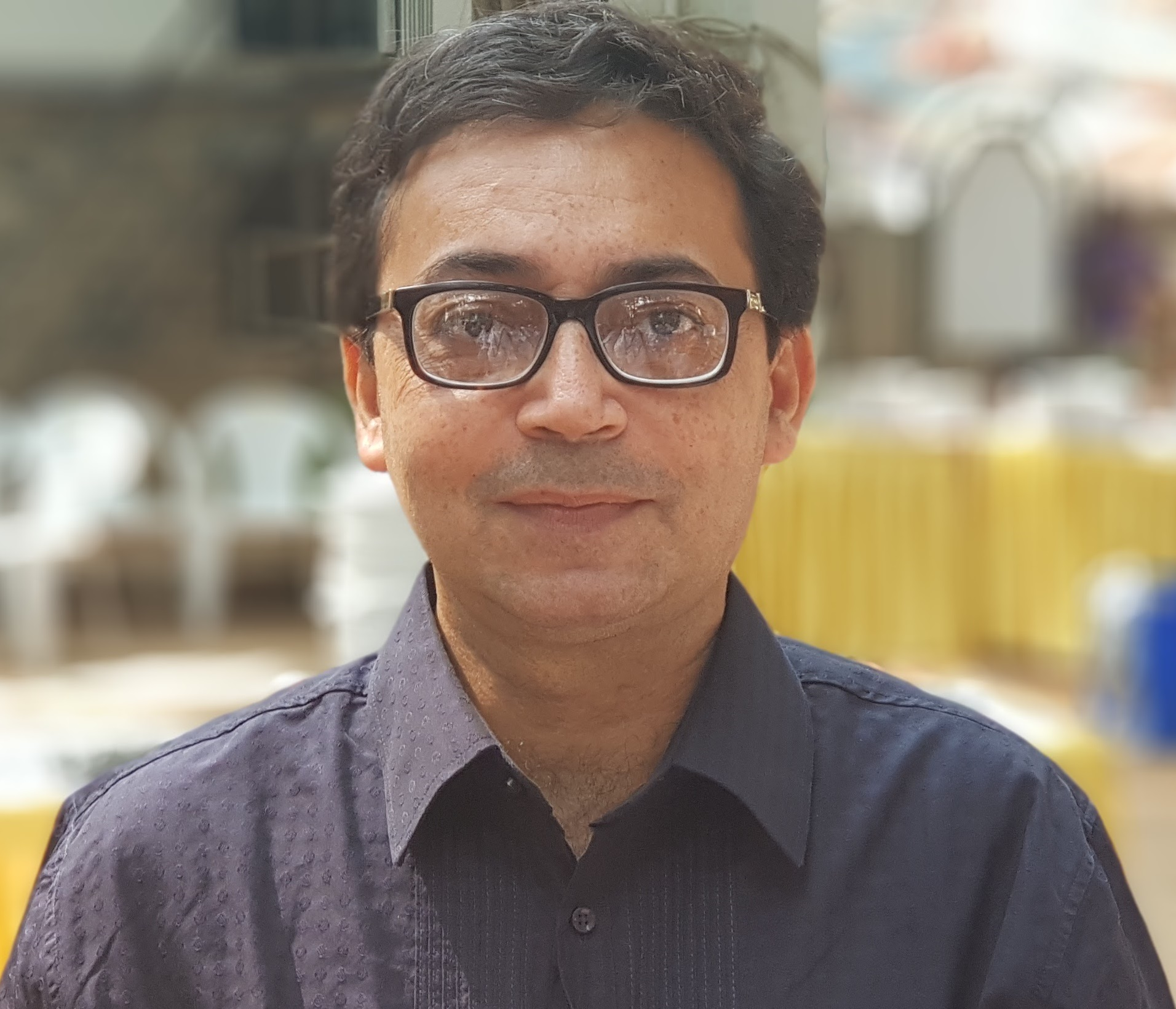
- Jain in 2017
- Education: University of Delhi (B.Sc.); Indian Institute of Technology, Delhi (M.Sc.); University of Mumbai (Ph.D.)
- Scientific career
- Fields: Nonlinear Dynamics, Nuclear Physics, Semiclassical physics, Dynamical billiards, Random Matrix Theory, Quantum chaos
- Workplaces: Bhabha Atomic Research Centre; Homi Bhabha National Institute; Centre for Excellence in Basic Sciences
- Doctoral advisor: Suresh V. Lawande

Sudhir Ranjan Jain (born 16 May 1963) is an Indian theoretical physicist at the Bhabha Atomic Research Centre, Mumbai, known for his contributions in complex quantum systems and Nonlinear dynamics. He worked as a scientist at the Nuclear Physics Division of Bhabha Atomic Research Centre, a professor at Homi Bhabha National Institute and an adjunct professor and member of the Academic Board at the Centre for Excellence in Basic Sciences. He is currently the Professor of Eminence at Somaiya Vidyavihar University. He has authored Mechanics, Waves and Thermodynamics: An Example-based Approach and A Primer on Fluid Mechanics with Applications. His doctoral advisor was Prof. Suresh V. Lawande, who was a student of Edward Teller.

== Biography ==
Sudhir Ranjan Jain was born in Mainpuri (Uttar Pradesh, India). He completed his bachelor's degree from Hindu College, Delhi, in 1983 and master's degree from Indian Institute of Technology, Delhi, in 1985. He joined Bhabha Atomic Research Centre in 1986. Subsequently, he obtained his Ph.D. degree from University of Mumbai in 1994 under the guidance of Dr. Suresh V. Lawande. He did post-doctoral research at Centre for Nonlinear Phenomena and Complex Systems, Université libre de Bruxelles, Belgium, with Pierre Gaspard, where he worked on semiclassics of many-body Fermionic systems.

He has been a visiting professor at Feza Gürsey Institute, Istanbul, Turkey (2008), Institut Henri Poincaré, Paris, France (2007), Institute of Theoretical Physics, Utrecht University, Netherlands (2006) and Institute for Physical Science and Technology, University of Maryland, College Park (2005).

== Research ==
Jain's areas of specialization are theoretical nuclear physics, semiclassical physics, and nonlinear dynamics.

He is known for his work on many-body systems, especially for Jain-Khare models which gave exact quantum solutions with connections to random matrix theory, leading to exact eigenfunctions for a class of chaotic systems. The bosonised version of the Jain-Khare model exhibits Bose Einstein condensation.

His notable works include his work on Pseudo Hermitian Random Matrix theory, relation of Random Matrix theory to anyon gases, theorems and statistics for integrable billiards and nodal domains, quantum modes built on chaotic motion, Poincaré recurrence theorem in Kac's ring. His work in neutrino physics pioneered in calculation of geometric phases in neutrinos.

Among other contributions, Jain made significant developments towards the exact semiclassical treatment of deuteron which he further extended to nuclear three body problem of triton. He developed an exact semiclassical trace formula to calculate level densities of spherical nuclei with no adjustable parameters.

He has also worked on quantum computation and quantum information science. In particular, his work with his collaborators has led to an understanding of controlling quantum jump by realising "Dehmelt-like" shelving by employing quantum Zeno effect. His work has contributed a non-topological code with highest encoding rate and established protection of qubits using ideas from classical and quantum nonlinear science

He was scientific secretary of the XXth Solvay Conference on Femtochemistry. He was also the convenor of International conference on complex quantum systems in 2017, 2020 and 2023.

== Awards ==
- INSA medal for young scientists (1994)
- Anil Kumar Bose Memorial Award, 1999 (1999) for his work relating to geometric phases and response functions.
