= Jean-Édouard Desmedt =

Jean-Édouard Desmedt (19 February 1926 in Wavre – 23 November 2009) was a Belgian scientist and professor at the Universite Libre de Bruxelles (ULB), who was awarded the Francqui Prize on Biological and Medical Sciences for his work on neurophysiology. He is a member of the Académie nationale de Médecine in France, and the Natural Science Section of the Royal Academy of Science, Humanities and Fine Arts of Belgium.
