= Zénon Bacq =

Belgian radiobiologist and inventor

Zénon Marcel Bacq (31 December 1903 in La Louvière – 12 July 1983 in Fontenoy) was a Belgian radiobiologist and inventor. He studied medicine at the Université libre de Bruxelles (ULB), and became an MD in 1927. He studied at Harvard University (1929–1930), with a grant from the FNRS. He taught animal physiology, pathology, as well as pharmacology and radiobiology at the University of Liège (ULg).

Bacq worked on nerve transmission and had examined adrenergic and cholinergic transmission. During the war years he worked in Walter B. Cannon's laboratory at Harvard examining gas interaction with sulphur compounds. While studying the chemical transmissions of nerve impulses, he invented processes to guard himself against ionizing radiations. In 1948 he was awarded the Francqui Prize on Biological and Medical Sciences.

Bacq was a gifted musician who played the piano, composing songs and arranging stage music for Shakespeare's Tempest when it was performed in Liege. He also took an interest in literature and painting.

== Honours ==
- 3.7.1971: Member of the Royal Academy of Science, Letters and Fine Arts of Belgium.
