= Léon H. Dupriez =

Léon Hugo Dupriez (19 October 1901 – 13 October 1986) was a Belgian academic and economist.

He was born in Leuven and studied at Harvard University (1918–1919), and the Catholic University of Leuven (1919–1924). From 1925 to 1928 he worked at the National Bank of Belgium. He became a professor at the University of Leuven in 1930, until his retirement in 1972. His courses were on statistics, economics, and economic epistemology. He was awarded the Francqui Prize in 1948.
