= André Trouet =

Belgian scientist

André Trouet is a Belgian scientist, and professor emeritus of the University of Louvain (UCLouvain) in Louvain-la-Neuve. He was a student of Christian de Duve, who received the 1974 Nobel Prize in Medicine for his research on the structural and functional organization of the cell. André Trouet is a member of the Scientific and Medical Advisory Board (SMAB) of the biotech company DIATOS. In 1981, he was awarded the Francqui Prize on Biological and Medical Sciences for his work on cellular and molecular pathology.
