= Jacques Urbain =

Belgian scientist and professor

Jacques Urbain is a Belgian scientist, and professor at the Université libre de Bruxelles. In 1987, he was awarded the Francqui Prize on Biological and Medical Sciences for his work on immunology.
