= Claire Préaux =

Belgian papyrologist and historian

Claire Préaux (1904–1979) was a Belgian papyrologist and historian.

She was born in Liège and studied at the Université libre de Bruxelles, from which she graduated in 1927. In 1944 she was appointed Professor at the same university. In 1933, she was engaged by the Brooklyn Museum to publish the Greek ostraca of the Wilbour Collection. In 1953 she was awarded the Francqui Prize on Human Sciences for "Philologie classique". In 1956 she was nominated corresponding fellow of the British Academy.
