= KU Leuven Kulak =

Coordinates: 50°48′22″N 3°17′38″E

- Katholieke Universiteit Leuven Kulak
- Type: Independent/Partly state funded
- Established: 1964
- Affiliations: Coimbra Group; LERU
- Rector: Piet Desmet (campus rector)
- Administrative staff: 150
- Students: 1479 (2016)
- Location: Kortrijk, Belgium
- Website: www.kuleuven-kulak.be

KU Leuven Kulak (Dutch: Katholieke Universiteit Leuven Kulak, or Kulak) is a university satellite campus of the KU Leuven in Kortrijk (Courtrai) in the Belgian province of West Flanders. It is officially a Dutch-speaking institution.

All Kulak campus faculty buildings, research facilities, student dormitories, restaurant and social areas are within a single university park, located on a shallow hill in the "t'Hoge" (the heights) region just south of the city centre of Kortrijk. About half of the students live either in the university dormitory or in a rented room nearby. The other half lives with their family in the greater Kortrijk region, close enough to commute (even by bike) to the university.

== History ==
=== Beginning ===
The first academic year started at the KULAK in 1965. Initially, the courses took place in het 'Vormingsinstituut' for SME's, located at the Hoog-Kortrijk area. The first student administration centre was situated in the King Albert Street, in the city centre of Kortrijk. Later, the 'Guesthouse', known as a meeting and lodgingplace for foreign researchers and guest professors, was opened.

=== Courses ===
From the founding of the university campus till now, the diversity of programmes offered has been steadily increasing. In 1965, the Kulak started with "Arts and Philosophy" ('Letteren en Wijsbegeerte') (including Law). Six years later, in 1971, the "Medical faculty" and the "Science Faculty" (including Mathematics, Physics and Chemistry) were founded. From 1984 onwards, students could enroll in the "Informatics" (ITC) programme, from 1985 in the "Pharmacy" courses and from 1986 in the "Biology" and "Bio-Engineering" courses. In the academic year 1991-1992, the "Economics" department started ('Toegepaste Economische Wetenschappen'), and from 2004 onwards the "Education Studies" programme is offered.

=== Building Phases ===
In 1970, the StuHu was built: a student home containing a restaurant, a meeting room and several living units. In 1971, the 'Groene Mote' (or the 'dorm') was finished. That same year, the faculty or Arts and Philosophy was opened (currently Building A). Building E, housing the Medical faculty and the Interdisciplinary Research Centrum (IRC) was inaugurated in 1973 and 1975.

In 1982, a new expansion phase started which comprised the building of a 'student village', of a new Library and of the Faculty of Science and administration buildings.

In the early 1990s, the new Building B, designed by architect Stéphane Beel, was opened.

In 2007 a new enlargement phase started. This phase consisted in the construction of a new student residence, named 'Corona', to house 81 students and a new building, Building C. Also, the long corridor between Buildings A and B, the so-called "Spina", was extended until the Building E. Soon followed by an expansion of the Interdisciplinary Research Facility - Life Sciences.

In 2017 the student residence 'Groene Mote' was closed down and replaced by a new one named 'Spoelberg' offering accommodation for 103 students.

In the same period the buildings on campus, previously hosting the Innovation and Incubation Centre Kortrijk (IICK) were acquired by KU Leuven, and now are an integral part of the campus.

=== Campus rectors ===
Throughout the years, the Kortrijk University has known several campus rectors:

1971 - 1991: Mgr Guido Maertens
1991 - 1992: Frans Van Cauwelaert
1992 - 1996: Vic Nachtergaele
1996 - 2001: Marcel Joniau
2001 - 2009: Piet Vanden Abeele
2009 - 2013: Jan Beirlant
2013 - 2017: Marc Depaepe
2017 - now: Piet Desmet

== Faculties ==
- Faculty of Arts
  - History
  - Linguistics and literature
- Faculty of Business and Economics
  - Applied economics
- Faculty of Law
  - Law
- Faculty of Medicine
  - Medicine
  - Biomedical sciences
- Faculty of Psychology and Educational Sciences
  - Education studies
- Science, Engineering and Technology Group
  - Mathematics
  - Informatics
  - Physics
  - Chemistry
  - Biology

== Buildings ==
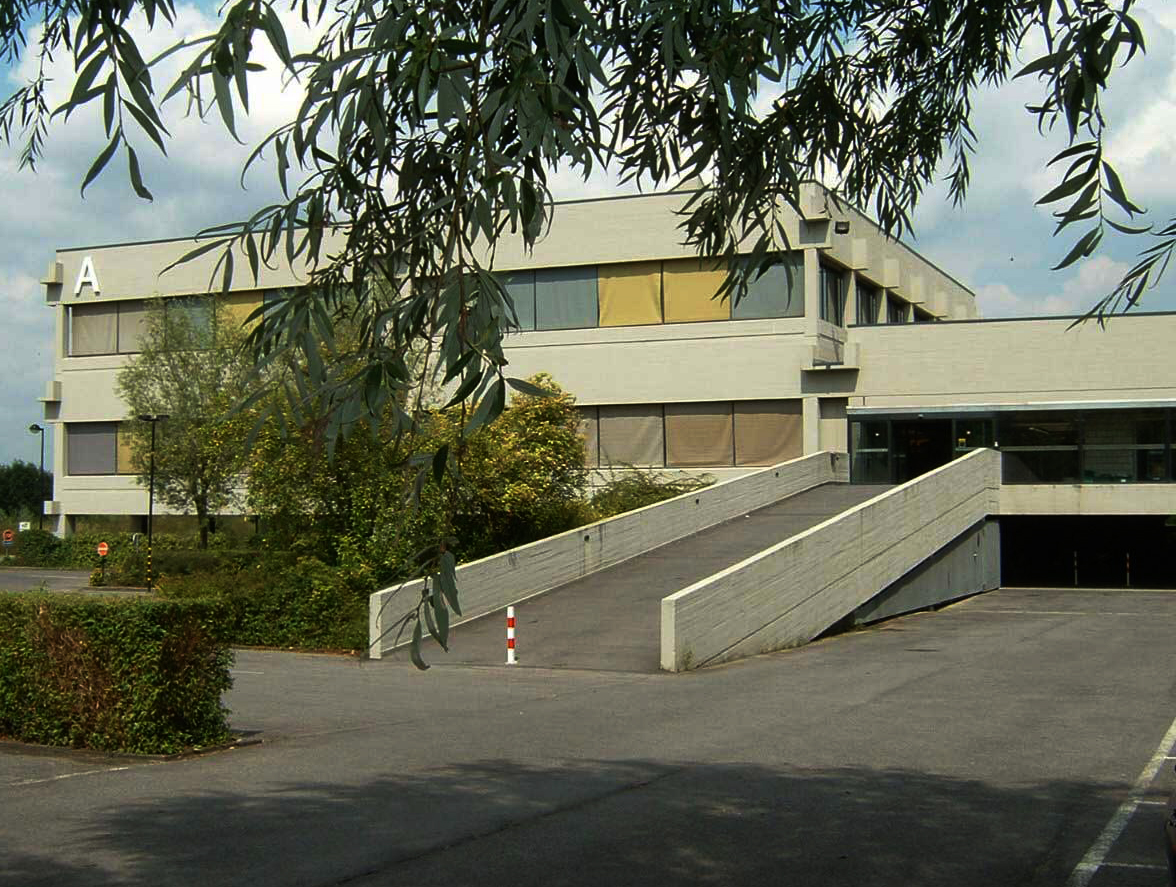
Entrance Building A

The Kortrijk University Campus is located in the 'Etienne Sabbelaan' in the Hoog-Kortrijk area. The campus consists of several buildings, which are all connected by a 120-meter long corridor: the 'Spina'.

- Building A
  - Welcome Desk
  - Student Administration
  - Central hal
  - Faculty of Arts
  - Faculty of Law
  - Faculty of Psychology and Educational Sciences
  - Faculty of Science
  - Campus Library
  - Rectorat

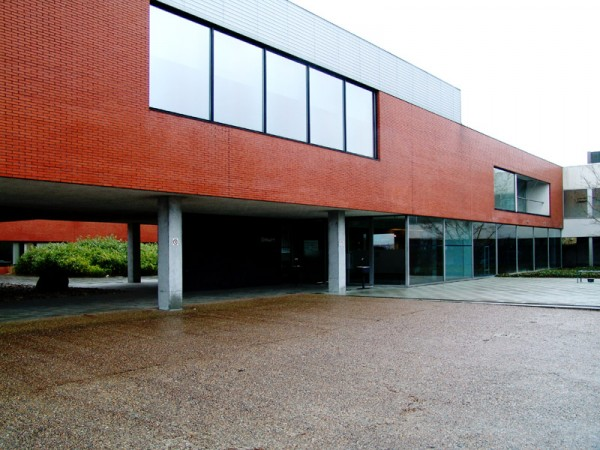
Building B

- Building B
  - Faculty Business and Economics
  - Postacademic Education (PAV)
- Building C
  - Faculty Educational Science (Onderwijskunde)
- Building E
  - Faculty of Medicine & Biomedical Sciences
  - Interdisciplinary Research Facility - Life Sciences
- Incubation and Innovation Centre Kortrijk (IICK)
- Students centre
  - Student House with restaurant, bar and social event area
  - Faculty Club restaurant

== Student Dormitories ==
- De Groene Mote (closed)
- Students Village
- Corona
- Spoelberg

== Trivia ==
The Kortrijk University houses the "Library of the French Netherlands" (French: Pays-Bas français; Dutch: Franse Nederlanden), containing a collection regarding the literature and history of the French Netherlands, and an "Archive French Netherlands" containing documents about the regionalist movements in Northern France.
