= José J. Fripiat =

Belgian scientist (1923–2014)

José J. Fripiat (1 July 1923 – 17 February 2014) was a Belgian scientist and former professor at the Universite Catholique de Louvain. He obtained an M.S. degree in Chemistry and Physics in 1944 at the Universite Catholique de Louvain. He started his career as a "soil physicist" in a research institute located in the Belgian Congo. While working in Congo he calculated and measured the motion of the water levels in soils of Central Africa and was able to predict it. In 1951, he received the Barman Award of the Belgium Royal Academy. In 1967, he was awarded the Francqui Prize on Exact Sciences for his work on surface chemistry. In 1986, he went to the United States to work at the Laboratory for Surface Studies at the University of Wisconsin–Milwaukee.
