= Jacques Errera =

Belgian physicochemist and advocate for peaceful atomic energy

From the 1933 Solvay photo below

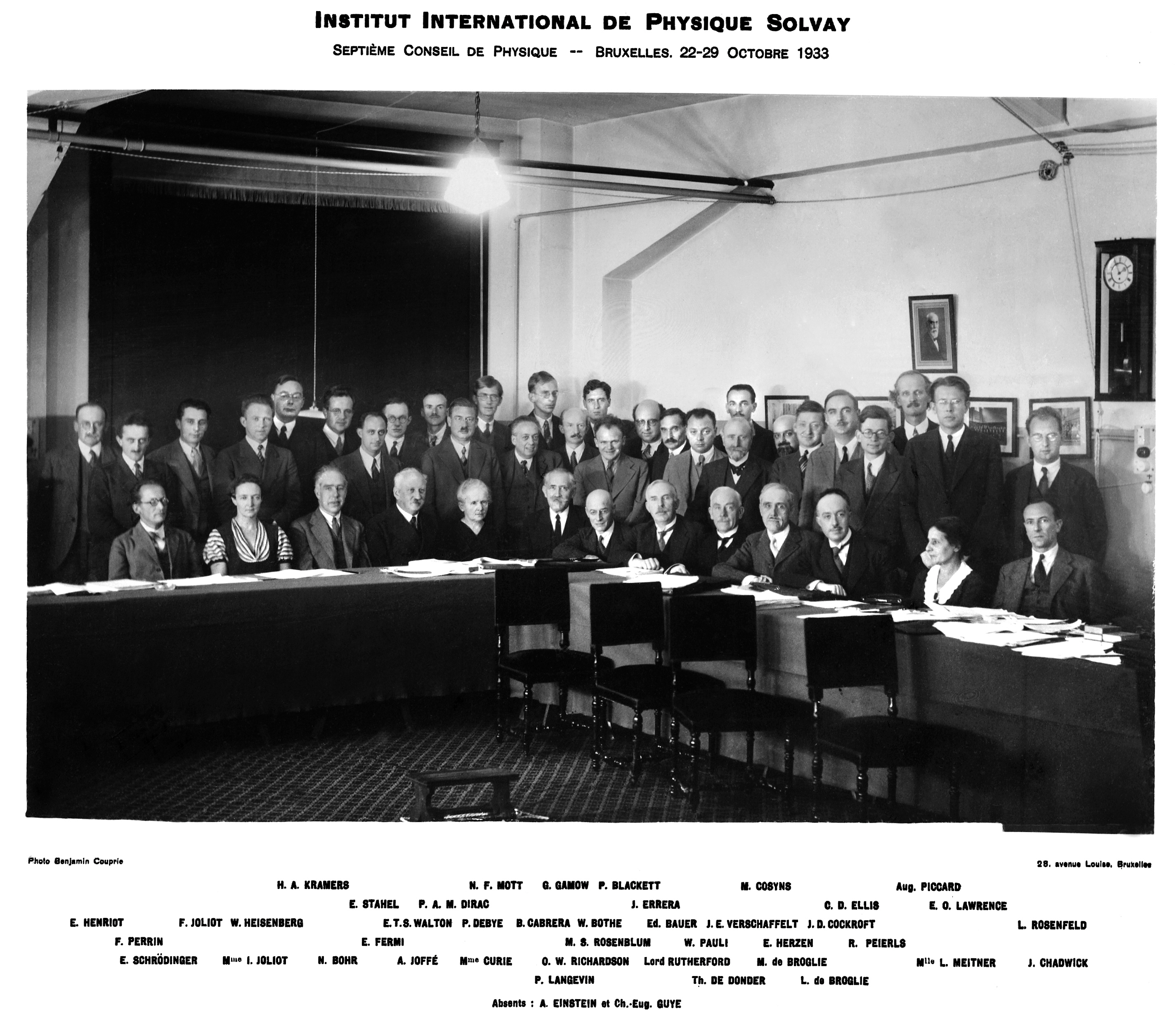
Seventh Solvay Conference, 1933

Jacques Errera (25 September 1896 – 30 March 1977) was a Belgian physicochemist, specialized in the molecular constitution of matter. During the 1930s he worked at the Free University of Brussels, and participated in the Solvay Conference of 1933. In 1938 he was awarded the Francqui Prize in Exact Sciences. Shortly after the first atomic bombs were used in 1945, he authored an optimistic article about the peaceful future potential of atomic energy. After WW2, Errera represented Belgium at both the United Nations Atomic Energy Commission and the International Atomic Energy Agency. He was the son of Isabelle Errera.
