= Paul Harsin =

Belgian historian

Paul Marie Isidore Harsin (1902–1983) was an economic and political historian who held doctorates in the humanities, social sciences, and law. He was a professor at the University of Liège for over 40 years and briefly served as president of the Royal Academy of Science, Letters and Fine Arts of Belgium.

== Life ==
Harsin was born in Liège on 21 January 1902. In 1928 he succeeded his teacher, Karl Hanquet, as professor of history, teaching until 1970. In 1950, he was awarded the Francqui Prize in Human Sciences. He was elected a corresponding member of the Belgian Royal Academy on 7 May 1951, a full member on 5 December 1955, and served as president in 1967. He died in Liège on 11 July 1983.

== Publications ==
- Les relations extérieures de la principauté de Liège sous Jean Louis d'Elderen et Joseph Clément de Bavière, 1688–1718 (Liège and Paris, 1927)
- Crédit public et Banque d'Etat en France du XVIe au XVIIIe siècle (Paris, 1933)
- La Révolution liégeoise de 1789 (Brussels, 1953)
