= Alexis Jacquemin =

Belgian economist (1938–2004)

- Born: 24 July 1938
- Died: 14 August 2004 (aged 66)

Academic background
- Education: Université de Liège

Academic work
- Institutions: UCLouvain
- Awards: Francqui Prize on Human Sciences (1983)

Alexis Jacquemin (24 July 1938 – 14 August 2004) was a Belgian economist. He received his PhD at the Université catholique de Louvain in 1967 and eventually became a professor at the same university in 1974. In 1983, he was awarded the Francqui Prize on Human Sciences.

== Major publications ==
- L'entreprise et son pouvoir de marché, 1967, (Spanish transl. La Empresa y su Dominio del Mercado, 1969).
- La double imposition économique des bénéfices des sociétés et les mesures d'allègement, Louvain, 1968.
- Le droit économique, 1970.
- Fondements d'économie politique, 1970, new ed., 1986.
- La magistrature économique - De economische magistratuur, ed. with G. Schrans, 1976.
- Aspects juridiques de l'intervention des pouvoirs publics dans la vie économique, 1976.
- Market Structure, Corporate Behaviour and the State (ed.), 1976.
- Welfare Aspects of Industrial Markets (ed.), 1977.
- Public Enterprise in the EEC, Part I : Belgium, Luxemburg, 1978.
- Economie industrielle européenne, 1975, 2nd ed. 1979; Spanish transl.1982, Portuguese 1984).
- European Industrial Organization, 1977, (It. transl.1979, Hungarian, 1981).
- Les magistratures économiques et la crise, 1984.
- European Industry : Public Policy and Corporate Strategy (ed.), 1984.
- Sélection et Pouvoir dans la Nouvelle Economie Industrielle, 1985
- The New Industrial Organization, 1987, (transl. in Dutch, German, Italian, Spanish and Japanese).
- L'enjeu européen de 1992 (Cecchini-report), (contr.), 1988.
- The Economics of 1992, (contr.), 1988.
- The European internal market, trade and competition (ed.), 1989.
- Barriers to entry and strategic competition, (co-authored), 1990.
- Competition Policy in Europe and North America : economic issues and institutions, (co-authored), 1990.
- Mergers and Competition Policy in the EC, De Vries Lectures in Economics, 1991
- Fondements d'économie politique, with Henry Tulkens and Paul Mercier, 3d ed., 2001
