= Pol Swings =

Belgian astrophysicist

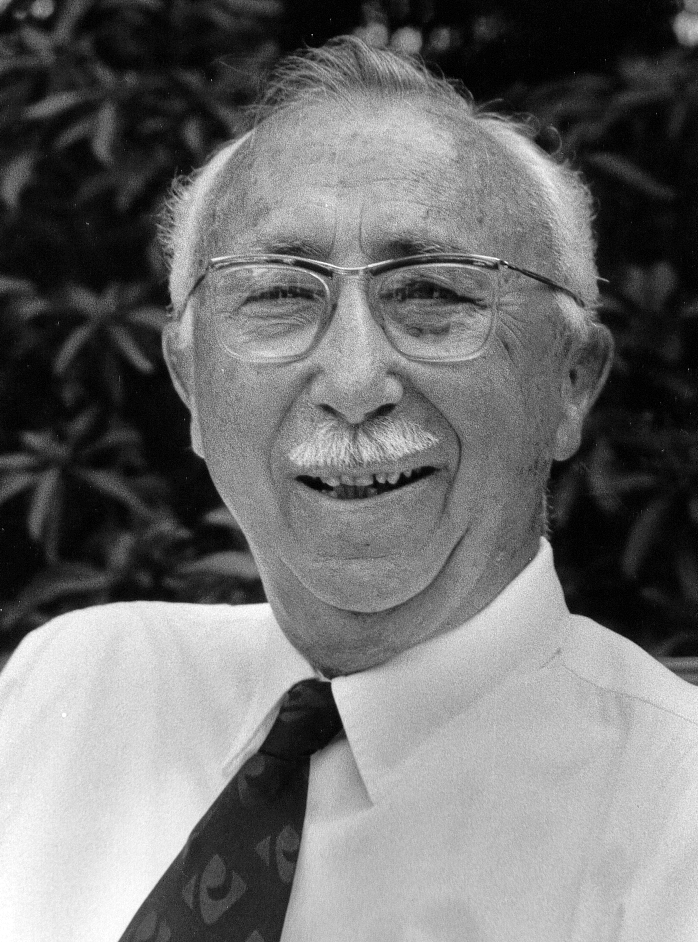
- Born: Polydore F. Swings; 24 September 1906; Ransart, Belgium
- Died: 28 October 1983 (aged 77); Esneux, Belgium
- Education: University of Liège
- Known for: spectroscopy
- Awards: Francqui Prize for Exact Sciences (1948); Prix Jules Janssen(1958); Janssen Medal (1961)
- Scientific career
- Fields: astrophysicist
- Workplaces: University of Chicago

Polydore Félix Ferdinand Swings (24 September 1906 – 28 October 1983) was a Belgian astrophysicist who was known for his studies of the composition and structure of stars and comets. He used spectroscopy to identify the elements in astronomical bodies, and, in particular, comets. Swings studied at the University of Liège, where he was professor of spectroscopy and astrophysics from 1932 to 1975. He was also a visiting professor at the University of Chicago in the United States (1939–43, 1946–52).

From his study of cometary atmospheres, he is credited with the discovery of the Swings bands and the Swings effect. Swings bands are emission lines resulting from the presence of certain atoms of carbon; the Swings effect was discovered with the aid of a slit spectrograph and is attributed to fluorescence resulting partly from solar radiation.

Moreover, Swings studied spectroscopy of interstellar space and investigated the rotation of stars, as well as nebulae, novae, and variable stars. Pol Swings was awarded the Francqui Prize for Exact Sciences in 1948. He was awarded the Prix Jules Janssen by the Société astronomique de France in 1958. He was elected to the American Academy of Arts and Sciences in 1965, and the American Philosophical Society and the United States National Academy of Sciences in 1966.

In 1981, Swings became a founding member of the World Cultural Council.

1637 Swings, an asteroid of the Main belt is named after him.
