= Isidoor Leusen =

Isidoor Leusen (17 December 1923 – 17 January 2010) was a Belgian physiologist was awarded the Francqui Prize on Biological and Medical Sciences in 1969.
