= 1637 Swings =

Main-belt asteroid

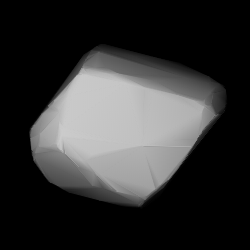
- Shape model of Swings from its lightcurve

Discovery
- Discovered by: J. Hunaerts
- Discovery site: Uccle Obs.
- Discovery date: 28 August 1936

Designations
- Named after: Pol Swings (astrophysicist)
- Alternative designations: 1936 QO · 1907 YT; 1934 FL · 1934 FP; 1936 SD · 1939 FU; 1950 GA
- Minor planet category: main-belt · (outer)

Orbital characteristics
- Epoch 4 September 2017 (JD 2458000.5)
- Uncertainty parameter 0
- Observation arc: 109.78 yr (40,096 days)
- Aphelion: 3.2088 AU
- Perihelion: 2.9356 AU
- Semi-major axis: 3.0722 AU
- Eccentricity: 0.0445
- Orbital period (sidereal): 5.38 yr (1,967 days)
- Mean anomaly: 123.47°
- Mean motion: 0° 10^{m} 58.8^{s} / day
- Inclination: 14.068°
- Longitude of ascending node: 21.288°
- Argument of perihelion: 236.17°

Physical characteristics
- Dimensions: 45.15 km (IRAS); 52.994±0.428 km
- Geometric albedo: 0.042±0.004
- Absolute magnitude (H): 10.4

1637 Swings, provisional designation 1936 QO, is a dark asteroid from the outer region of the asteroid belt, approximately 50 kilometers in diameter. Discovered by Joseph Hunaerts in 1936, it was named after Belgian astronomer Pol Swings.

== Discovery ==
Swings was discovered on 28 August 1936, by Belgian astronomer Joseph Hunaerts at the Royal Observatory of Belgium in Uccle, Belgium. In the following month, it was independently discovered by astronomer Cyril Jackson at Johannesburg Observatory in South Africa.

== Orbit and classification ==
The asteroid orbits the Sun in the outer main-belt at a distance of 2.9–3.2 AU once every 5 years and 5 months (1,967 days). Its orbit has an eccentricity of 0.04 and an inclination of 14° with respect to the ecliptic. In 1907, Swings was first identified as 1907 YT at Heidelberg Observatory. However, the body's observation arc begins with its official discovery observation at Uccle in 1936.

== Physical characteristics ==
According to the surveys carried out by the Infrared Astronomical Satellite IRAS and NASA's Wide-field Infrared Survey Explorer with its subsequent NEOWISE mission, Swings' surface has an albedo of 0.042, and measures 45.15 and 52.99 kilometers in diameter, respectively. It has an absolute magnitude of 10.4.

As of 2017, the body's spectral type, rotation period and shape remain unknown.

== Naming ==
This minor planet was named after Pol Swings (1906–1983), a Belgian astrophysicist, astronomer and president of the International Astronomical Union during 1964–1967, who significantly contributed to the understanding of the physics of comets and their spectra. The official naming citation was published by the Minor Planet Center on 20 February 1976 (M.P.C. 3932).
