= Jules Duchesne =

Belgian scientist (1911–1984)

Jules Charles Gérard Léon Duchesne (1911–1984) was a Belgian scientist. He was awarded the Francqui Prize on Exact Sciences and the Gold Medal of the Francqui Foundation in 1961, for his work on molecular physics.

== Work ==
At the laboratory of atomic and molecular physics, Duchesne studied the dynamic behaviour of molecules and identified the role of molecular vibrations in chemical reactivity. In 1950 this gave rise to the theory of infra-red photoactivation.

Duchesne studied the properties of the solid state. He was the first to establish the law governing the broadening of quadripolar nuclear resonance in crystals containing isomorphic impurities. In this way he discovered the effects of charge transfer, the fraction of the transfer and the location of the transferred electron.

From 1957 he concentrated on the properties of nitrogen and presented his findings to the academy as "La molécule de N2O4 et un nouveau type de liaison chimique" ("The N204 molecule and a new type of chemical bond")

In 1964, free radicals in various meteorites were identified at Liege. As a recognized expert in the field of carbonate rocks, Jules Duchesne was chosen by the NASA to study lunar samples collected by the Apollo 11 and Apollo 12 missions.

From 1975, while continuing to write on atomic physics and molecular biophysics, he also broadened his scope, to include medical matters.

== Personal ==
In 1948 he married Audrey Madeline Cripps (b 1919), who was English. This subsequently resulted in two recorded children.

== Sources ==
- Laureates of the Franqui Prize
- Obituary/Biography from Leuven/Louvain university
