= Éric Derouane =

Éric Gérard Joseph Derouane (4 July 1944 in Péruwelz – 17 March 2008 in Praia da Luz) was a French-speaking Belgian catalyst scientist.

In 1968 he obtained his MSc in Chemistry at Princeton University and his PhD at the University of Liège. He then became a Research Associate of the National Fund for Scientific Research (Belgium). In 1973, he was appointed as Professor at the Facultés universitaires Notre-Dame de la Paix in Namur, Belgium, where he has been the Director of the Laboratory of Catalysis. In 1995, he became Full Professor and Director of the Leverhulme Centre for Innovative Catalysis at the University of Liverpool. In 1994, he was awarded the Francqui Prize on Exact Sciences. In March 2008, he died at his home in Portugal.

== See also ==
- Catalysis
