= Diether Lambrechts =

Belgian researcher (born 1976)

- Born: 2 August 1976 (age 50); Hasselt
- Education: KU Leuven
- Scientific career
- Fields: Genetics; Bioinformatics; Oncology
- Workplaces: KU Leuven; VIB
- Doctoral advisor: Peter Carmeliet

Diether Lambrechts (born 1976) is a Belgian geneticist and professor at the KU Leuven and VIB. He is the director of the Vesalius Research Center. Lambrechts is known for his multidisciplinary approach to dissecting tumor biology. Major scientific contributions include identifying oxygen supply regulation as an anti-cancer treatment strategy.

In 2013, Lambrechts was awarded an ERC Consolidator award. In 2026 he received the Francqui Prize jointly with Patrice Cani.
