= Isabelle Errera =

Belgian art historian (1869–1929)

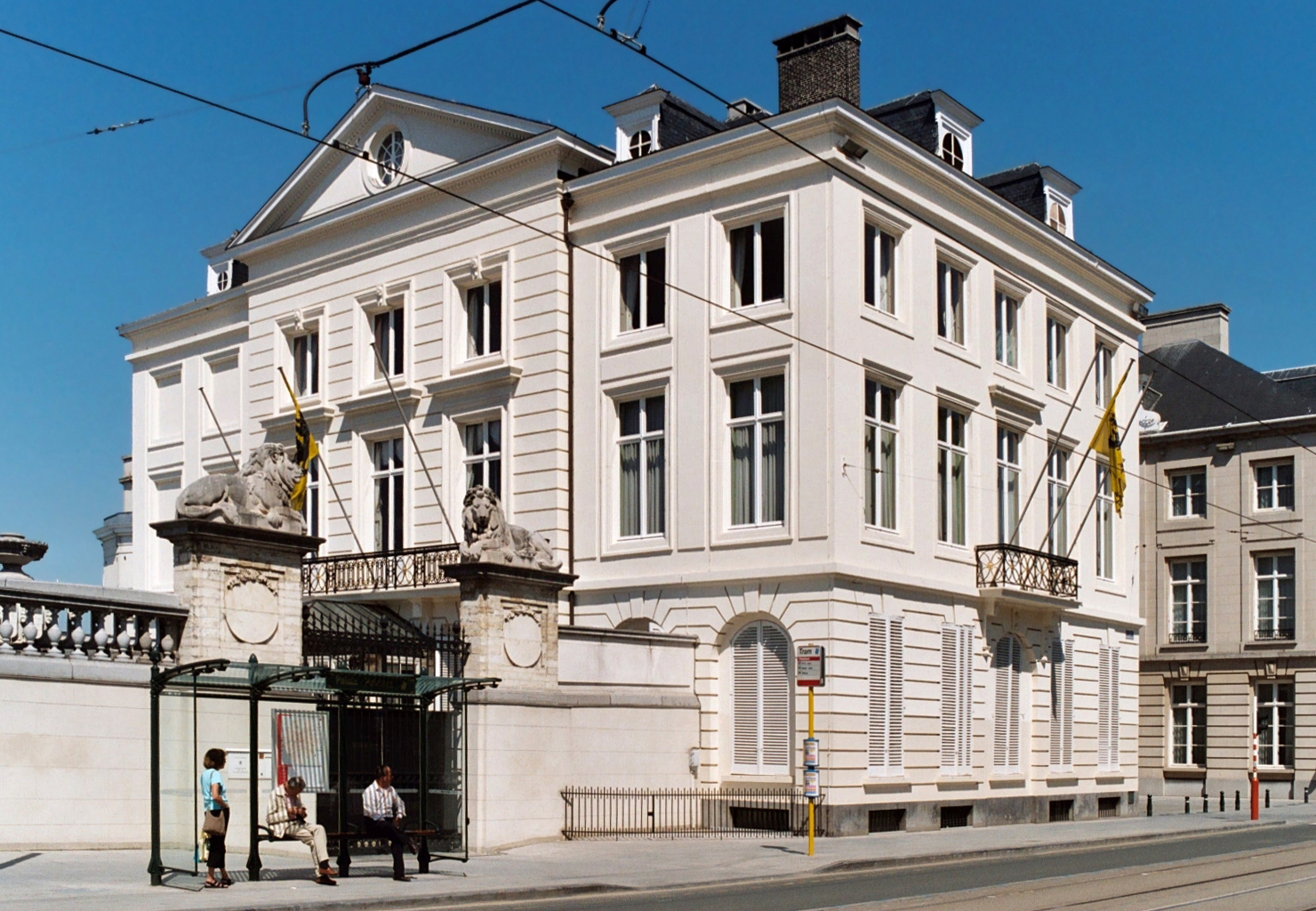
The Hôtel Errera in Brussels, home to Isabelle Errera from 1890 until her death, now the headquarters of the Minister-President of Flanders

Isabella or Isabelle Alice Errera (née Goldschmidt; 5 April 1869 - 23 June 1929) was a Belgian art historian specializing in textiles.

== Life ==
Isabelle Goldschmidt was born in Florence in 1869. Her parents were Isaac "John" Goldschmidt and Sophie Franchetti. Her uncle Giulio Franchetti was a textile collector, whose collection is partly kept at the Bargello in Florence and was the subject of an exhibition at the Palazzo Pretorio in Prato in 1981. Another uncle was politician and writer Baron Leopoldo Franchetti.

In 1870, her sister Élena Goldschmidt-Franchetti was born in Florence as well. She would become famous as the writer Jean Dornis.

Isabelle married the lawyer Paul-Joseph Errera (1860-1922), brother of botanist Léo Errera, in 1890 in Paris. They moved to the Hôtel Errera in the Rue Royale/Koningsstraat, Brussels, where Isabelle Errera worked from 1897 on as the conservator for the textiles department of the Royal Museums of Fine Arts of Belgium, and Paul Errera was a professor at the Université libre de Bruxelles, eventually becoming its rector, and from 1912 to 1921 mayor of Uccle. Isabelle and Paul became patrons of the arts, supporting the artists of Les XX and La Libre Esthétique, and Isabelle's portrait was painted by Fernand Khnopff.

In 1891, Isabelle became a member of the Société des mères israélites (Society of Israelite Mothers), a charity for poorer Jewish families and Jewish orphans. During the first world war, she was active in the resistance against the German occupation, and after the war she received exiled antifascist Italians in her home.

Isabelle Errera is chiefly remembered as a collector and art historian of textiles, specializing in Egyptian textiles but with a broad collection spanning many centuries and regions, and including avant-garde textile. Her two catalogues are still considered irreplaceable reference works. The room displaying her collection in the Brussels Museum still bears her name and is adorned with a bust of her sculpted by Thomas Vinçotte. 764 Pieces from her collection were donated to the museum, while her library was legated to the art school of La Cambre after her death in Brussels in 1929.

The chemist and professor Jacques Errera was the second of her children. Her daughter, Gabrielle, married the German Industrialist \ Philosopher of Science Paul Oppenheim

== Works ==
- 1901: Collection d'anciennes étoffes: réunies et décrites
- 1902: Hôtel Gruuthuuse, Bruges. Juin-septembre 1902. Exposition des primitifs flamands et d'art ancien. Section des tissus et broderies. Catalogue.

Published 1905

- 1905: Collection de broderies anciennes décrites par madame Isabelle Errera, catalogue of the textile department of the Royal Museums of Fine Arts of Belgium (reprinted 1907)
- 1916: Collection d'Anciennes Etoffes égyptiennes décrites par Isabelle Errera. Catalogue orné de 454 photogravures
- 1920: Répertoire Des Peintures Datées
