= Pierre Nolf =

Belgian scientist and politician

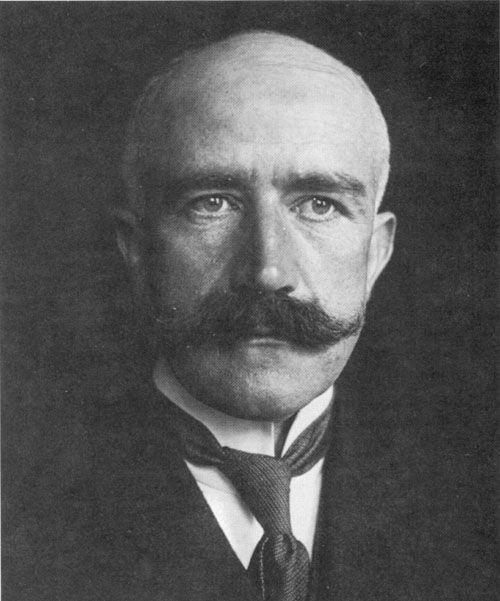
Perre Nolf

Pierre Nolf (Ypres, 26 July 1873 – Brussels, 14 September 1953) was a Belgian scientist and politician.

In 1940, he was nominated for the Nobel Prize for Physiology or Medicine, but the prize was not granted that year. In 1940 he received the Francqui Prize for Biological and Medical Sciences.
