= Georges Thines =

Georges Thines (10 February 1923 – 25 October 2016) was a Belgian scientist. He was awarded the Francqui Prize on Human Sciences in 1971 for his work on experimental psychology at the Laboratory of Experimental Psychology of the Universite Catholique de Louvain.
