= Pierre Macq =

Pierre Macq (8 July 1930 in Ganshoren – 17 September 2013) was a Belgian physicist who was the rector of the University of Louvain (UCLouvain) from 1986 until 1995. In 1973, he was awarded the Francqui Prize on Exact Sciences for his work on experimental nuclear physics.

In 1991, the Hoover Chair was founded by Pierre Macq, at the Faculty of Economic, Social and Political sciences of the UCLouvain, thanks to a donation from the BAEF for university development.
