= Jacques Nihoul =

Belgian scientist (1937–2021)

Jacques Nihoul (6 June 1937 – 6 May 2021) was a Belgian scientist and professor emeritus of the Faculty of Science of the University of Liège. He was the director of the DEA Européen en Modélisation de l'Environnement marin. In 1978, he was awarded the Francqui Prize on Biological and Medical Sciences. He signed the Manifesto for Walloon culture in 1983.
