= Marcel Florkin =

Belgian biochemist

Marcel Florkin (Liège, 15 August 1900 – 3 May 1979) was a Belgian biochemist. Florkin was graduated in 1928 as a Doctor in Medicine and became in 1934 a professor of biochemistry at the University of Liège. He retired as professor emeritus in 1970.

In 1951, he was the initiator of the Belgian Society of Biochemistry and Molecular Biology. Together with Christian de Duve, and others, he wrote a proposal for the statutes which was adopted in 1952, on the first general meeting. In 1944, he published a book (translated to English in 1949) concerning biochemical evolution, in which he explained the relevance of evolution for understanding differences in metabolism and chemical makeup between different types of organisms. In later years he applied the principles of biosemiotics (indicator biology) on biochemistry. In 1946, Marcel Florkin was awarded the Francqui Prize on Biological and Medical Sciences. He was a member of the Association for the intellectual and artistic progress of Wallonia.

== Bibliography ==
- Florkin, M, Concepts of molecular biosemiotics and of molecular evolution, In: Comprehensive Biochemistry, 29A: 1–124, 1974.
- Florkin, M, A History of Biochemistry, American Elsevier Publishing Co., 1972, xviii + 343 pp.

== Sources ==
- Fruton, JS, Marcel Florkin, 1900–1979, historian of biochemistry, Hist Philos Life Sci. 1980;2(1):167-71
