= Pierre Pestieau =

Belgian economist

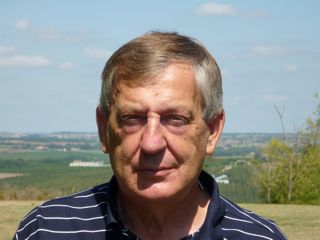

Pierre Pestieau (born 10 September 1943 in Froidchapelle) is a Belgian economist.

Pierre Pestieau received his master's degree in economics from the University of Louvain and his doctorate in economics from Yale University. From 1971 to 2006 he taught at Cornell University, then became professor of economics at the University of Liege, Belgium, from 1975 through 2008, when he became Professor Emeritus. He also a member of CORE and associate member of the Paris School of Economics as well as a fellow of IZA and CESIfo.

Pierre Pestieau's main fields of interest are public economics, population economics and social security. He has published several books and more than 250 articles in different international journals (Econometrica, Journal of Economic Theory, International Economic Review, Social Choice and Welfare). Currently he us associate editor of the Revue française d'économie, CESifo Economic Studies, Journal of Pension Economics and Finance and Journal of Public Economic Theory. He has received numerous awards, including Belgum's presigious Francqui Prize in 1989.

In his research Pierre Pestieau primary concern has been the distributional implications of the fiscal or social policies. He also insists on the need to take into account the interactions of family, market and state. These two important topics are reflected in his past and ongoing work on the underground economy, social protection, inheritance taxes, retirement, long term care, fertility and marriage.

== Bibliography ==
=== Books ===
- The Performance of Public Enterprises: Concepts and Measurement. (with M. Marchand and H. Tulkens), North-Holland, Amsterdam, 1984, 296 p.
- Public Enterprise in Western Europe (with H. Parris and P. Saynor), Croom Helm, London, 1986, 197 p.
- L'Économie Informelle, (coed. with V. Ginsburgh), Labor Nathan, Bruxelles, 1987, 188 p.
- L'Économie Souterraine, Pluriel, Hachette, Paris, 1989, 320 p.
- Héritage et Transmissions Intergénérationnelles, (coed. with B. Jurion), De Boeck, Bruxelles, 1994, 286 p.
- Social Security and Retirement (with Robert Fenge), MIT Press, 2005.
- The Welfare State in the European Union: Economic and Social Perspectives, Oxford University Press, 2005.
- Pensions Strategies in Europe and the United States, (edited with R. Fenge and G. de Menil), MIT Press, 2008, 299 p.
- L’Etat-providence en Europe. Performance et dumping social (with Mathieu Lefebvre), Editions du CEPREMAP, Paris, 2012, 80 p.
- L’Etat providence. Défense et illustration, (with M. Lefebvre), PUF, Paris, 2017.
- The Welfare State in Europe, (with Mathieu Lefebvre) Oxford University Press, 2018, 240 p.
- "The public economics of changing longevity" Element, Cambridge University Press, 2022.
- The Economics of Social Protection, Cambridge University Press, 2023.
- Vivre heureux longtemps. Combien ça coûte? (with X. Flawinne), PUF, Paris 2022.
