= Albert Brachet =

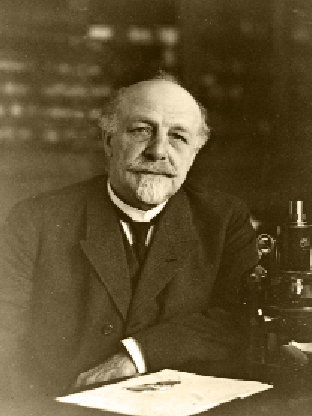

Albert Auguste Toussaint Brachet (1 January 1869 – 27 December 1930) was a Belgian physician and professor of anatomy and embryology at the Free University of Brussels (Université libre de Bruxelles, in its incarnation that operated 1834–1969). Brachet was a founder of the field of "causal embryology", the study of embryology and development using experiments.

Brachet was born in Liège of French ancestry. He studied medicine in Liège where he took an interest in embryology under Edouard van Beneden. He worked for a while as histology preparator for Auguste Swaen. He received his Doctor of Medicine in 1894 followed, by additional studies at the University of Edinburgh under Sir William Turner and then in Germany under Ernst Gaupp and Gustav Jacob Born. He returned to Liège and became an assistant in anatomy in 1895. He studied cranial development in the amphibians and reptiles.

Brachet moved from the descriptive embryology of his period to experimental approaches which involved experiments such as the removal of specific cells in the embryo to observe the alteration in development. He gave the approach the name of "causal embryology." In 1904, he became Chair of Anatomy and Embryology at Bruxelles where he worked until his death.

Brachet served as Rector of the Free University of Brussels from 1923 to 1926. His students included Pol Gerard, Maurice Herlant and Albert Dalcq. His son Jean Brachet became a physiologist and biochemist.
