= Pierre Gaspard =

Belgian physicist, professor

- Born: 6 December 1959 (age 66); Brussels, Belgium
- Education: Free University of Brussels (PhD, 1987)
- Known for: Statistical physics Chemical physics
- Parent(s): Walter Gaspard and Julia Jedwab
- Awards: 2006 Francqui Prize
- Scientific career
- Fields: Physics
- Workplaces: Free University of Brussels
- Thesis: Tangences homoclines dans les systèmes dynamiques dissipatifs: chaos et structure fractale de bifurcations (1987)
- Doctoral advisor: Grégoire Nicolis

Pierre Gaspard (born 6 December 1959) is a Belgian physicist and professor at the Interdisciplinary Center for Nonlinear Phenomena and Complex Systems and the Service de Physique Non-Linéaire and Mécanique Statistique of the Universite Libre de Bruxelles (ULB). His research interests are on nonlinear physics, statistical physics, and chemical physics.

Gaspard studied physics at the Université libre de Bruxelles (ULB) from 1978 to 1982, and completed his doctorate in physics in 1987, directed by Grégoire Nicolis. After postdoctoral studies at the University of Chicago he became a researcher with the National Fund for Scientific Research in 1989. He joined ULB as a lecturer in 1996; in 2004 he became a professor and gave up his researcher position.

He won the Théophile De Donder Prize of the Royal Academy of Science, Letters and Fine Arts of Belgium in 1988 and the Adolphe Wetrems Prize in 1995. In 2006, he was awarded the Francqui Prize on Exact Sciences for his work on statistical mechanics. He has been a member of the Royal Academy of Science, Letters and Fine Arts of Belgium since 2006.
