= Hubert Chantrenne =

Belgian scientist (1918–2007)

Hubert Chantrenne (1918–2007) was a Belgian scientist, and one of the pioneers of molecular biology at the Université libre de Bruxelles. He elucidated the messenger role played by the ribonucleic acid (RNA) in the synthesis of proteins in ribosome, organelles of the cellular cytoplasm. In 1963, he was awarded the Francqui Prize on Biological and Medical Sciences.
