= Marc Depaepe =

Marc Depaepe (born 3 February 1953) is a professor of pedagogy science at the KU Leuven and was from 2013 until 2017 vice- and campus rector of the Katholieke Universiteit Leuven.

== Life ==
He followed the lower secondary education at Sint-Amandschool (South) in Kortrijk and higher secondary education at the Sint-Jozefsinstituut in Torhout. At the University of Leuven, he graduated from the Master of Science (1977) and Doctor (1982) in Educational Sciences, with a special doctorate (1989) in this field. He became a researcher at the National Research Fund.

In 1996, he became a professor at the Faculty of Psychology and Educational Sciences at the KU Leuven and from 2004 at the Kulak.

His research focused on the following themes:

- Theory, methodology and historiography of "historical pedagogy" as a scientific discipline as well as a course in curricula.
- Internationally oriented science history of (psycho) pedagogy.
- History of education, education and training (and this policy) in Belgium (with emphasis on the elementary school).
- History of colonial and postcolonial education in Africa (focusing on the situation in the D.R. Congo).
- History of intercultural relations in education and education.

As for the speciality of 'historical pedagogy', he taught 'Modern Educational Systems' in Leuven and' 'History of Behavioral Sciences' and 'History of Education, Education and Training' 'in Kortrijk.

From 1 August 2013 until 31 July 2017 he was vice-rector of the KU Leuven, campus rector of the Kulak and academic manager of KU Leuven for the campuses of Bruges and Ostend.

He was active in numerous scientific organisations, among others

- Editor of the journal 'Paedagogica Historica: International Journal for the History of Education' (member of the editors since 1990);
- Director of the 'International Academy of Education'.

== Publications ==
=== Books ===
- On the Relationship of Theory and History in Pedagogy. An introduction to the West German discussion on the significance of the history of education (1950-1980), Leuven, Universitaire Pers, 1983.
- Meten om beter te weten? Geschiedenis van de experimenteelwetenschappelijke richting in de Westerse pedagogiek vanaf het einde van de 19de eeuw tot aan de Tweede Wereldoorlog (speciale doctoraatsthesis), Leuven, Afdeling Historische Pedagogiek, 1989.
- (m.m.v. R. LEFEBVRE & ZANA AZIZA ETEMBALA) "Tot Glorie van God en tot Zaligheid der Zielen". Brieven van Moeder Marie Adonia Depaepe over haar leven en werk als Zuster van Liefde in Belgisch Kongo (1909-1961), Antwerpen, Standaard Uitgeverij, 1992).
- Zum Wohl des Kindes? Pädologie, pädagogische Psychologie und experimentelle pädagogik in Europa und den USA, 1890-1940, Leuven, University Publications en Weinheim, Deutscher Studien Verlag, 1993
- De pedagogisering achterna. Aanzet tot een genealogie van de pedagogische mentaliteit in de voorbije 250 jaar, Leuven/Amersfoort, Acco, 1998, 1999, 2000, 2002, 2003, 2004
- Gesplitst of gespleten? De kloof tussen wetenschappelijke en praktische kennis over opvoeding en onderwijs, Leuven/Leusden, Acco, 2002.
- Vieja y nueva historia de la educación. Ensayos criticos , Barcelona, Octaedro, 2006.
- Sobre las relaciones de la teoría y la historia de la pedagogia. Una introducción al debate en Alemania Occidental sobre la relevancia de la Historia de la Educación (1950-1980), Presentación de Juan Sáez y José Garcia Molina, Valencia, Nau Llibres, 2007.
- Between Educationalization and Appropriation. Selected Writings on the History of Modern Educational Systems, With a Foreword by Marc Vervenne, Leuven, University Press, 2012.

== Honors ==
- Depaepe is a doctor honoris causa of the University of Latvia in Riga (2015).
- In 1993-1994, he was awarded the Sarton Medal in the University of Ghent.

== Family ==
Depaepe is married. Together they have 2 daughters and 5 grandchildren.

== Literature ==
- Laudatio Marc Depaepe door Frank SIMON
- Eredoctoraat Marc Depaepe aan de universiteit van Riga, 2015
