= Frans-H. van den Dungen =

Belgian scientist and professor

Frans-H. van den Dungen (1898–1965) was a Belgian scientist and professor at the Universite Libre de Bruxelles. In 1946 he was awarded the Francqui Prize on Exact Sciences.

Among his students was the mathematician Paul Dedecker.
