= Gilbert Vassart =

Belgian scientist and molecular endocrinologist

Gilbert Vassart (born 18 February 1944) is a Belgian scientist and professor emeritus at the Université libre de Bruxelles. His research has focused on molecular endocrinology, medical genetics and molecular pharmacology, particularly thyroid diseases and G protein-coupled receptors.

== Education and career ==
Vassart studied medicine at the Université libre de Bruxelles, graduating in 1969, and completed a PhD there in 1974.

He subsequently held a series of research appointments with the Belgian National Fund for Scientific Research. In 1983, he was appointed head of clinic at Erasme Hospital, and in 1988 became director of the university's medical genetics service.

Vassart directed the Laboratory of Medical Genetics at the Université libre de Bruxelles from 1990 to 2009 and the Institute of Interdisciplinary Research in Human and Molecular Biology from 2001 to 2009. He became professor emeritus in 2009.

== Honors and awards ==
- Honorary Doctor of Science from the University of Chicago (2004)
- Honorary doctorate from Université René Descartes (2000)
- Francqui Prize (1993)
- Van Geysel European award for biomedical research (2000)
