= Paul Dedecker =

Belgian mathematician (1921–2007)

- Born: 1921; Brussels
- Died: 2007 (aged 85–86); Caracas
- Occupation: Mathematician

Paul Dedecker (Brussels, 1921 – Caracas, 2007) was a Belgian mathematician who worked primarily in topology on the subjects of nonabelian cohomology, general category theory, variational calculus and its relations to homological algebra, exterior calculus on manifolds and mathematical physics.

He graduated in mathematics in 1948 at the Free University of Brussels, where he was a student of van den Dungen.

== Works ==
- Paul Dedecker, "Extension du groupe structural d'un espace fibré", Colloque de Topogie de Strasbourg (1955).
- Paul Dedecker, Variétés différentiables et espaces fibrés, Université de Liège, Liège : 1962.
- Paul Dedecker, "Sur la cohomologie non Abelienne, II", Canadian Journal of Mathematics, Vol. 15, No. 1 (1963), pp. 84–92.
- Paul Dedecker, Calcul des variations, formes différentielles et champs géodésiques, colloque international de géométrie différentielle, Strasbourg, CNRS : 1953.
- Paul Dedecker and Pierre Tison, Cours de topologie algébrique, fascicule 1, Caracas-Bruxelles-Lille : 1970.
- Paul Dedecker and Antoine Philippe, Cours de topologie algébrique, fascicule 2, Lille-Louvain-Santiage du Chili : 1970.
