= Jules Horrent =

Belgian scientist

Jules Horrent (11 April 1920 – 11 September 1981) was a Belgian medievalist, who was awarded the Francqui Prize in 1968 on Human Sciences for his historical work He worked in Romance studies, Hispanic studies, Italian studies, and Portuguese studies.
