= Raymond Jeener =

Belgian molecular biologist

Raymond Jeener (1904–1995) was a Belgian molecular biologist and professor at the Universite Libre de Bruxelles (ULB). He was the first to sketch out (in 1950) the possibility of what is now called messenger RNA, suggesting that small amounts of RNA move from cells' nuclei into the protoplasm, where in conjunction with ribosomes they lead to the synthesis of proteins.

In 1954, he was awarded the Francqui Prize on Biological and Medical Sciences.
