= Adolphe Van Tiggelen =

Belgian chemist (combustion processes)

Adolphe Van Tiggelen (1914–1969) was a Belgian scientist and professor at the University of Louvain (UCLouvain). He made important contributions to the understanding of flame processes. In 1961, he was awarded the Francqui Prize on Exact Sciences.

== See also ==
- Combustion Institute
