= Marc Parmentier =

Belgian biologist and professor

- Born: 24 March 1956 (age 70)
- Education: Université libre de Bruxelles (ULB)
- Scientific career
- Fields: Biological and Medical Sciences

Marc Parmentier (born 24 March 1956) is a Belgian scientist, and professor at the Institute of Multi-disciplinary Research in Human and Molecular Biology (IRIBHM) of the Université libre de Bruxelles (ULB), where he completed his PhD in 1990. His research interest is on G protein-coupled receptors (GPCR), and of transgenic models of human pathologies. In 1999, he was awarded the Francqui Prize on Biological and Medical Sciences.

== Awards ==
- 1985 – Marc Herlant prize
- 1991 – Galien Prize of Pharmacology
- 1993 – Belgian Endocrine Society Lecture
- 1994 – Harrington De Vishere prize of the European Thyroid Association
- 1997 – Merck Sharpe and Dohme Prize
- 1998 – Liliane Bettencourt Prize
- 1999 – Francqui Prize

== Publications ==
- Parmentier M, Libert F, Maenhaut C, Lefort A, Gérard C, Perret J, Van Sande J, Dumont JE and Vassart G., Molecular cloning of the thyrotropin receptor, Science 246 (1989), 1620–1622.
- Parmentier M, Libert F, Schurmans, S., Shiffmann S, Lefort A, Eggerickx D, Ledent C, Mollereau C, Gérard C, Perret J, Grootegoed JA, and Vassart G., Expression of members of the putative olfactory receptor gene family in mammalian germ cells, Nature 355 (1992), 453–455.
- Samson M, Libert F, Doranz BJ, Rucker J, Liesnard C, Farber CM, Saragosti S, Lapouméroulie C, Cogniaux J, Forceille C, Muyldermans G, Verhofstede C, Guy Burtonboy G, Georges M, Imai T, Rana S, Yi Y, Smyth RJ, Collman RG, Doms RW, Vassart G and Parmentier M. Resistance to HIV-1 infection of Caucasian individuals bearing mutant alleles of the CCR5 chemokine receptor gene, Nature 382 (1996) 722–725.
- Ledent C, Valverde O, Cossu G, Petitet F, Aubert JF, Beslot F, Böhme GA, Imperato A, Pedrazzini T, Roques BP, Vassart G, Fratta W, Parmentier M. Unresponsiveness to cannabinoids and reduced addictive effects of opiates in CB1 receptor knock out mice. Science 285 (1999) 401–404.

== Sources ==
- Marc Parmentier's profile at ULB (in French)
- Marc Parmentier (PDF)
