= Désiré Collen =

Belgian chemist, physician

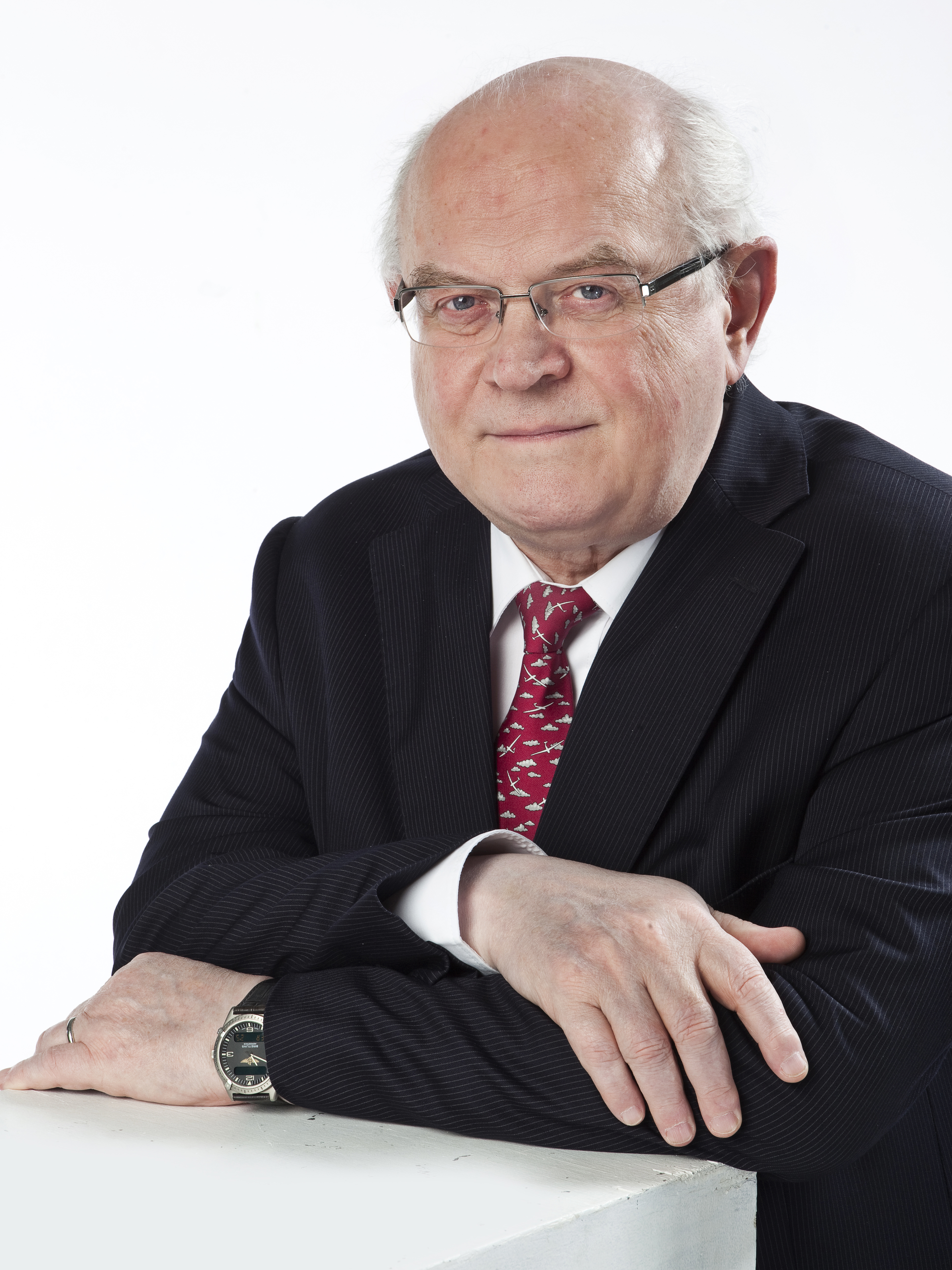
- Désiré Collen in 2012
- Born: Désiré Collen; 21 June 1943 (age 83); Sint-Truiden, Belgium
- Spouse: Louisa Reniers (m. 1966)
- Children: An Collen; Peter Collen; Christine Collen
- Scientific career
- Fields: Thrombosis/Thrombolysis; Biomedical research; Translational Research on Drug Development; Private equity funding of Life sciences companies

Désiré José Louis, Baron Collen (Sint-Truiden, 21 June 1943) is a Belgian emeritus professor of KU Leuven Faculty of Medicine, physician, chemist and biotech-entrepreneur. He made a variety of discoveries in the field of thrombosis, hemostasis and vascular biology. He gained international prominence in the 1980s and 1990s for the discovery of the potential of t-PA (tissue plasminogen activator) as a life-saving drug for patients with acute myocardial infarction (AMI) or heart attack, and cerebrovascular incidents (CVA) or stroke. Collen demonstrated that the enzyme t-PA, due to its high affinity for fibrin, dissolves blood clots in a patient's body, with less disruption of the overall blood clotting system than the previously available streptokinase. As a result, side effects such as heavy bleeding are markedly reduced. Through collaboration with the American company Genentech Inc., rt-PA (recombinant t-PA) was in the early eighties developed into one of the first genetically cloned drugs. Désiré Collen played a major role in the development of t-PA from a laboratory concept to a widely used life-saving drug. He has been rewarded with honorary degrees and awards for his work, and in 2013 he was awarded hereditary nobility with the personal title of baron by the then Belgian King Albert II.

Thanks to rt-PA, since it came on the market in 1987 as alteplase/ Activase®, hundreds of thousands of lives were saved. At the onset of the 21st century angioplasty and stenting were developed as alternatives or complements to the administration of t-PA as treatment for heart attacks and strokes. Presently rt-PA is however still used worldwide, mainly for cerebral infarction, and it is recognized by the World Health Organization (WHO) as one of the 'essential medicines'.

Until his retirement in 2008, Collen was affiliated with the Catholic University of Leuven (KU Leuven). He was the founder of the non-profit organization "D. Collen Research Foundation", presently "Life Sciences Research Partners, LSRP", and of the private foundation "Désiré Collen Stichting, DCS" presently recognized as a foundation of public utility (SON). He also founded the companies "Thromb-X NV", "ThromboGenics NV" (now "Oxurion NV") and the investment fund "Fundplus NV". In 2020 he founded the charity "Foundation for Education to improve Family Planning, FEFP", registered with the Charity Commission of England and Wales.

Désiré Collen was one of the biotech pioneers in Europe and one of the early ones in Belgium to combine academic research with entrepreneurship. He invested most of the proceeds of his work in scientific research, conferences, chairs, scholarships, university infrastructure, and philanthropy via LSRP, DCS and the "Collen Charitable Trust, CCT".

== Career ==
Désiré Collen obtained his doctorate in medicine at KU Leuven in 1968 and his master's in chemistry in 1969. Five years later, he obtained his doctorate in chemistry. Already during his undergraduate years, he worked as a research student in the Laboratory for Bleeding and Vascular Diseases of Professor Marc Verstraete.

In 1971-1972 he was a Research Scientist of the National Institutes of Health at the New York University Medical Center and in 1972-1973 worked as a NATO Research Fellow at the Karolinska Institute in Stockholm. After his military service, he became lecturer at the Faculty of Medicine of the KU Leuven in 1976 and deputy head of the Bleeding and Vascular Disease Section of the Department of Internal Medicine of the Leuven University Hospital.

Together with Professor Alfons Billiau of the Leuven Rega Institute, he discovered the special properties of the t-PA enzyme, and succeeded in purifying the enzyme together with colleagues Dick Rijken and Osamu Matsuo. In 1980, Collen, Rijken and Matsuo obtained a patent on the purification and use of human t-PA (US04752603).

In August 1980, Désiré Collen and KU Leuven concluded an agreement with the American company Genentech, which was pioneering in cloned medicines. Thanks to Genentech collaborator Diane Pennica, the DNA code of t-PA was unraveled, and the enzyme was developed and produced on an industrial scale into a life-saving drug (alteplase) that was approved by the FDA in 1987 under the name Activase®.

With an equal contribution of royalties by both, KU Leuven and Collen, the non-profit organization "D.Collen Research Foundation" was established in 1988, which financed among other things the construction of a research floor on the Gasthuisberg medical campus in Leuven.

Because rt-PA was an expensive drug, Collen and his longtime collaborator Professor Roger Lijnen found a cheaper alternative in staphylokinase, for the development of which Désiré Collen founded the company Thromb-X NV in 1991. However, due to insufficient funding for a costly phase 3 study with 15,000 patients, the project had to be abandoned. Staphylokinase research was however recently reactivated by Chinese, Russian and Czech research groups.

With his personal share of the t-PA royalties, Collen founded ThromboGenics NV in 1998, where among other things, ocriplasmin was developed for the treatment of vitreomacular adhesion of the retina in the eye. The American physician Steve Pakola was charged with the clinical development of ocriplasmin, Chris Buyse became Collen's financial right-hand man. After approval by the FDA, ocriplasmin was brought on the market under the brand name Jetrea®. ThromboGenics was successfully introduced on the Belgian stock exchange in 2006. However, in 2013 Collen left the company, dissatisfied with the commercial management and the Board's strategy.

In 1995, when the VIB (Flemish Institute for Biotechnology) was founded, Désiré Collen became director of the department "Transgene Technology and Gene Therapy", where with Professor Peter Carmeliet he achieved breakthroughs in the field of vascular biology and neurobiology, such as the role of VEGF (vascular endothelial growth factor) and PIGF (placental growth factor) in angiogenesis, cancer and ALS.

His scientific publications (he authored and co-authored over 650 papers) have been cited more than 80,000 times. Collen holds /held, amongst others, 18 US and 10 EU patents.

In 2015, together with a few investors and through his foundations DCS and LSRP, he set up "Fund+ NV", to invest in innovative companies in life sciences that have a proof of concept, and that over time could generate a return for investors.

== Academic Positions ==
- From 1981 to 2008 Professor at the Faculty of Medicine KU Leuven, Belgium.
- From 1984 to 2005 Professor of Biochemistry and Medicine at the College of Medicine in Burlington VT, USA.
- From 1987 to 1994 visiting Professor of Medicine at Harvard Medical School in Boston MA, USA.
- From 1987 to 2005 Medical consultant at the Massachusetts General Hospital in Boston MA, USA.
- From 1999 to 2002 visiting Professor for Surgery and Anesthesia at the United Medical and Dental Schools of Guy's and St Thomas Hospitals in Londen, UK.

== Honours and honorary titles ==
- Francqui Prize in Biological and Medical Sciences, Belgium, 1984.
- Louis-Jeantet Prize for Medicine from the Louis-Jeantet Foundation, Switzerland,1986.
- Honorary doctorate from the Erasmus University in Rotterdam, The Netherlands, 1988.
- Honorary doctorate from the VUB, Belgium, 1994.
- Bristol-Meyers Squibb Award for cardiovascular research, together with Professor Marc Verstraete, New York, USA, 1994.
- Honorary doctorate from the University of Notre Dame, Indiana, USA, 1995.
- Honorary doctorate of the Université de la Méditerranée, Marseille, France, 1999.
- Inbev-Baillet Latour Health Prize together with Peter Carmeliet, Belgium, 2005.
- Harvard Leadership Prize of the Harvard Club of Belgium, 2007.
- Insead Innovator Prize, Belgium, 2009.
- Robert P. Grant Medal, International Society for Thrombosis and Hemostasis, 2011.
- Lifetime achievement award from Belcham (New York NY, USA) and from Scrip (London, UK), 2013.
- In July 2013, King Albert II granted Désiré Collen hereditary nobility with the personal title of baron.

== Books ==
Collen's memoires (in Dutch) 'Een hart voor onderzoek en ondernemen' were published in 2009 by VandenBroele (ISBN 978-90-496-0056-3). Désiré Collen, biotechpionier (in Dutch) was published in 2018 by LannooCampus (ISBN 978-94-014-5353-0).
