= Jean Brachet =

Belgian biochemist (1909–1988)

Jean Brachet FRS
- Born: Jean Brachet; 19 March 1909; Etterbeek, Belgium
- Died: 10 August 1988 at 79 years
- Education: L'École alsacienne, Paris; Université libre de Bruxelles
- Known for: Role of RNA in protein synthesis
- Scientific career
- Fields: Molecular biology
- Workplaces: Free University of Brussels (Note: Not the post-1969 Université libre de Bruxelles, but its predecessor institution.); University of Cambridge; Princeton University; Several institutes of marine biological research; Professor of Animal Morphology and General Biology at the Université libre de Bruxelles; Research Director of the International Laboratory for Genetics and Biophysics in Naples

Jean Louis Auguste Brachet (19 March 1909 – 10 August 1988) was a Belgian biochemist who made a key contribution in understanding the role of RNA.

== Life ==
Brachet was born in Etterbeek near Brussels in Belgium, the son of Albert Brachet, an eminent embryologist.

He was educated at L'École alsacienne in Paris and the Royal Athenaeum of Ixelles in Brussels. He studied medicine at the Université libre de Bruxelles ('Free University of Brussels', the institution operating between 1834 and 1969), graduating in 1934. He then worked at the University of Cambridge and at Princeton University and at several institutes of marine biological research.

Brachet was appointed Professor of Animal Morphology and General Biology at the Université libre de Bruxelles and Research Director of the International Laboratory for Genetics and Biophysics in Naples.

In 1933 Brachet was able to show that DNA was found in chromosomes and that RNA was present in the cytoplasm of all cells.

At the same time as Torbjörn Caspersson he independently showed that RNA plays an active role in protein synthesis. Brachet also carried out pioneering work in the field of cell differentiation. Brachet demonstrated that differentiation is preceded by the formation of new ribosomes and accompanied by the release from the nucleus of a wave of new messenger RNA.

In 1934 he married Françoise de Baray. In 2004, his daughter Lise Brachet published a biography of her father.

In 1948 Jean Brachet was awarded the Francqui Prize for Biological and Medical Sciences and in 1953 he received the Albert Brachet Prize from the Royal Academy of Belgium for the best original work in embryology, an award instituted in honour of his father. He was elected a fellow of the Royal Society in 1966.

== Publications ==
- Étude histochimique des protéines au cours du développement embryonnaire des Poissons, des Amphibiens, et des Oiseaux, Archives de Biologie 51, 167-202
- Embryologie Chimique (1944)
- Biological Cytology (1957)
- Introduction to Molecular Embryology (1957)
- Molecular Cytology (2 vols.) (1985)
