= Science and technology in Flanders =

Science and technology in Flanders, being the Flemish Community and more specifically the northern region of Belgium (Europe), is well developed with the presence of several universities and research institutes. These are strongly spread over all Flemish cities, from Kortrijk and Bruges in the Western side, over Ghent as a major university center alongside Antwerp, Brussels and Leuven to Hasselt and Diepenbeek in the Eastern side.

== Institutes of higher education in the Flemish community ==
=== Universities ===
Six Flemish universities issue academic bachelor, master and doctoral degrees on a broad range of disciplines:

- University of Antwerp ('UA'), Antwerp
- Hogeschool-Universiteit Brussel ('HUB'), Brussels (former Katholieke Universiteit Brussel)
- Vrije Universiteit Brussel, ('VUB') Brussels
- Ghent University ('UGent'), Ghent
- Hasselt University, Hasselt
- KU Leuven, Leuven and Katholieke Universiteit Leuven Campus Kortrijk, Kortrijk

As a result of an international treaty between the Netherlands and Flanders, a co-operation between the Universiteit Hasselt (Flanders) and the Maastricht University (the Netherlands) is recognised as the

- Transnational University Limburg, Hasselt

According to the Webometrics Ranking of World Universities and the THES - QS World University Rankings, four Flemish universities (Universiteit Antwerpen, Vrije Universiteit Brussel, Universiteit Gent and Katholieke Universiteit Leuven) are among the top-150 universities in Europe and top-300 universities worldwide.

=== University colleges ===
All recognised Flemish university colleges are associated with a Flemish university. The following colleges, which issue professional bachelor, academic bachelor's and master's degrees, are recognised by the Flemish government:

Antwerp University Association: University Colleges associated with the University of Antwerp

- Artesis Hogeschool Antwerpen (Antwerp, Merksem, Lier, Mechelen, Turnhout), public
- Hogere Zeevaartschool Antwerpen (Antwerp), public
- Karel de Grote-Hogeschool (Antwerp), catholic
- Plantijn Hogeschool (Antwerpen, Boom), public

Ghent University Association: University Colleges associated with Ghent University

- Arteveldehogeschool (Ghent), catholic
- Hogeschool Gent (Ghent, Aalst, Melle), public
- Hogeschool West-Vlaanderen (Bruges, Kortrijk), public

University Association Brussels: University Colleges associated with Vrije Universiteit Brussel

- Erasmushogeschool Brussel (Brussels), public

KU Leuven Association: University Colleges associated with Katholieke Universiteit Leuven

- Groep T Hogeschool (Leuven), catholic
- Hogeschool-Universiteit Brussel (Brussels), catholic
- Hogeschool Sint-Lukas Brussel (Brussels), catholic
- Hogeschool voor Kunsten en Architectuur (Brussels, Ghent, Leuven, Genk), catholic
- Katholieke Hogeschool Brugge-Oostende (Bruges, Ostend), catholic
- Katholieke Hogeschool Kempen (Geel, Lier, Turnhout, Vorselaar), catholic
- Katholieke Hogeschool Leuven (Leuven, Diest), catholic
- Katholieke Hogeschool Limburg (Diepenbeek, Hasselt, Genk), catholic
- Katholieke Hogeschool Mechelen (Mechelen), catholic
- Katholieke Hogeschool Sint-Lieven (Ghent, Aalst, Sint-Niklaas), catholic
- Katholieke Hogeschool Zuid-West-Vlaanderen, (Kortrijk, Roeselare, Tielt, Torhout), catholic
- Lessius Hogeschool (Antwerp, Sint-Katelijne-Waver), catholic

Limburg University Association: University Colleges associated with Hasselt University

- Provinciale Hogeschool Limburg (Hasselt, Diepenbeek), public
- XIOS Hogeschool Limburg (Diepenbeek, Hasselt), public

=== Registered institutes of higher education ===
Finally, the Flemish government has recognised a number of "registered" institutes of higher education, which mostly issue specialised degrees or provide education mainly in a foreign language:

- College of Europe (Bruges): postgraduate degree in European studies
- Continental Theological Seminary (Sint-Pieters-Leeuw)
- Evangelical Theological Faculty (Leuven): BA, MA and PhD studies on theology
- Brussels Faculty for Protestant Theology (Brussels): BA, MA and PhD studies on theology
- Flanders Business School (Antwerp)
- Prince Leopold Institute of Tropical Medicine (Antwerp), postgraduate degrees taught in French and English
- Vesalius College (Brussels)
- Vlerick Leuven Gent Management School (Leuven, Ghent): MBA and other management degrees taught in English and Dutch.

== Technology funding ==
The following institutions provide various forms of public funding for research and development:

- Institute for the promotion of Innovation by Science and Technology (IWT)
- Flemish Council for Science Policy (VRWB)

== Technology institutes ==
Flanders is home to several science and technology institutes.

- Interuniversity Microelectronics Centre (IMEC)
- Flanders District of Creativity (Flanders DC)
- Flanders DRIVE
- Flanders Institute for Logistics (VIL)
- Flanders' Mechatronics Technology Centre (FMTC)
- Flanders Multimedia Valley
- Flemish Innovation Center for Graphic Communication
- Interdisciplinary institute for BroadBand Technology (IBBT)
- Flanders Interuniversity Institute of Biotechnology (VIB)
- Flemish Institute for Technological Research (VITO)
- Technopolis
- Von Karman Institute for Fluid Dynamics
- Instituut voor Tropische Geneeskunde

== Science parks ==
Several science parks associated with the universities are spread over Flanders:

- Arenberg Research-Park
- Greenbridge science park
- Haasrode Research-Park
- Innotek
- Limburg Science Park
- Waterfront Researchpark
- Zwijnaarde science park

== See also ==
- Science and technology in Belgium
- Science and technology in the Brussels-Capital Region
- Science and technology in Wallonia
- Belgian Federal Science Policy Office (BELSPO)
- Economy of Belgium
- Agoria
- Ghent Bio-Energy Valley
- Science Parks of Wallonia
