= List of universities in Belgium =

This is a list of universities in Belgium. In Belgium, which is a federal state, the constitution attributes legislative power over higher education to the Communities. The Dutch-speaking Flemish Community, the French Community and the German Community thus determine which institutes of higher education they organise or recognise, and which diplomas may be legally issued by these institutes. Below is a list of recognised institutes of higher education in Belgium sorted by the responsible Community.

== Institutes of higher education in the Flemish Community ==
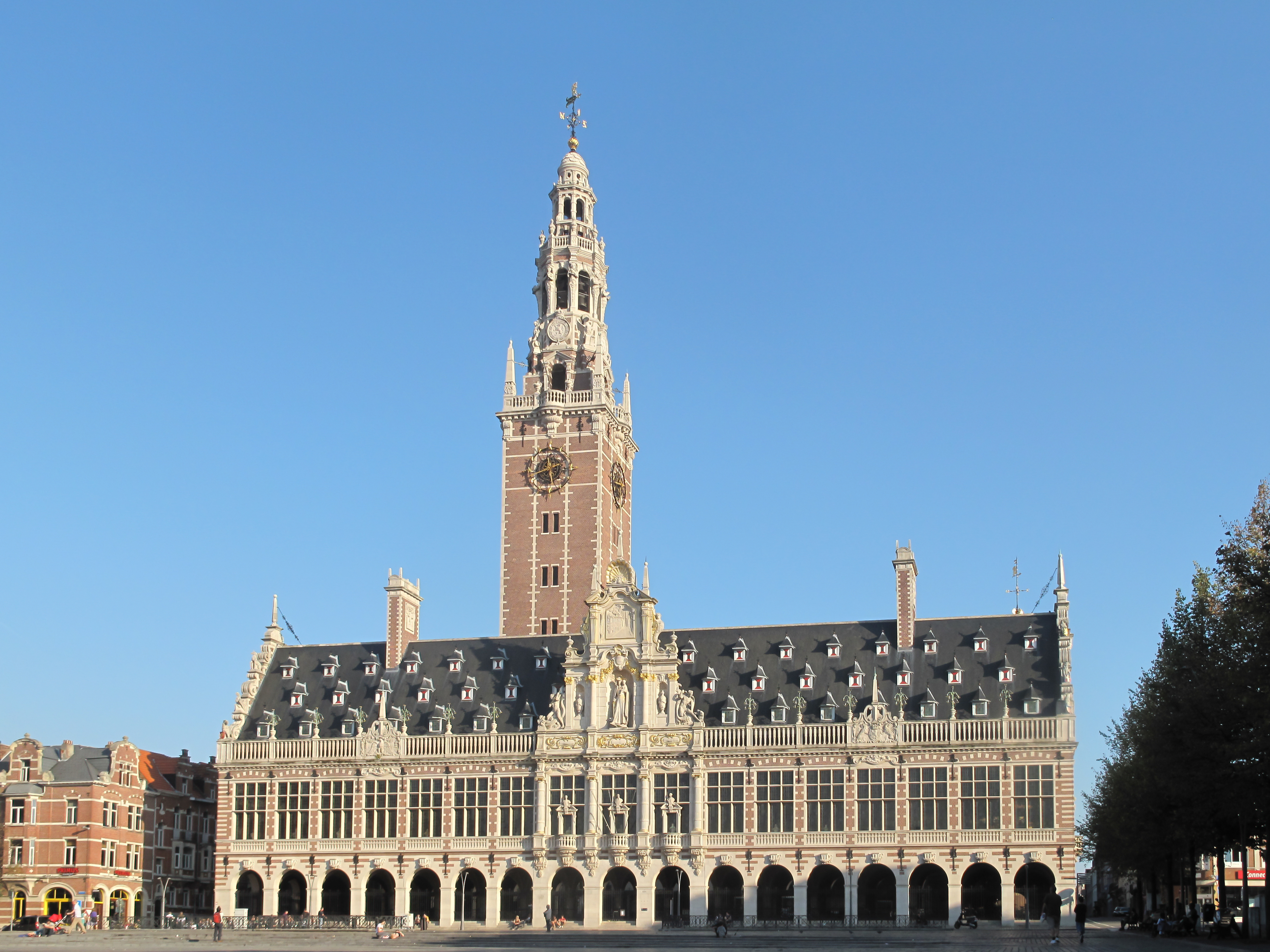
The Central Library of the KU Leuven

=== Universities ===
Five Flemish universities issue academic bachelor, master and doctoral degrees:

- University of Antwerp, Antwerp
- Vrije Universiteit Brussel, Ixelles, Anderlecht, Jette, Gooik
- Ghent University, Ghent
- Hasselt University, Hasselt and Diepenbeek
- Katholieke Universiteit Leuven, Leuven, Brussels, Antwerp, Geel, Sint-Katelijne-Waver, Ghent, Kortrijk, Bruges and Diepenbeek

As a result of an international treaty between the Netherlands and Flanders, a co-operation between the Hasselt University (Flanders) and the Maastricht University (the Netherlands) is recognised as the

- Transnational University Limburg, Hasselt

According to the Webometrics Ranking of World Universities and the THES - QS World University Rankings, four Flemish universities (University of Antwerp, Vrije Universiteit Brussel, Ghent University and KU Leuven) are among the top 150 universities in Europe and top 300 universities worldwide.

=== University colleges ===
All recognised Flemish university colleges (hogescholen) are associated with a Flemish university. The following university colleges, which issue professional bachelor, academic bachelor's and master's degrees, are recognised by the Flemish government:

Antwerp University Association: university colleges associated with the University of Antwerp

- Artesis Plantijn Hogeschool Antwerpen (Antwerp), public
- Hogere Zeevaartschool Antwerpen (Antwerp), public
- Karel de Grote-Hogeschool - Katholieke Hogeschool Antwerpen (Antwerp), Catholic

Ghent University Association: university colleges associated with Ghent University

- Arteveldehogeschool (Ghent), Catholic
- Hogeschool Gent (Ghent, Aalst, Melle), public
- Hogeschool West-Vlaanderen (Bruges, Kortrijk), public

University Association Brussels: public university college associated with Vrije Universiteit Brussel

- Erasmushogeschool Brussel (Brussels)

K.U.Leuven Association: catholic university colleges associated with Katholieke Universiteit Leuven

- Odisee (Dilbeek, Aalst, Brussels, Ghent, Sint-Niklaas)
- LUCA School of Arts (Genk, Ghent, Leuven, Brussels)
- Thomas More Kempen (Geel, Lier, Turnhout, Vorselaar)
- Thomas More Mechelen-Antwerpen (Antwerp, Mechelen, Sint-Katelijne-Waver)
- UC Leuven-Limburg (Diepenbeek, Leuven, Genk, Hasselt, Diest)
- Katholieke Hogeschool VIVES (Kortrijk, Bruges, Roeselare, Ostend)

Limburg University and College Association: public university college associated with Hasselt University

- Hogeschool PXL (Hasselt, Diepenbeek, Genk)

=== Registered institutes of higher education ===
Finally, the Flemish government has recognised a number of "registered" institutes of higher education, which mostly issue specialised degrees or provide education mainly in a foreign language:

- Antwerp Management School (Antwerp)
- College of Europe (Bruges)
- Continental Theological Seminary (Sint-Pieters-Leeuw)
- Evangelical Theological Faculty (Leuven)
- Brussels Faculty for Protestant Theology (Brussels)
- Flanders Business School (Antwerp)
- Prince Leopold Institute of Tropical Medicine (Antwerp)
- Vesalius College (Brussels)
- Vlerick Leuven Gent Management School (Leuven, Ghent)

== Institutes of higher education in the French Community ==
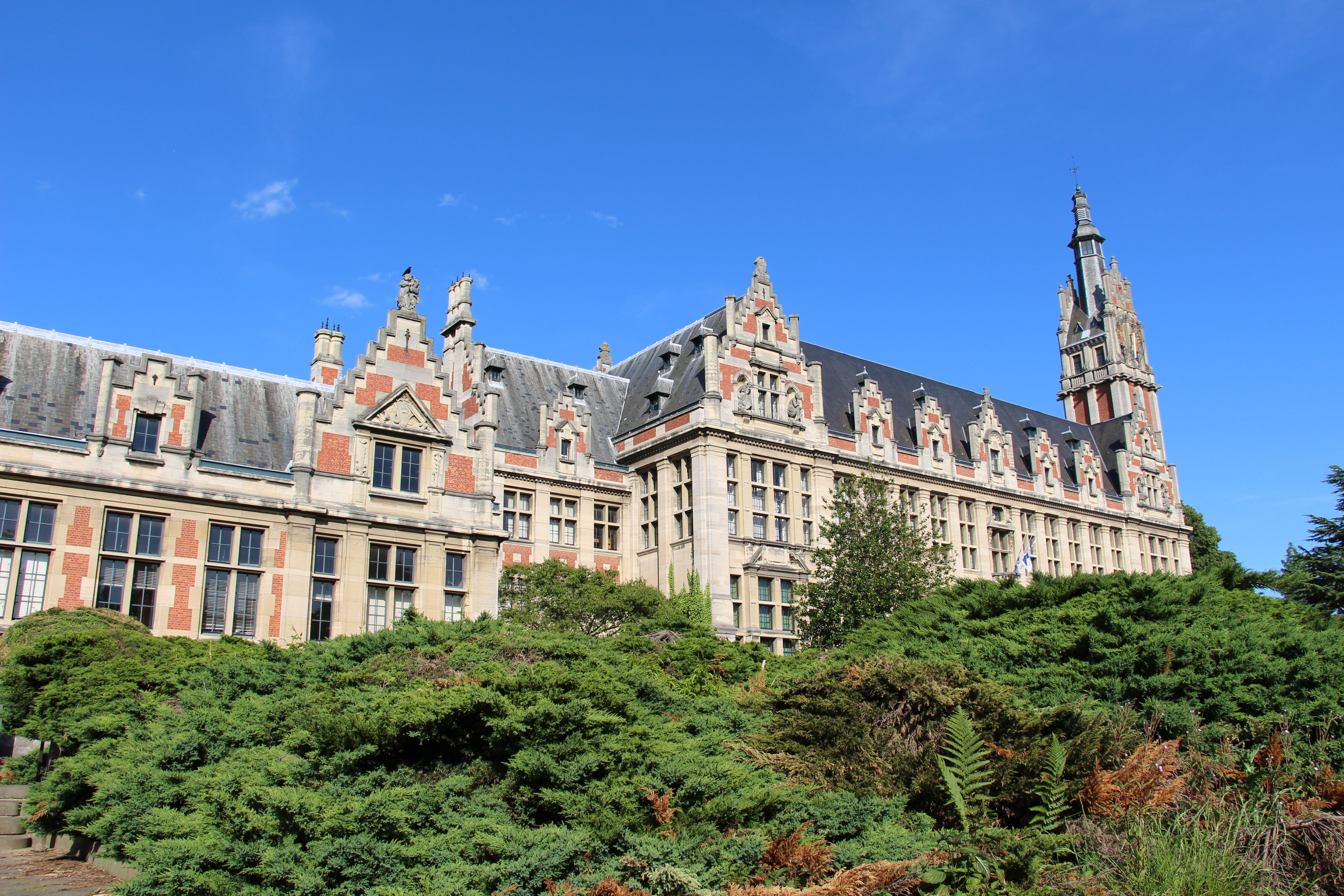
Université libre de Bruxelles (ULB)

The French Community distinguishes between universities, colleges (Hautes Écoles) and arts colleges (Écoles supérieures des Arts). A list of all recognised institutes is maintained in the Annuaire de l'enseignement supérieur.

=== Universities ===
- Université de Namur (UNamur), Namur
- Saint-Louis University, Brussels (UCLouvain), Brussels
- Université catholique de Louvain (UCLouvain), Louvain-la-Neuve, Brussels, Mons, Tournai, Charleroi and Namur
- University of Liège (ULiège), Liège, Gembloux and Arlon
- University of Mons (UMons), Mons
- Université libre de Bruxelles (ULB), Brussels
- Faculté universitaire de théologie protestante (FUTP), Etterbeek (recognised by both communities, its diplomas are not delivered by the French community)

According to the Academic Ranking of World Universities, two of these universities (Université catholique de Louvain and Université libre de Bruxelles) are among the top 150 universities worldwide.

According to the Webometrics Ranking of World Universities, two of these universities (Université catholique de Louvain and University of Liège) are among the top 150 universities in Europe and top 350 universities worldwide.

=== University colleges ===
- Haute École Francisco Ferrer, Brussels
- Haute École Bruxelles-Brabant, Brussels and Nivelles
- Haute École Galilée, Brussels
- Haute École Léonard de Vinci, Brussels
- Haute École Lucia de Brouckère, Brussels
- Haute École ICHEC - ECAM - ISFSC, Brussels
- Haute École libre de Bruxelles - Ilya Prigogine, Brussels
- École pratique des hautes études commerciales, Brussels and Louvain-la-Neuve
- Haute École Charlemagne, Liège, Huy, Gembloux, Verviers
- Haute École libre Mosane - HELMo, Liège, Huy, Verviers, Theux and Ans
- Haute École de la Ville de Liège, Liège
- Haute École de la Province de Liège, Liège, Seraing, Theux, Verviers and Huy
- Haute École Albert Jacquard, Namur and Tamines
- Haute École de la Province de Namur, Namur and Ciney
- Haute École de Namur-Liège-Luxembourg, Namur, Arlon, Bastogne, Marche-en-Famenne, Seraing, Virton
- Haute École Robert Schuman, Arlon, Libramont-Chevigny, Virton
- Haute École Louvain en Hainaut, Mons, Louvain-la-Neuve, Braine-le-Compte, La Louvière, Charleroi, Gerpinnes, Leuze-en-Hainaut, Mouscron, and Tournai
- Haute École de la Communauté française en Hainaut, Mons and Tournai
- Haute École provinciale de Hainaut Condorcet, Mons, Ath, Saint-Ghislain, Charleroi, Mouscron, Froyennes and Morlanwelz

=== Arts colleges ===
- Académie Royale des Beaux-Arts de Bruxelles - École Supérieure des Arts, Brussels
- Conservatoire Royal de Bruxelles - École Supérieure des Arts, Brussels
- Institut National Supérieur des Arts du Spectacle et des techniques de diffusion (INSAS), Brussels
- École Nationale Supérieure des Arts Visuels de La Cambre, Brussels
- École de Recherche Graphique - École Supérieure des Arts (ERG), Saint-Gilles
- Instituts Saint-Luc de Bruxelles - École Supérieure des Arts, Saint-Gilles
- École Supérieure des Arts du Cirque, Auderghem
- Le 75, Woluwe-Saint-Lambert
- Institut des Arts de Diffusion (IAD), Louvain-la-Neuve
- Royal Conservatory of Liège, Liège
- École Supérieure des Arts de la Ville de Liège, Liège
- École Superieure des Arts Saint-Luc de Liège, Liège
- Institut Supérieur de Musique et de Pédagogie, Namur
- Arts², Mons
- Académie des Beaux-Arts de Tournai
- École Supérieure des Arts Saint-Luc Tournai, Tournai

== Institutes of higher education in the German-speaking Community ==
A single college is operated by the German-speaking Community of Belgium:

- Autonome Hochschule Ostbelgien, Eupen

== Federal institutions ==
The school of the Belgian Armes Forces officers is organised by Belgium's Federal Government, and has the status of university:

- Royal Military Academy, Brussels

== Institutes recognised by foreign countries ==
The following institutes are not recognised by the Flemish or French speaking communities, but by a foreign country:

- American University, Brussels Center for European Studies (headquarters: Washington, District of Columbia, United States)
- University of Kent's Brussels School of International Studies (headquarters: Canterbury, United Kingdom)
- Business University, Brussels (headquarters: San Jose, Costa Rica)

== Institutions with external validation ==
The following academic institutions offer accredited degree programmes which are externally validated by foreign institutions of higher education and learning:

- Bhaktivedanta College, Durbuy (degrees externally validated by the University of Chester, UK)
- International School of Protocol and Diplomacy, Brussels (degrees externally awarded by the Universidad Camilo José Cela, Spain)
- United Business Institutes, Brussels (degrees externally validated by Middlesex University, UK)

== International rankings ==
Below are shown the international rankings of the Dutch-speaking and French-speaking universities in Belgium, and the number of times they rank in the top 200 of one of the six prominent global rankings:

University	QS World (2027)	THE World (2026)	ARWU World (2026)	USNWR World (2026–27)	CWTS Leiden (2025)	CWUR World (2026)	#^{a}
Dutch-speaking universities
Catholic University of Leuven	59	46	87	48	67	98	6^{c}
Ghent University	150=	115	98	104	110	137	6^{b}
University of Antwerp	277=	170=	201-300	206=	415	303	1
Free University of Brussels	295	201–250	201-300	364=	538	443	0
University of Hasselt	639=	301–350	701-800	912=	1141	830	0
French-speaking universities
Université catholique de Louvain	196=	184=	201-300	216=	365	252	2
Université libre de Bruxelles	248	201–250	101-150	275=	480	263	1
University of Liège	364=	301–350	401-500	421=	514	307	0
University of Mons	801-850	601–800	801-900^{d}	1142=	N.A.	1187	0
University of Namur	801-850	801–1000	N.A.	1500=	N.A.	1540	0
Saint-Louis University, Brussels	N.A.	N.A.	N.A.	N.A.	N.A.	N.A.	0

Notes:
N.A.: Not Applicable
^{a} Number of times the university is ranked within the top 200 of one of the six global rankings.
^{b} The university is ranked within the top 150 of all six global rankings.
^{c} The university is ranked within the top 100 of all six global rankings.
^{d} ARWU World Rankings 2023 (rankings thereafter are not available).

== See also ==
- Belgian American Educational Foundation (BAEF)
- Education in Belgium
- List of Belgian Nobel laureates
- List of colleges and universities
- List of colleges and universities by country
- List of faculties of law in Belgium
- Universities in Leuven
- Science and technology in Belgium
- University Foundation
- Open access in Belgium
