= Science and technology in Brussels =

Science and technology in Brussels, the central region of Belgium (Europe), is well developed with the presence of several universities and research institutes.

== Technology institutes and universities ==
=== Technology institutes ===
The Brussels-Capital Region is home to several national science and technology institutes.

- National Fund for Scientific Research (NFWO/FNRS)
- Institute for the Encouragement of Scientific Research and Innovation of Brussels (ISRIB)
- Francqui Foundation
- Queen Elisabeth Medical Foundation
- Royal Academies for Science and the Arts of Belgium (RASAB)
- Belgian Academy Council of Applied Sciences (BACAS)
- Von Karman Institute for Fluid Dynamics

=== Universities ===
Funded by the Flemish government, teaching in Dutch and (for some post-graduate programs) in English:

- Vrije Universiteit Brussel (VUB) with its partner college Erasmushogeschool Brussel (EhB).
- Katholieke Universiteit Leuven (KU Leuven) campus Brussel (human sciences) and campus Sint-Lukas Brussel (architecture) with its partner college Odisee.

Funded by the government of the French Community, teaching in French and in English, with some programmes in Dutch:

- Université libre de Bruxelles (ULB) in Brussels, Ixelles and Anderlecht.
- Université Saint-Louis - Bruxelles (UCLouvain) in Brussels and Ixelles.
- Université catholique de Louvain's (UCLouvain) Brussels Woluwe medical campus and architecture campus in Saint-Gilles.

== Science parks ==
Several science parks associated with the universities are spread over the Brussels-Capital Region.

== See also ==
- Agoria
- Belgian Federal Science Policy Office (BELSPO)
- Economy of Belgium
- Science and technology in Belgium
- Science and technology in Flanders
- Science and technology in Wallonia
