= University Foundation =

Belgian education foundation

University Foundation Logo

The Belgian University Foundation (French: Fondation Universitaire; Dutch: Universitaire Stichting) was founded in 1920. The goal of the Foundation, as was put forward by Emile Francqui, is to promote scientific activity at Belgian universities.

== Goals ==
1. To provide grants and study loans to students from less privileged families.
2. To help university research centres and laboratories to attract young researchers.
3. To stimulate contacts and collaboration between the different Belgian research institutions by supporting scientific publications.
4. To organize a Club Universitaire as a meeting place for Belgian and foreign academics.

== History ==
The money for the foundation came from the remaining funds from the Commission for Relief in Belgium (CRB) and the National Committee for Help and Food. The help to the Belgian people during World War I had been organized by Herbert Hoover and Emile Francqui

On 28 August 1919, Herbert Hoover proposed to Emile Francqui, President of the National Committee for Help and Food, and to Léon Delacroix, Prime Minister of Belgium, to use the funds, roughly 150 million Belgian francs, to support university education. The Belgian government decided to give twenty million to each of the four universities, and to use 55 million francs to establish the University Foundation. The remaining funds were used to set up the Belgian American Educational Foundation (BAEF). The first president of the Foundation was Emile Francqui.

== Building ==
The building is located in Brussels (Rue d'Egmont 11). It was designed by the architect Ernest Jaspar and includes a club, a hotel and a restaurant. There are other institutions located on the premises of the University Foundation like the Belgian American Educational Foundation (BAEF), the Olivaint Conference of Belgium, the Coimbra Group, UNICA, the Organisation of European Cancer Institutes (OECI), and the European Nuclear Education Network.

== See also ==
- Science and technology in Belgium
- Francqui Foundation
- Academia Belgica
- Belgian Academy Council of Applied Sciences
- National Fund for Scientific Research
- List of universities in Belgium
- List of Belgian Nobel laureates

=== Other Belgian clubs ===
- Cercle Royal du Parc
- Cercle de Lorraine
- De Warande
