= Society and Technology Institute =

The Society and Technology Institute (Dutch: Instituut Samenleving en Technologie) was from 2000 until 2013 a Flemish institute. The institute was associated with the Flemish Parliament, for which it provided advice on complex issues involving society and technology.

Until 2008 it was called the Flemish Institute for Scientific and Technological Aspect research (Dutch: Vlaams Instituut voor Wetenschappelijk en Technologisch Aspectenonderzoek, viWTA).

The Flemish Parliament abolished the institute per 1 January 2013. The technology assessment function and several employees were transferred to the Flemish Institute for Technological Research.

== See also ==
- Belgian Academy Council of Applied Sciences
- Flemish Council for Science and Innovation (VRWI)
- Flemish Institute for Technological Research (VITO)
- Science and technology in Flanders
