= Cercle royal Gaulois artistique et littéraire =

Artistic club in Brussels, Belgium

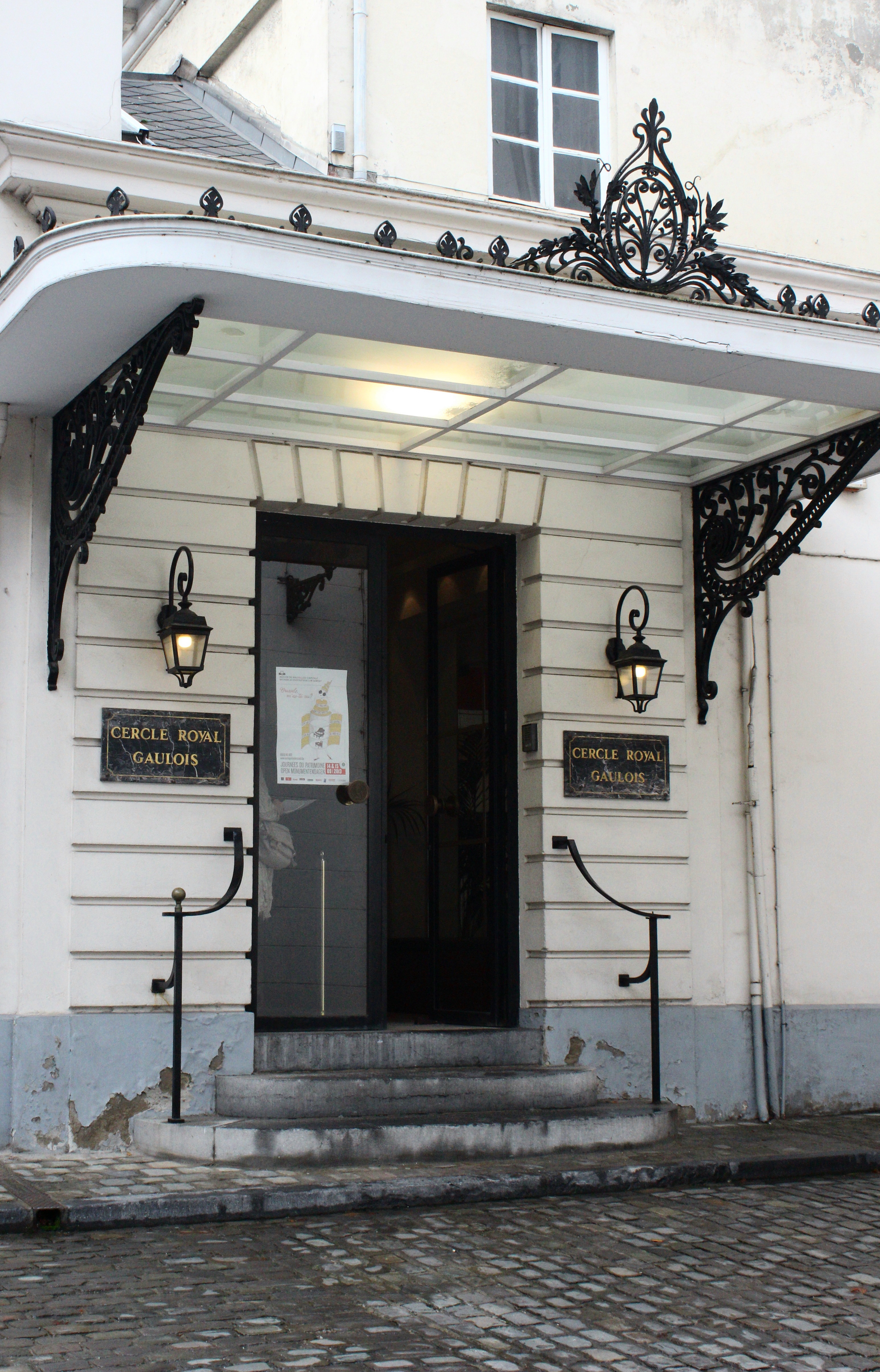
- Front entrance
- Founded: 1848; 178 years ago
- Type: Private members club

The Cercle Gaulois, in full the Cercle royal Gaulois artistique et littéraire (lit. 'Royal Gallic Artistic and Literary Circle'), is a Belgian club in Brussels that promotes art. The club has the aim of constituting a friendly, intellectual, artistic and literary meeting place, free of any political, cultural or philosophical tendency. Its current president is Philippe de Wouters d'Oplinter.

The club is located at 5, rue de la Loi/Wetstraat, in the historic Vauxhall building in Brussels Park, behind the Royal Park Theatre.

== History ==
The Cercle royal artistique et littéraire ("Royal Artistic and Literary Circle") was founded in Brussels on 23 November 1848. The Cercle de la Toison d'Or ("Circle of the Golden Fleece") was founded in Brussels on 23 December 1911, and its name was changed to the Cercle Gaulois ("Gallic Circle") on 13 June 1919. The Cercle Gaulois became the Cercle royal Gaulois ("Royal Gallic Circle") by authorisation of King Leopold III on 16 February 1937. In 1950, the Cercle royal Gaulois merged with the Cercle royal artistique et littéraire and changed its name to the Cercle royal Gaulois artistique et littéraire ("Royal Gallic Artistic and Literary Circle").

== Functions ==
Today, the club serves many purposes. It organises concerts, exhibitions and conferences in which all forms of art are represented, including culinary art. Following a tradition that dates back to 1971, every Tuesday evening, a club member is appointed master of fine dining. This member creates a menu together with a head chef and presents it to the guests. At the end of the meal, this member is appraised.

== Notable members ==
- Étienne Davignon
- Armand Dedecker (died in 2019)
- Albert Frère (died in 2018)
- Derrick Gosselin
- Pierre Harmel (died in 1977)
- Tony Mary
- Gérard Mestrallet
- Diego du Monceau de Bergendal
- Michel Tilmant
- Karel Van Miert (died in 2009)
- Alain Siaens
- André Antoine
- Paul Buysse (died in 2023)
- Mark Eyskens

== Gallery ==
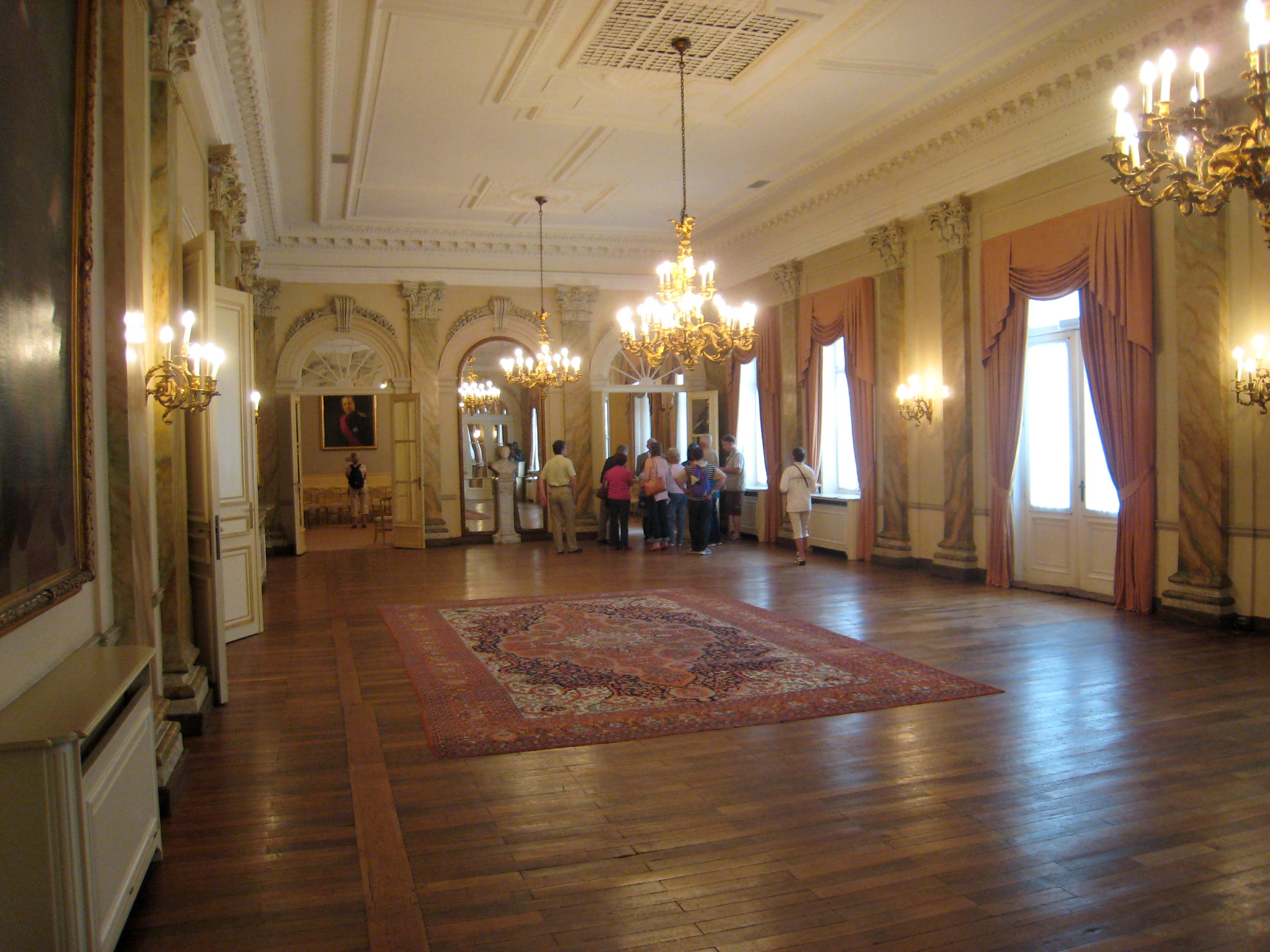
Inside the club

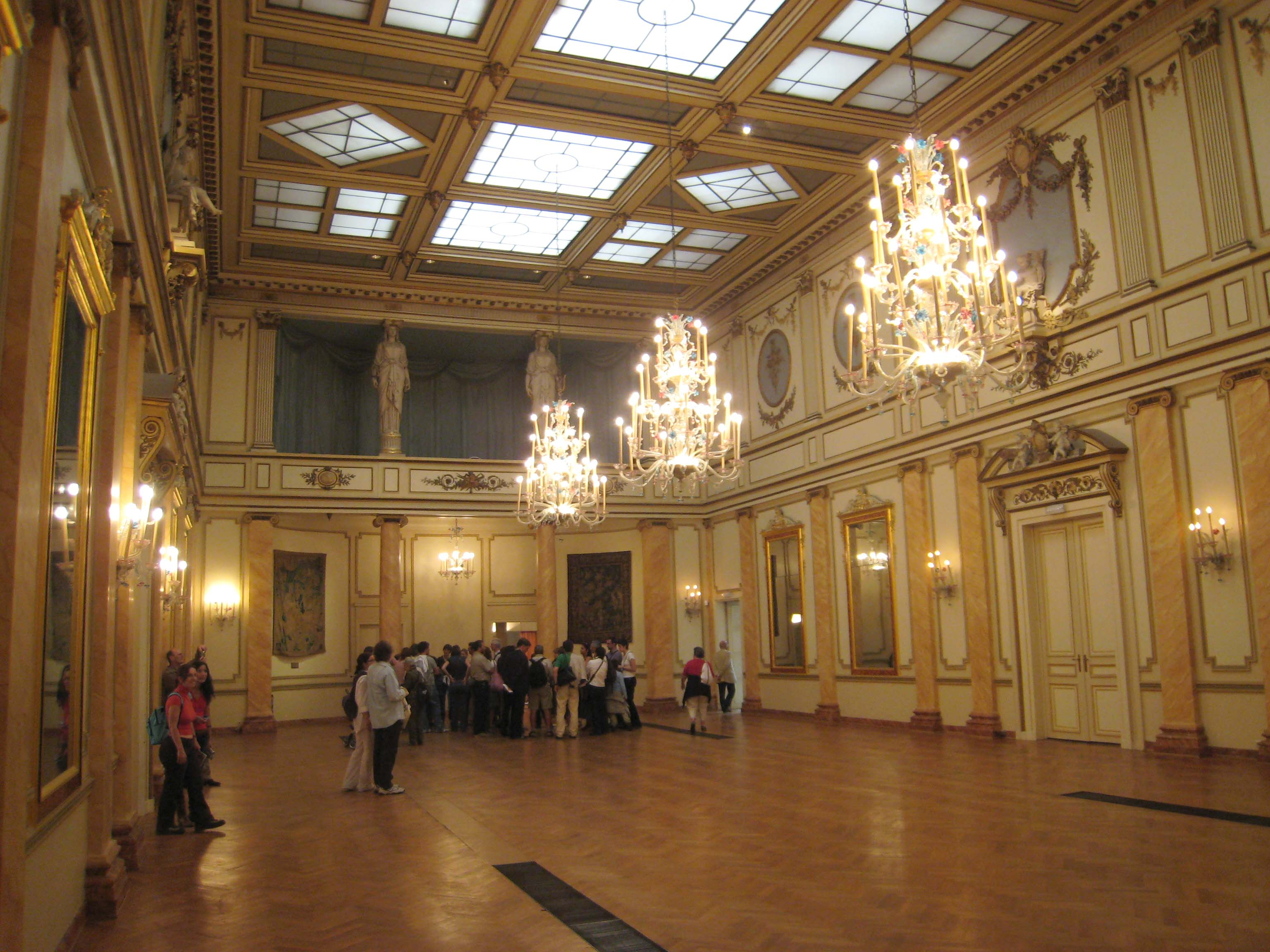
Salles des Cariatides

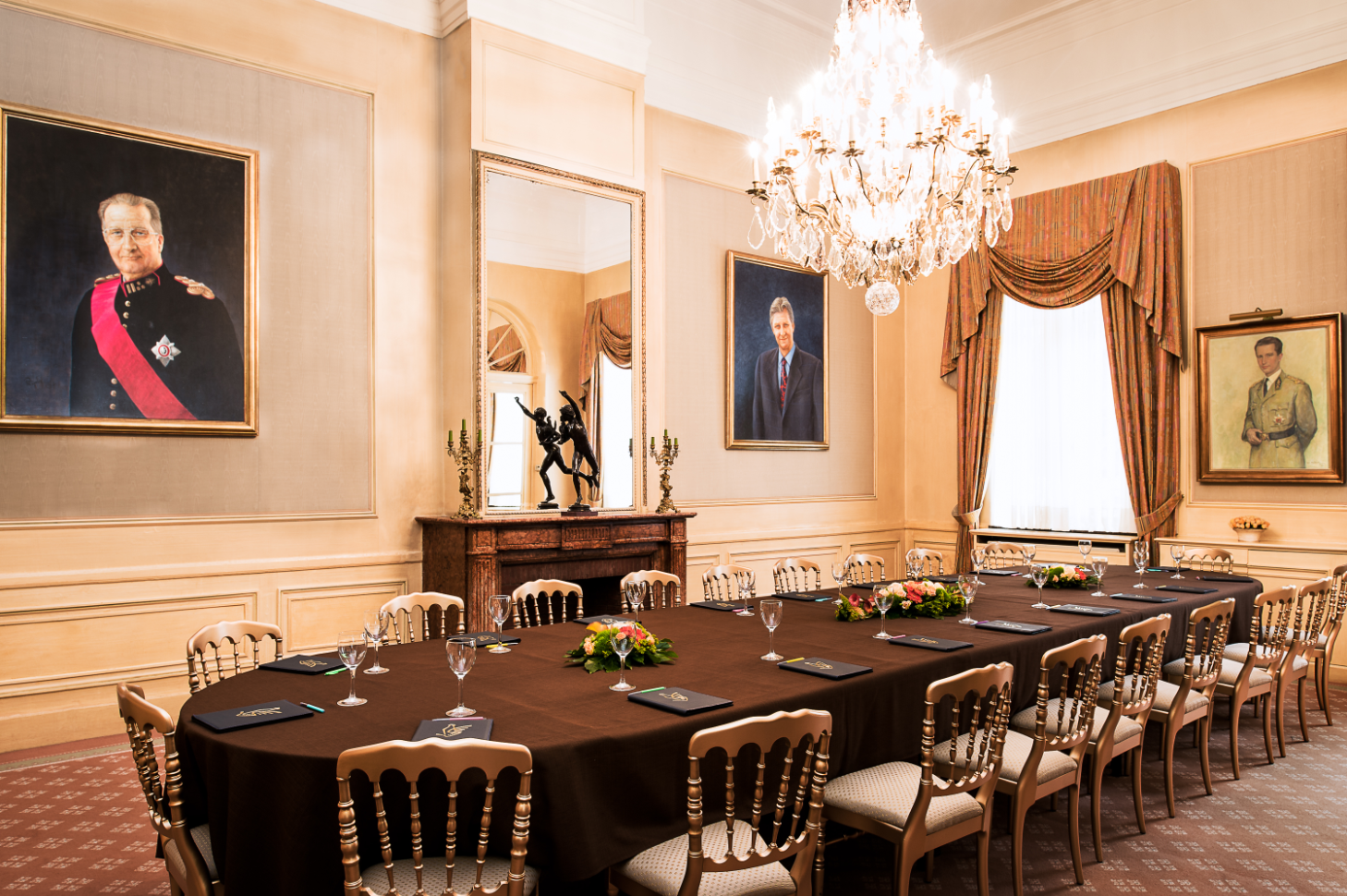
Salon royal

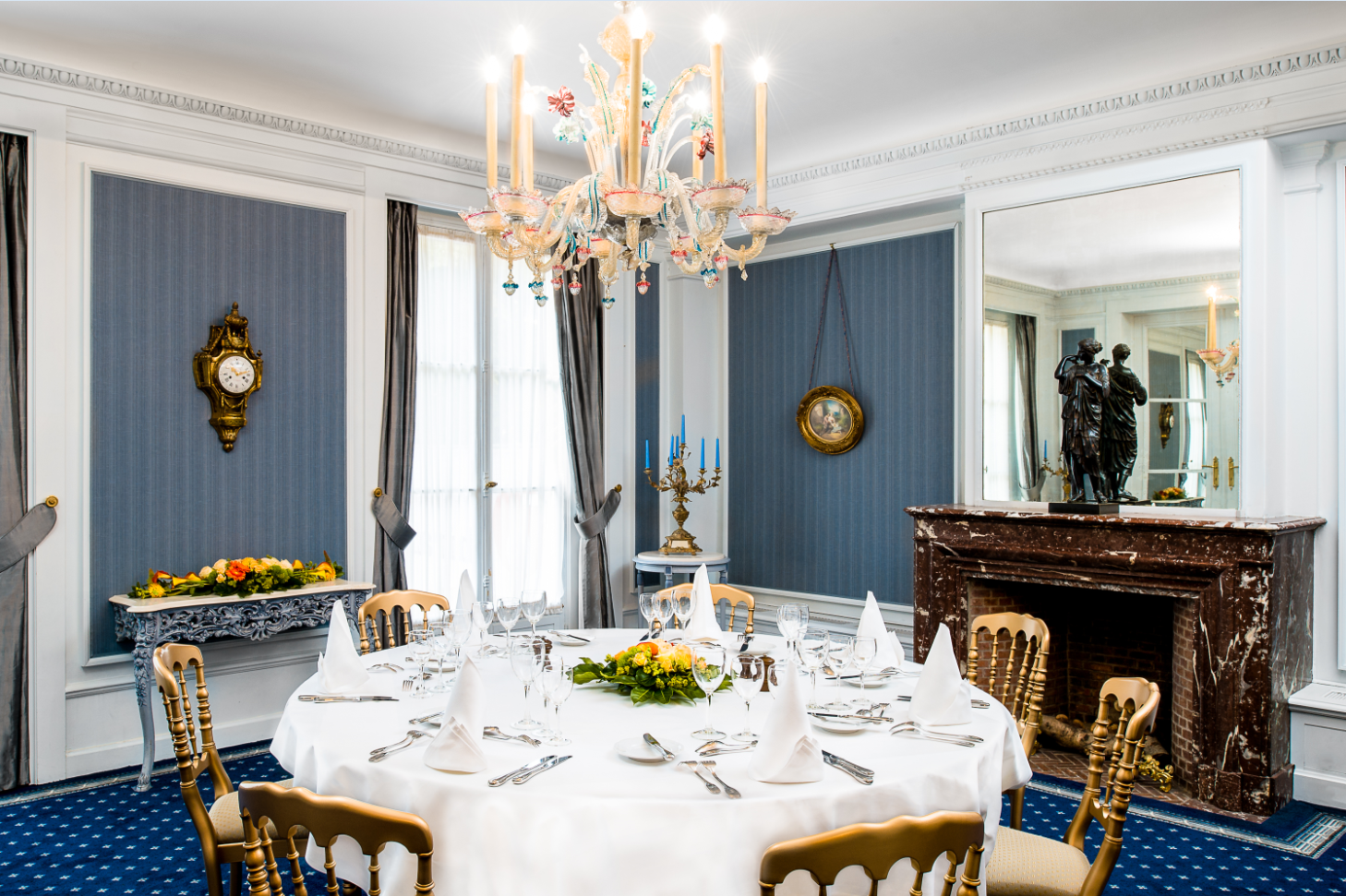
Salon bleu

== See also ==
- Cercle royal du Parc
- Cercle de Lorraine
- De Warande
- Federation of Belgian Enterprises
- Olivaint Conference of Belgium
- University Foundation

== Sources ==
- Remarks by Ambassador Korologos at the Cercle Royal Gaulois Luncheon Thursday, March 17, 2005
- Assemblée générale de la Société de la Légion d’Honneur - 15 novembre 2006
- Jan Puype, De elite van België - Welkom in de club, Van Halewyck
