= Emile Boulpaep =

Belgian physiologist (born 1938)

Emile Louis Boulpaep (born 15 September 1938) is a Belgian physiologist and since 1977 President of the Belgian American Educational Foundation. He is a member of the board of the Francqui Foundation.

== Education ==
He studied medicine at the Katholieke Universiteit Leuven (Leuven, Belgium), where he received a medical degree in 1962. In 1987 he obtained an honorary M.A. from Yale University in New Haven, Connecticut.

== Career ==
Emile Boulpaep is Professor and Director of Medical & Graduate Studies in Cellular & Molecular Physiology at Yale University. His research focuses on kidney tubule cells and cellular physiology.

In collaboration with Walter Boron, Boulpaep has written and published a textbook on medical physiology.

In 2020, he received the gold medal of the Royal Flemish Academy of Belgium for Science and the Arts for his work as the President of the Belgian American Educational Foundation.
