= Federal Public Planning Service Science Policy =

Federal government body

Logo of BELSPO

The Federal Public Planning Service Science Policy (Dutch: Programmatorische Federale Overheidsdienst Wetenschapsbeleid; French: Service public fédéral de programmation Politique scientifique; German: Föderaler Öffentlicher Programmierungsdienst Wissenschaftspolitik) or Belgian Science Policy Office, Federal Science Policy, known by the acronym BELSPO, is the federal government body responsible for research policy in Belgium. It designs and implements research programmes and networks and manages the participation of Belgium in European and international organisations. BELSPO supervises Belgian federal scientific organisations.

== History ==
Formal political and administrative coordination of the Belgian science policy was begun with the creation of the first government organisations in 1959. These included the Interministerial Commission for Science Policy (ICSP) and the National Council for Science Policy (NCSP). In 1968, the Science Policy Office (SPO) was established as a Belgian State administration.

BELSPO was previously known as the Office for Scientific, Technical and Cultural Affairs (OSTC), which name was changed following the Copernic reform of Belgium's federal administration.

== Federal scientific and cultural institutions ==
- Belgian Co-ordinated Collections of Micro-organisms
- Center for Historical Research and Documentation on War and Contemporary Society
- Geological Survey of Belgium
- National and Provincial State Archives (State Archives in Belgium)
- Planetarium
- Royal Belgian Institute of Natural Sciences
- Royal Belgian Institute for Space Aeronomy
- Royal Institute for Cultural Heritage
- Royal Library of Belgium
- Royal Meteorological Institute
- Royal Museum for Central Africa
- Royal Museums for Art and History
- Royal Museums of Fine Arts of Belgium
- Royal Observatory of Belgium

== Federal scientific and cultural partner institutions ==
- Academia Belgica in Rome
- Cinematek
- Euro Space Center
- Royal Academy of Overseas Sciences
- Von Karman Institute for Fluid Dynamics

== See also ==
- Agoria
- Belgian Academy Council of Applied Sciences (BACAS)
- Francqui Foundation
- National Fund for Scientific Research
- Science and technology in Belgium
- Science and technology in the Brussels-Capital Region
- Science and technology in Flanders
- Science and technology in Wallonia
