= Agency for Innovation by Science and Technology =

Flemish agency

The Agency for Innovation by Science and Technology was a Flemish agency between 1991 and 2015. It was an externally autonomized agency of the Flemish Government, in charge of innovation policy in Flanders and located in the Ellipse-Building in Brussels.

Paul Zeeuwts was president of the agency until his sudden death in 2009. From 2010 to 2015, the agency was headed by General Administrator Veerle Lories. The Board of Directors was chaired by Professor Dr. Paul Lagasse. The agency ca e under the jurisdiction of the Flemish Minister for Employment, Economy, Innovation and Sport Philippe Muyters.

On 1 January 2016, it merged into Flanders Innovation & Entrepreneurship (Agentschap Innoveren & Ondernemen).

== Mission ==
The agency's tasks were specified in a management agreement with the Flemish government, resulted in a yearly business plan, and were committed to:

- Stimulate innovation through financial support, advice and coordination;
- Stimulate knowledge development in companies, research institutes, government and other organizations;
- Encouraging the development of new products, processes, services and concepts with added economic and social value.

== Core tasks ==
Financial support: The Agency for Innovation by Science and Technology distributed about 300 million euros annually in subsidies. The grants went primarily to innovation studies, innovation and R&D projects submitted by small and medium-sized enterprises and large companies, universities, colleges and other Flemish innovative players; either individually or jointly. Part of the budget was distributed by the agency itself through its own support programs. For the remaining part, the agency acted as an intermediary: the preparation, monitoring and financial management was done by the agency in the name of the Flemish Government.

Consultancy: The Agency for Innovation by Science and Technology wanted innovation processes to happen as efficient and simple as possible. The agency consulted Flemish companies and R&D-centers in their innovation projects and funds applications.

Coordination and networking: The Agency for Innovation by Science and Technology also facilitated close cooperation between all players in the field of innovation in Flanders. The Flemish Innovation Network, for example, founded by the agency, brought together the knowledge and expertise of dozens of intermediary organizations.

Policy: The Agency for Innovation by Science and Technology played an important role in the preparation of policies aimed at boosting innovation in Flanders.

== See also ==
- Agoria
- BIPIB
- Flanders Interuniversity Institute of Biotechnology
- Flemish Council for Science Policy
- Flemish institute for technological research
- Fonds Wetenschappelijk Onderzoek
- GIMV
- Interuniversity Microelectronics Centre
- Lisbon Strategy
- Participatiemaatschappij Vlaanderen
- Science and technology in Flanders
- Technopolis
