= HZS =

HZS may refer to:

- Antwerp Maritime Academy (Dutch: Hogere Zeevaartschool Antwerpen)
- Henry Z. Steinway (1915–2008), American piano maker
- Honolulu Zoo Society
- Ice Hockey Federation of Slovenia (Slovene: Hokejska zveza Slovenije)
- Mountain Rescue Service (Slovakia) (Slovak: Horská záchranná služb)
- Hangzhou Spark Team in the Overwatch League
