= National Fund for Scientific Research =

Belgian scientific organization

The National Fund for Scientific Research (Dutch: Nationaal Fonds voor Wetenschappelijk Onderzoek (NFWO); French: Fonds National de la Recherche Scientifique (FNRS)) was once a government institution in Belgium for supporting scientific research until it was split into two separate organizations in 1992:

- the Dutch-speaking Fonds Wetenschappelijk Onderzoek – Vlaanderen (FWO) (Research Foundation – Flanders) for the Flemish Community
- the French-speaking Fonds de la Recherche Scientifique – FNRS (F.R.S.–FNRS) for the French Community

The task of the FWO and F.R.S.–FNRS is to stimulate the development of new knowledge in all scientific disciplines. The means to achieve this, is to finance excellent scientists and research projects after an inter-University competition and with an evaluation by foreign experts. The criterion for support is the scientific quality of the scientist and the research proposal, irrespective of scientific discipline.

Both institutions, the FWO and the F.R.S.–FNRS, are located in the same building at Egmontstraat 5 rue d'Egmont in B-1000 Brussels.

== History ==
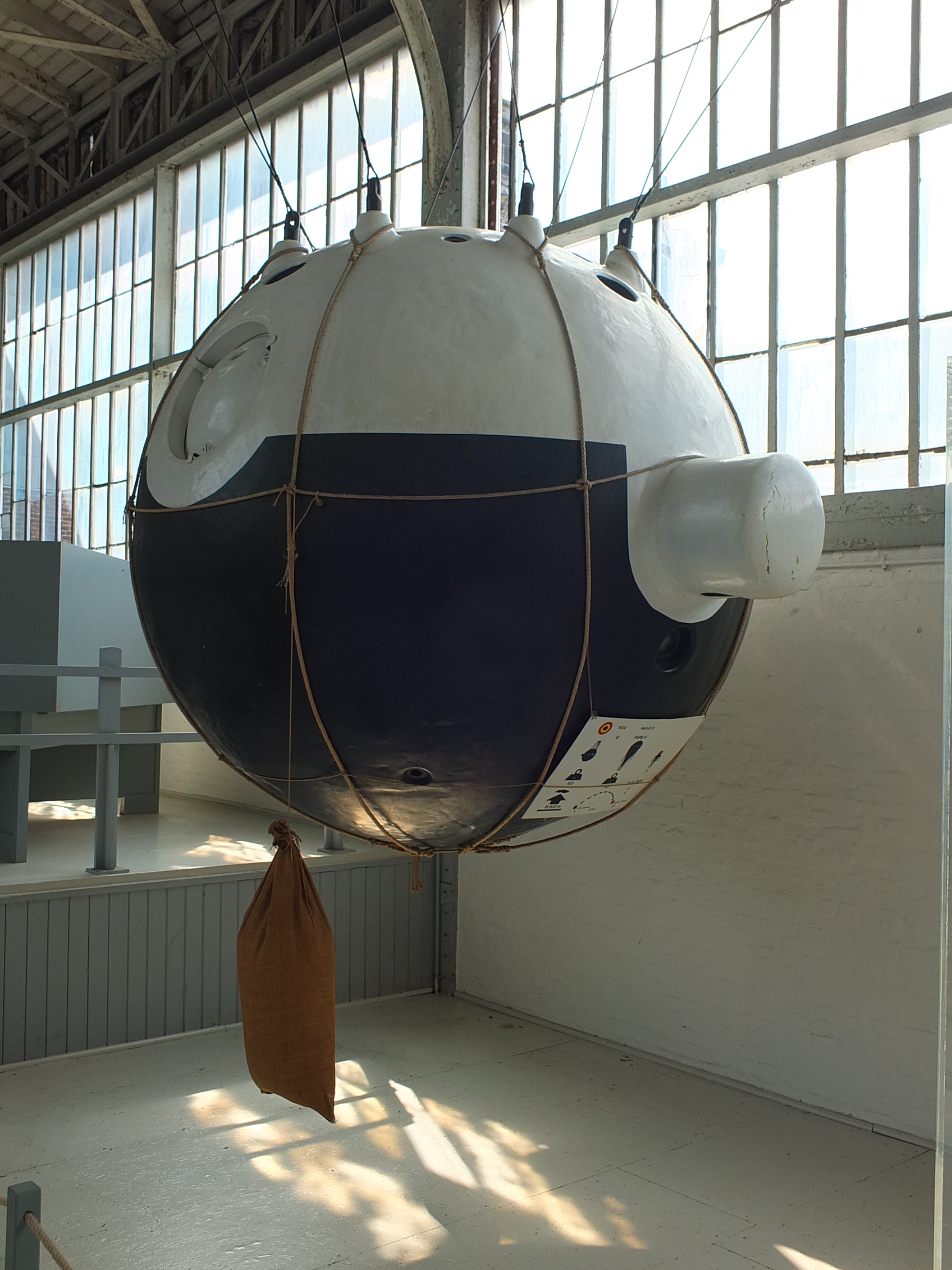
The RMM Piccard gondola.

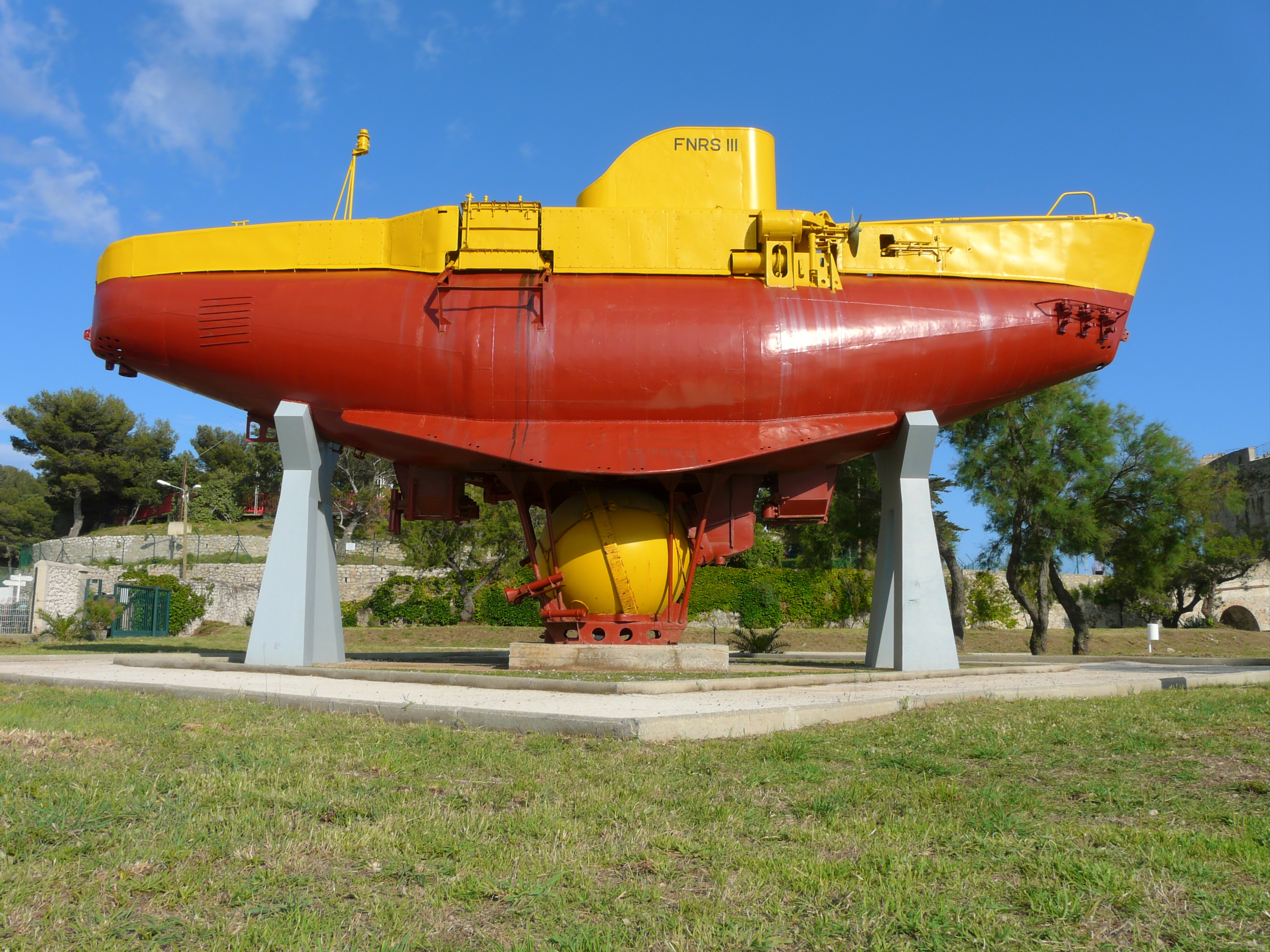
The FNRS III.

The National Fund for Scientific Research (NFSR) was founded on 2 June 1928 after a call by king Albert I of Belgium for more resources for scientific research. On 1 October 1927, in a speech at Cockerill in Seraing, King Albert I strongly emphasized the importance of scientific research to the economic development of Belgium. He repeated his appeal for more resources, on 26 November 1927, in a speech to the Academy. This led to the creation within the University Foundation of the National Fund for Scientific Research on 2 June 1928. The new institute was led by Emile Francqui.

Financial support initially came from the public, and from the Solvay family that gave 25 million Belgian francs. Financial contributions from the state were not needed until 1947. Today, part of the funding still comes from non-governmental sources, such as from RTL-TVI's charitable initiative Télévie.

The NFSR was the first Belgian organization to finance fundamental scientific research. Among the earliest projects funded were the stratosphere flights of professor Auguste Piccard. The FNRS-1 was a balloon that set a world altitude record. The NFSR also funded the FNRS-2, which was the first ever bathyscaphe built.

== Some early funded projects ==
- Archaeology
  - Series of excavations at Apamea in Syria (1930-)
  - Excavations on Easter Island in (1934–1935)
- Geography
  - Expedition to Rwenzori (1932)
- Physics
  - Stratospheric aerostat (1930) and bathyscaphe (1947) of Auguste Piccard
  - Participation at the Jungfraujoch observatory
  - An observatory for Earth's magnetic field at Manhay and Lubumbashi (1932)

== See also ==
- Belgian Federal Science Policy Office
- Science and technology in Belgium
- Science and technology in the Brussels-Capital Region
- Science and technology in Flanders
- Science and technology in Wallonia
- Belgian Interdisciplinary Platform for Industrial Biotechnology
- Institute for the promotion of Innovation by Science and Technology
- Belgian Academy Council of Applied Sciences
- Belgian Society of Biochemistry and Molecular Biology
- Belgian Physical Society
- Flanders Interuniversity Institute of Biotechnology
- Flemish Institute for Technological Research
- Francqui Foundation
- Francqui Prize
- InBev-Baillet Latour Fund
- Queen Elisabeth Medical Foundation
