= Katholieke Hogeschool Zuid-West-Vlaanderen =

Coordinates: 50°48′20.82″N 3°17′3.09″E

The Katholieke Hogeschool Zuid-West-Vlaanderen or KATHO was a university college in West Flanders. It had four campuses: Kortrijk, Roeselare, Tielt and Torhout. Since September 1, 2002, KATHO was a member of the K.U.Leuven Association. In 2013, KATHO merged with Katholieke Hogeschool Vives Noord (KHBO) and formed Hogeschool VIVES.

KATHO had seven departments

Kortrijk:

- HANTAL
- Ipsoc
- HIVV
- VHTI

Roeselare:

- HIVB

Tielt:

- PHO

Torhout:

- RENO

== See also ==
- Education in Belgium
