= Lessius Hogeschool =

Former university college in Belgium

Coordinates: 51.2070°N 4.4047°E

Lessius University College
- Lessius
- Lessius logo
- Type: university college
- Active: 2000–2012
- Academic affiliations: K.U.Leuven Association
- Location: Antwerp, Belgium
- Website: http://www.lessius.eu/

Lessius was a university college in Belgium named after the Jesuit economist Leonardus Lessius. It was founded in 2000 from the merger of two Catholic institutions of higher education in the city of Antwerp, and was later joined by another constituent college in Mechelen, which became the Lessius Mechelen campus. This gave Lessius several campuses in Antwerp and Mechelen. In 2012, Lessius merged with Katholieke Hogeschool Kempen to form Thomas More University college. This institute of higher education is a member of the K.U.Leuven Association.
