= Flemish Council for Science and Innovation =

The Flemish Council for Science and Innovation (Dutch: Vlaamse Raad voor Wetenschap en Innovatie, VRWI), previously known as the Flemish Council for Science Policy (Dutch: Vlaamse Raad voor Wetenschapsbeleid, VRWB) is the advisory body of the Flemish Government and the Flemish Parliament for science and technology policy. The VRWB provides advice concerning science and technology policy on its own initiative or on request. It provides recommendations, conducts investigations and provides its opinion on science and technology for Flanders. Dirk Boogmans is the Chairman of the Flemish Council for Science and Innovation. In 2016, it was abolished and reformed as the Flemish Advisory Council for Innovation and Entrepreneurialism (Dutch: Vlaamse Adviesraad voor Innoveren en Ondernemen).

== See also ==
- Belgian Academy Council of Applied Sciences
- Flemish Institute for Scientific and Technological Aspect research (viWTA)
- Flemish Institute for Technological Research (VITO)
- Institute for the promotion of Innovation by Science and Technology (IWT)
- National Fund for Scientific Research (FWO, FNRS)
- Royal Academies for Science and the Arts of Belgium
- Science and technology in Flanders
