= Belgian Academy Council of Applied Sciences =

BACAS Logo

The Royal Belgian Academy Council of Applied Sciences (BACAS) is a Belgian council, which consists of the Flemish Academy Committee for Science and Technology (CAWET) and Walloon Comité de l'Académie pour les Applications de la Science (CAPAS) committees of the Flemish and French Academies of Science in Belgium. BACAS has ten members from the academy and ten from industry. The council studies the impact of technological development on society and provides advice for the Belgian government and leaders of industry.

As of 2008 those two committees have become both two full classes of both academies, meaning that the members will become full members, nominated by the King of Belgium, of the academy. For the French-speaking Academy, CAPAS became the Class of Technology and Society, while CAWET became the Class of Technical Sciences.

== See also ==
- Academia Belgica
- Academia Europaea
- European Council of Applied Sciences and Engineering (Euro-CASE)
- Flemish Council for Science Policy
- Francqui Foundation
- National Fund for Scientific Research
- Science and technology in Belgium
- Science and technology in Flanders
- Science and technology in the Brussels-Capital Region
- Science and technology in Wallonia
