= Derrick Gosselin =

Belgian engineer, economist, and professor

Derrick-Philippe Gosselin

10th Chairman Belgian Nuclear Research Centre SCK CEN (Est. 1952)
- Incumbent
- Assumed office 3 December 2013

Personal details
- Born: 12 September 1956 (age 70) Belgium
- Education: Ghent University; University of Oxford; INSEAD

Derrick-Philippe, Baron Gosselin (born 1956) is a Belgian engineer and economist. He is chairman of the Belgian Nuclear Sciences Research Centre SCK CEN and vice-chairman of the Royal Higher Institute for Defence (RHID). He is on the board of the Von Karman Institute.

== Education ==
Gosselin holds degrees in engineering, economics and business administration at Ghent University. He is an alumnus of the High Studies in Security and Defence at the Royal Higher Institute for Defence (RHID) of the Royal Military Academy (Belgium) and graduated from the European Security and Defence College in advanced strategy. He further undertook postgraduate education at Vlerick Business School, University of Oxford (Green Templeton College) and INSEAD.

== Academic career ==
Gosselin is an associate fellow of Green Templeton College, University of Oxford. He is a member of the Energy Steering Panel of the European Academies' Science Advisory Council (EASAC). He is since 2021 professor emeritus at the School of Economics (Faculty of Economics and Business Administration) Ghent University.

Gosselin is chairman of SCK CEN and vice-chairman of the board of governors of the Royal Higher Institute for Defence (RHID). He is on the board of trustees and former vice-chairman of the von Karman Institute for Fluid Dynamics.

He is an elected fellow of the Royal Flemish Academy of Belgium for Science and the Arts (KVAB), the Royal Academy for Overseas Sciences (RAOS) and Academia Europaea. Furthermore, he is a member of the French National Air and Space Academy (Académie de l'air et de l'espace (AAE)) and the Royal Aeronautical Society (RAeS).

He was a member of the Global Future Councils of the World Economic Forum (2007-2015) and was a board member of the European Council of Applied Sciences and Engineering (Euro-CASE) (2008–2011). He is the founder and former president of Flanders Business School (1999–2004). His research focuses on decision-making in highly complex and uncertain situations (Wicked problems, Futures Studies and Complexity theory).

He is the honorary chairman (Senior Member) of the Oxford University Belgo-Luxembourgish Society OUBLS, Honorary associate fellow of the Oxford Martin School (2007–2022) at the University of Oxford, and an honorary fellow of High Hill College (Hogenheuvel College) (2007–2009) at the Katholieke Universiteit Leuven.

== Government career ==
He is honorary chief of staff (2009–2012) to the Prime Minister of the Flemish government. Author and architect of the New Industrial Policy for Flanders including the setup of an Industrial Transformations Fund (PMV-TINA). He was also a government commissioner for the Agency for Innovation by Science and Technology of Flanders (IWT). At the beginning of his career, he worked as an attaché in the Department for Science Policy Planning, now BELSPO, in the Office of the Belgian Prime Minister.

== Business career ==
Together with Julien De Wilde and John J. Goossens, Gosselin joined the Alcatel-Alsthom group in 1990 as a member of the executive committee. From 2002 to 2009 he was executive vice president of the international energy branch of Suez, now Engie group. He started his business career at Arthur Andersen & Co.

== Sources ==
- De Standaard 26 November 2008 - Klassieke managers kunnen crisis niet aan
- "Eyes Wide Open: Embracing Uncertainty through Scenario Planning". Knowledge at Wharton. 22 July 2009.
