= Science and technology in Wallonia =

Science and technology in Wallonia, the southern region of Belgium (Europe), is well developed with the presence of several universities and research institutes.

== Universities in Wallonia ==
Universities in Wallonia are part of the universities of the French Community.

- Université de Namur (UNamur), Namur
- Université catholique de Louvain (UCLouvain), Louvain-la-Neuve
- Université de Liège (ULiège), Liège
- Université de Mons (UMons), Mons

According to the Academic Ranking of World Universities, the University of Louvain (UCLouvain) is among the top 200 universities worldwide.

According to the Webometrics Ranking of World Universities, the University of Liège is among the top 200 universities in Europe and top 400 universities worldwide.

== Technology institutes ==
Wallonia is home to several science and technology organizations.

- ARESA - clinical research cluster
- Automotive Cluster of Wallonia
- Ceramic products cluster
- Eco-building cluster
- Fonds National de la Recherche Scientifique (FNRS)
- Francqui Foundation
- ICT cluster
- Nutrition cluster
- Solid Wastes cluster
- Transport & Logistics Cluster
- Walloon Aeronautical Cluster (EWA)
- Walloon Space Cluster

== Science parks ==
Several science parks associated with the universities are spread over Wallonia.

- Science Parks of Wallonia
- Louvain-la-Neuve Science Park
- Liège Science Park
- Crealys Science Park
- Aéropole Science Park
- Initialis Science Park
- Qualitis Science Park

== See also ==
- Science and technology in Belgium
- Science and technology in the Brussels-Capital Region
- Science and technology in Flanders
- Belgian Federal Science Policy Office (BELSPO)
- Economy of Belgium
- Sillon industriel
- Agoria
