= Cercle royal du Parc =

Gentlemen's club in Brussels, Belgium

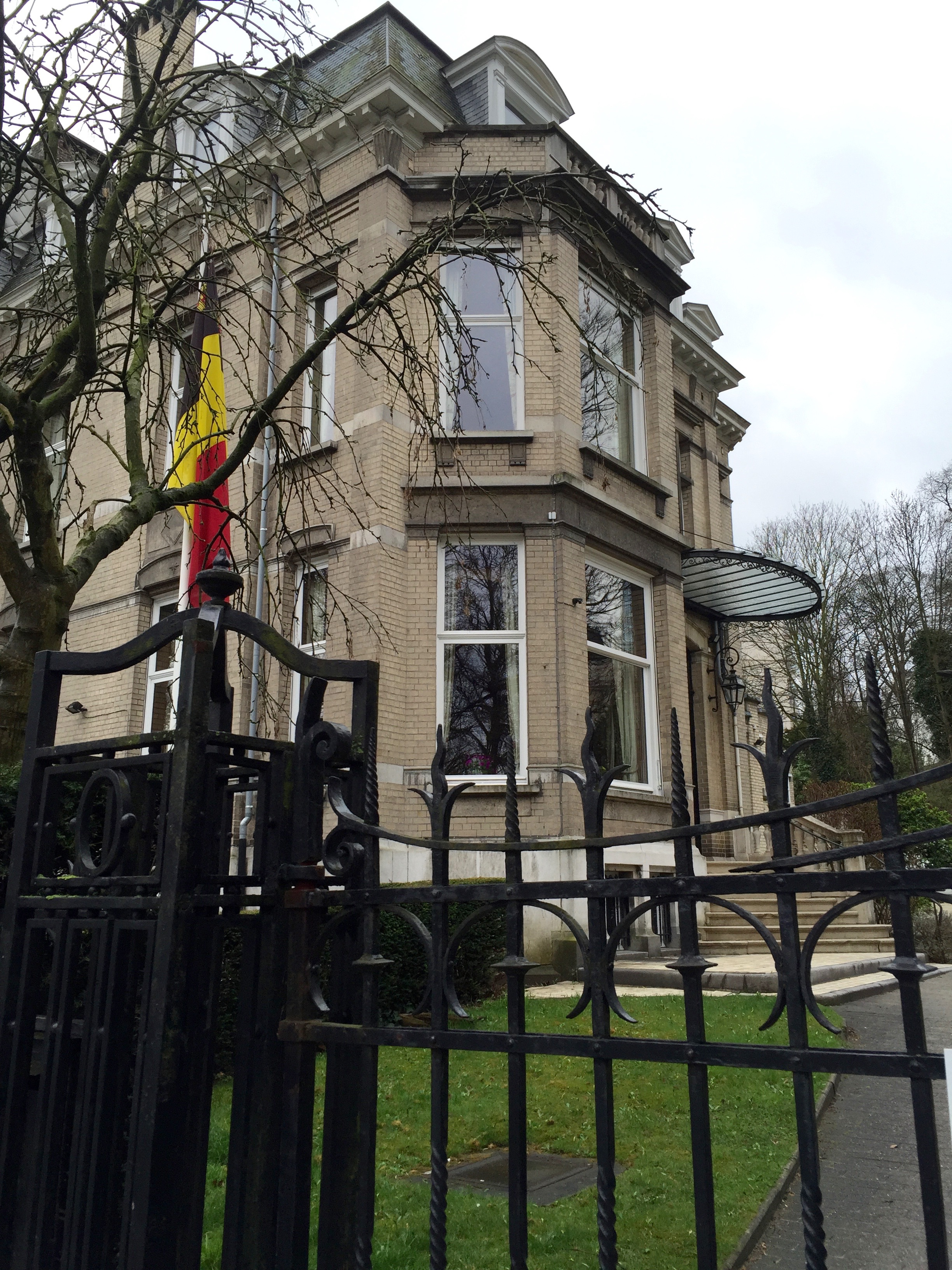
- Founded: 1842; 184 years ago
- Type: Private members club

The Cercle royal du Parc (lit. 'Royal Park Circle') is a Belgian gentlemen's club, located in Ixelles, a municipality of Brussels, with most members originating from nobility.

== History ==
The Cercle royal du Parc ("Royal Park Circle") was founded in 1842 when a group of Belgicist noblemen left the Orangist Cercle de l'Union ("Union Circle").

== Notable members ==
- Baron (Marc-Antoine) de Schoutheete de Tervarent (Président)
- Baron (Jean-Pierre) de Chestret de Haneffe (Secrétaire Général)
- Baron Gaétan van der Bruggen (Trésorier)

== Members ==
- List of members

== See also ==
- Cercle de Lorraine
- Cercle royal Gaulois artistique et littéraire
- De Warande

== Sources ==
- Puype, Jan (2004). De elite van België (in Dutch). Leuven: Van Halewyck. ISBN 90-5617-507-6.
- Cercle royal du Parc
