= Walter Boron =

American academic

Walter F. Boron
- Born: November 18, 1949; Elyria, Ohio, United States of America
- Education: Saint Louis University, Washington University in St. Louis
- Scientific career
- Workplaces: Case Western Reserve University
- Academic advisors: Emile L. Boulpaep, Albert Roos

Walter F. Boron (born November 18, 1949) is an American scientist and the 72nd president of the American Physiological Society (from 1999 to 2000). He was Secretary-General of the International Union of Physiological Sciences. Additionally, Boron is co-editor, along with Emile L. Boulpaep, of the textbook Medical Physiology and Concise Medical Physiology. He is a former editor-in-chief of two leading physiology journals, Physiological Reviews and Physiology.

== Education ==
Boron obtained his AB degree in chemistry, summa cum laude from Saint Louis University in 1971. He then joined the Medical Scientist Training Program at Washington University School of Medicine, where he received his M.D. and Ph.D. degrees in 1977 under the mentorship of Albert Roos. During this time, Boron also collaborated with Paul De Weer and John M. Russell . Boron joined Yale University as a postdoctoral fellow with Emile L. Boulpaep in the Department of Physiology, from 1978 to 1980.

== Career ==
Boron is the David N. and Inez Myers/Antonio Scarpa Professor and Chair of the Department of Physiology and Biophysics at Case Western Reserve University. He is also Professor of Medicine and Professor of Biochemistry. Since 2016, he has been Executive Director of PhD programs at the School of Medicine. He briefly served as Interim Chair of the Department of Biochemistry (from 2017 to 2018). Previously, he was a member of the faculty of Yale University (from 1989-2007), serving three 3-year terms as Chair of the Department of Cellular and Moleculary Physiology from 1989 through 1998.

Boron's lifelong research interest has been pH (acid-base) homeostasis. With his colleagues, he was the first to demonstrate cell-pH regulation, developed the first mathematical model of cell-pH regulation, discovered several sodium-coupled/bicarbonate cotransporters (the NBCs), was the first to clone the DNA encoding an NBC, discovered the sensing of molecular carbon dioxide and bicarbonate, and introduced several paradigms for studying cellular acid-base physiology. His laboratory has elucidated the mechanisms and control of acid-base transport in kidney tubules, and pH regulation in neurons and glial cells from the central nervous system. discovered and cloned several bicarbonate transporters, elucidated the sensing of molecular carbon dioxide and bicarbonate, and introduced several experimental paradigms for studying cellular acid-base physiology.

While studying pH regulation in cells from the stomach, Boron and his colleagues became the first to describe a membrane that does not permit the penetration of carbon dioxide. This result led to the discovery of the first gas channel (a protein channel in a cell membrane that is permeable to a gas), namely aquaporin-1. Boron's group has extended its interest to understanding mechanisms of gas movement through aquaporins, Rh proteins, and other membrane proteins, and the physiological significance of these movements.

== Professional awards ==
Boron was a Searle Scholar from 1981 to 1984. He received the Homer Smith Award from the American Society of Nephrology in 2005, the Sharpey-Schafer Award from The Physiological Society (London) in 2008, and the Palade Gold Medal (shared with William Catterall and Richard Tsien) from Wayne State University in 2010. In 2014, Boron received an honorary doctorate from Aarhus University in Denmark, and was elected to the National Academy of Medicine. He was appointed Distinguished University Professor at Western Reserve University in 2020.

== Entrepreneurship ==
Boron and Marc Pelletier co-founded Aeromics Corporation, which discovered the first high-affinity blocker of an aquaporin water blocker. This drug, which has now passed Phase 1 clinical trials, greatly slows the movement of water into the brain (cerebral edema) in models of stroke in mice and rats, and greatly improves clinical outcome. In addition, Boron, George Farr, and Paul Schlather founded Remsenwood Associates, an umbrella company that has created JanusQ, LLC.

== Books ==
- Medical Physiology Walter F. Boron. 1st Edition (2002)
- Medical Physiology Walter F. Boron, Emile L. Boulpaep. 2nd Edition (2008)
- Medical Physiology Walter F. Boron, Emile L. Boulpaep. 3rd Edition (2016)
