= De Warande (club) =

Flemish private club in Brussels

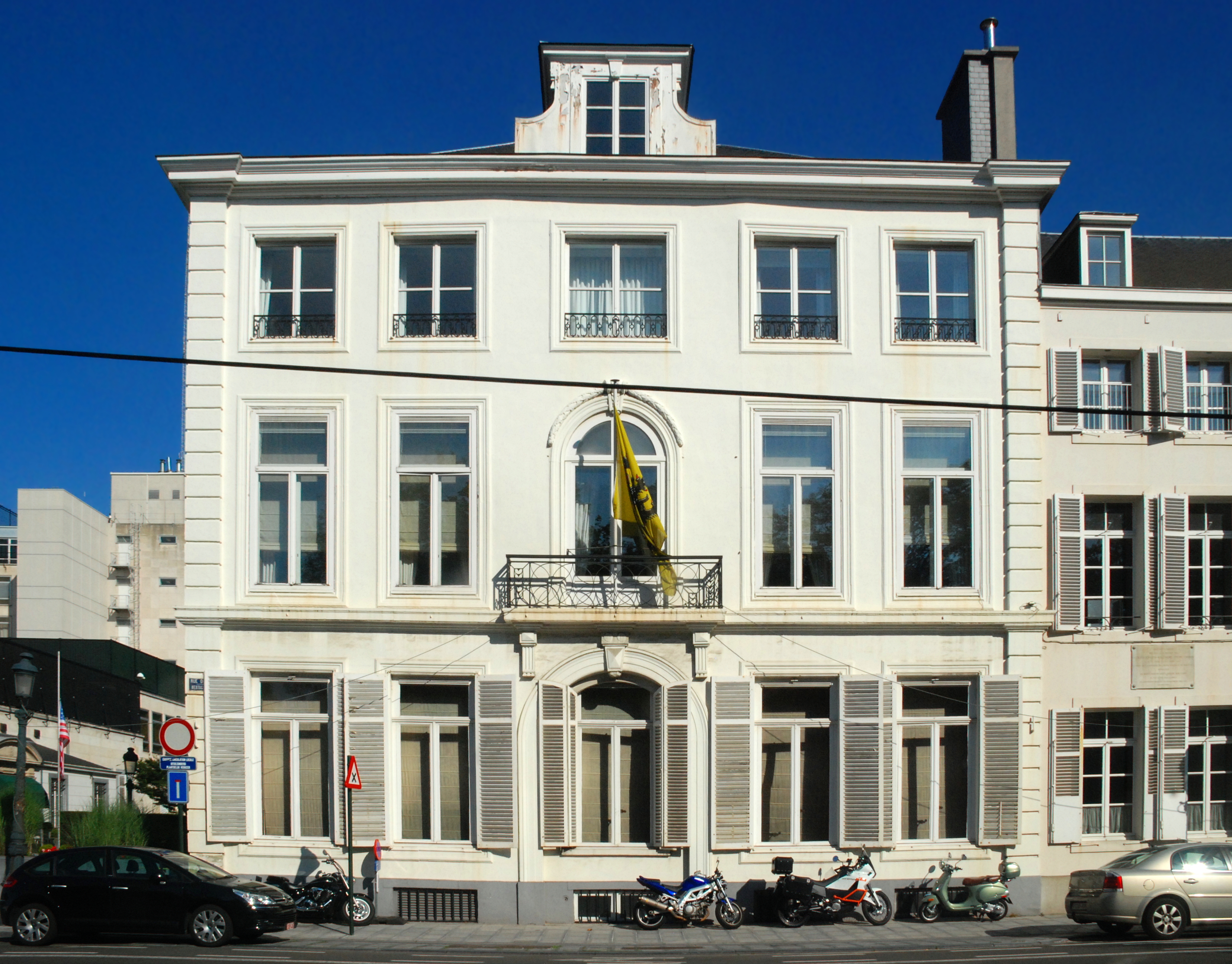
- Hôtel Empain, in which De Warande is located.
- Named after: Brussels Park
- Formation: December 6, 1986; 39 years ago
- Type: Private members club
- Headquarters: City of Brussels, Belgium
- Location: 1 Rue Zinner/Zinnerstraat, City of Brussels, Brussels, Belgium
- Official language: Dutch
- Website: https://www.dewarande.be/

De Warande is a Flemish club, located in Brussels, Belgium. The club was founded in Brussels in 1988.

When founded in 1988, then club received an interest-free loan of €750,000 from Flanders to renovate its building at Brussels Park (Dutch: Warandepark). In 2018, the Flemish Government granted the business club a 20-year interest-free loan of €800,000, to "strengthen the Flemish presence in Brussels and promote the international [...] Flanders." Both loans are reimbursed by memberships for 50 or 60 Flemish ministers, heads of cabinet and top civil servants, equivalent to €800 per year, per membership.

== See also ==
- Cercle de Lorraine
- Cercle royal Gaulois artistique et littéraire
- Orde van den Prince
- Agoria
- Federation of Belgian Enterprises
- VOKA
- Olivaint Conference of Belgium
- University Foundation

== Sources ==
- De Warande
- Jan Puype, De elite van België - Welkom in de club, Van Halewyck
