= Geological Survey of Belgium =

National geological agency

The Geological Survey of Belgium (GSB, French: Service géologique de Belgique) is a Belgian federal research institute for Belgian geology. It is a department of the Royal Belgian Institute of Natural Sciences. The institute is as a resource centre and project partner which produces maps, books and databases of Belgian geology. The GSB is a member of the European Geological Surveys network.

== History ==
The institute was founded in 1896 and includes a Documentation Center for Earth Sciences on geological and hydrogeological data and a Research and Development department.

== See also ==
- BELSPO
- Geographical Information System (GIS)
- International Union of Geological Sciences
