= Flanders Institute for Logistics =

Belgian enterprise

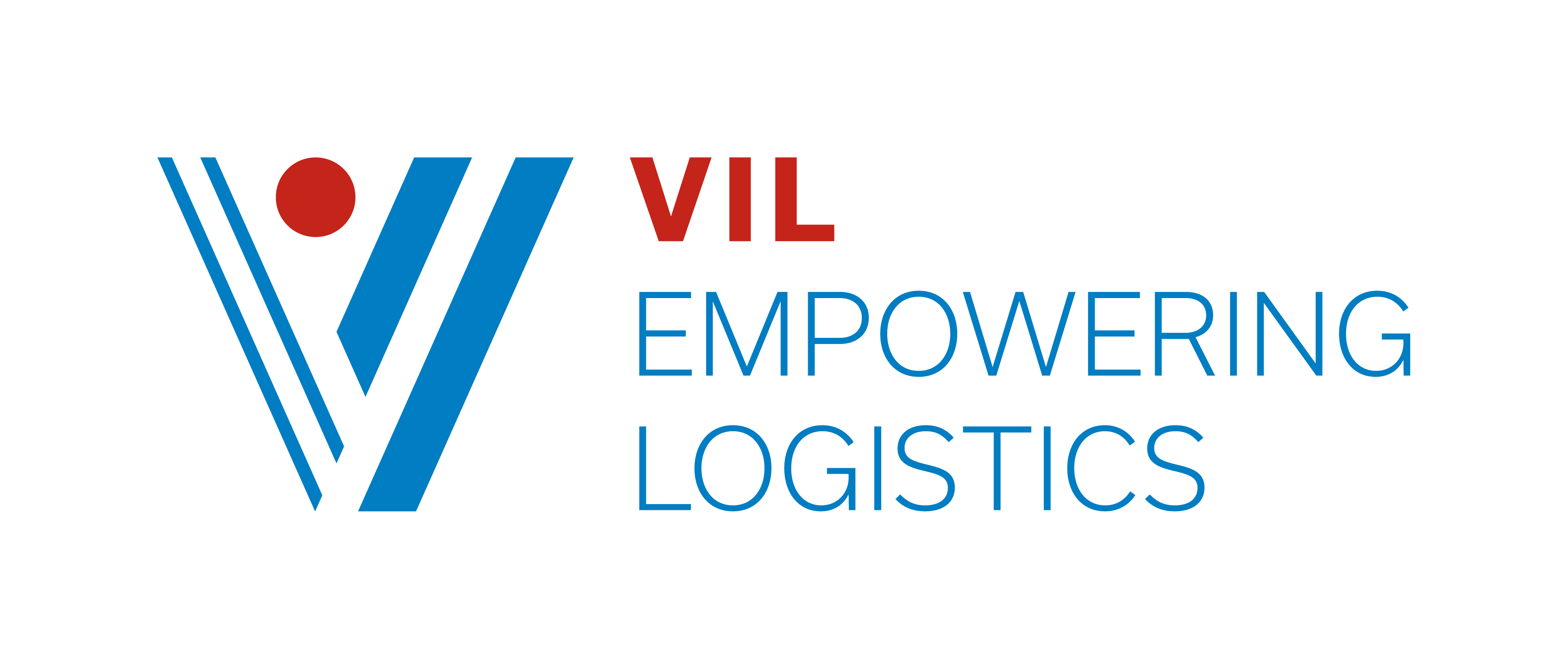
Flanders Institute for Logistics, logo, 2017

The Flanders Institute for Logistics (Dutch: Vlaams Instituut voor de Logistiek; VIL) is a Flemish non-profit organization, founded in 2003 by the Flemish government. The VIL supports and enhances the competitiveness of the logistics sector in Flanders.

== See also ==
- Agoria
- Walloon Transport & Logistics Cluster
- Brussels Airport
- Enterprise resource planning (ERP)
- Logistic engineering
- Port of Antwerp
- Supply chain management
- Transport in Belgium
- Institute of Transport and Maritime Management Antwerp
- Science and technology in Flanders
