= Academia Belgica =

Italian-based Belgian cultural institution

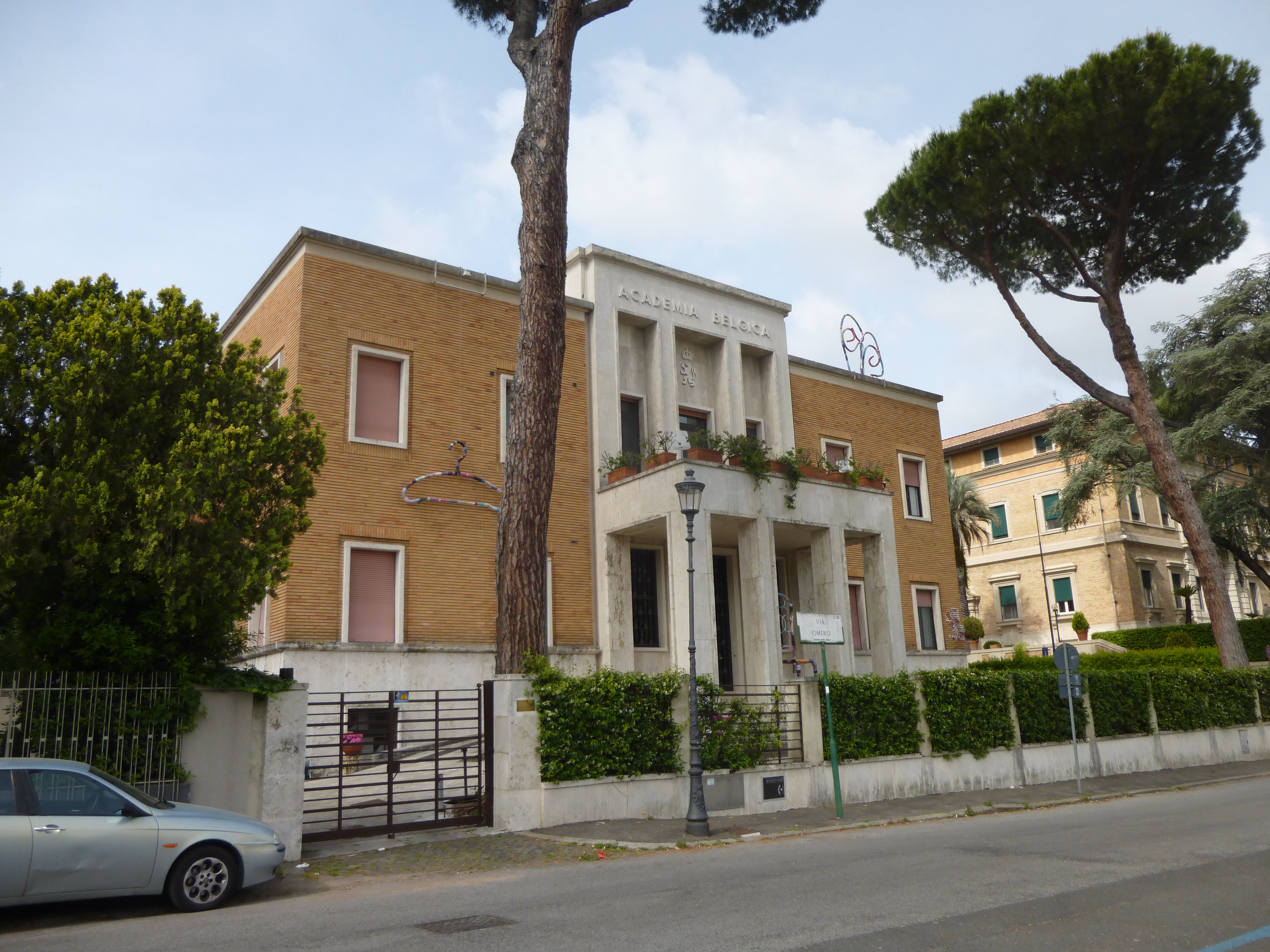
Façade of the Academia Belgica

The Academia Belgica is an academic organization headquartered in Rome, Italy. The goal of the Academy is to promote the cultural, scientific and artistic cooperation between Italy and Belgium.

The organization was founded in 1939 when the Belgian princess Marie-José married the Italian crown prince Umberto. The Academy is also the seat of the Belgian Historical Institute in Rome and of the foundation princess Marie-José, which supports historical research.

In 1947, Franz Cumont donated his library to the Academia Belgica. Pierre Bautier and Henri Pirenne, also donated collections to the academy.

== Directors of the Academy ==
- Jules Vannerus (1939–1940)
- Fernand De Visscher (1945–1949)
- Fernand Vercauteren (1949–1954)
- William Lameere (1954–1959)
- Charles Verlinden (1959–1977)
- Jan Arthur van Houtte (1977–1983)
- Louis Godart (1983–1988)
- Jozef Mertens (1988–1993)
- Jacqueline Hamesse (1993–2003)
- Walter Geerts (2003–2012)
- Wouter Bracke (2012-2018)
- Sabine Van Sprang (since 2018)

== See also ==
- Academia Europaea
- Belgian Federal Science Policy Office (BELSPO)
- National Fund for Scientific Research
- Royal Library of Belgium
- Science and technology in Belgium
- The Royal Academies for Science and the Arts of Belgium
- University Foundation
