= Institute of Transport and Maritime Management Antwerp =

ITMMA (Institute of Transport and Maritime Management Antwerp) was a highly successful and world-leading interfaculty institute of University of Antwerp offering master programs, a PhD program, a postgraduate program, short-term courses, events and conferences and research and consultancy in the area of shipping and ports. ITMMA was founded in 1996 as the first inter-university institute of the then confederal University of Antwerp (consisting of RUCA, UIA and UFSIA). Prof. Willy Winkelmans was one of its founding fathers and acted as ITMMA President between 1996 and 2006. Prof. Theo Notteboom was ITMMA President between 2006 and 2014.

As a highly international institute, about one thousand students from about 75 nations worldwide obtained a master's degree at ITMMA. The institute organized and co-organized leading events and conferences such as the ITMMAPS conferences in 2002 and 2006, the ICLSP conferences in 2004 and 2008, the Ports in Proximity conference in 2007, the Asian Logistics Round Table conference in 2010 and the IAME Annual conference held in Santiago (Chile) in 2011.

Dozens of academic papers were published by former ITMMA research team members such as Wout Dullaert (operations research), Wouter Jacobs (economic geography), Frank Witlox (transport geography), Theo Notteboom (maritime economics and geography) and dozens of researchers and PhD students. ITMMA authored five key reports for the European Seaports Organisation (ESPO) and many more reports for public and private entities. ITMMA was involved in numerous EC projects related to the maritime sector (cf. PPRISM, SPIN, Know-Me, PORTOPIA, etc..). ITMMA staff gave presentations at or moderated over 500 academic and business conferences in the maritime field.

The activities under the brand name ITMMA were discontinued in 2015 following a decision of the University of Antwerp. The newly reconstituted center is known as Centre for Maritime and Air Transport Management (C-MAT) with new programs.

== See also ==
- Port of Antwerp
- Transport in Belgium
- Flanders Institute for Logistics
- Walloon Transport & Logistics Cluster
