= Hogeschool VIVES =

University in West Flanders, Belgium

VIVES University of Applied Sciences
- Hogeschool VIVES
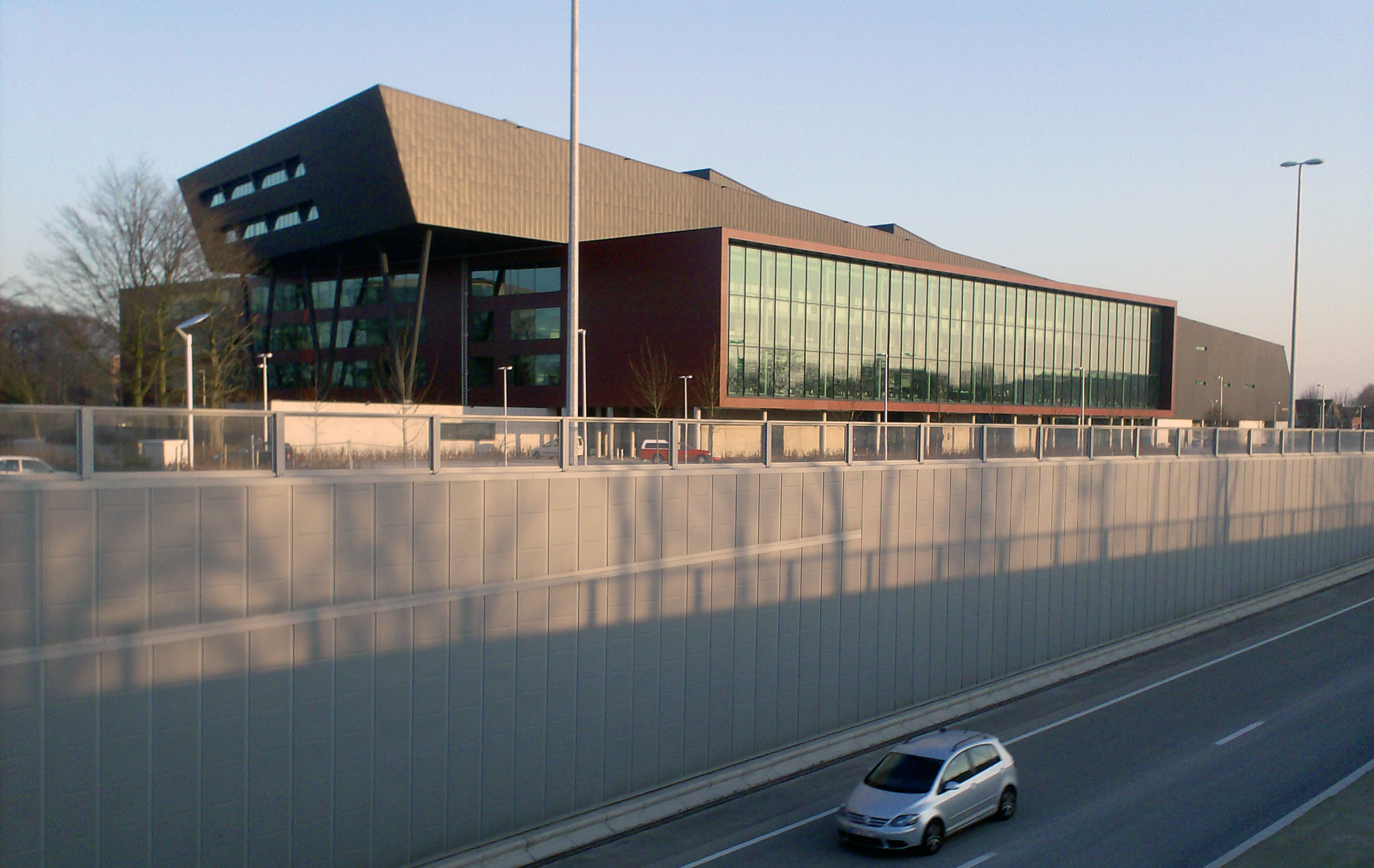
- VIVES Bruges campus Xaverianenstraat
- Type: University college
- Established: 2013
- Affiliations: K.U.Leuven Association
- Administrative staff: ± 1,400 FTE
- Students: ± 20,000
- Location: West Flanders, Belgium
- Campus: Urban
- Nickname: VIVES
- Website: www.vives.be
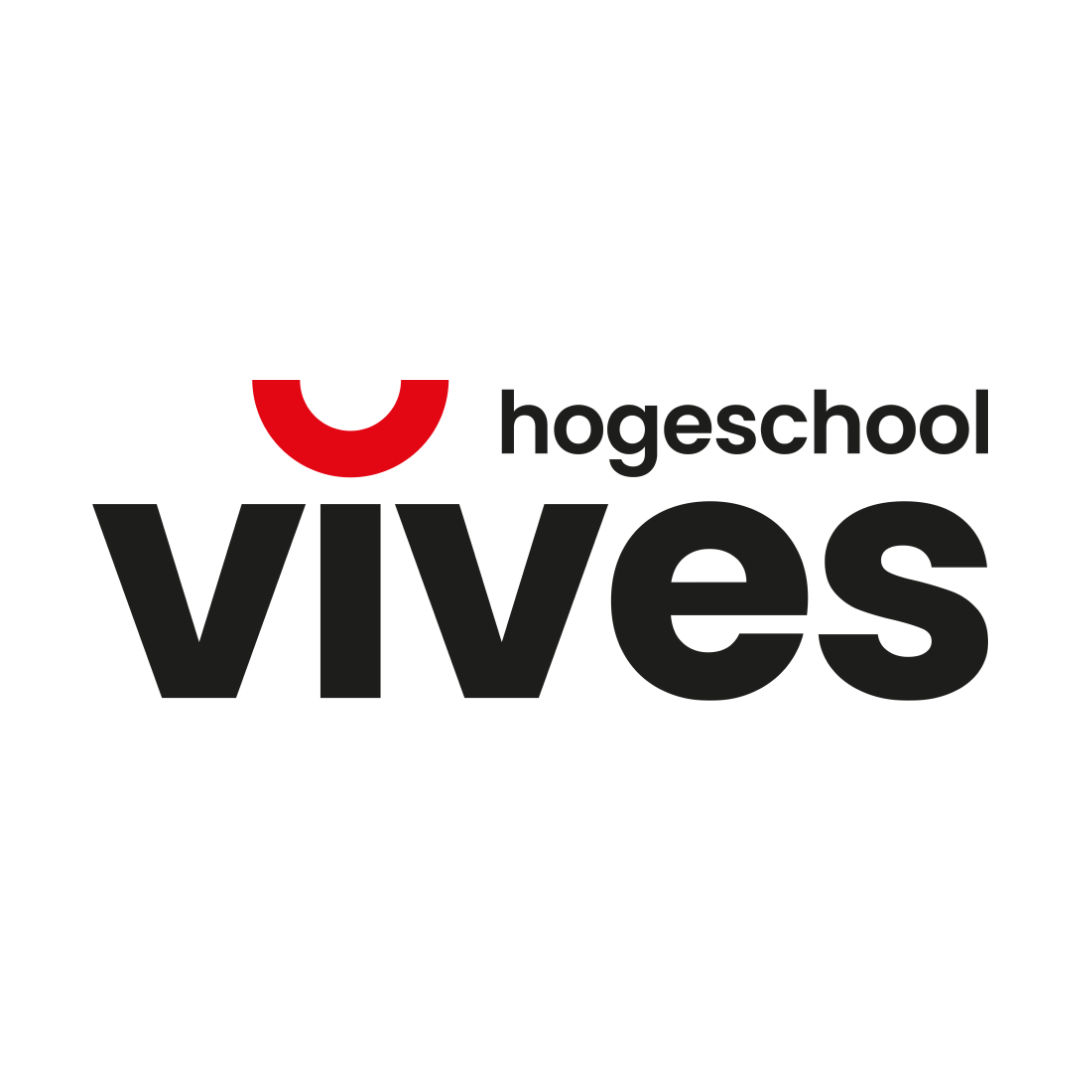

VIVES University of Applied Sciences is a University College located in West Flanders, Belgium. The name refers to the Spanish-Brussian humanist Juan Luis Vives. VIVES was created in 2013 through the merger of KATHO and KHBO.

== Founding ==
VIVES University of Applied Sciences was created by the merger of the Katholieke Hogeschool Zuid-West-Vlaanderen and the Katholieke Hogeschool Brugge-Oostende. KATHO and KHBO signed a declaration of intent for cooperation on 23 June 2010. The fusion and the name were announced on 21 December 2012 and became effective in September 2013. At the same time, the university courses were split off into Katholieke Universiteit Leuven Campus Brugge, a new department of KU Leuven.

With over 20,000 students, VIVES is one of the largest university colleges in Flanders.

== Campuses ==
=== VIVES South ===
- Kortrijk (HQ)
- Roeselare
- Torhout

=== VIVES North ===
- Bruges (campus Xaverianenstraat and campus Bruges Station)
- Ostend (campus Ostend Station and campus VLOC)
