= Technopolis (Belgium) =

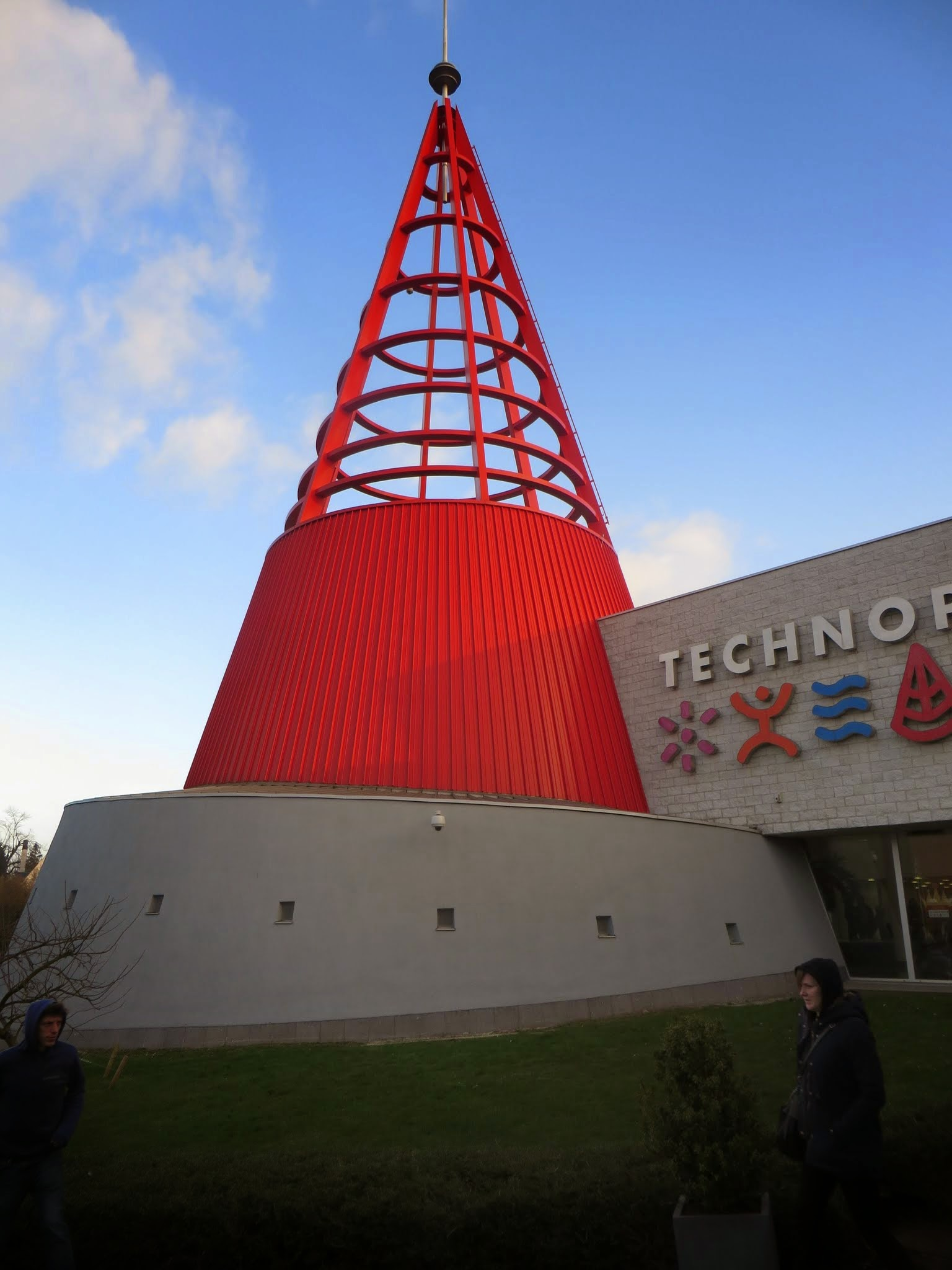
Technopolis

Technopolis is a Flemish technology education centre located in Mechelen.

== Flanders Technology International ==
Technopolis is an initiative which grew out of the Flanders Technology International (FTI) Foundation, which was an initiative of the Flemish government. Since 7 October 1999, the FTI offices are located within the premises of the Technopolis centre and the name of the organization was changed to Technopolis. The goal of the organization is to stimulate biotechnology and micro-electronics, and to increase the visibility of science in Flanders.

== Exhibition ==
The Technopolis science museum was opened on 26 February 2000. It has a permanent interactive (hands-on) exhibition for science and technology on display.

== See also ==
- Science and technology in Flanders
- Agoria, technology industry in Belgium.
- Institute for the promotion of Innovation by Science and Technology (IWT)
- Interuniversity Microelectronics Centre (IMEC)
- Deutsches Museum
- Euro Space Center
- Evoluon
- Scienceworks Museum
- Telus Spark
