= Paul Zeeuwts =

Paul Zeeuwts (b. Anderlecht 9 May 1948, d. Brussels 17 March 2009) was President of the Flemish Institute for the promotion of Innovation by Science and Technology from 1991 until his death in 2009. He was Chief of staff for the Belgian science policy from May 1988 until July 1991.

== Sources ==
- IWT
- Meer geld voor knappe koppen
- IWT-directievoorzitter Paul Zeeuwts plots overleden
- IWT-directievoorzitter Paul Zeeuwts plots overleden
