= Jan Arthur van Houtte =

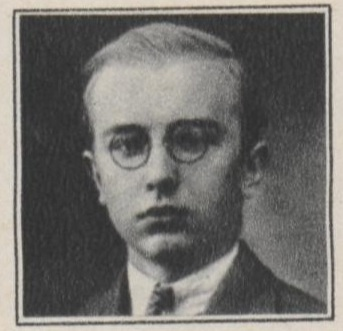
Van Houtte in his late teens (c. 1932)

Jan Arthur van Houtte (10 March 1913 – 20 December 2002) was a Belgian academic historian, professor at the Katholieke Universiteit Leuven, specialised in the economic and social history of the Low Countries in the late Middle Ages and the Early Modern period.

== Life ==
Van Houtte was born in Bruges on 10 March 1913 and was educated at the Sint-Lodewijkscollege in that city. Among his teachers there was Antoon Viaene, who became his mentor and later a friend.

Van Houtte matriculated at the Catholic University of Leuven in 1930. He obtained his doctorate there in 1936 with a dissertation on commercial brokers in medieval Bruges, and was appointed to the academic staff. He was an editor of the reference series Algemene Geschiedenis der Nederlanden (1949-1958) and in 1961 became editor of the journal Bijdragen voor de Geschiedenis der Nederlanden. At his retirement a collection of his articles was published under the title Essays on Medieval and Early Modern Economy and Society (Leuven, 1977). In retirement he served some years as director of the Academia Belgica.

He died in Heverlee on 20 December 2002.

== Publications ==
- Economische geschiedenis: De historische wording van de hedendaagsche wereldeconomie (Antwerp and Brussels, 1938)
- Esquisse d'une histoire économique de la Belgique (Leuven, 1943)
- Du troc au commerce mondial: histoire économique générale (Brussels, 1945)
- Economische en sociale geschiedenis van de Lage Landen (Antwerp, 1964)
- Essays on Medieval and Early Modern Economy and Society (Leuven, 1977)
- An Economic History of the Low Countries, 800-1800 (London and New York, 1977)
- Europäische Wirtschafts- und Sozialgeschichte im Mittelalter (Stuttgart, 1980)

== Honours and awards ==
- Member of the Royal Flemish Academy of Belgium for Science and the Arts (1957)
- Foreign member of the Royal Netherlands Academy of Arts and Sciences (1975)
- Commander in the Order of Orange-Nassau
