= Queen Fabiola Foundation for Mental Health =

Former Belgian nonprofit organization

The Queen Fabiola Foundation for Mental Health is a Belgian non-profit organization, named after Queen Fabiola. It operates within the framework of the King Baudouin Foundation

The fund was founded on 10 October 2004 on World Mental Health Day. As its main objective the foundation organizes activities in the field of mental health and stimulates the exchange of ideas and good practice between the various organisations and association, which are active in this area.

== Objectives ==
The stated objectives of the foundation are:

1. stress the importance of mental health in Belgian society
2. obtain the involvement of the users and their families in the content and organisation of mental healthcare
3. support the work of healthcare providers who are active in the various forms of mental healthcare
4. encourage the sectors and actors concerned to participate actively in the optimisation of mental health
5. support the reflection on the various issues of mental health

== See also ==
- Queen Elisabeth Medical Foundation

== Sources ==
- Queen Fabiola Foundation for Mental Health
