= Katholieke Hogeschool Kempen =

Coordinates: 51°9′39.79″N 4°57′40.03″E

The Katholieke Hogeschool Kempen (KH Kempen, KHK) was a university-college where students could obtain a professional bachelor's degree (3 year education) in several domains. There was also the opportunity to study for a master's degree in engineering (4 years) in agriculture (bioscience) or an engineering degree in electronics. In 2012 the institution fused with Lessius Mechelen and Lessius Antwerp and now goes by under the name: Thomas More University-College.

== History ==
The institution was founded in 1995 at the merger of six Catholic higher education institutes of the Campine region of the province of Antwerp (Belgium). The Hoger Instituut voor Economische Wetenschappen, the Katholieke Industriële Hogeschool der Kempen, the Hoger Instituut voor Technische Wetenschappen, the Hoger Instituut voor Sociale Studies and the Hoger Instituut voor Technische en Paramedische Wetenschappen created the Hoger Instituut der Kempen (HIK) in Geel. The HIK merged with the higher education department of the Sint-Aloysiusinstituut voor Verpleegkunde in Lier, the Pedagogisch Hoger Onderwijs Kardinaal Van Roey-Instituut in Vorselaar, the Pedagogisch Hoger Instituut Heilig Graf and the Economische Hogeschool in Turnhout. The history of its predecessors dates back for more than 50 years. In 2002, the KHK joined in an association with the Katholieke Universiteit Leuven, together with 11 other Catholic institutions and the Catholic University of Brussels.

The university-college changed its name in 2012 to Thomas More Kempen. The institution now sails under the Thomas More brand-name.

== Location ==
The headquarters of the KHK are located in the city of Geel with several departments spread over the Campine, region of the province of Antwerp of Belgium.

== Departments ==
The institute consists of eleven departments. Six of its departments are located in Geel, while three departments are located in Turnhout and one in Lier and Vorselaar.

- Campus Geel (6 Departments):
  - Business Studies Department
  - Health Care and Chemistry Department
  - Biosciences and Technology Department
  - Agro and Biotechnology Department
  - Social Work Department
  - Technical Sciences Department
- Campus Lier:
  - Health Care Department
- Campus Turnhout (3 Departments):
  - Health Care Department
  - Teacher Education Department
  - Business Studies Department
- Campus Vorselaar:
  - Teacher Education Department

== Sources ==
- Eerste steen nieuwe KHK-campus (Dutch)
