= Queen Elisabeth Medical Foundation =

Belgian medical organization

Queen Elisabeth Medical Foundation

The Queen Elisabeth Medical Foundation (QEMF) is a Belgian non-profit organization, founded in 1926 by Elisabeth of Bavaria, wife of Albert I. She founded the organization, based on her experience with the wounded from the front-line during the First World War. The foundation wants to encourage laboratory research and contacts between researchers and clinical practitioners, with a particular focus on neurosciences. The QEMF supports seventeen university teams throughout Belgium.

== See also ==
- King Baudouin Foundation
- National Fund for Scientific Research
- Queen Elisabeth Music Competition
- Queen Fabiola Foundation for Mental Health
