= Cercle de Lorraine =

Former business club in Brussels, Belgium

The Cercle de Lorraine (French) or Club van Lotharingen (Dutch) was a Belgian business club, located in Brussels. The club was founded in 1998 to bring together distinguished and representative personalities from the Belgian financial community, both French-speaking (Walloons) as well as Dutch-speaking (Flemish), who were united within an honorary committee.

On 11 May 2020, the press reported that the Cercle de Lorraine was for sale due to financial difficulties. In August 2020, it was further reported that the Cercle would disappear and be replaced by a new concept currently being developed by its new owners.

== See also ==
- Cercle royal Gaulois artistique et littéraire
- De Warande
- Federation of Belgian Enterprises
- Olivaint Conference of Belgium
- Union Wallonne des Entreprises
- University Foundation
- VOKA

== Sources ==
- Marty, A. (1998). "Belgique Cercle de Lorraine". Réseaux d'influence : le guide des clubs en France et en Europe. Quelle est leur histoire ? Comment y entrer ? (in French). FeniXX réédition numérique. ISBN 978-2-402-48662-0.
