= List of faculties of law in Belgium =

This is a list of faculties of law in Belgium, by order of creation. All 11 universities of Belgium organise some level of law studies, half of which in the capital city Brussels.

- Faculty of Law and Criminology, University of Louvain (UCLouvain) – Louvain-la-Neuve (1425)
- Faculty of Law, Katholieke Universiteit Leuven – Leuven, Brussels, Hasselt (1425)
- Faculty of Law, Political Science and Criminology, University of Liège – Liège (1817)
- Faculty of Law and Criminology, Ghent University – Ghent (1817)
- Faculty of Law and Criminology, Université libre de Bruxelles – Brussels (1834)
- Faculty of Law, Saint-Louis University, Brussels (UCLouvain) – Brussels (1858)
- Faculty of Law, University of Antwerp — Antwerp (1965)
- Faculty of Law, University of Namur — Namur (1967)
- Faculty of Law and Criminology, Vrije Universiteit Brussel – Brussels (1971)
- School of Law, University of Mons (ULB) — Mons (2004) (Note: The University of Mons is not allowed to issue degrees in law. Instead, the Université libre de Bruxelles organises teaching and issues the degree, while UMons offers its physical infrastructure in the city.)
- Faculty of Law, Hasselt University — Hasselt (2008) (Note: Hasselt University organises teaching in law in the city of Hasselt together with KU Leuven and Maastricht University.)
