= Francqui Foundation =

Scientific foundation in Belgium

The Francqui Foundation was founded in 1932 by Emile Francqui and Herbert Hoover in Belgium. The foundation is by Royal Decree an Institution of Public Utility. The Francqui Foundation wants to encourage disinterested fundamental research.

The current chairman of the foundation is Herman Van Rompuy. Previous chairmen include Mark Eyskens and Jacques Groothaert.

== Activities ==
The Francqui Foundation makes their purpose a reality by working on four major initiatives :

1. The Francqui Prize : In 1933, the Francqui Prize was awarded for the first time. This prize is intended for those Belgians who have made an important contribution to science and thereby to Belgium. The Prize, awarded by the King himself, has a value of 250.000 EUR. Henri Pirenne, Christian de Duve, Ilya Prigogine, François Englert, Désiré Collen, Pierre Van Moerbeke, and Marie-Claire Foblets are among those who have received this prize.
2. The Francqui Chairs : These Chairs encourages exchanges between the different Belgian Universities. It also gives the opportunity to bring all the personalities of the discipline concerned together, and to emphasize this cooperation.
3. Mandates : The Foundation awards a few International Francqui Professor Chairs annually. The Chairs should allow the stay of this high level foreign scientist in Belgium for an uninterrupted period of three to six months. The Foundation also grants the mandates of Francqui Research Professor at Belgian universities for a period of three years. This mandate gives an opportunity to a professor or a young researcher to dedicate him- or herself to his/herresearch, with a reduced teaching assignment. And finally, the Francqui Foundation also proposes to award every two years the research grant "Francqui Start-Up Grant" to Universities. The allowance focuses on young researchers under the age of 40 who wish to be recruited by the University as academic staff.
4. The Francqui Fellowships : The Francqui Foundation works together with the Belgian American Education Foundation (BAEF) offering grants to promising young Belgians to study at an American University.

== See also ==
- Academia Belgica
- Belgian Academy Council of Applied Sciences
- Belgian American Educational Foundation (BAEF)
- National Fund for Scientific Research
- Science and technology in Belgium
- The Royal Academies for Science and the Arts of Belgium
- University Foundation
