= Katholieke Hogeschool Vives Noord =

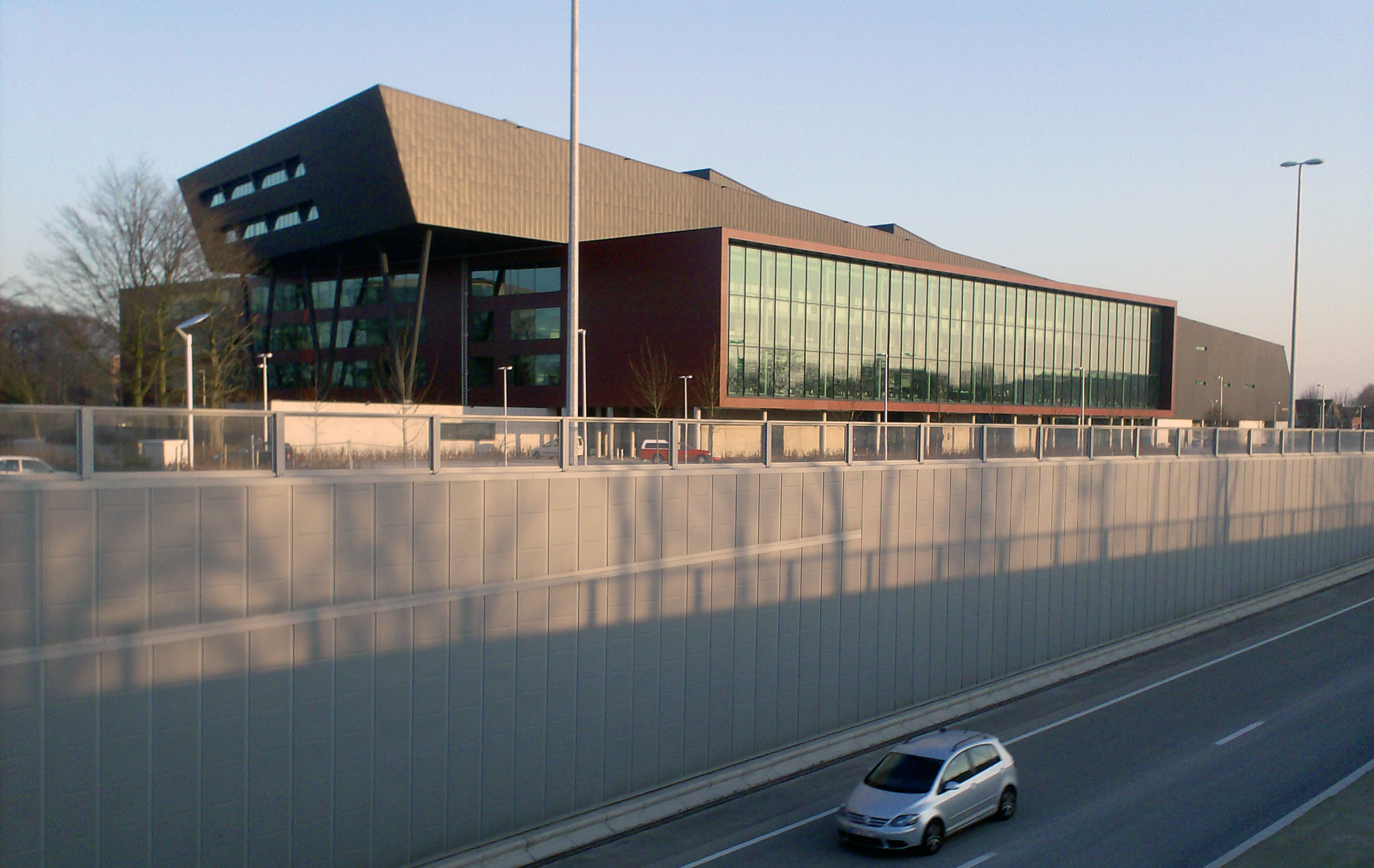
The KHBO campus in Sint-Michiels, Bruges.

Katholieke Hogeschool Brugge Oostende (KHBO) was a college for higher education in Belgium which was founded in the 1990s. It was the result of a merger between two colleges from Ostend and three colleges from Bruges. In 2013, KHBO merged with KATHO (Katholieke Hogeschool Zuid-West-Vlaanderen) into Hogeschool VIVES.

== Campuses ==
=== Bruges ===
In Bruges, there were programmes in economics, healthcare and education. In 2008 a new campus became the home of the three departments in Bruges.

At the department of healthcare, there were programmes in midwifery, nursing, occupational therapy, speech therapy and audiology. At the department of education, there were programmes for a degree in early childhood education, primary school teacher and secondary school teacher. At the department of economics, there were programmes in management, hotel management and tourism.

=== Ostend ===
In Ostend, there were curricula for bachelors and masters in engineering. The professional bachelors were on avionics, chemistry, electronics, ICT and mechanics. The master programmes were on civil engineering, mechanics, electronics and ICT.

== Association ==
As with most Catholic colleges in Flanders, KHBO was also a member of the K.U.Leuven Association.
