= Lessius Mechelen =

Lessius Mechelen University College
- Lessius Mechelen
- Location: Mechelen, Belgium
- Website: http://mechelen.lessius.eu/

The Lessius Mechelen is a university college located in Mechelen, Belgium.

It was created during a series of rationalization and merger operations in the Flemish higher education. In a first operation in 1995-1996 several existing schools were merged: a trade school, some schools for teachers, a school for interior design ("COLOMA") and a nurse school. In 2010, a second round of fusion and collaboration was performed in which the De Nayer Institute became a member as well.

The university college has several campuses: Vest, Ham, Botanique, Lucas Fayd'herbe and De Nayer. On campus Vest are the teacher courses (kindergarten, primary and secondary education), the Nursing and the Management Colleges. On Campus De Ham courses regarding journalism, communication management and office management are given. Information Management training, multimedia training and tourism and leisure management are located in campus Botanique. The Interior Design program is housed in campus Fayd'herbe Lucas. Finally there are the Bachelor and Master courses in industrial science, given in Campus De Nayer.

Lessius Mechelen has about 4300 students (2009-2010) and offers also some professional bachelor courses in evening and weekend education. The college also organizes a series of continuing education: bachelor after bachelor, master after master and postgraduates. Furthermore, the university college is active in applied research and consultancy.

This institute of higher education is a member of the K.U.Leuven Association.
