= BIPIB =

The Belgian Interdisciplinary Platform for Industrial Biotechnology or BIPIB is a Belgian organization which consists of three working groups which come together on biomass supply, bioprocesses and bioproducts, bio-energy. It was founded by Els Van Weert, Flemish secretary for sustainable development and social economy. The BIPIB was given the mission to provide advice for a long-term strategy for developing industrial biotechnology in Belgium.

January 2009 update: The platform is not active and no recommendations were implemented.

== See also ==
- Bioplastics

== Sources ==
- From the farmer’s field to your compost heap: how bioplastics will reduce waste
- Recommendations for industrial biotechnology
- Country report of Bio-based economy: January 2009 update - page 6 II.A.i
