= Belgian American Educational Foundation =

Belgian educational charity

BAEF Logo

The Belgian American Educational Foundation (BAEF) is an educational charity. It supports the exchange of university students, scientists and scholars between the United States and Belgium. The foundation fosters the higher education of deserving Belgians and Americans through its exchange-fellowship program. Since 1977, Dr. Emile Boulpaep is the president of the BAEF.

== History ==
During World War I, from October 1914, Herbert Hoover organized the Committee for Relief in Belgium (USA) and the Commission for Relief in Belgium (Belgium). After the war, the University Foundation, and on 9 January 1920, the B.A.E.F., were founded with the budget remaining in the hands of the commission after five years of relief work. The Belgian American Educational Foundation became the heir of the Commission for Relief in Belgium.

After World War I, the BAEF invested in land and buildings for the Université libre de Bruxelles (Solbosch/Solbos campus) and also for rebuilding the library of the Catholic University of Leuven. In 1925, the BAEF founded the Hoover Foundation for the Development of the University of Brussels and the Hoover Foundation for the Development of the University of Leuven. The BAEF started providing scholarships for students study abroad.

Today, the Hoover Foundation is still divided into two entities: one is still dedicated to the Université libre de Bruxelles (ULB) and Vrije Universiteit Brussel (VUB) in Brussels and the second and biggest one is dedicated to the development of the University of Louvain (UCLouvain) primarily in Louvain-la-Neuve and Brussels, and the KU Leuven in Leuven.

== Notable alumni ==
- Georges Lemaître
- Emile Boulpaep
- Karel Bossart
- Lotte Brand Philip
- Eva Brems
- Albert Claude
- Alexander De Croo
- Gaston Eyskens
- Mark Eyskens
- Corneille Heymans
- Jean Charles Snoy et d'Oppuers
- Denis Wirtz
- Pierre Wigny
- Paul van Zeeland
- Charles du Bus de Warnaffe

== See also ==
- Emile Francqui
- Herbert Hoover
- Prince Albert Fund
- Olivaint Conference of Belgium
- Paul Dana
- Academic mobility
- American Relief Administration (ARA)
- Commission for Relief in Belgium
- EducationUSA
- Effect of World War I on Children in the United States
- ERASMUS programme (European Union)
- Fulbright Program (United States)
- Jean Cattier
- Felicien Cattier
