= List of Belgian Nobel laureates =

This is a list of the Belgian Nobel laureates

Year	Image	Laureate	Field	Life	Citation
2026		Francis Halzen	Physics	1944–	“for decisive contributions to the IceCube Neutrino Observatory and the discovery of high-energy neutrinos of astrophysical origin”
2013		François Englert	Physics	1932–2026	"for the theoretical discovery of a mechanism that contributes to our understanding of the origin of mass of subatomic particles, and which recently was confirmed through the discovery of the predicted fundamental particle, by the ATLAS and CMS experiments at CERN's Large Hadron Collider" shared with Peter Higgs
1977		Ilya Prigogine	Chemistry	1917–2003	"for his contributions to non-equilibrium thermodynamics, particularly the theory of dissipative structures"
1974		Albert Claude and Christian De Duve	Physiology or Medicine	1898–1983 (Claude); 1917–2013 (De Duve)	"for their discoveries concerning the structural and functional organization of the cell" with George E. Palade
1958		Dominique Pire	Peace	1910–1969	No citation
1938		Corneille Heymans	Physiology or Medicine	1892–1968	"for the discovery of the role played by the sinus and aortic mechanisms in the regulation of respiration"
1919		Jules Bordet	Physiology or Medicine	1870–1961	"for his discoveries relating to immunity"
1913		Henri La Fontaine	Peace	1854–1943	No citation
1911		Maurice Maeterlinck	Literature	1862–1949	"in appreciation of his many-sided literary activities, and especially of his dramatic works, which are distinguished by a wealth of imagination and by a poetic fancy, which reveals, sometimes in the guise of a fairy tale, a deep inspiration, while in a mysterious way they appeal to the readers' own feelings and stimulate their imaginations"
1909		Auguste Marie François Beernaert	Peace	1829–1912	With Paul-Henri-Benjamin d'Estournelles de Constant (no citation)
1904		Institut de Droit International	Peace	Founded 1873	No citation

== See also ==
- Science and technology in Belgium
- Belgian literature
