= Von Karman Institute for Fluid Dynamics =

Belgian nonprofit organization

Coordinates: 50°45′20.60″N 4°23′10.60″E

The von Karman Institute for Fluid Dynamics
- Logo of VKI
- Formation: 1956
- Headquarters: Sint-Genesius-Rode, Belgium
- Official language: English, French and Dutch
- Director: Peter Grognard
- Website: www.vki.ac.be

The von Karman Institute for Fluid Dynamics (VKI) is a non-profit educational and scientific organization which specializes in three specific fields: aeronautics and aerospace, environment and applied fluid dynamics, turbomachinery and propulsion. Founded in 1956, it is located in Sint-Genesius-Rode, Belgium.

== About ==
The von Karman Institute for Fluid Dynamics is a non-profit international, educational and scientific organization which is working in three specific fields: aeronautics and aerospace, environment and applied fluid dynamics, turbomachinery and propulsion.

The VKI provides education in these specific areas for students from all over the world. A hundred students come to the Institute each year to study fluid dynamics, for a PhD programme, a research master in Fluid Dynamics, a final year project and also to gather further knowledge while doing a work placement in a specific area.

The institute organises an annual programme of lectures and events, held both internally and at external venues. These cover topics including aerodynamics, fluid mechanics, heat transfer, and their applications to aeronautics, space exploration, turbomachinery, environmental science and industrial fluid dynamics. The institute has developed an international reputation in these fields.

== History ==
In the course of 1955, Professor Theodore von Kármán proposed with his assistants the establishment of an institution devoted to training and research in aerodynamics which would be open to young engineers and scientists of the NATO nations. It was strongly felt that this form of international undertaking would fulfil the important objective of fostering fruitful exchanges and understanding between the participating nations in a well-defined technical field.

The von Karman Institute was established in October 1956 in the buildings which formed what then was the aeronautical laboratory of the Civil Aviation Authority of the Belgian Ministry of Communications.

The history of the laboratory goes back to 1922 when, on farmland purchased by the Belgian Government, the first building was erected to house the STAé (Service Technique de l'Aéronautique), i.e. the technical services of the Civil Aviation Authority then under the Ministry of Defence. The building was designed to accommodate a large low speed wind tunnel of the Eiffel type with an open return circuit and open-jet test section of 2 m diameter, as well as offices and shops. It still exists and has been refurbished internally after removal of the low speed tunnel to make room for modern turbomachinery and high speed facilities. A second building was added in 1935 to house offices and laboratories. It is now the Institute's administrative building. The last addition was made after the war, in 1949, with the construction of a large building specially designed to house a supersonic tunnel and a multi-configuration low speed facility.

The AGARD Study Group of 1955 stated, in terms of training and research: "The Institute should aim toward a training which, apart from its direct and obvious ties with aeronautical industries, would be of value in wider areas such as industrial or scientific research where the application of experimental techniques of aerodynamics would be profitable".

== Structure ==
There are three departments which are hosted at the von Karman Institute for Fluid Dynamics, from the older to the younger:

Aeronautics and Aerospace

A wide spectrum of facilities and computational tools covers the flow range from the low-speed regime of commercial aircraft to the supersonic and hypersonic regime of atmospheric space entry. The department focuses in particular on the modeling, simulation and experimental validation of atmospheric entry flows and thermal protection systems (TPS), including transition to turbulence and stability. The experimental studies are carried out in its top level Mach 14, Mach 6 and Induction Coupled Plasma windtunnels, for which dedicated measuring techniques have been developed e.g. involving spectroscopic laser techniques. On the computational simulation side the department has developed an extendable software platform Coolfluid for high performance computational flow simulation which incorporates the research on numerical algorithms, advanced physico-chemical and plasma models as well as fluid-structure interaction and conjugate heat transfer.

Turbomachinery & Propulsion

On the computational side, the department has over 20 years of experience in the analysis of flow in turbomachines, and in the design techniques and multi-disciplinary optimization methods or their components.

Environmental and applied Fluid Dynamics

The Environmental and Applied Fluid Dynamics (EA) department covers all kinds of activities complementary to the other two departments related to fluid dynamics in the academic and industrial world. It has a large expertise in the study of aeroacoustics, multiphase flows, vehicle aerodynamics, biological flows and environmental flows (including the study of interaction between atmospheric winds and human activities). The department is also involved in the modeling of turbulence and in the development of advanced measurement techniques for fluid dynamics. The department has acquired a unique expertise in the study of fluid dynamics in industrial processes, with the development and construction of experimental facilities dedicated to the study of industrial processes and also in the simulation of industrial flows using CFD (Computational Fluid Dynamics) codes.

== Lecture series ==
The VKI organises up to twelve different one-week Lecture Series with about 50 to 60 participants on specialized topics every year on various fields: industrial applications, turbomachinery, aerospace, aerodynamics, propulsion, aero engine, aeroacoustics, biological flows, large eddy simulation.

Each year, the VKI also organises thematic conferences in collaboration with Belgian & foreign universities and research institutes.

The institute offers courses on a range of topics taught by lecturers from academia and industry.

== See also ==
- Belgian Federal Science Policy Office (BELSPO)
- European Space Agency (ESA)
- European Union (Europa)
- NATO Research and Technology Organisation (NATO-RTO)
