= Antwerp Maritime Academy =

Coordinates: 51.2405°N 4.3983°E

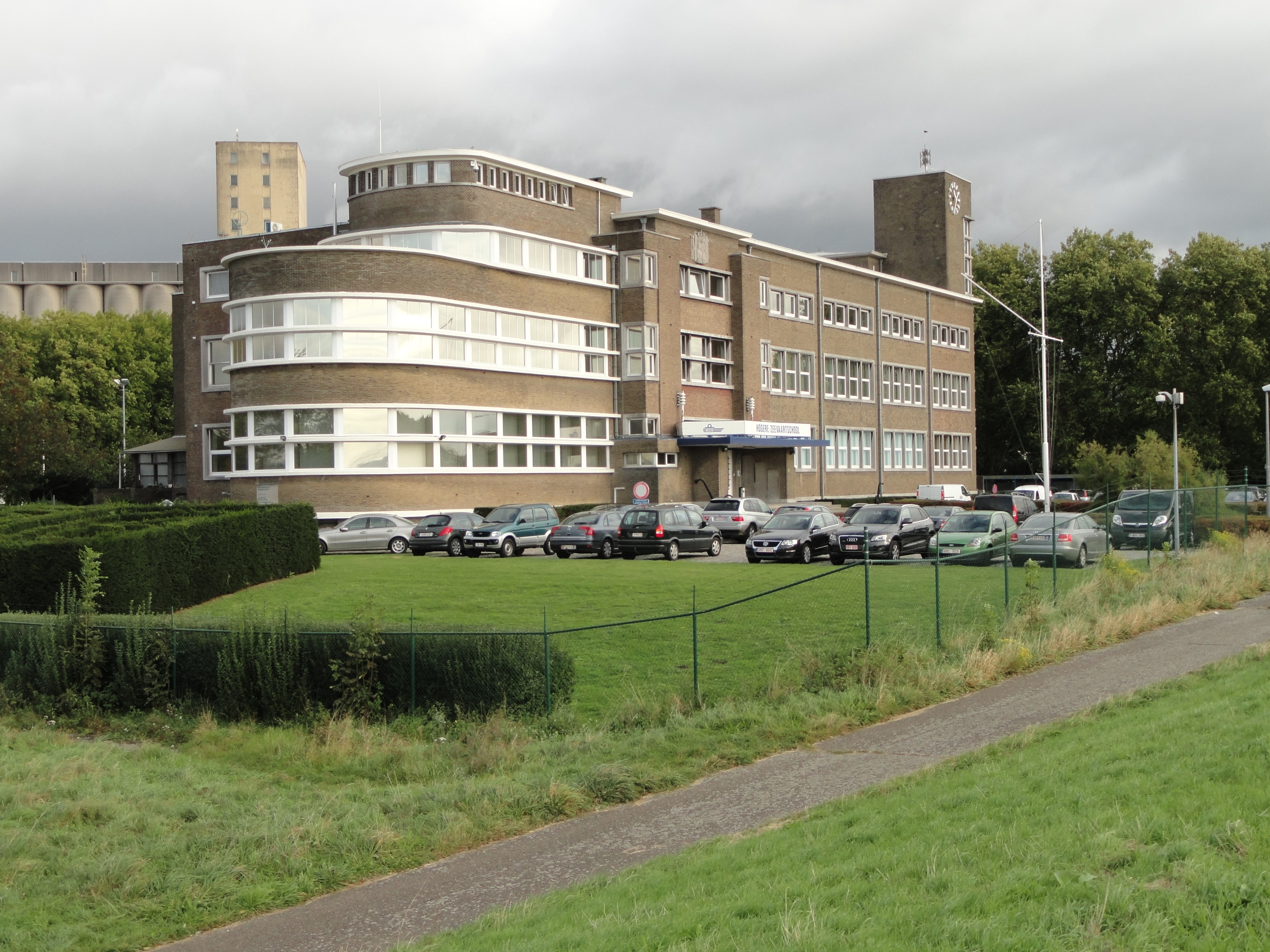
The Maritime Academy in Antwerp

The Antwerp Maritime Academy (Dutch: Hogere Zeevaartschool Antwerpen; French: École supérieure de navigation d'Anvers) is a university college in Belgium, located in the north of Antwerp. The academy trains future officers of the Merchant Navy and Belgian Navy. The Antwerp Maritime Academy is the only Vocational university in Belgium allowed to teach in both Vernaculars, being Dutch and French. There are two sections at the academy: Nautical science and Marine engineering. Marine engineering: results in a Bachelor's Degree in Marine Engineering after a three-year cycle. To obtain a Master's Degree in Marine engineering a second, one-year cycle is required. Nautical science: results in a Bachelor's Degree in Nautical Sciences after a three-year cycle. To obtain a Master's Degree in Nautical Sciences a second, one-year cycle is required. The Bachelor's and Master's Degree in Nautical Sciences are multidimensional: technical subjects combined with languages, economics, (maritime) medicine and (international) law. The courses do not only have to comply with regulations set by the local education authorities, they have to meet stringent international and quality-standard requirements set by the International Maritime Organization (IMO). The Antwerp Maritime Academy is, because of her specific profile, the smallest academy in Flanders with ca. 670 students.

== History ==
14th century marine officers have been trained in Antwerp since at least the 14th century. Napoleon Bonaparte founded an academy in 1800. Napoleon's plan was to make Antwerp a base of operations against England, together with major changes in the harbor, a renewed training for his officers was part of making "Scheldt and Antwerp, a gun pointed at the heart of England." In 1834 the academy was refounded under the Belgian regime. Initially the courses were given only in French. The school fell under the Ministry of Transport because "the rules of the road" were a major part of the curriculum. Starting from 1907, each class of first year students in Nautical Sciences is named after a distinguished maritime personality. From 1977 on, this is also done for the Marine Engineering department.

In 1919 courses were resumed after suspension during World War I. During the Interbellum motorized sea-traffic increased and a separate Dutch section was created at the academy. These changes created the need for a bigger school and a new building in the Van de Velde-style was inaugurated in 1932. During World War II, the German army occupied the building and courses were given at the seamens' house. In 1948 lessons were resumed at the school.
