= Science and technology in Belgium =

Science and technology in Belgium is well developed with the presence of several universities and research institutes.

== Background ==
As Belgium is a federal state, science is organized at two levels. At the national level, there is the Belgian Federal Science Policy Office (BELSPO), and each of the three regions, Brussels-Capital Region, Flanders and Wallonia, have their own regional science and technology development:

- Science and technology in Brussels
- Science and technology in Flanders
- Science and technology in Wallonia

Belgium is known for its science and technology. It has also improved its weaponry. Belgium was ranked 21st in the Global Innovation Index in 2025.

== See also ==
- Belgian Federal Science Policy Office (BELSPO)
- Royal Academies for Science and the Arts of Belgium
- List of Belgian Nobel laureates
- Interuniversity Microelectronics Centre
- Economy of Belgium
- Education in Belgium
- Open access in Belgium

== Sources ==
- BELSPO
- Belgian Portal for Research and Innovation
