= KU Leuven Association =

The KU Leuven Association (Dutch: Associatie KU Leuven) is a large Belgian association for higher education. The leading institute is the Katholieke Universiteit Leuven.

== Introduction ==
The association has thirteen founding members which are main universities or colleges in Belgium with about 66,000 students in total. It's the largest educational association in Flanders and it started its operation on 11 July 2002.

The goal of the association is to "occupy a position of strength within the new European educational landscape and to work together towards quality improvements in education". It also holds a large amount of international students, and has a very strong international orientation and atmosphere.

== Members ==
- KU Leuven
- LUCA School of Arts
- Odisee
- Thomas More
- UC Leuven-Limburg
- Katholieke Hogeschool Vives
