= François Folie =

Belgian astronomer

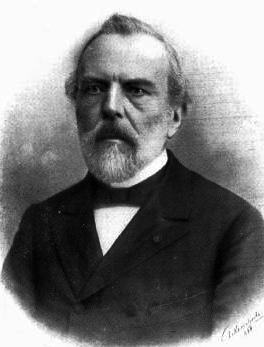
- Born: 11 December 1833; Venlo, Belgium later The Netherlands
- Died: 29 January 1905 (aged 71); Brussels, Belgium
- Education: Université de Liège
- Occupations: Astronomer; Mathematician
- Spouse: Adelina Quinet
- Children: 11, including Franz
- Scientific career
- Fields: Astronomer
- Workplaces: University of Liège; Royal Observatory of Belgium
- Doctoral students: Constantin Le Paige
- Other notable students: Marcel Dehalu

François Folie (1833–1905) was a Belgian astronomer. He was the administrator at the University of Liège, director of the Institute of Astrophysics at the Cointe Observatory, and director of the Royal Observatory of Belgium.

== Early life ==
Folie was born on 11 December 1833 in Venlo (then in Belgium). He was the oldest of seven children. In 1830, Belgium declared itself independent from The Netherlands, and there was a treaty discussion going on to determine the status of the regions. The treaty placed Venlo back in the Netherlands, so his father moved to Liège, as he was in the military and a captain in the Belgian artillery. In Belgium, his father was put in charge of teaching pyrotechnics and artillery advancements to the army.

Folie went to college in Liège and on 13 August 1855 Folie earned a doctorate in mathematics and physics. His father died young and Folie had to support his mother and 6 siblings.

== Later life and Bonn ==
He started to teach in 1857 at the University of Liège. While doing this, he briefly (two months) went to Bonn and started working with Friedrich Wilhelm Argelander in astronomy. He helped in a study of variable stars and with others assisted with a star catalog of the northern hemisphere. Also, while there, he studied thermodynamics under Rudolf Clausius. He took that training back with him to Liège and started teaching thermodynamics in 1867.

On 5 May 1873, Folie married Adalina (born in 1849). Folie and Adalina had 11 children. He is the father of Franz Folie, poet, playwright and Belgian historian who wrote under the alias of Franz Ansell.

Folie was the Administer at the University of Liège from 1872 to 1884, it was under his administration that most of the buildings of science and medicine were built. In particular, the Cointe Observatory which held the Institute of Astrophysics. He remained director of the institute until 1893. In 1883, he succeeded Jean-Charles Houzeau as director of the Royal Observatory of Belgium.

In 1885 Folie became observatory director in Brussels. Because of the increase in size of Brussels it was no longer a good city to do astronomy and he built an observatory at Uccle.

He visited the Bonn observatory several times where he worked on astronomy with Friedrich Wilhelm Argelander and Adalbert Krüger.

He was a correspondent of the German physicist Rudolf Clausius and taught the theory of thermodynamics. He did work on the movements of a solid body (1885), in geometry (in particular with Constantin Le Paige) and on stellar reductions (Twelve tables for calculating stellar reductions 1883, Treaty of stellar reductions 1888). He was a member of the Royal Academy of Science, Letters and Fine Arts of Belgium.

Towards the end of his life he published a summary of all his works under the title Thirty-Five Years of Mathematical and Astronomical Work. In 1897 he retired but continued publishing until he died in Liège, Belgium on 29 January 1905.

== Sources ==
- (in French) Eug. De Seyn, Dictionnaire biographique des Sciences, des Lettres et des Arts en Belgique, Tome I, 1935
- (in Swedish) Salmonsens konversationsleksikon
