= Gembloux Agro-Bio Tech =

Faculty of the University of Liège, Belgium

Coordinates: 50.5623°N 4.696°E

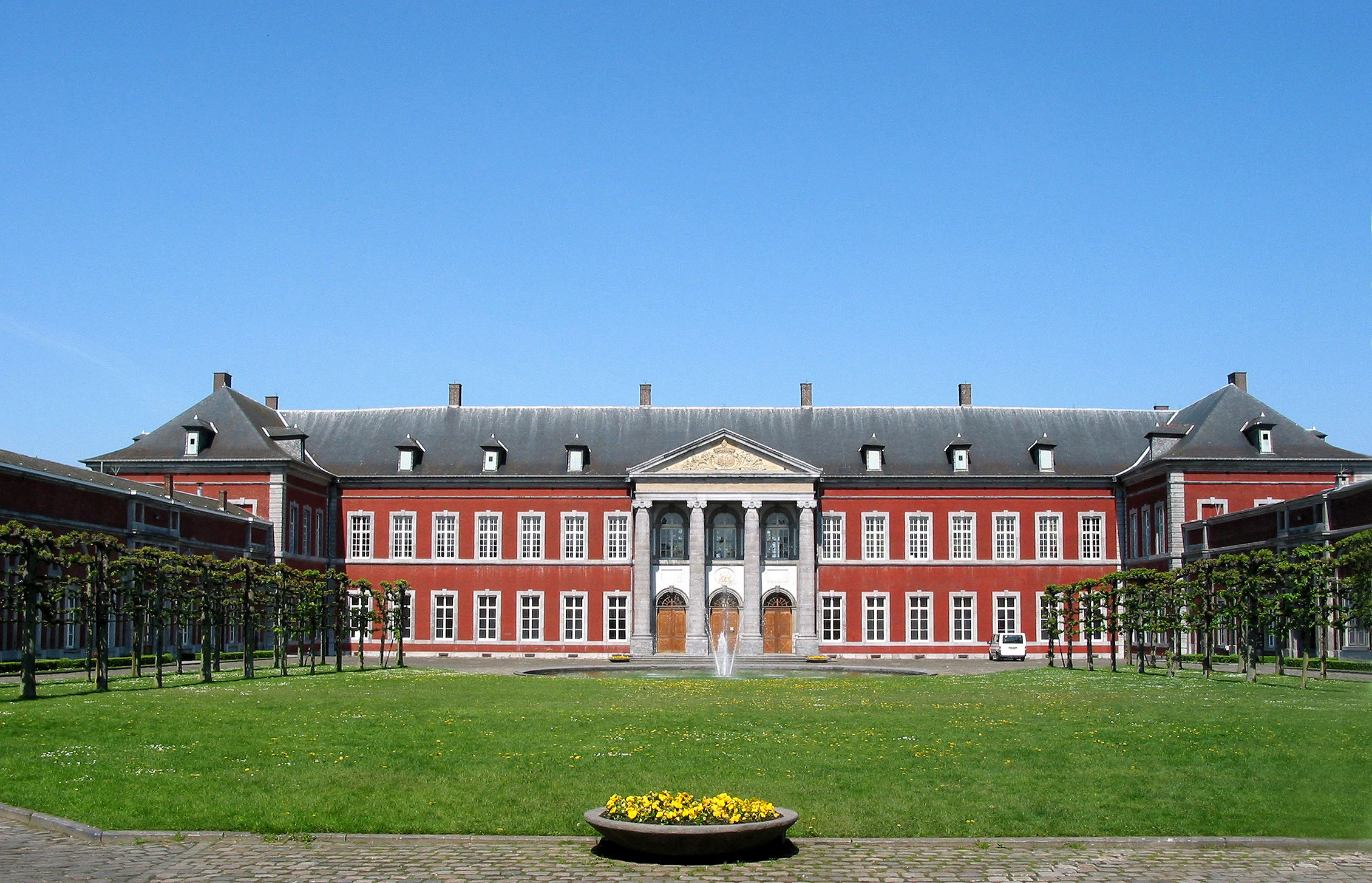
- The faculty's main building.
- Other name: GxABT
- Former names: Institut agricole de Gembloux (1860); Institut agronomique de l'État (1920); Faculté universitaire des sciences agronomiques de l’État (1965); Faculté universitaire des sciences agronomiques de Gembloux (1994)
- Type: Public university
- Established: 1860 (166 years ago)
- Parent institution: University of Liège
- Academic affiliations: Commission des Titres d'Ingénieur; EUR-ACE label Conférence des Grandes écoles
- Rector: Prof. Pierre Wolper
- Dean: Frédéric Francis
- Students: 1,200
- Location: Gembloux, Belgium
- Language: French
- Colors: Pale green & ULiège teal blue
- Website: gembloux.uliege.be

Gembloux Agro-Bio Tech (GxABT), located in Gembloux, Belgium, is one of the eleven faculties of the University of Liège. Founded in 1860 and previously known as the Faculté universitaire des sciences agronomiques de Gembloux (FUSAGx, French for: Gembloux Agronomical University), it is Belgium's oldest educational and research institution dedicated to agronomic sciences and biological engineering. It is the only school in Belgium to be accredited by the French Commission des Titres d'Ingénieur allowing the university to deliver the Diplôme d'Ingénieur engineering degree. The school is also accredited by the EUR-ACE label, the highest European quality label for engineering degree programmes at Bachelor and Master level.

Prior to 2009, it was an independent public university of the French Community of Belgium.

== History ==
The university is housed in the historical Abbey of Gembloux, which was founded around 940. After the French Revolution, monks were expelled, and the abbey was sold. In July 1860, the agronomic school of Thourout is transferred in Gembloux, founding the Gembloux Agricultural Institute. The Belgian State definitely buys the abbey in 1881 and in 1920, the school is renamed into the State Agricultural Institute (Institut agronomique de l'État). The name is changed again in 1965 into the State University of Agricultural Sciences (Faculté universitaire des sciences agronomiques de l’État) and again in 1994 into the Gembloux University of Agricultural Sciences (Faculté universitaire des sciences agronomiques de Gembloux) after its administration was transferred from the Federal State to the French Community of Belgium.

In 2009, it was merged with the University of Liège and renamed to Gembloux Agro-Bio Tech (GxABT). Its official language has always been French.

== Studies ==
The Faculty of Gembloux Agro-Bio Tech is dedicated exclusively to agronomic sciences and biological engineering. The five-year program on offer at the Faculty trains bioengineers in the making. Students can choose a specialization from among four different courses of study in the field of life sciences:

- Environmental science and technology
- Forest and natural space management
- Agronomic science
- Chemistry and bioindustries

Gembloux Agro Bio Tech also organizes the first year of the bachelor's program in Landscape architecture, in partnership with the Haute École Charlemagne and the Institute of Architecture of La Cambre.

== See also ==
- Crealys Science Park
- Science and technology in Wallonia
- Science Parks of Wallonia

== Sources ==
Media related to Gembloux Agro-Bio Tech at Wikimedia Commons

- Gembloux Agricultural University
