= BioLiège =

BioLiège

BioLiège is a Belgian association of academic groups of the University of Liège (Liège) and several biotech companies comprising a biotechnopole. The association groups research and development in areas such as human medicine, pharmaceutical industry, toxicology, veterinary medicine, agriculture and plant biotechnology, water treatment, waste management, biodegradation control and the textile industry. Most of the biotech companies are located in the research park of Liège, close to the university campus of Sart Tilman.

== See also ==
- Science Parks of Wallonia
- GIGA
- Liège Science Park

== Sources ==
- BioLiège (French)
- BioLiège (French)
