= University of Mons =

University in Mons, Belgium

- Université de Mons
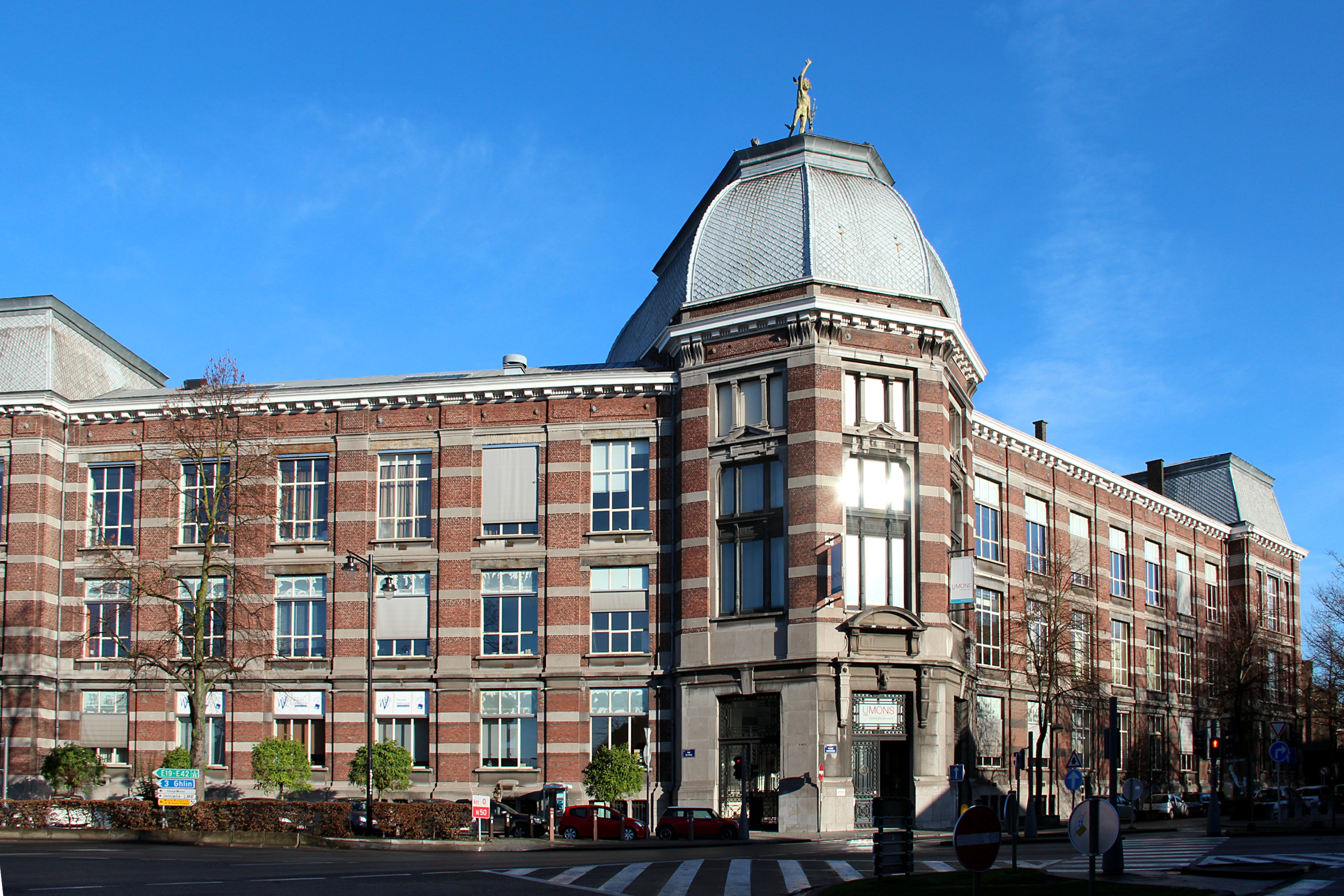
- University of Mons in December 2012
- Established: 1 January 2009 (17 years ago)
- Affiliations: Académie Wallonie-Bruxelles; Pôle Hainuyer; AUE; AUF; TIME Network
- Rector: Phillipe Dubois
- Students: 11,000 (2022)
- Location: Mons, Belgium; 50.458432°N 3.953098°E
- Campus: Mons Charleroi
- Website: web.umons.ac.be/en/

The University of Mons (French: Université de Mons, pronounced [ynivɛʁsite də mɔ̃s]) is a Belgian university located in the city of Mons, founded in 2009 by merging the Engineering Faculty of Mons (FPMs) and the University of Mons-Hainaut. The merging of the institutions was achieved following a geographical logic because of the high complementarity between them and their location in the same city.

This merger was accepted by the two universities on 6 July 2007 and confirmed by the Belgian French Community Parliament on 25 November 2008. From an administrative point of view the University of Mons was founded on 1 January 2009.

Prof. Calogero Conti, former rector of the Engineering Faculty of Mons, became the first rector of the University of Mons.

The University of Mons is the fourth (of six) university of the French community of Belgium with over 10,000 students.

== Faculties ==
- Faculté Polytechnique de Mons (FPMs) - Faculty of Engineering
- Faculty of Economics and Management (Warocqué)
- Faculty of Psychology and Education Sciences
- Faculty of Medicine and Pharmacy
- Faculty of Sciences
- Faculty of Translation and Interpretation (FTI-EII)
- Faculty of Architecture and Town Planning (from 2010)

== Institutes ==
- Institute for Social Sciences
- Institute for Legal Sciences
- Institute for Language Sciences

== Research ==
- 20 research fields (grouping several labs per research field)
- 4 research centres:
  - Multitel (ICT)
  - Materia Nova (Materials)
  - Inisma (Ceramic materials)
  - CETIC (ICT)
- Dozens of Spin-offs, Start-ups, Patents ...

== Education ==
Several "International Master" programs (all courses in English) were set up in collaboration with the Université Libre de Bruxelles within the Brussels-Mons Institute of Engineering:

- TELEMDIA

The TELEMEDIA programme is designed for telecom and multimedia aficionados willing to gain skills and knowledge in those applied fields. The degree is definitely an asset in leading sectors such as: satellites, phone services, cable broadcasting and telephony, multimedia applications, computer networks, data security, mobile phone and internet telecommunication technology.

- BIOSYS

BIOSYS is a specialized Master in Biosystems Engineering, focusing on methods and techniques for measurement, signal processing, system modelling, optimization and control with applications in medical signal and image processing, as well as process applications in the bio-industry, including red, green and white biotechnology.

- MATERIALS SCIENCE - FROM DESIGN TO APPLICATIONS

The master's degree in Materials Science "From Design to Applications" aims at providing a multidisciplinary, research-oriented training in Materials Science. Note that this master benefits from a multidisciplinary collaboration between the Schools of Engineering and Faculties of Science. It also benefits from the participation of the Materia Nova and INISMa research centres.

== Academic Profiles ==
University rankings

Global – Overall
- ARWU World: 901-1000 (2020)
- CWUR World: 854 (2020-21)
- QS World: 781-790 (2026)
- USNWR Global: =618 (2021)

The university is included in major world university rankings, e.g. that of the Academic Ranking of World Universities, QS World University Rankings and U.S. News & World Report Best Global University Ranking.

== Notable alumni ==
- Elio Di Rupo, chemist, politician, and former prime minister of Belgium.
- Soumia Fahd, Moroccan herpetologist
- Greta Tintin Eleonora Ernman Thunberg, activist
- Muhammad Yunus, Economist

== See also ==
- Initialis Science Park
- Science and technology in Wallonia
- Science Parks of Wallonia
- Top Industrial Managers for Europe
- University Foundation
