= Constantin Le Paige =

Belgian mathematician

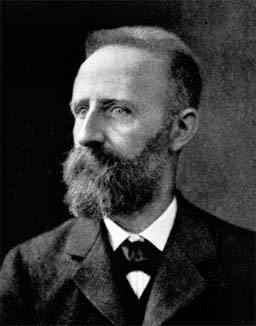
- Born: 9 March 1852; Liège, Belgium
- Died: 26 January 1929 (aged 76); Liège, Belgium
- Education: University of Liège
- Scientific career
- Fields: Mathematics
- Workplaces: University of Liège
- Doctoral advisor: François Folie
- Other academic advisors: Eugène Charles Catalan
- Doctoral students: Marcel Dehalu

Constantin Marie Le Paige (9 March 1852 – 26 January 1929) was a Belgian mathematician.

Born in Liège, Le Paige began studying mathematics in 1869 at the University of Liège. After studying analysis under Professor Eugène Charles Catalan, Le Paige became a professor at the Université de Liège in 1882.

While interested in astronomy and the history of mathematics, Le Paige mainly worked on the theory of algebraic form, especially algebraic curves and surfaces and more particularly for his work on the construction of cubic surfaces. Le Paige remained at the university until his retirement in 1922.
