= Faculty of Law, Political Science and Criminology of the University of Liège =

Coordinates: 50.5848°N 5.5713°E

Faculty of Law, Political Science and Criminology
- Faculté de droit, de science politique et de criminologie
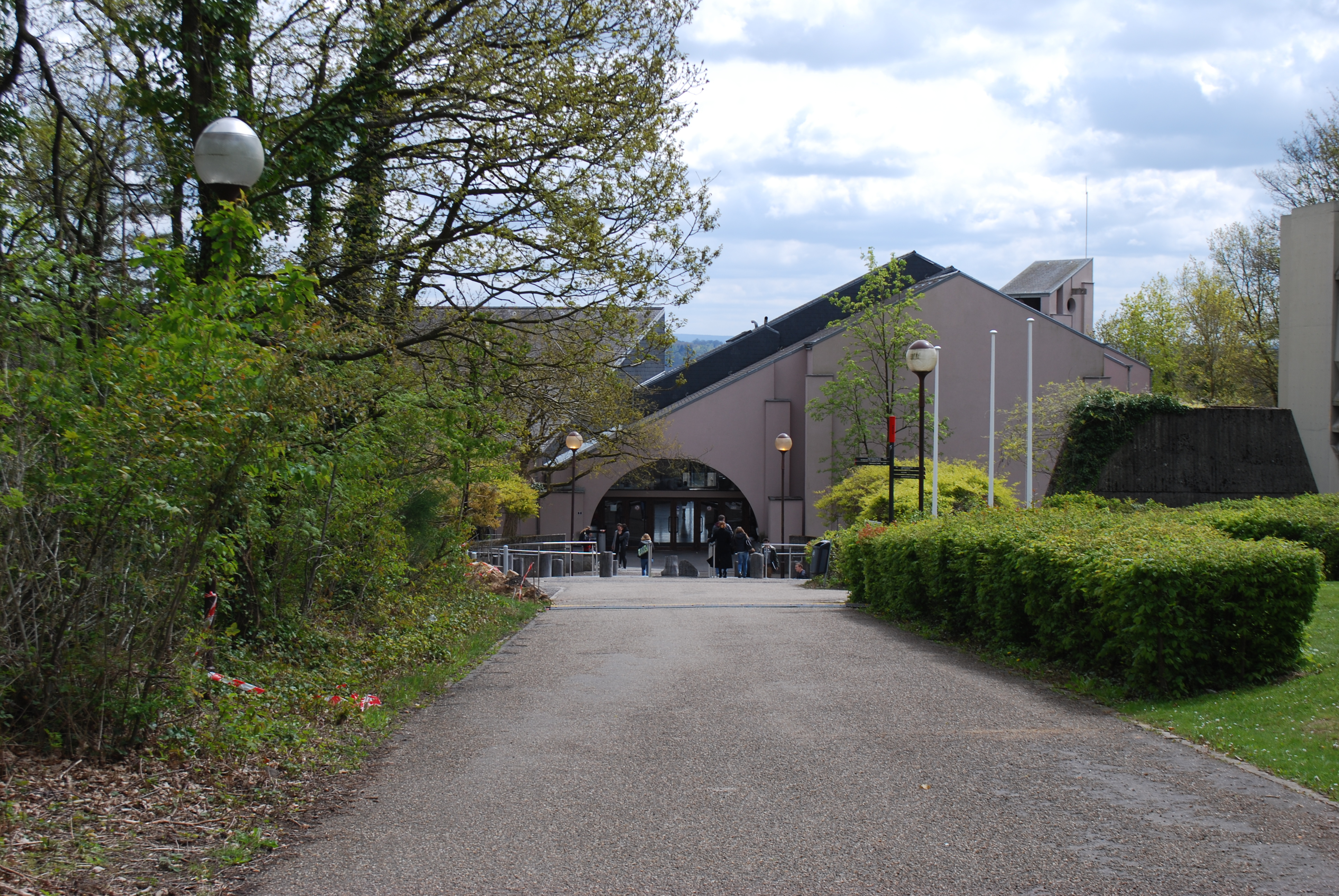
- The faculty's main building.
- Former names: Faculty of Law (1816)
- Motto: Scientia Optimum
- Motto in English: Excellence through science
- Type: Public university
- Established: 1816 (210 years ago)
- Parent institution: University of Liège
- Rector: Prof. Pierre Wolper
- Dean: Yves-Henri Leleu
- Students: 1,800
- Location: Liège, Belgium
- Language: French
- Colours: Violet & ULiège teal blue
- Website: droit.uliege.be

The Faculty of Law, Political Science and Criminology of the University of Liège is a faculty of the University of Liège located in Liège, Belgium. Founded in 1816 as one of the state university's four original faculties, it brings together the departments of law, of political science, and the Jean Constant Liège School of Criminology.

The current dean of the faculty is Professor Yves-Henri Leleu.

== History ==
The history of the Faculty of Law begins with that of the University of Liège itself on 25 September 1816. The Faculty of Law is, together with the Faculties of Medicine, Science and Philosophy, one of the four original faculties founded at the time of the creation of the university.

Initially located in the city-center of Liège, the faculty moved to the Sart Tilman campus during the 1980s, like most departments of the university.

== Building & architecture ==
The Faculty of Law building, designed by architect Claude Strebelle and inaugurated in 1981, is located at 7 boulevard du Rectorat within the Sart Tilman campus.

== Programmes ==
=== Department of Law ===
==== Bachelor degrees ====
- Bachelor in law

==== Master degrees ====
- Master in law, with specialized studies in
  - private law (Belgian, European and international aspects)
  - public and administrative law (Belgian, European and international aspects)
  - corporate law (Belgian, European and international aspects)
  - social law (Belgian, European and international aspects)
  - criminal law (Belgian, European and international aspects)
  - inter-university mobility (Erasmus+ or other mobility)
  - management and management-law (this master's degree gives access to HEC Liège Management School's Master in management sciences in one year)

==== Advanced master degrees ====
- Advanced master in European law, competition law and intellectual property law (bilingual French-English)
- Advanced master in tax law
- Advanced master in notary law

Doctoral degrees

- Doctorate (PhD) in legal studies

=== Department of Political Science ===
==== Bachelor degrees ====
- Bachelor in political science

==== Master degrees ====
- Master in political science (1 year programme)
- Master in political science, with specialized studies in
  - European Policies
  - European policies and Euro-Mediterranean relations (double degree with the University of Catania)
  - Public Administration
  - International relations
  - Science, Technology and Society (double degree with Maastricht University)

Doctoral degrees

- Doctorate (PhD) in Political and Social Sciences

=== Jean Constant Liège School of Criminology ===
==== Master degrees ====
- Master in criminology, with specialized studies
- Master in criminology, with advanced studies

Doctoral degrees

- Doctorate (PhD) in Criminology

== Research institute and centres ==
Researchers are part of the Governance, Justice and Society Research Unit, abbreviated Cité.

Research centers include:

- French-speaking Belgian Association for Town and Country Planning Law
- Inter-University Centre for Notarial Law (CIDN), with UCLouvain
- Chronicles of Law for the Use of Justices of the Peace and Police Officers
- Notarial Chronicles
- Royal Commission on Law and Business (CrDVA)
- University-Palais Commission (CUP), with UCLouvain
- Fernand Dehousse Institute for European Legal Studies (IEJE)
- Institute for Business Dispute Resolution (IBDR)
- Liege Competition and Innovation Institute (LCII)
- Tax Institute

== Notably faculty and alumni ==
=== Professors ===
- Fernand Dehousse
- Renaud Dehousse
- Melchior Wathelet Sr.

=== Alumni ===
- Henri de Brouckère (1801-1891), politician, former Prime Minister of Belgium
- Christine Defraigne (1962-), politician, regional member of parliament and senator
- Willy Demeyer (1959-), politician, Mayor of Liège
- Édouard Ducpétiaux (1804-1868), journalist
- Walthère Frère-Orban (1812-1896), politician, former Prime Minister of Belgium
- Jean Gol (1942-1995), politician
- Pierre Harmel (1911-2009), politician, former Prime Minister of Belgium
- Joseph Lebeau (1794-1865), politician, former Prime Minister of Belgium
- Edmond Leburton (1915-1997), politician, former Prime Minister of Belgium
- Charles Magnette (1863-1937), politician, former Speaker of the Senate
- Jules Malou (1810-1886), politician, former Prime Minister of Belgium
- Jean-Claude Marcourt (1956-), politician, minister and president of the Walloon Parliament
- Jean-Baptiste Nothomb (1805-1881), politician, former Prime Minister of Belgium
- Laurette Onkelinx (1958-), politician, federal minister
- Didier Reynders (1958), politician, federal minister
- Charles Rogier (1800-1885), politician, former Prime Minister of Belgium

== Publications ==
The faculty publishes the Journal of the Faculty of Law of the University of Liège (French: Revue de la faculté de droit de l'université de Liège), formerly known as Annales de la faculté de droit, and later Actualités du droit.
