= Faculty of Engineering of the University of Mons =

Coordinates: 50°27′07″N 3°57′09″E

- Type: Faculty of engineering
- Established: 1837; 189 years ago
- Location: Mons, Hainaut, Belgium
- Website: https://web.umons.ac.be/fpms

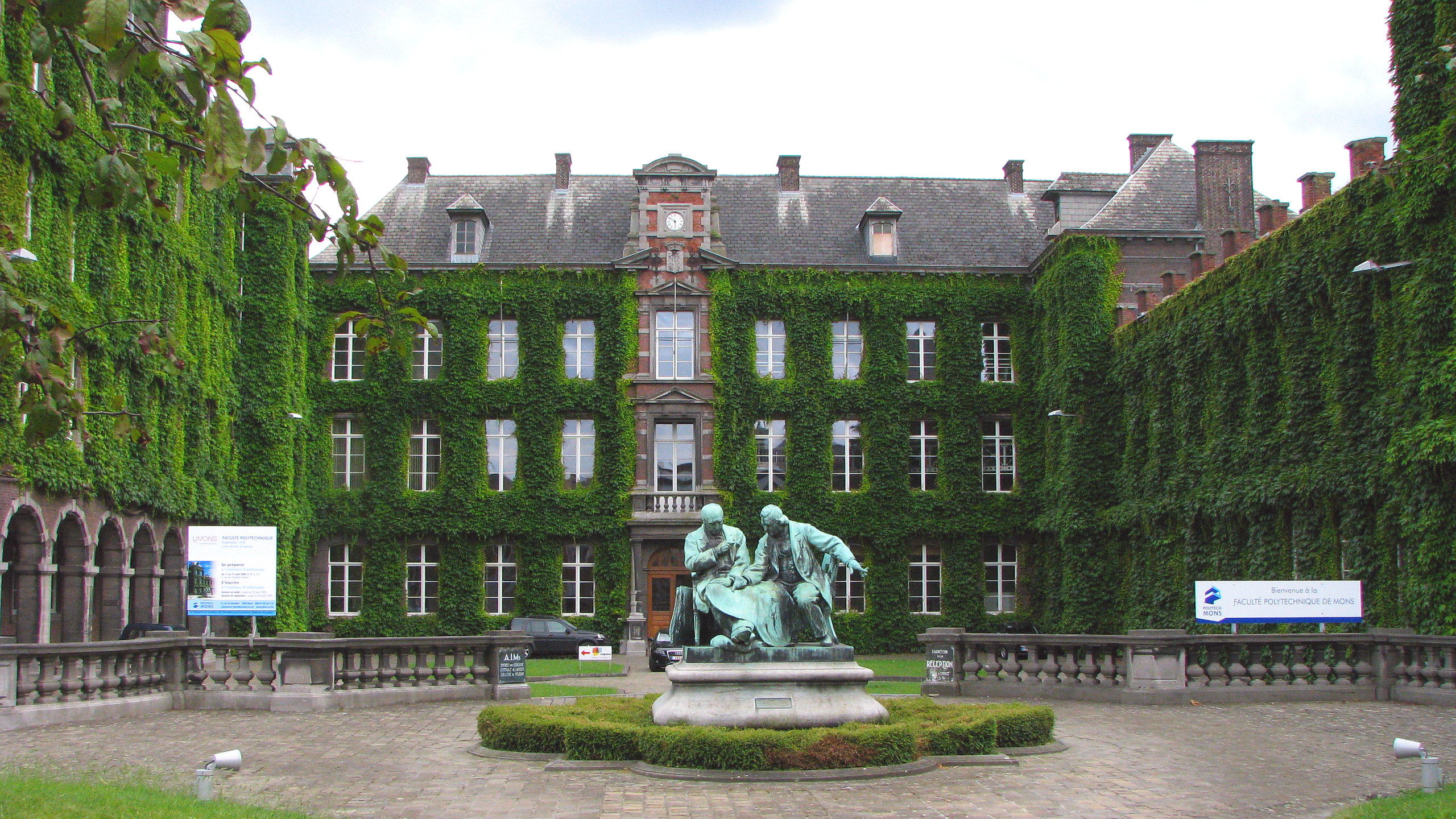
Université de Mons, first building of the Faculté Polytechnique de Mons (building formerly Collège de Houdain of 1587)

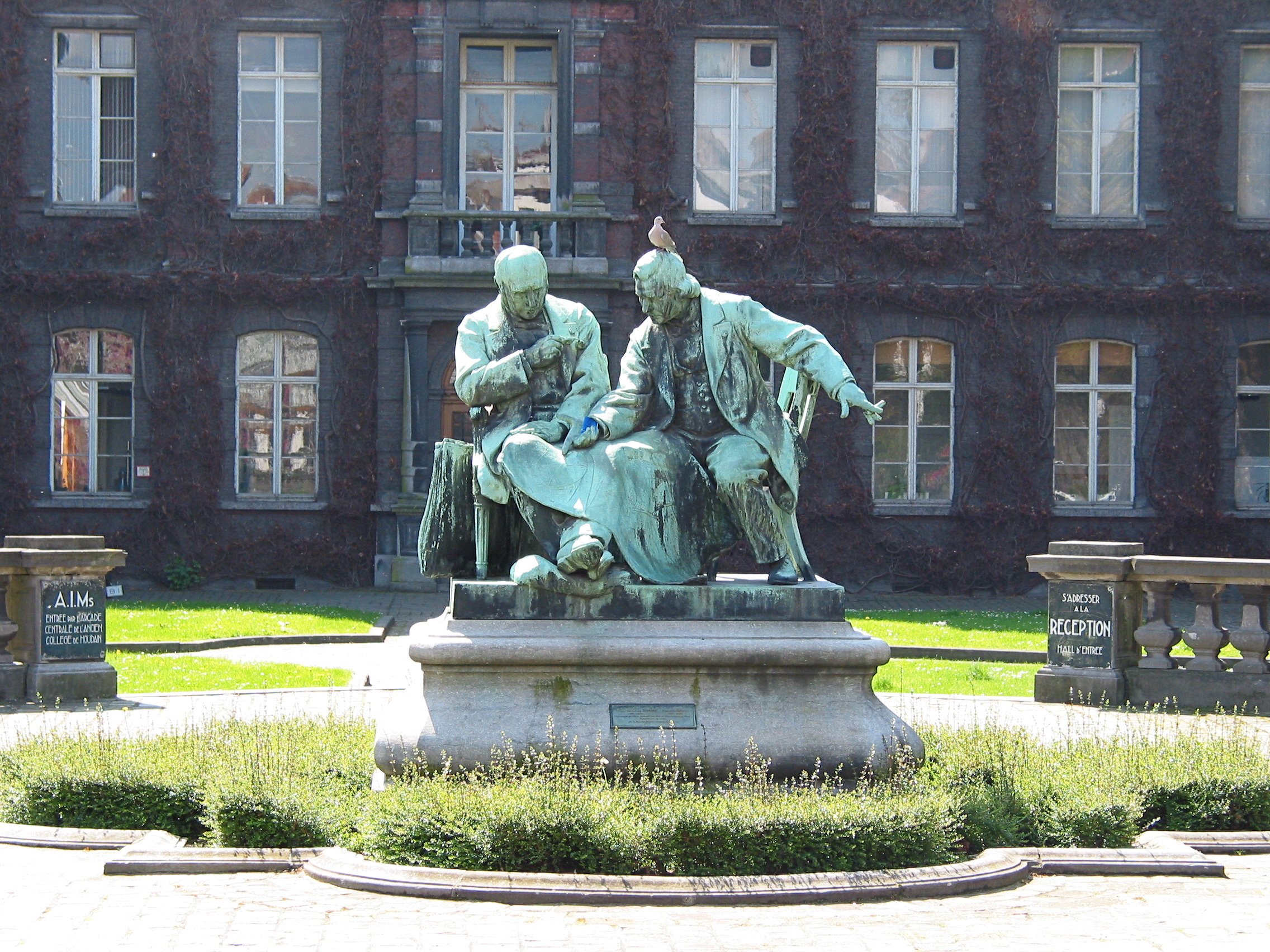
Ancient buildings of the FPMs (Faculté polytechnique de Mons) and statue of the founder, rue de Houdain.

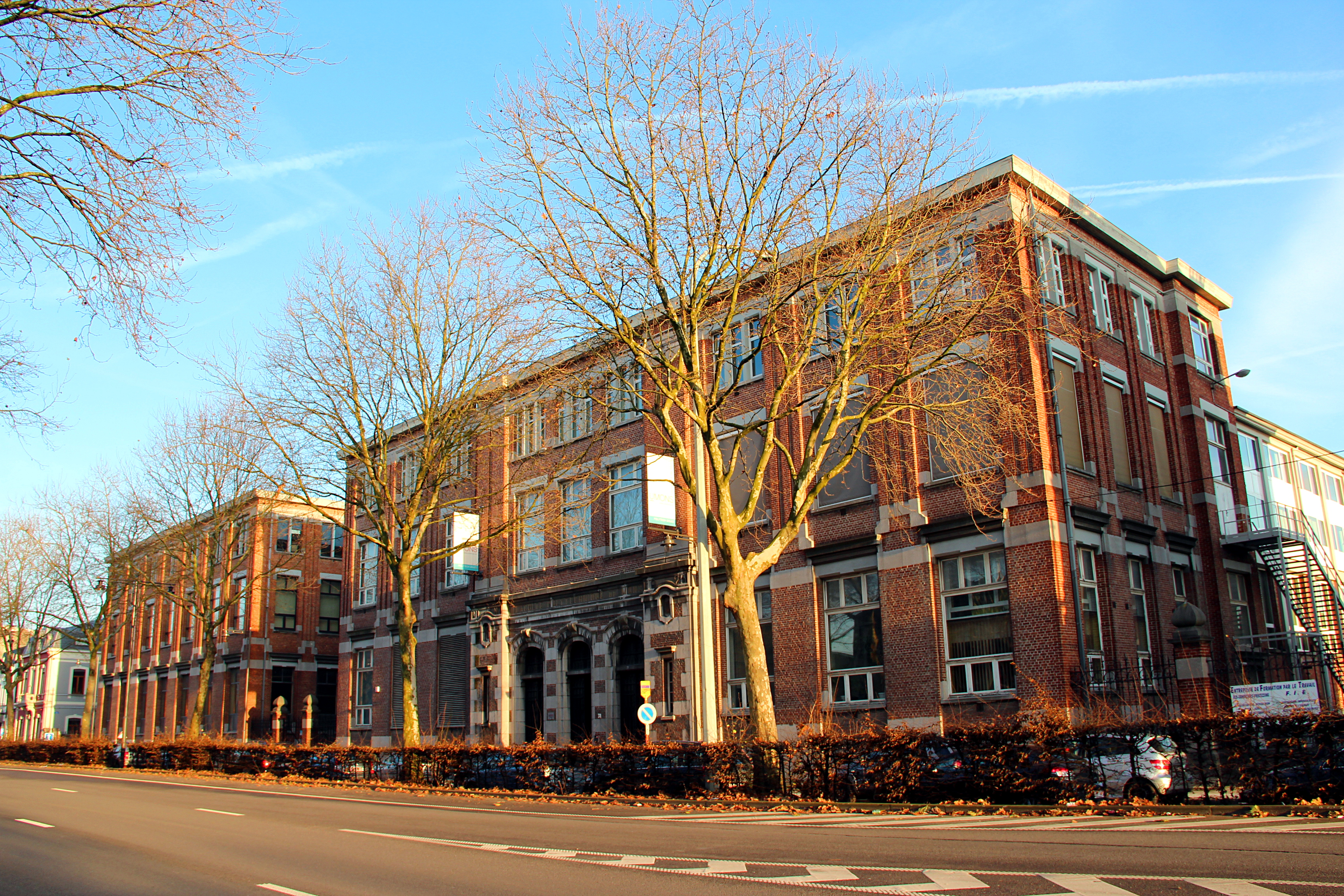
Buildings of the FPMs, Boulevard Dolez.

The Faculty of Engineering of the University of Mons (French: Faculté Polytechnique de Mons, pronounced [fakylte pɔlitɛknik də mɔ̃s]) is a faculty of engineering at the University of Mons in the Wallonia region in Belgium.

Before the 2009 merger of the Faculté Polytechnique de Mons and the University of Mons-Hainaut, the FPMs was the oldest university of the city of Mons and the first civil Engineering school in Belgium (1836). Its first name was École des Mines (Mining School). It is a member of the Top Industrial Managers for Europe (TIME) network, an association of 50 leading engineering schools and faculties in Europe. On 1 January 2009 the Engineering Faculty of Mons and the University of Mons-Hainaut merged into a new university called the University of Mons (UMons).

The Faculty organizes a five-year course and delivers the Engineering (Ir.) and Master of Science (MSc.) degree. An Applied Sciences Doctoral degree (Dr.) is also available at the FPMs.

== Teaching ==
As of 2005 there were 1200 students at the faculty, with 170 diplomas issued per year. Diplomas offered at the faculty include:

- BSc. in engineering
- MSc. in engineering (Architecture, Chemistry, Electricity, Computer Science and Management, Mechanics, Mining and Geology).
- Dr. in Applied Sciences

== Research ==
Research teams at the faculty work in 25 laboratories over four research centres: Multitel, Materia Nova, Inisma, and CETIC.

== International partnerships ==
The faculty has 50 Erasmus partners, and 25 direct partnerships with foreign universities. It is a member of the TIME network, and offers double degrees with institutes including:

- Technische Universität Wien
- Ecole Centrale de Lille
- Ecole Centrale de Lyon
- Ecole Centrale de Marseille
- Ecole Centrale de Nantes
- École nationale supérieure de l'aéronautique et de l'espace
- École supérieure d'électricité
- Politecnico di Milano
- Universidad Politécnica de Madrid

== See also ==
- Science and technology in Wallonia
- University Foundation
- Initialis Science Park
- Science Parks of Wallonia
