= Louvain-la-Neuve Science Park =

Created in 1971, Louvain-la-Neuve Science Park is the first of its kind in Belgium and is the largest in Wallonia (the French-speaking part of Belgium). It covers 231 hectares spread over the area of the municipality of Ottignies-Louvain-la-Neuve and the municipality of Mont-Saint-Guibert (30 km away from Brussels).

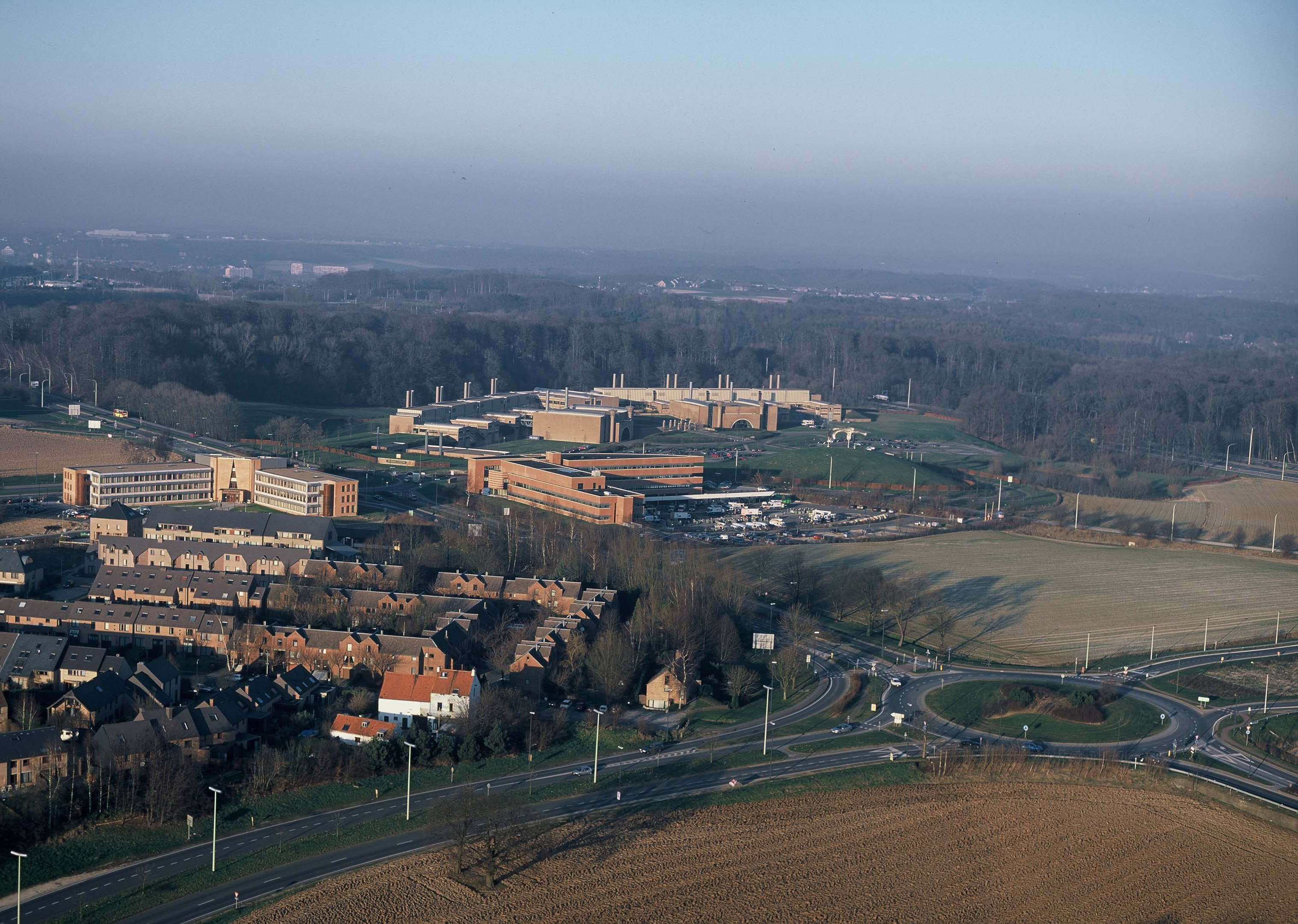
Louvain-la-Neuve Science Park, aerial view

From the outset, the objectives pursued by the development of Louvain-la-Neuve Science Park were to develop cooperation between industry and the University of Louvain (UCLouvain) and to contribute to regional economic development. Particular emphasis is placed on environmental-friendliness, as well as the quality of the premises and their surroundings.

The main areas of activity are:

- Life sciences
- Fine chemistry
- Information technologies
- Engineering

Louvain-la-Neuve Science Park is now home to more than 135 innovative companies and their 4,500 employees, one business incubator and five business centres.

== See also ==
- Louvain-la-Neuve
- Science Parks of Wallonia
- Université catholique de Louvain (UCLouvain)
