= HEC Liège Management School =

College and graduate school of the University of Liège, France

HEC Liège (Management School - University of Liège)
- HEC Liège - École de gestion de l'Université de Liège
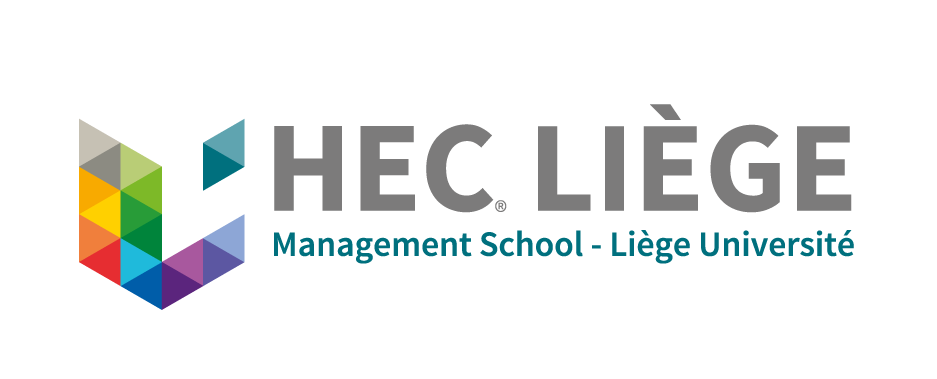
- Former names: HEC-ULg (2005); Hautes études commerciales (1898) & Faculty of Economics & Business
- Motto: The spirit of Management: entrepreneurship & innovation
- Type: School of business, economics & finance
- Established: 1898 / 2005
- Rector: Pr. Anne Sophie Nyssen
- Dean: Wilfried Niessen
- Secretary: Jacques Defer
- Administrative staff: More than 200 professors & lecturers/searchers
- Students: 3000
- Location: City centre, Liège/Sart-Tilman, Angleur
- Colours: Grey & ULiège teal blue
- Website: http://www.hec.uliege.be

HEC Liège Management School - University of Liège (in French, HEC Liège - École de gestion de l'Université de Liège and shortened as HEC Liège) is the college and graduate school of the University of Liège in the fields of economics, finance, business administration, entrepreneurship and engineering management (business IT management, management science, operational research & business process engineering).

The Liège university school of business & economics also covers, among other things, public economics & public finance, accounting & tax, insurance & actuarial science, international business & economics, marketing, a wide range of foreign languages, information management systems, e-commerce, real estate, corporate finance, environmental-green-&-ecological management, portfolio administration, financial risk engineering & asset management, industrial economics, sport & leisure business management, financial markets & banking, leadership, tourismanagement, entrepreneurship, operations & production management, applied sciences & technological management, corporate strategy & governance, econometrics, supply chain management & logistics, stock market analysis, HR management, ICT & business computing, digital marketing & e-business as well as not-for-profit & social development management.

The foreign languages taught are French, English, Dutch, German, Spanish, Italian, Portuguese, Japanese and Chinese. The school counts about 2.500 students among all of its programmes.

HEC Liège delivers diplomas such as BS, Master, MA, MS, MBAs, MPAs, MPhil, PhD as well as executive education diplomas (specialized complementary master's degrees) and teaching licenses of economics & business.

NB: In Belgium, universities offer academic programmes in Business Engineering. These studies are combining business administration, finance, economics with mathematics, statistics, sciences (physics, chemistry), management science and technologies for the main but also computer science as well as social science (ethics and law) and foreign languages. They are composed of a Bachelor of Science (B.S.; 3-year track) and followed by a master's degree (M.S.) leading to the title of "Business Engineer" ("Ingénieur de gestion" in French/ "Wirtschaftsingenieur" in German / "Handelsingenieur" in Dutch / "Ingegnere Gestionale" in Italian). Graduates are granted at the end of the five (or more) years a diploma of "Master of Science in Business Engineering".

HEC Liège is a member of both the AACSB and the EFMD. In 2011, the school received the EPAS accreditation from the EFMD for its MS in Management and PhD programmes.

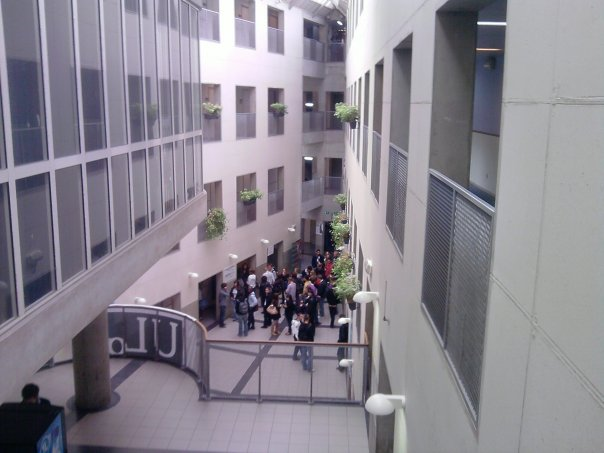
HEC Liège, city-centre building, the main hall

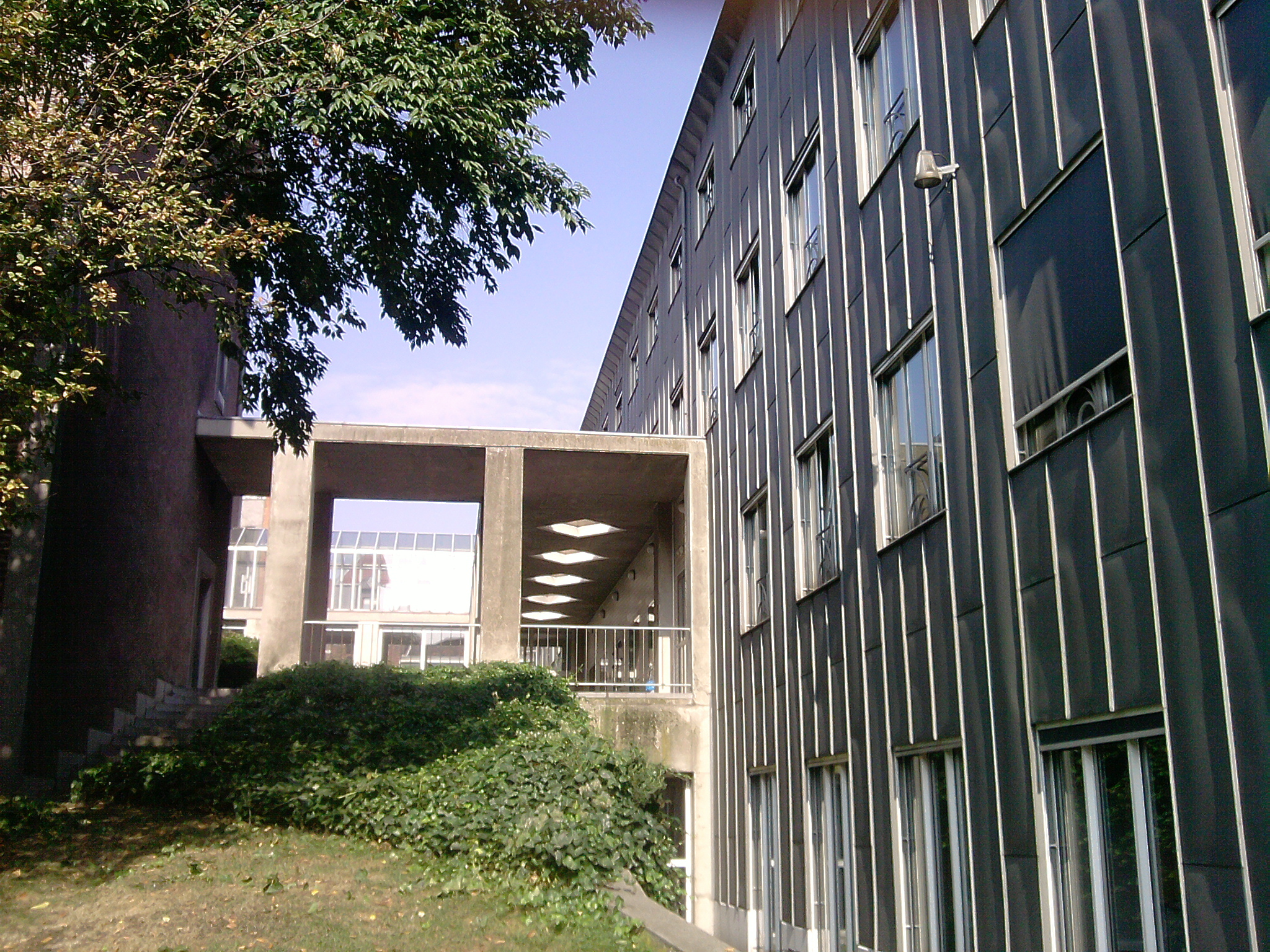
HEC Liège, city-center campus, outside the main building

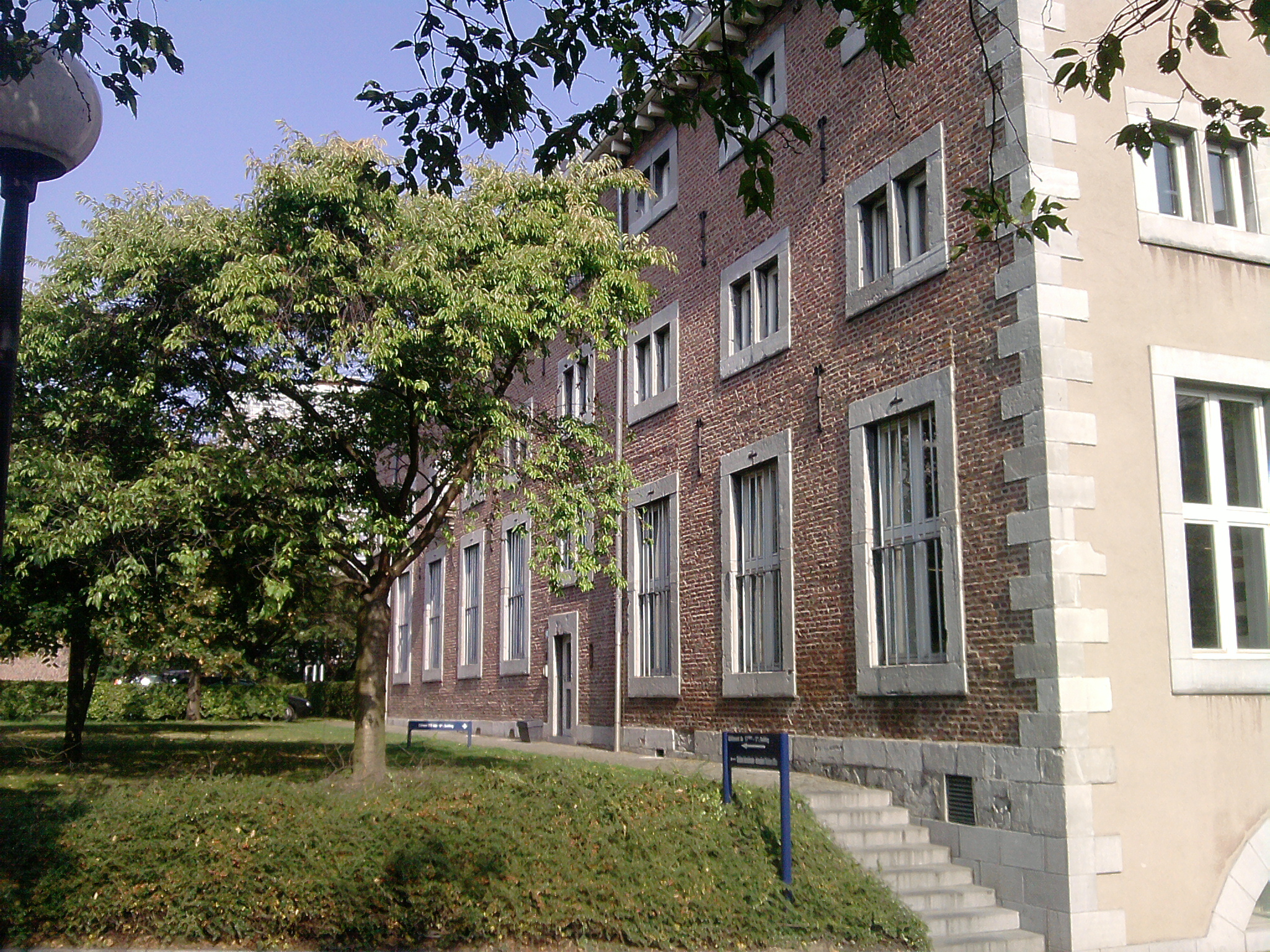
HEC Liège, city-center campus, the former nuns' building

HEC Liège, former logotype branded as "HEC-ULg"

HEC Liège, logotype before 2018

== Programmes ==
HEC Liège delivers following degrees:

=== Undergraduate - Bachelor of Science ===
- BS in Economics & Management (3 years / 180ECTS)
- BS in Business engineering (3 years / 180ECTS)
- Undergraduate bridge-year in Business Management (1 year / 60ECTS) for Bachelors of Commerce (B.Com. in Intl Business, Accounting, Marketing, Management Assistant, Insurance & Risk Management, e-Business, etc.)

=== Graduate - Master's degree ===
- Master in Business Management (1 year / 60ECTS)
- Master in International Management (1 year / 60ECTS / full-English taught)
- Master in European Public Administration (1 year / 60ECTS / with IFAG Bulgaria)
- Master in Economics (1 year / 60ECTS)

=== Sales - Part-time Master's degree ===
- Master in Sales Management (forthcoming from 2019-20 / 2 years / 120ECTS)

=== Management - Master of Science ===
- MS in Marketing & Strategic Intelligence (2 years / 120 ECTS)
- MS in Digital Marketing & Sales Management (2 years / 120 ECTS)
- MS in Management of Social Entreprises (2 years / 120 ECTS)
- "HEC Liège Entrepreneurs" programme - MS in Entrepreneurship (2 years / 120 ECTS)
- MS in General Management (2 years / 120 ECTS / part-time)

Dual Master of Law & Business:

- MS in Management / LL.M. (Master of Laws) - Double degree in law and business administration (along with the ULiège Faculty of Law, Political Science and Criminology; 3 years / 180 ECTS)

Dual Master "MOST":

- MS in Management / MA in HR Management & Organization - Double degree HEC Liège / Faculty of Social Science - "Management des Systèmes Organisationnels en Transition" (forthcoming from Sept. 2019-20 / 3years / 183 ECTS)

=== Finance - Master of Science ===
- MS in Banking & Asset Management (2 years / 120ECTS)
- MS in Financial Analysis & Audit (2 years / 120ECTS)
- MS in Financial Engineering (2 years / 120ECTS)
- MS in Sustainable Performance Management, Systems & Control (2 years / 120ECTS)

=== Business Engineering - Master of Science ===
- MS in Financial Engineering (2 years / 120ECTS)
- MS in Supply Chain Management & Business Analytics (2 years / 120ECTS)
- MS in Intrapreneurship & Management of Innovation Projects (2 years / 120ECTS)

Dual Masters of "Industrial & Business Engineering":

- MS in Industrial & Business Engineering - Double degree "HEC Liège / HELMo Gramme - Ingénieur industriel & de gestion" (from Sept. 2016-17 / 3years / 183ECTS)

Dual Masters of "Digital Business":

- MS in Computer Science & Business Engineering - Double degree "Sciences informatiques & Ingénieur de gestion HEC Liège" (from September 2017-18 / 3 years / 180ECTS)
- MS in Information Technology & Business Engineering - Double degree "Ingénieur civil en informatique & Ingénieur de gestion HEC Liège" (from September 2017-18 / 3 years / 183ECTS)

=== Financial economics - Master of Science ===
- MS in Macroeconomics & Finance (2 years / 120ECTS)

=== Economics - Master of Arts ===
- MA in Economics & Society: Economics of Political & Social Issues (2 years / 120ECTS)
- MA in Economics & Society: Competition & Innovation (2 years / 120ECTS)

Advanced Master of Arts:

- MA in Social Economics (1year / 60ECTS - joint degree with UCLouvain - FOPES)

=== Human Resources - Master of Arts ===
- MA in Human Resource Management (2 years / 120ECTS - joint degree with the ULiège Faculty of Social Science)

Dual Master "MOST":

- MS in Management / MA in HR Management & Organization - double degree HEC Liège / Faculty of Social Science - "Management des Systèmes Organisationnels en Transition" (from Sept. 2019-20 / 3 years / 183ECTS)

=== MBA - Master of Business Administration ===
- Executive Master of Business Administration - OpenBorders MBA (2 years / 120ECTS)

=== MPA - Master of Public Administration ===
- MPA / MS in Management: European public management (2 years / 120ECTS - joint degree with the ULiège Faculty of Law & Political Science)

=== Teaching - Master of Education in Economics & Business ===
- M.Ed. / Master in Management - high school teaching certificate (finalité didactique, AESS groupe sciences de gestion) (2 years / 120ECTS)
- M.Ed. / Master in Economics - high School teaching certificate (finalité didactique, AESS groupe sciences économiques) (2 years / 120ECTS)
- M.Ed. in Economics, Applied Economics & Business Administration - high school teaching certificate (AESS Sc. économiques et sc. de gestion) (1 year / 30ECTS)
- M.Ed. - higher education, university and college teaching ability (CAPAES)

=== HEC Liege Executive School - post-graduate, advanced and part-time degrees ===
- Undergraduate bridge-year in Business Management (2 years / 60ECTS / part-time, evening classes)
- Master in Business Management (1 year / 60ECTS / part-time, evening classes)
- MS in General Management (2 years / 120ECTS / part-time, evening classes)
- OpenBorders MBA (2 years / 120ECTS / along with FH Aachen & the University of Hasselt)
- "HEC Liège Entrepreneurs" programme (for graduates in other disciplines than business/finance/economics) - Advanced Master of Entrepreneurship (1 year / 60ECTS)
- Advanced MS in Financial Engineering & Risk Management (1 year / 60ECTS / part-time, evening classes)
- Advanced MS in Audit, Control & Financial Accounting (1 year / 60ECTS / part-time, evening classes)
- Advanced MA / LL.M. in Fiscal Law (1 year / 60ECTS / joined degree with the ULg Faculty of Law & Political Science)
- Online Executive Master in Management (2 years / 60ECTS / along with the Solvay Brussels School of Economics and Management - ULB and the Louvain School of Management - UCL)
- Joint special Master in Environmental Management (with ISIL Polytechnic College, Haute Ecole de la Province de Liège)
- Certificates in Management Science, Finance, Analysis/Control/Audit and Fiscal Law

=== PHD - Master of Philosophy and doctoral programmes ===
- MPhil & PhD in Economics & Management (minimum 3 years / 180ECTS):
  - Pure Economics track
  - Applied Economical Analysis track
  - Political Economics track
  - Public Administration track
  - International Management track
  - E-Business with Digital Marketing Strategy
  - Econometrics and Operational Research track
  - Entrepreneurship track
  - Finance track
  - Marketing track
  - Accounting & Tax track
  - Business Law track
  - Corporate Strategy and Top-management Governance track
  - Operations, Supply Chain Management & Logistics track
  - HR Management track
  - IT Management & Digital Business track

== History ==
The Liège University School of Management (HEC Liège, formerly known as HEC-ULg) was created in 2005 by the merger of Hautes Etudes Commerciales de Liège (HEC-Liège), a private institute, created in 1898 and the Economics and Business Administration Departments (le Département d'économie et l'Ecole d'Administration des Affaires) of the University of Liège.
