= Soumia Fahd =

Moroccan herpetologist

- Born: 1960 (age 65–66)
- Education: University of Mons; Mohammed V University
- Occupation: Biology professor

Soumia Fahd is a Moroccan herpetologist at Abdelmalek Essaâdi University in Tétouan.

== Life and work ==
In high school, Fahd studied experimental sciences. For her BSc, she studied Industrial Engineering at the University of Mons (Belgium). She then returned to Morocco to study biology at the Mohammed V University and continued her education at the Faculty of Sciences of Tetouan, earning a degree in animal biology in 1986. Fahd initially joined the Faculty of Sciences of Tetouan in 1986 as an assistant. She is a full professor at that university where she heads the Laboratory of Ecology, Systematics, Biodiversity Conservation, which she founded in 2012.

For three decades, she has been dedicated to studying amphibians and reptiles. In 2008, a Moroccan insect, Clonopsis soumiae was named in her honour, as she hosted the research group collecting, breeding and analysing the Clonopsis insects in Morocco. Dr. Fahd has organized several academic conferences, such as the Biology of the Vipers Conference in 2017.

Since 2015, she is part of a network of Mediterranean women scientists.

== Awards and honors ==
2008: Clonopsis soumiae was named in her honour

2019: She won a Research Excellence Award for Morocco's Best Researcher Award

== Selected publications ==
- Santos X, Brito JC, Sillero N, Pleguezuelos JM, Llorente GA, Fahd S, Parellada X (2006). "Inferring habitat-suitability areas with ecological modelling techniques and GIS: a contribution to assess the conservation status of Vipera latastei ". Biological Conservation 130 (3): 416–425.
- Fahd S, Mediani M (2007). "Herpetofaune du bassin versant de Oued Laou ". Wadi 6 FP, INCO-CT2005, 15226. (in French).
- Velo-Antón G, el Marnisi B, Fritz U, Fahd S (2015)." Distribution and conservation status of Emys orbicularis in Morocco." Vertebrate Zoology 65 (1): 131–134.
- Nicolas V, Mataame A, Crochet PA, Geniez P, Fahd S, Ohler A (2018). "Phylogeography and ecological niche modeling unravel the evolutionary history of the African green toad, Bufotes boulengeri boulengeri (Amphibia: Bufonidae), through the Quaternary". Journal of Zoological Systematics and Evolutionary Research 56 (1): 102–116.
- Chergui B, Fahd S, Santos X, Pausas JG (2018). "Socioeconomic factors drive fire-regime variability in the Mediterranean Basin". Ecosystems 21 (4): 619–628.
