= Shady Attia =

Egyptian-Belgian academic and architectural engineer

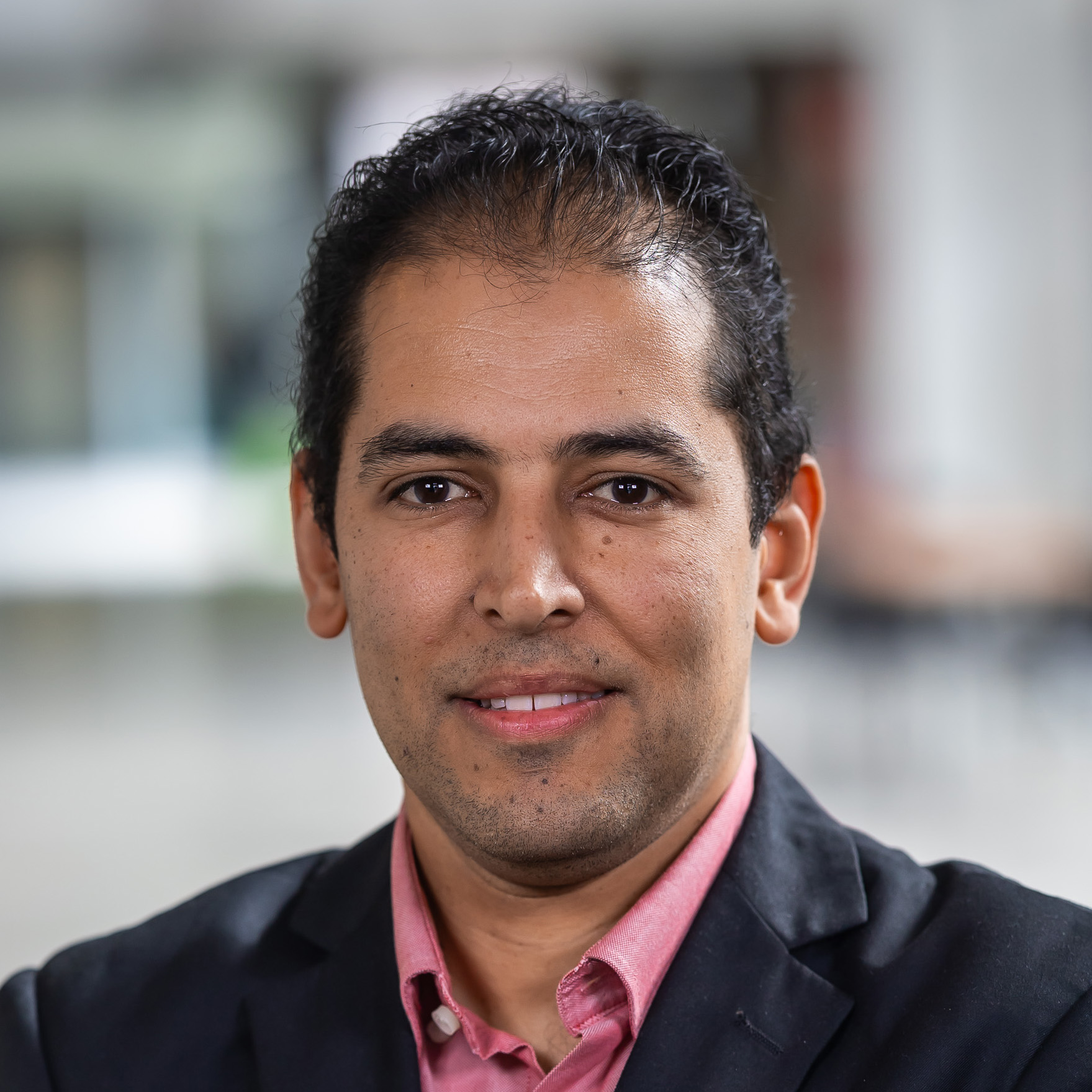
- Citizenship: Egyptian, Belgian
- Education: Helwan University, Wageningen University, UCLouvain
- Scientific career
- Fields: Sustainable architecture, Building performance simulation
- Workplaces: University of Liège
- Thesis: A Tool for Design Decision Making: Zero Energy Residential Buildings in Hot Humid Climates (2012)
- Website: https://www.shadyattia.org/

Shady Attia is an Egyptian-Belgian academic and architectural engineer. He is a professor of Sustainable Architecture and Building Technology at the University of Liège, where he leads the Laboratory of Sustainable Building Design.

== Education ==
Attia completed his undergraduate studies in architectural engineering at the Faculty of Fine Arts at Helwan University in 2002. He then pursued a Master of Science in Landscape Design and Urban Planning at Wageningen University, specializing in urban climate. In 2009, he began a PhD in building physics at Texas A&M University and later completed it at UCLouvain, where his research focused on zero-energy buildings, later worked as a Postdoctoral Fellow at the Swiss Federal Institute of Technology Lausanne.

== Career ==
He began his career in 2014 and joined the University of Liège's School of Engineering as a faculty member, becoming an associate professor in 2016 and a Full Professor in 2020. He has authored more than 120 peer-reviewed journal articles and over 100 conference papers, books, and technical reports. He is actively involved with the International Building Performance Simulation Association (IBPSA) and several International Energy Agency (IEA) committees. He is an active member of different ISO committees representing the Belgian Bureau of Normalization with a focus on Circular Economy in the Construction Sector.

He is also a member of the Society of Building Science Educators and co-founder of the Doctoral Seminar for Sustainability in the Built Environment in Belgium.

Attia is ranked among the top 2% of scientists globally by Stanford University, and his book Regenerative and Positive Impact Architecture has been widely used and recognized for its relevance to the United Nations Sustainable Development Goals (SDGs).

== Publications ==
- Attia, S. (2018). Regenerative and Positive Impact Architecture: Learning from Case Studies. Springer International Publishing. ISBN 978-3-319-66717-1.
- Attia, S. (2018). Net Zero Energy Buildings (NZEB): Concepts, Frameworks, and Roadmap for Project Analysis and Implementation. Elsevier. ISBN 978-0128124611

== Accolades ==
He has received recognition for his contributions in solar energy and architectural design, including the Best Paper Award for "Sizing Photovoltaic Systems During Early Design: A Decision Tool For Architects" and the SBSE ASES Solar Conference Scholarship at ASES Solar 2010 in Phoenix, AZ. He also received the ASES Best Paper Award at the same conference.
