= Philippe Devaux =

Belgian philosopher and logician (1902–1979)

Philippe Devaux (1902–1979) was a French-speaking Belgian philosopher and logician, professor at the University of Liège. Through his numerous works and translations (he was the translator and friend of Bertrand Russell), he played a great part in the development of analytic philosophy in French-speaking countries.

After a first study devoted to the philosophy of Samuel Alexander in 1929, Philippe Devaux was appointed as a FNRS research associate in Belgium, and then for two-year as an advanced fellow at the University of California, Berkeley and Harvard University, where he studied with Alfred North Whitehead. After becoming professor at the University of Liège, he also taught at the universities of Brussels, Manchester, Hull and London. Paul Gochet was his student and assistant in Liège.

== Bibliography ==
=== Personal Works ===
- Le Système d'Alexander : Exposé critique d'une théorie néo-réaliste du changement, Vrin, 1929.
- Bertrand Russell ou la Paix dans la Vérité, Paris, Seghers, 1967.
- De Thalès à Bergson : Introduction historique à la Philosophie européenne, Liège, Sciences et Lettres, 1949.
- La cosmologie de Whitehead, tome I : L'Epistémologie whiteheadienne, Louvain-la-Neuve, Chromatika, 2007.

=== French Translations ===
- A. N. Whitehead, Le Devenir de la religion.
- A. N. Whitehead, La Fonction de la raison et autres essais.
- B. Russell, La Méthode scientifique en philosophie : notre connaissance du monde extérieur.
- B. Russell, Signification et vérité.
- B. Russell, L’analyse de la matière.
- B. Russell, De la dénotation, l'âge de la science.
- (with N. Thyssen-Rutten) K. Popper, La logique de la découverte scientifique.
