= University of Mons-Hainaut =

Coordinates: 50°27′33″N 3°57′1″E

The University of Mons-Hainaut (French: Université de Mons-Hainaut, pronounced [ynivɛʁsite də mɔ̃s ɛno], UMH), in Mons, Wallonia, Belgium, was a university in the French Community of Belgium. Its official language was French.

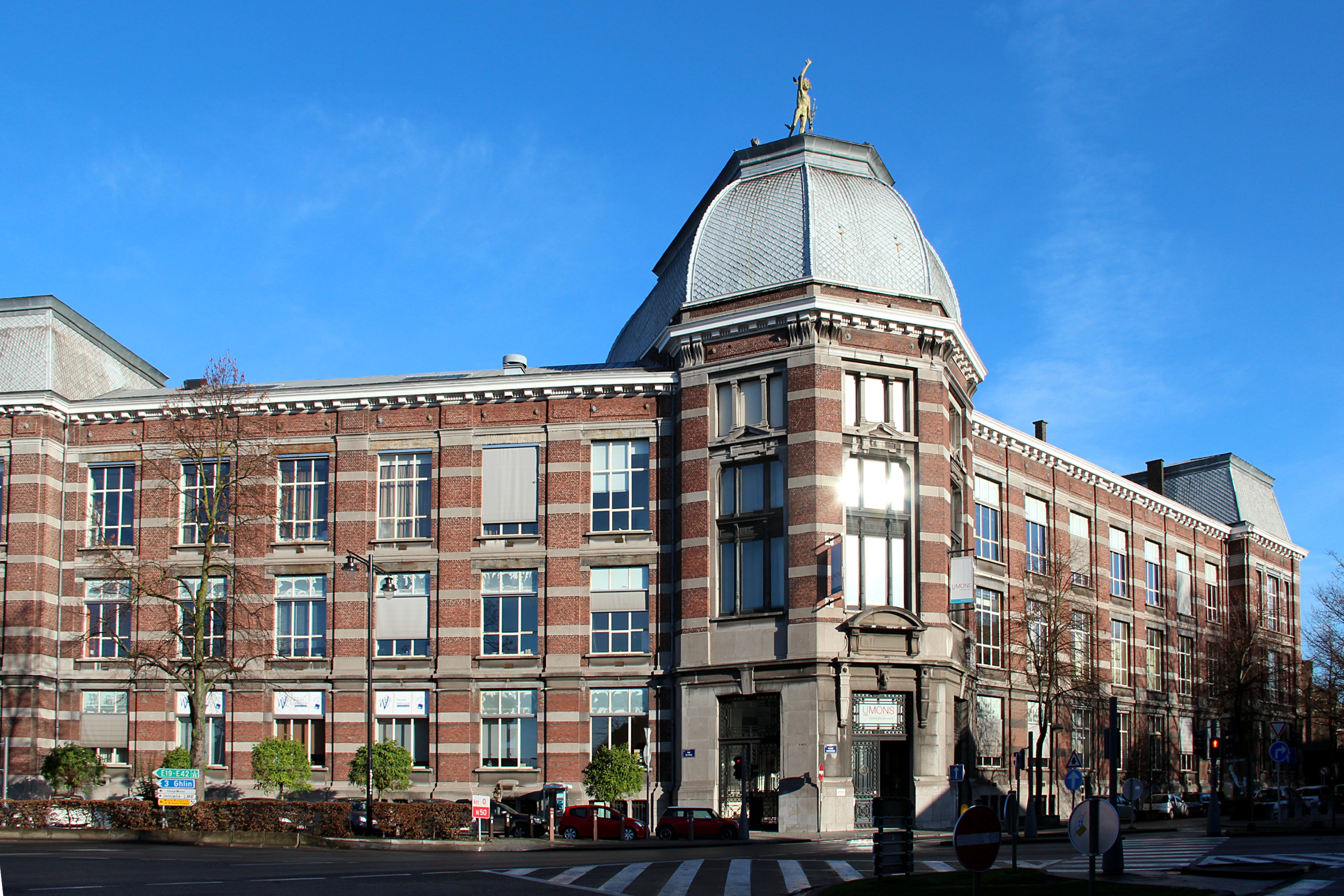
University of Mons.

From January 1, 2009, the University of Mons-Hainaut and the Engineering Faculty of Mons Faculté polytechnique de Mons fused in a new university simply called the University of Mons.

== History ==
The University of Mons-Hainaut was established in 1965 from the Institut commercial des industriels du Hainaut, which had been founded in 1899 by Raoul Warocqué. In the university library, which was established in 1797, there were more than 715,000 items, including 450 manuscripts, one of which was from the 10th century, and 140 incunables, of which one was a Gutenberg Bible.

== Notable alumni ==
- Elio Di Rupo, chemist, politician, and former prime minister of Belgium.

== See also ==
- Science and technology in Wallonia
- Initialis Science Park

== Sources ==
- Université de Mons-Hainaut
