= Liège Science Park =

Coordinates: 50.599°N 5.566°E

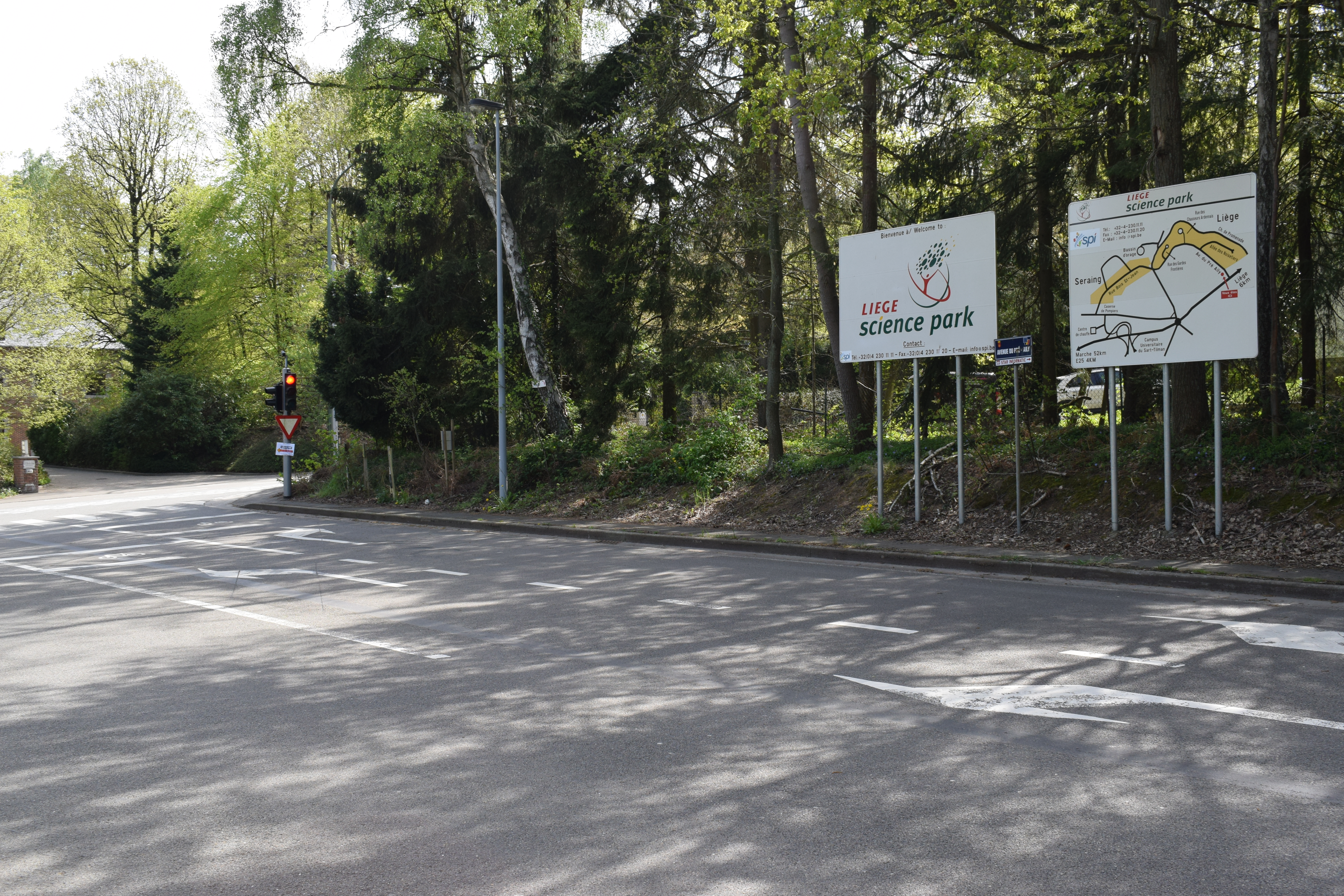

Liège Science Park is a business incubator and science park of the University of Liège and is located on the territories of the municipalities of Seraing and Liège in Belgium.

== History ==
In 1953, Marcel Dubuisson, the new president of the University of Liège supported the idea of creating a new type of campus, based on what he had seen during a stay at Harvard University in 1936. The campus should combine all the university services: libraries, accommodation units, sports facilities, the restaurants and the companies linked to the Alma Mater. Marcel Dubuisson together with Pierre Clerdent (Governor of the Province of Liège) drafted a plan for a site outside the city of more than 10 square kilometres of land. The Sart Tilman site would become the new location for all the activities of the University of Liège.

In 1971, the Belgian Committee of Ministers for the economic and social cooperation created the science park which is located on both the municipality of Liège (Sart Tilman) and the municipality of Seraing (Cense rouge). In February 1975 the first company, IBM, settled on the science park. The site would be developed with the cooperation of three partners: SPI+, the Company-University Interface of Liège and the municipality of Seraing. Besides academic research, biotechnology, electronics, space and engineering. In 2003, the scientific park was named Liège Science Park as part of project which promotes the development of high-potential economic activities together with a closer cooperation between high-tech companies and research labs.

== See also ==
- BioLiège
- Science Parks of Wallonia

== Sources ==
- Liège Science Park
- SPI+
- Liège region
