= Paul Gochet =

Belgian logician, philosopher, and emeritus professor (1932-2011)

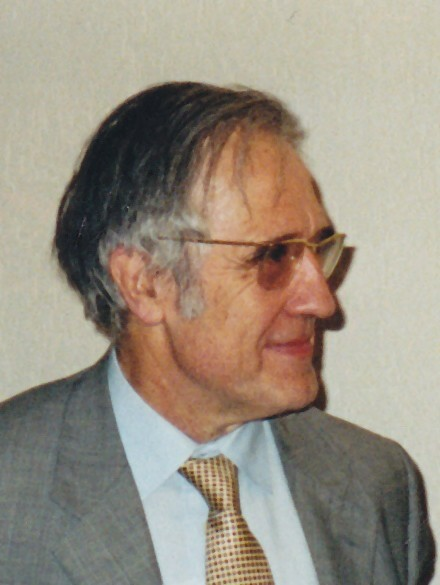
Paul Gochet in April 2000

Paul Gochet (21 March 1932 – 21 June 2011) was a Belgian logician, philosopher, and emeritus professor of the University of Liège. His research was mainly in the fields of logic and analytic philosophy. He is perhaps best known for his works on Quine's philosophy.

== Biography ==
Paul Gochet was born in Bressoux near Liège. He graduated from the University of Brussels (ULB) with degrees in Romance philology in 1954 and philosophy in 1959. In between his studies, he spent a year in England attending the courses of A. Ayer at University College London (1957) and J. L. Austin at Oxford in 1958. He received his PhD from the University of Liege in 1968, where he had been an assistant since 1962.

After studying in Liège with Philippe Devaux, a translator and friend of Russell, and later in 1971 at Harvard University, he was appointed an ordinary professor at the University of Liège in 1972. There, he taught logic and English-language philosophy. He was a Research Fellow at Stanford and Berkeley universities from 1974 to 1975, an invited professor at the Collège de France in 1981, Research Fellow at the Research School of Social Sciences in Canberra in 1984, and holder of the Francqui Chair at the University of Ghent in 1988. He maintained a long-standing connection with the Belgian National Centre for Research in Logic that was founded in 1955 by R. Feys, Ch. Perelman, A. Borgers, A. Bayart, PhDevaux, and others, which maintained close connections with E. W. Beth and other logicians in The Netherlands. He was an emeritus professor at the University of Liège from 1997 until 2011. He was Commandeur de l'Ordre de la Couronne and Grand Officier de l'Ordre de Léopold II. He was a member of both the Royal Academy of Belgium and the International Institute of Philosophy.

Gochet's interests concerned language, logic, and knowledge. He first graduated with a thesis on poetry, then worked on the logical theory of the proposition in the analytical tradition. With a few others, he was responsible for introducing analytic philosophy to the French-speaking community. From philosophy, he widened his investigations to the formal semantics of natural language that required an expertise in linguistics as well as in modal and intensional logics. Later on, Gochet shifted naturally with the trend toward applications in computer science and artificial intelligence. In particular, this led to his long-standing interest in epistemic logic. His decades-long involvement with the European community in logic, language, and computation, made him a widely known international presence. As such, he was a constant visitor at the Amsterdam Colloquia in formal semantics, and the European ESSLLI Summer Schools in Logic, Language and Information.

== Principal professional activities ==
1. Visitor, Philosophy Department, Harvard University, six weeks, F. N. R. S. scholarship May–June 1971.
2. Research Fellow of the American Council of Learned Societies, Stanford University and the University of California, Berkeley 1974–1975.
3. Invited Professor to the Collège de France, December 1981.
4. Research Fellow, National University of Australia, Canberra (Research School of Social Sciences), three months 1984.
5. Francqui Chair at the University of Gand, 1988.
6. Research Fellow, National University of Australia, Canberra (Automated Reasoning Project) three months in 1995.
7. Visiting professor, University of Puerto-Rico, March 2001.
8. Guest Researcher: three weeks at the Universities of Tsukuba and Shizuoka (Japan), November–December 2003.
9. Speaker at the "Conférences Pierre Duhem", Paris, Inaugural Session, April 2006.

== Memberships ==
Gochet was a member of the following organizations:

- Member of the Académie Royale de Belgique
- Institut International de Philosophie
- Académie Internationale de Philosophie des Sciences
- Aristotelian Society (London)
- Centre National de Recherche de Logique
- Société belge de Logique et de Philosophie des Sciences
- Société belge de Philosophie
- Société de Philosophie de Louvain
- Société de Philosophie des Sciences (Paris)
- Honorary president of the Société de Philosophie Analytique de 1997–2003
- Honorary president of The European Association for Logic, Language and Information (Amsterdam)
- Co-director of Section at the Institut des Hautes de Belgique

== Editorial boards ==
Gochet served on the editorial boards of Dialectica, Grazer Philosophische Studien, Logique et Analyse, Philosophiques, and Revue internationale de Philosophie.

== Selected works ==
- Esquisse d'une théorie nominaliste de la proposition, Paris, Armand Colin, 1972
- Quine en perspective, Paris, Flammarion, 1978
- Outline of a Nominalist Theory of Propositions: an essay in the theory of meaning and in the philosophy of logic, Dordrecht, D. Reidel, 1980 (Note: This is a revised version (and translation) of Esquisse d'une théorie nominaliste de la proposition)
- Ascent to Truth: a critical examination of Quine's philosophy, Munich, Philosophia Verlag, 1986

=== With Pascal Gribomont ===
- Logique; vol. 1: Méthodes pour l'informatique fondamentale, Paris, Hermes, 1991
- Logique: vol. 2: Méthodes formelles pour l'étude des programmes, Paris, Hermes, 1994
- "Epistemic Logic", Handbook of the History of Logic, vol. 7, Twentieth Century Modalities, Dov Gabbay and John Woods (eds.), Amsterdam, Elsevier, 2006, 99–195

=== Selected translations ===
- Le Mot et La Chose, French transl. (with J. Dopp) of W. V. O. Quine, Word and Object, Paris, Flammarion, 1999 (2nd ed.)
- Le langage de la perception, French transl. (with B. Ambroise) of J. L. Austin, Sense and Sensibilia, Paris, Vrin, 2007 (2nd ed.) (Note: For a complete bibliography up to 1999, see Logique en perspective. Mélanges offerts à Paul Gochet, François Beets and Eric Gillet (éds.), Brussels, Ousia, 2000.)

=== Selected publications in logic ===
- "Contributions à Philippe Smets et al. (eds.)", Non-Standard Logics for Automated Reasoning, London, Academic Press, 1988
- "Intensional Logic and natural language" (with André Thayse) and "Semantics", From Modal Logic to Deductive Databases. Introducing a Logic Based Approach to Artificial Intelligence, Chichester, Wiley, 1989, André Thayse, et al. (eds.), 55–163
- "Méthodes pour l’intelligence artificielle" (with Pascal Gribomont and André Thayse), Logique, vol. 3, Paris, Hermès-Lavoisier, 2000
- "Model Theory and the Pragmatics of Indexicals", Dialectica, vol. 31, 1977, 389–408.
- "La logique du sens", Les languages, le sens et l'histoire, tome 1, Publication de l'Université de Lille III, 1977, 225–240
- "La sémantique récursive de Davidson et de Montague", Penser les mathématiques, Apery et al, Paris, Le Seuil, 1982, 72–87
- "Professor Weingartner's Contributions to Epistemic Logic" (with E. Gillet) Poznan Studies in the Philosophy of Sciences and the Humanities, vol. 24, G. Schurz and G. D. Dorn (eds.), 1992, 97–115
- "Le problème de l'omniscience logique", (with E. Gillet), Dialectica, 1993, 143–171
- "Quantified Modal Logic, Dynamic Semantics and S5", (with E. Gillet) Dialectica, 1999, 243–251
- "Quantifiers, Being, and Canonical Notation", A Companion to Philosophical Logic, D. Jacquette (ed.), Oxford, Blackwell, 2002, 265–280
- "Preface" in Michel Weber (ed.), After Whitehead: Rescher on Process Metaphysics, Frankfurt / Paris / Lancaster, ontos verlag, 2004, 11-32
- "The Dynamic Turn in Epistemic Logic", Knowledge and Belief, Wissen und Glauben W. Loffler and P. Weingartner, (eds.), Vienna, öbvethpt, 2004, 129–134
- "Hybrid Logic, its theoretical and practical significance", Proceedings of the 2003 MLG meeting at Shizuoka, Japan, 2004, 6–9
- "Senso comune e logica", A. Agazzi (ed.), Valore e Limiti del Senso Comune, Milan, FrancoAngeli, 2004, 243–259
- "Algorithms for Relevant Logic" (with Pascal Gribomont and Didier Rossetto), Logique et Analyse, 1995, 150-152 (Note: reprinted in Logic, Thought and Action, D. Vanderveken (ed.), Dordrecht, Springer, 2005, 479–496)
- "Formal Philosophy", Masses of Formal Philosophy, V. Hendricks and John Symons, (eds.), Automatic Press, 2006, 15–25
- "Intensional Logic", "Modal Logic", "Model-Theoretical Semantics", and "Possible World Semantics", Handbook or Pragmatics, J. Verschueren et al. (eds.), Amsterdam, John Benjamins, updated edition, 2007
- "Un problème ouvert en épistémologie: la formalisation du savoir-faire", Les conférences Pierre Duhem 2006, Th. Martin (ed.), Paris, Vuibert Sciences
- "La logique épistémique et le calcul des situations au service de l’Intelligence artificielle", Bulletin de l’Académie Royale de Belgique. Classe des Lettres et des Sciences morales et politiques, Brussels, 2007

=== Main publications devoted to analytic philosophy ===
- Quine zur Diskussion, Berlin, Ullstein, 1984
- "Denis Vernant et leurs collaborateurs, recension des ouvrages de philosophie anglo-saxonne du XIXe siècle et du XXe siècle" (with Jacques Riche), Encyclopédie Philosophique Universelel III, A. Jacob (ed.)
- Oeuvres Philosophiques, vol. 2 (with J. F. Mattéi), Paris, P. U. F., 1992
- "On Sir Alfred Ayer’s Theory of Truth", The Philosophy of Sir Alfred Ayer, E. Hahn (ed.), The Library of Living Philosophers, La Salle Open Court, 1992, 201–220
- L’empirisme relatif de Quine", La philosophie Anglo-saxonne Michel Meyer (ed.), Paris, Presses Universitaires de France, 1993
- "On Lauener's Open Transcendentalism" (with M. Kefer), Grazer Philosophische Studien, 1993, 139–153
- "Quine's Epistemology", Pragmatik, Handbuch Pragmatischen Denkens, H. Stakowiacz (ed.), Hamburg Felix Meiner Verlag, Band V, 1995, 123–143
- "Le Mot et La Chose, traduction du livre de W. V. O. Quine" (with Joseph Dopp), Word and Object, avec un avant-propos de P. Gochet, Paris, Flammarion, 1999
- "Relativité de l’ontologie et ontologie réaliste chez Quine. Comment les concilier?" Logique et Ontologie. Perspectives diachroniques et synchroniques. Liber amicorum in honorem Huberti Hubiani, François Beets and Marc-Antoine Gavray (eds.), Liège Presses Universitaires, 2005, 115–131
- "L’être selon Quine", Lire Quine. Logique et Ontologie, Jean-Maurice Monnoyer (ed.), Paris, Editions de l’éclat, 2006, 185–209
- "Qu’est-ce que la réalité? Les réponses de Quine et de H. Zwirn", Philosophia Scientiae, 10 (2), 2006, 23–39
- "Contribution à Philosophie de la physique", Dialogue à plusieurs voix autour de controverses contemporaines et classiques. Ouvrage dirigé par Léna Soler, Paris, L’Harmattan, 2006
- Le langage de la perception, traduction du livre de J. L. Austin, Sense and Sensibilia, avec une introduction, de B. Ambroise et S. Laugier et un avantpropos de Paul Gochet (with Bruno Ambroise), Paris, Vrin, 2007
- "Présentation de The Philosophy of Jaakko Hintikka", The Library of Living Philosophers, Diogène. 2008

=== Publications devoted to Belgian philosophy ===
- "Recent Developments of the Philosophy of Science in Belgium", Zeitschrift für Allgemeine Wissenschafts-theorie, vol. VI', 1975, 145–163, 182–186
- "Notice sur Philippe Devaux" (with Suzanne Stern Gillet), ex Annuaire de l'Académie Royale de Belgique, 1985, Gembloux, Duculot, 1985, 153–174
- "Les contributions de Guy Hirsch à la philosophie des sciences", Bulletin de la Société mathématique de Belgique, vol. XXXVIII, 1986, 9–32
- "Belgique", La philosophie en Europe, R. Klibanski and D. Pears (eds.) Paris, Gallimard 1993, 101–123
- "Philippe Devaux, découvreur de la pensée anglo-saxonne", Chromatikon II, Annuaire de la philosophie en procès, Michel Weber and Pierfranceso Basile (eds.), Louvain-la-Neuve, Presses Universitaires de Louvain, 2006, 151–160

== See also ==
- Denis Huisman, Dictionnaire des Philosophes, Paris, Presses Universitaires de France, First Edition, 1984.
- Jean-François Mattéi, Encyclopédie philosophique universelle, tome III, Les Oeuvres philosophiques, Dictionnaire, Paris, Presses Universitaires de France, 1992.
- Dov Gabbay and John Woods, International Directory of Logicians, Amsterdam, Elsevier.
