= Benoit Michel =

Belgian engineer (born 1950)

Benoit Michel (born 1950) is a Belgian engineer. He is the author or co-author of more than 20 technical books on microcomputing, cinema, and stereoscopy.

== Biography ==
Michel received his degree in civil engineering from Université de Liège, Belgium, 1976.

== Professional history ==
Michel co-founded “Neurones”, one of the first 3D cartoon studios in Europe in 1989. After that, he switched to R&D project management in telecommunications, human-machine interaction, digital cinema, and multimedia and is now at the University of Louvain, successively managing the SIMILAR network of excellence on multimodal interfaces, the EDCINE project on enhanced digital cinema, the 3D Media research project focusing on stereoscopic and 3D imaging. He is now working on a medical imaging project called "InVivo/IGT" improving the way 3D images are driving proton therapy machines to cure cancer.

He is a member of the editorial board of ERCIM News, and is working as a consultant for the European Commission, the TWIST cluster of Walloon companies and various private companies and he is the editor of the free “StereoscopyNews” newsletter. He is co-founder of The European Spaceward Association, a non-profit association with a goal to preserve and improve life on earth by going into space.

== Bibliography ==
- Programmes internes du Commodore PET/CBM (ed B.C.M.)
- Le livre du VIC (ed B.C.M.)
- Le livre du 64 (ed B.C.M.)
- Le livre de l'AmigaBasic (ed P.S.I.)
- PC, XT, AT: Maintenance et améliorations (ed B.C.M.)
- Le livre du Pick (ed B.C.M.)
- Clefs pour Amiga (ed P.S.I.)
- Personnalisez votre MS-DOS (ed B.C.M.)
- Programmation Windows en Visual BASIC (ed. Dunod Tech, 1992)
- Digital cinema : Revolution or Evolution (in 'Film Journal International', Aug 2001)
- Similar Dreams 'Multimodal interfaces in our future life' (chapter 8 only) (ed. PUL, 2005)
- Beyond DCI: The integration of object oriented 3D sound into the Digital Cinema (conference paper presented at NEM Summit 2008)
- 3DTV Le futur de la télévision stéréoscopique, avec J-F. Nivart, R. Roberts et V. Breuls de Tiecken, ed. TWIST
- La Stéréoscopie Numérique (ed Eyrolles, 2011, ISBN 978-2-212-129885)
- La Voiture Électrique (ed Now Future, 2018, ISBN 978-2-930940-15-1)
- The electric car here and now (ed Now Future, 2019, ISBN 978-2-930940-19-9)
