= University of Liège =

Belgian public university founded in 1817

Coordinates: 50°38′27″N 05°34′29″E

- Université de Liège
- Latin: Universitas Leodiensis
- Other name: ULiège
- Former name: State University of Liège
- Motto: Scientia Optimum
- Motto in English: Excellence through science
- Type: Public university of the French Community of Belgium
- Established: 1817 (209 years ago)
- Affiliations: AUF; EUA; IAU; T.I.M.E. SGroup; EFMB; EUR-ACE; EQUIS; CGE; WHO; COP (permanent observer)
- Rector: Prof. Anne-Sophie Nyssen
- Administrator: Anne Girin
- Faculty: 1,398 (2021)
- Administrative staff: 2,022 (2018)
- Students: 26,863 (2021)
- Doctoral students: 2,260 (2021)
- Location: Liège; Arlon; Gembloux, Belgium
- Campus: Multiples sites
- Colors: Teal blue
- Website: www.uliege.be

The University of Liège (French: Université de Liège), or ULiège, is a major public research university of the French Community of Belgium founded in 1817 and based in Liège, Belgium. Its official language is French.

Since the 1970s its main campus is located on the Sart-Tilman hill, about ten kilometers south of Liège, but the university retains its historic headquarters and numerous administrative offices in the city center, as well as four of its eleven faculties. It has secondary installments throughout the Liège Province; in addition to Gembloux Agro-Bio Tech which is based in Gembloux (Namur), and the Department of Environmental Sciences and Management in Arlon (Luxembourg). As a research intensive university, it also operates multiple facilities abroad: the STARESO oceanography station in Corsica, the Jungfraujoch weather station in Switzerland, the KATABATA stations in Greenland, as well as scientific stations and observatories in Chile (SPECULOOS and TRAPPIST-South), in Morocco (TRAPPIST-North), and in Tenerife, Spain.

== History ==
The university was founded in 1817 by William I of the Netherlands, then King of the United Kingdom of the Netherlands, and by his Minister of Education, Anton Reinhard Falck. The foundation of the university was the result of a long intellectual tradition which dates back to the origins of the Prince-Bishopric of Liège. Beginning in the eleventh century, the influence of the principality attracted students and prominent scientists and philosophers, such as Petrarch, to study in its libraries. The reputation of its medieval schools gave the city the reputation as a new Athens.

A 17 March 1808 decree by Napoleon I concerning the organization of an imperial university indicated Liège as the site of a new academy to be composed of a Faculty of Arts and a Faculty of Science—the first university charter for Liège. Ultimately, Liège owes its university to William I of the Netherlands, who remembered the city's prestigious legacy of teaching and culture when he decided to establish a new university on Walloon soil.

Nearly 200 years later, settled to some extent in the Sart-Tilman district of Liège, the University of Liège belongs to the French community of Belgium. The university is located at the edge of the river Meuse, in the center of the Island, the Latin Quarter of Liège. In 2009, the Agronomical University of Gembloux (FUSAGx), based in Gembloux, in the Province of Namur, integrated ULiège. It has adopted a new name for academics as well as research, namely Gembloux Agro-Bio Tech.

=== Chronology ===
- 1817: foundation of the University of Liege by William I of the Netherlands
- 1838: opening of the Liège mining school
- 1881: first female student
- 1882: beginning of the construction of the Trasenster Institutes in Liège:
  - 1882: Institute of Astrophysics and the Cointe Observatory;
  - 1883: Institute of Pharmacy, the Botanical Institute and the Montefiore Institute of Electrical Engineering;
  - 1885: the Auguste Swaen Institute of Anatomy;
  - 1888: Institutes of Physiology, of Zoology and of Chemistry
- 1955: foundation of the University of Lubumbashi (called Elisabethville at the time) by the State University of Liège
- 1967: beginning of the transfer process from the city center to the Sart Tilman campus
- 1969: the Cureghem University of Veterinary Medicine in Brussels is administratively attached to the University of Liège
- 1989: the State University of Liège becomes a university of the French Community of Belgium
- 1991: The Faculty of Veterinary Medicine is transferred from Brussels to the Sart Tilman campus
- 2004: The Fondation universitaire luxembourgeoise integrates the University of Liège, creating the Faculty of Science's Department of Environmental Science and Management
- 2005: HEC Liège (Management School) and the Department of Economics and Business Administration of the University of Liège merge to create the HEC Liège – School of Management of the University of Liège business school
- 2009: The University of Agricultural Sciences of Gembloux (FUSAGx) in Gembloux is integrated into the University of Liège, becoming an independent faculty under the name Gembloux Agro-Bio Tech
- 2010: Through the merger of the Institut supérieur d'architecture Saint-Luc de Liège (ISA Saint-Luc Liège) and the Institut supérieur d'architecture Lambert Lombard (ISAI LL), a new faculty is created within ULiège: the Faculty of Architecture
- 2015: the Institute of Human and Social Sciences (ISHS) becomes an independent faculty: the Faculty of Social Sciences (FaSS)
- 2021: The Department of Media, Culture and Communication of the Faculty of Philosophy and Letters establishes its school of journalism, with various auditoriums, classrooms and studios in the renovated Grand Poste de Liège; named Media Campus, these facilities are located in front of the historical faculty buildings. The student radio station 48FM is also moving there.

== Organisation ==
University rankings

Global – Overall
- ARWU World: 401–500 (2025)
- CWUR World: 307 (2025)
- CWTS World: 563 (2025)
- QS World: =379 (2026)
- THE World: 301–350 (2026)
- USNWR Global: = 360 (2026)

National – Overall
- ARWU National: 6–7 (2023)
- QS National: 7 (2024)
- THE National: 7 (2024)

The rector of ULiège is Professor Anne-Sophie Nyssen, who succeeded Professor Pierre Wolper in 2022, becoming the first woman to hold this position. Anne Girin has been the university's Administrator since September 1, 2020. She replaced Laurent Despy and became the first woman to hold the position.

The University of Liège counts:

- 24,522 students
  - 4,600 foreign students
- 4,300 employees
  - 2,800 faculty members (both teaching and research)
  - 1,300 administrative and technical support staff

ULiège comprises 11 faculties:

- Faculty of Philosophy and Letters
- Faculty of Law, Political Science and Criminology
  - The Jean Constant Graduate School of Criminology
- Faculty of Social Science
- Faculty of Science
- Faculty of Applied Science
- Faculty of Medicine
- Faculty of Veterinary Medicine
- Gembloux Agro-Bio Tech – Faculty of Agronomical Science and Bioengineering
- Faculty of Psychology, Logopedics and Educational Sciences
- Faculty of Architecture
- HEC Liège Management School

=== Campus ===
Since the 1970s, ULiège's main campus has been the Sart-Tilman hill, a vast planned community campus located about ten kilometers south from the center of Liège. However, the university has kept its headquarters and many administrative facilities in the city centre, as well as the Faculty of Philosophy and Letters, the Institutes of Zoology, Anatomy, the HEC Liège Management School and the newly incorporated Faculty of Architecture.

The Gembloux Agro-Bio Tech campus and faculty are located in the city of Gembloux, Namur Province, and Faculty of Science Department of Environmental Science and Management is located in Arlon, Luxembourg Province.

The university also owns a scientific research station in the Belgian High Fens since 1924, the STARESO oceanography station in Calvi, Corsica, France, a meteorological station and the Sphinx Observatory on the Jungfraujoch, Switzerland, since 1950 and research stations and observatories in Chile (SPECULOOS and TRAPPIST-South), Morocco and Tenerife, Spain (TRAPPIST-North).

== Notable alumni ==
For full list, see University of Liège alumni.

- Joaquín Arderíus, novelist
- Philippe Bodson, engineer
- Albert Claude, Nobel Prize for Physiology or Medicine in 1974
- Marie Delcourt, first female professor at the ULiège
- Marcel Detienne, philosophy and literature (PhD)
- Paul Demaret, rector of the College of Europe
- Jacques H. Drèze, economist
- Paul Fredericq (1850–1920), historian
- Michel A. J. Georges, veterinary, 2008 Francqui Prize
- Jean Gol (1942–1995), lawyer, politician
- Georges Gutelman, businessman and part of Operation Moses
- Alexis Jacquemin (1938–2004), economy, 1983 Francqui Prize on Human Sciences
- David Keilin, entomologist
- Garance Genicot, Economist, Professor at Georgetown University
- Auguste Kerckhoffs, Dutch linguist and cryptographer
- Jean-Marie Klinkenberg, linguist and semiotician
- Jan Kowalewski, Polish cryptologist
- Wincenty Kowalski, Polish military commander
- Marc Lacroix (1963- ), biochemist
- Joseph Lebeau, statesman
- Jean-Christophe Marine, biologist
- Benoit Michel, engineer and author
- Marcel Nicolet, Belgian physicist and meteorologist
- Jean-Baptiste Nothomb, statesman and diplomat
- Dr. Pascasie Nyirahabimana, physicist and physics education researcher
- Stanisław Olszewski, Polish engineer and inventor
- Paul Pastur, lawyer and politician (1866–1938)
- Joseph Plateau (1801–1883), physicist
- Georges Poulet, literary critic
- Guy Quaden, economist, Governor of the National Bank of Belgium
- Jean Rey (1902–1983), second President of the European Commission
- Max Rooses, writer
- Léon Rosenfeld, physicist
- Philippe-Charles Schmerling, pioneer in paleontology
- Theodor Schwann, developer of cell theory and discoverer of Schwann cells
- Polidor Swings, 1948 laureate of the Francqui Prize
- Haroun Tazieff, French vulcanologist and geologist
- André Henri Constant van Hasselt, poet
- Shady Attia, engineer
- Rasheed Ladoja, Politician and Monarch

== Notable faculty ==
- Zénon-M. Bacq (1903–1983), radiobiologist
- Florent-Joseph Bureau (1906–1999), mathematician
- Eugène Charles Catalan, mathematician
- André Danthine, computer scientist
- Marcel Florkin (1900–1979), medicine, biochemistry
- Laurent-Guillaume de Koninck (1809–1887), palaeontologist and chemist
- Émile Louis Victor de Laveleye, economist
- Marie Delcourt (1891–1979), classical philologist
- Philippe Devaux (1902–1979), philosopher
- Paul Fourmarier (1877–1970), geologist
- Paul Gochet (1932–2011), philosopher
- Groupe μ, Group of semioticians
- Godefroid Kurth (1847–1916), historian
- Paul Ledoux (1914–1988), astrophysicist
- Jean-Pierre Nuel (1847–1920), physiologist
- Pol Swings (1906–1983), astrophysicist
- Edouard Van Beneden (1846–1910), biologist
- Theodor Schwann (1810–1882), biologist

== Honorary doctorate ==
- Salman Rushdie (September 1999)
- Dominique Strauss-Kahn (May 2011)
- Mikhail Gorbachev (2011)
- Bill Viola (2010)

== See also ==
- Academia Belgica
- Belgian Academy Council of Applied Sciences
- BioLiège
- Cointe Observatory
- Francqui Foundation
- Liège Science Park
- List of modern universities in Europe (1801–1945)
- National Fund for Scientific Research
- Open access in Belgium
- Science and technology in Wallonia
- Science Parks of Wallonia
- Top Industrial Managers for Europe (TIME) network for student mobility
- TRAPPIST, a telescope operated since 2010
- University Foundation
