= Cointe Observatory =

Observatory in Liège, Belgium

Coordinates: 50.6175°N 5.5630°E

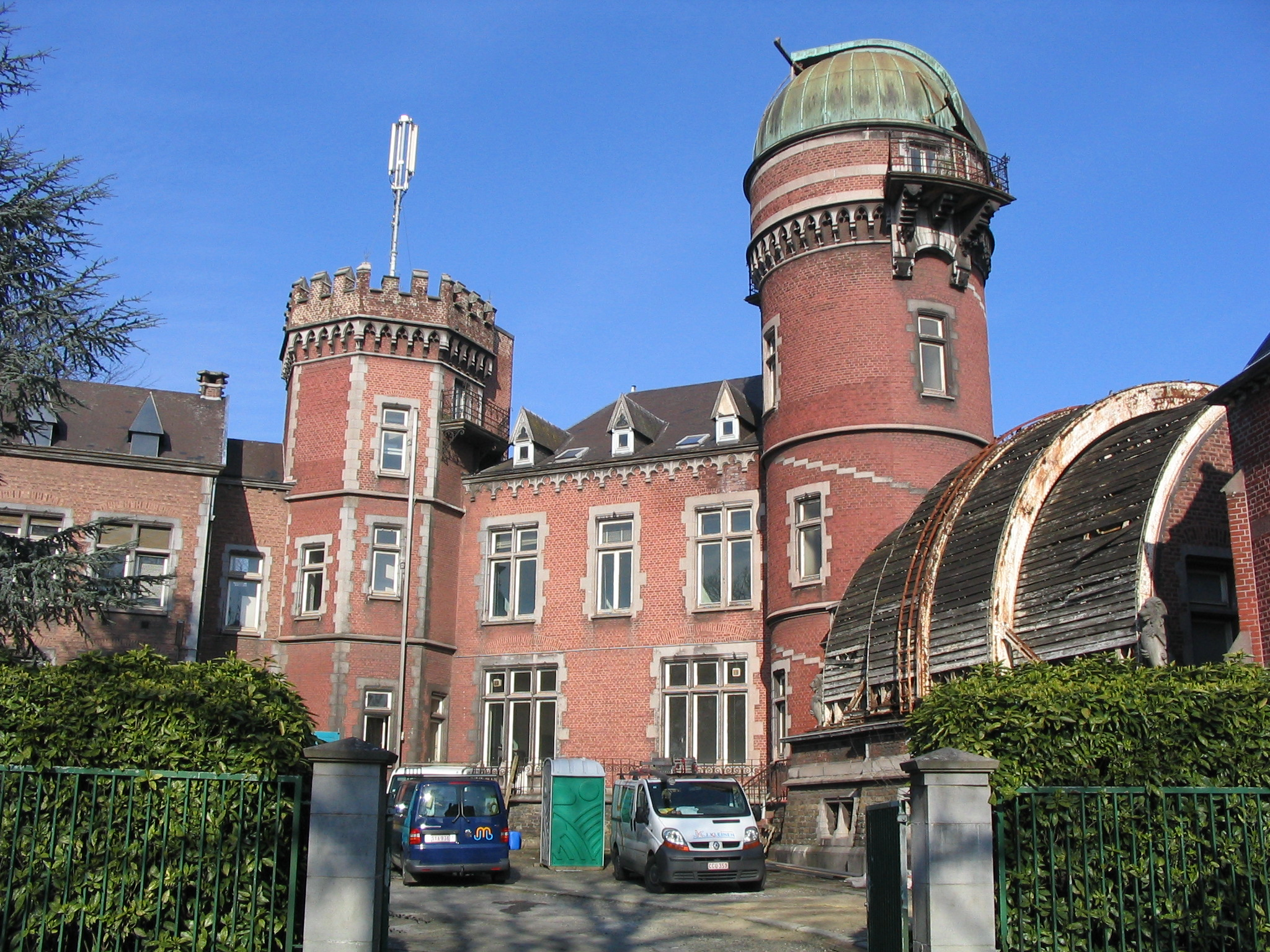
Cointe Observatory

Cointe Observatory (French: Observatoire de Cointe), situated in the district of Cointe in Liège, Belgium, was built by the University of Liège in 1881–82 to plans by the architect Lambert Noppius.

The building, in a medieval revival style, is sited in a private park formerly the estate of the wealthy industrialist Vanderheyden de Hauzeur family. It accommodated the university's Institute of Astrophysics, later the Institute of Astrophysics and Geophysics, until 2002, when the institute was moved to the Sart-Tilman campus.

As of 2008 the building was occupied by the Société Astronomique de Liège, but was in the course of renovation with the intention that it should house the Service Régional des Fouilles Archéologiques.

== See also ==
- List of astronomical observatories

== Sources ==
- Houziaux, L. (ed. Eugène Wahle) 1981: L'astronomie et l'astrophysique dans Apports de Liège au progrès des sciences et des techniques ISBN 2-87011-090-1
