= Pierre Wolper =

Belgian computer scientist

- Known for: Computer science

Pierre Wolper is a Belgian computer scientist at the University of Liège. His research interests include verification methods for reactive and concurrent programs, as well as temporal databases. He is the co-recipient of the 2000 Gödel Prize, along with Moshe Y. Vardi, for his work on temporal logic with finite automata. He also received the 2005 Paris Kanellakis Award for this work.

Following elections in October 2018, he became Rector of the University of Liège. He was succeeded by Professor Anne-Sophie Nyssen in May 2022.
