= Science Parks of Wallonia =

Association of seven Belgian science parks

Created in 2002, SPoW -Science Parks of Wallonia-, is an association of seven Belgian science parks located in Wallonia:

- Louvain-la-Neuve Science Park, in Ottignies-Louvain-la-Neuve, Walloon-Brabant
- Liège Science Park, in Seraing, Liège
- Crealys Science Park, in Gembloux, Namur
- Aéropole Science Park, in Charleroi, Hainaut
- Initialis Science Park, in Mons, Hainaut
- Qualitis Science Park, in Enghien, Hainaut
- Novalis Science Park, in Marche-en-Famenne, Luxembourg

The main objectives of the network are:

- To take part to the regional development and the innovation process
- To ensure the promotion of the Science Parks
- To foster relationships and collaborations between the innovative companies located on the Parks.

The business incubators of the parks also provide a whole set of services to fledgling spin-offs.

The seven University-related research parks are currently home to more than 600 companies and 13500 employees.

== See also ==
- Agoria
- Science and technology in Wallonia

== Sources ==
- Les parc scientifiques wallons (in French)
- SPoW Quality Charter
