= Koekkoek =

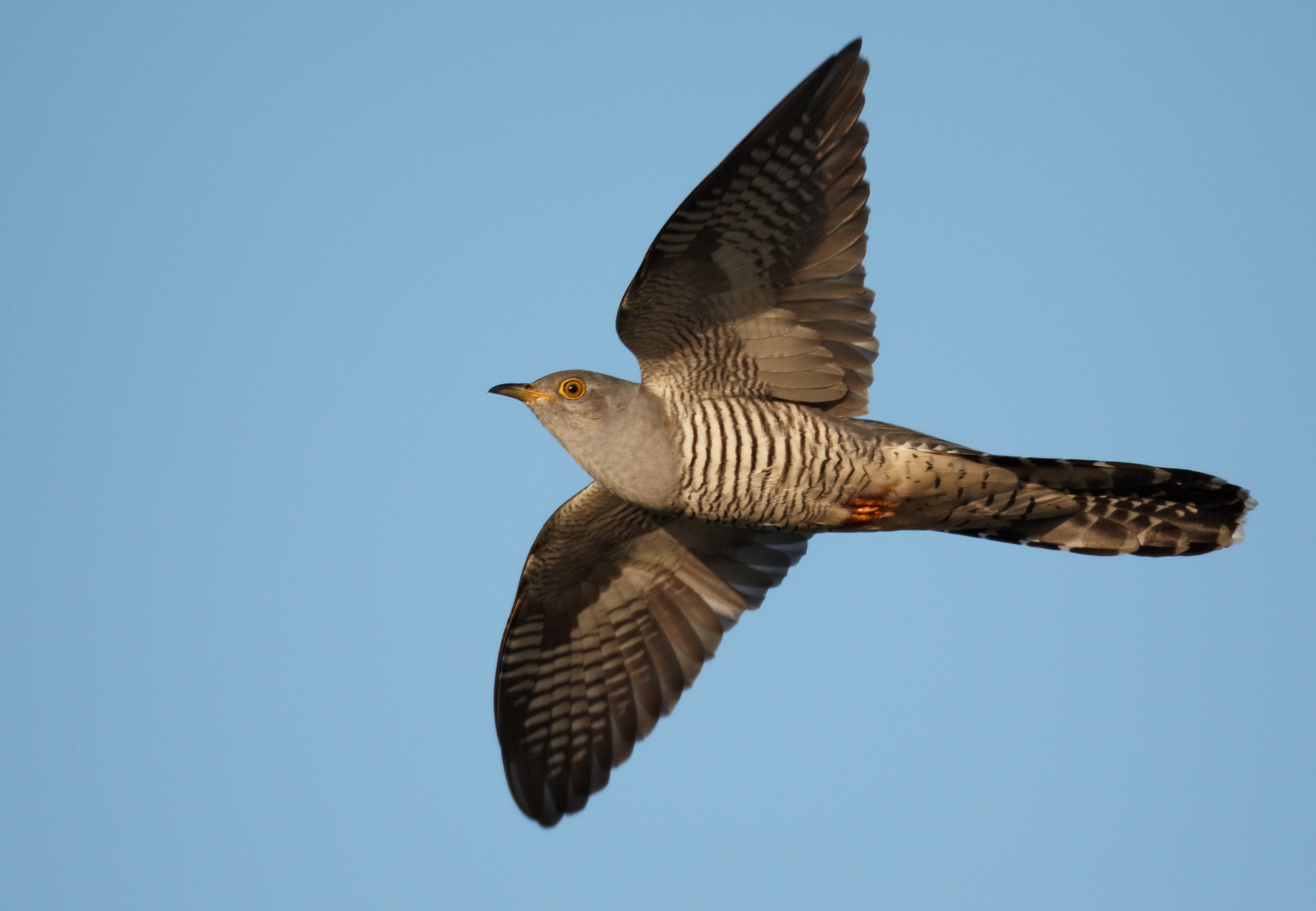
Common cuckoo in flight

Koekkoek or Koekoek is a Dutch family name. Koekoek means "cuckoo" in Dutch.

The surname may refer to:

Koekkoek family, a Dutch dynasty of landscape painters:

- Johannes Hermanus Koekkoek (1778–1851), Dutch artist and his four sons:
  - (1) Barend Cornelis Koekkoek (1803–1862), Dutch landscape artist, husband of painter Elise Thérèse Koekkoek-Daiwaille; they were parents of
    - (1.1) Adèle Koekkoek (1838–1919)
    - (1.2) Maria Louise Koekkoek (1840–1910)
  - (2) Marinus Adrianus Koekkoek the Elder (1807–1868), Dutch artist, father of
    - Hendrik Pieter Koekkoek (1843–1927)
  - (3) Johannes Koekkoek (1811–1831), Dutch artist
  - (4) Hermanus Koekkoek (1815–1882), Dutch artist and his four sons:
    - (4.1) Hermanus Koekkoek the Younger (1836–1909), Dutch artist, father of
      - Stephen Robert Koekkoek (1887–1934)
    - (4.2) Willem Koekkoek (1839–1895), Dutch artist, father of
      - (4.2.1) Hermanus Willem Koekkoek (1867–1929)
      - (4.2.2) Marinus Adrianus Koekkoek the Younger (1873–1944)
    - (4.3) Johannes Hermanus Barend Koekkoek (1840–1912), Dutch artist, father of
      - Gerard Koekkoek (1871–1956), Dutch painter
    - (4.4) Hendrik Barend Koekkoek (1849–1909), Dutch artist

Οther people with the surname

- Hendrik Koekoek (1912–1987), Dutch politician
- Marieke Koekkoek (born 1989), Dutch politician
- Rike Koekkoek (born 1960), German footballer
- Slater Koekkoek (born 1994), Canadian hockey defenceman
