= Marinus Adrianus Koekkoek the Younger =

Dutch painter

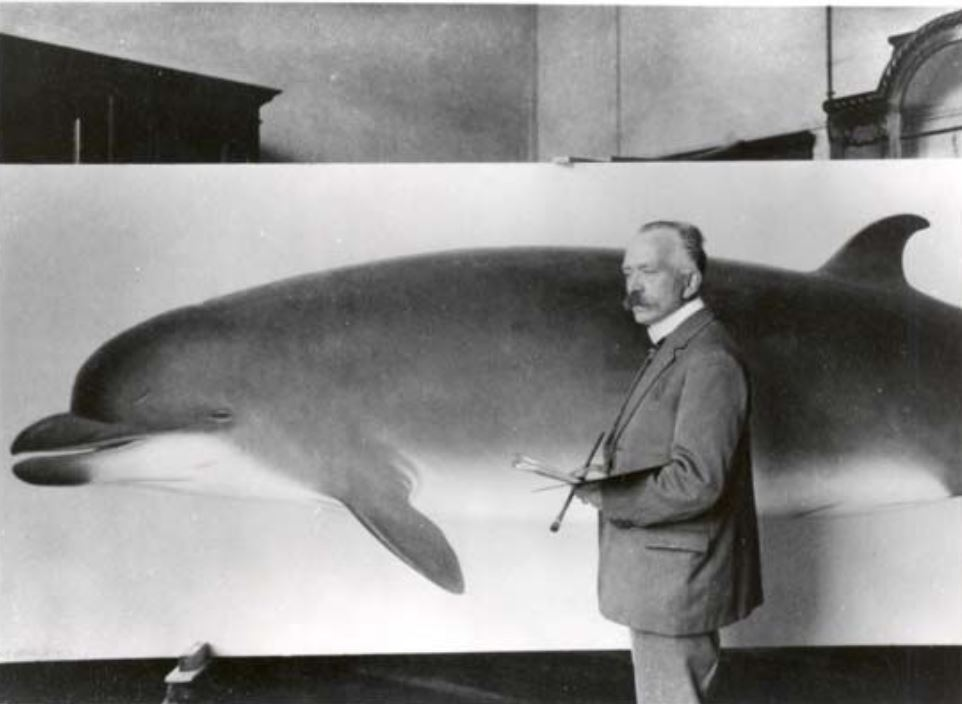
Marinus Adrianus Koekkoek (1930s)

Marinus Adrianus Koekkoek, known as The Younger (29 January 1873 – 30 May 1944) was a Dutch animal painter, who specialized in birds. He is referred to as "the younger" to distinguish him from his great-uncle, the landscape painter, Marinus Adrianus Koekkoek, after whom he was named.

== Life and work ==
He was a member of the famous Koekkoek family of painters; son of the cityscape painter, Willem Koekkoek; grandson of Hermanus Koekkoek, and great-grandson of Johannes Hermanus Koekkoek. His brother, Hermanus Willem, also became a painter; specializing in military subjects. His father gave him and Hermanus their first art lessons.

His career began and ended in Amsterdam. In between, he spent twenty years at the Rijksmuseum van Oudheden, in Leiden, illustrating academic works. He is best-known for his watercolor illustrations; notably Ornithologia Neerlandica: de vogels van Nederland, by Eduard Daniël van Oort, which was published in five parts from 1922 to 1935. He also created color plates for two series of schoolbooks on nature: In Ons Land, and Buiten Ons Land. His last works were a set of postcards for Natura Artis Magistra, a zoo in Amsterdam.

Following World War II, he was falsely accused of having been a Nazi collaborator; creating propaganda posters for the Hitler Youth and the Nederlands Arbeidsfront. In 2011, it was demonstrated that the posters were actually created by his son, Cornelis Koekkoek, who was associated with the National Socialist Dutch Workers Party.

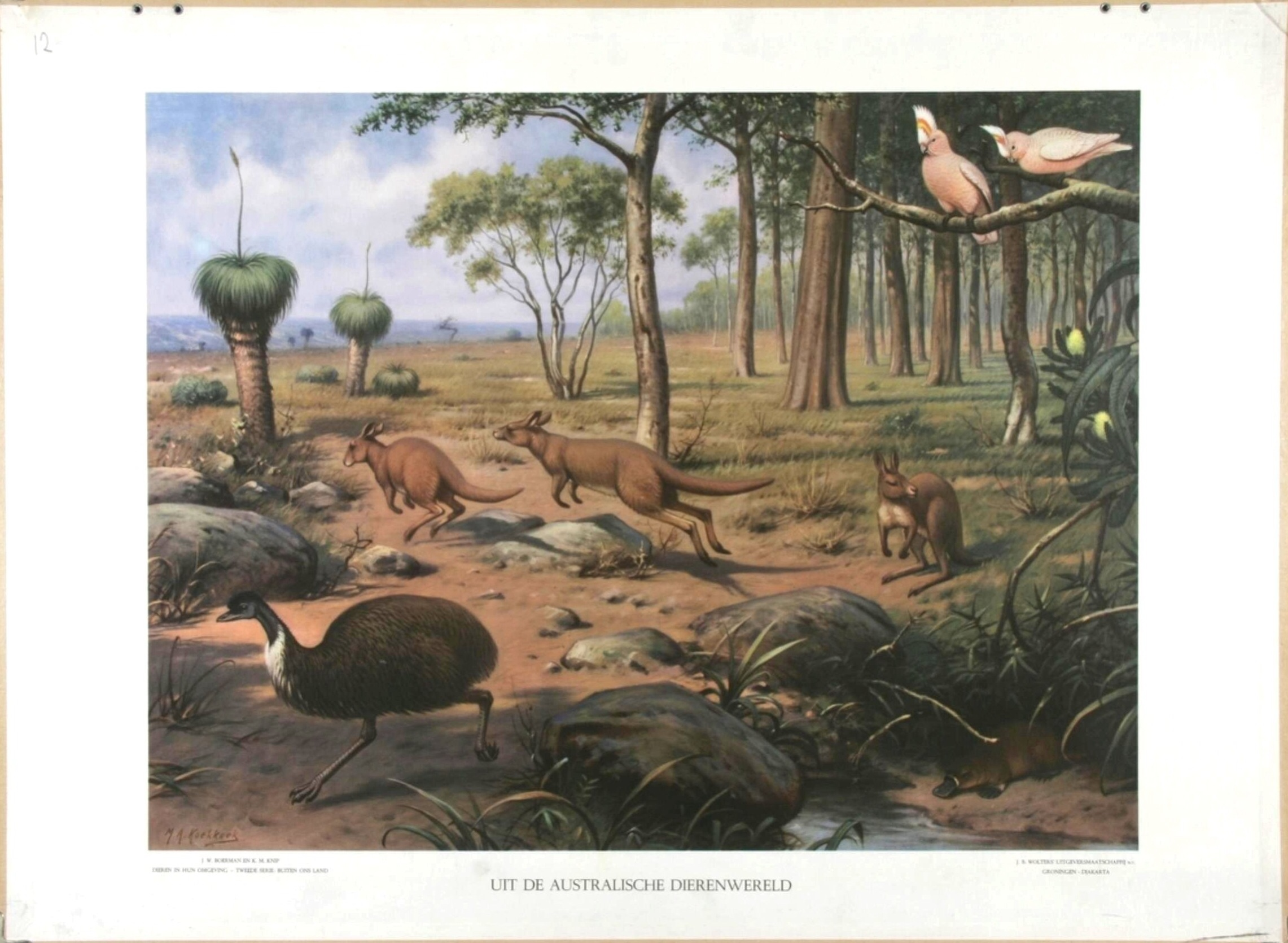
"From the Australian Animal World", a classroom wall poster in the series, Dieren en hun omgeving (Animals and Their Environment)

A species of snake, Malayotyphlops koekkoeki, on the Indonesian island of Bunyu, near Borneo, was named in his honor.
