= Bladelin Altarpiece =

Triptych by Rogier van der Weyden

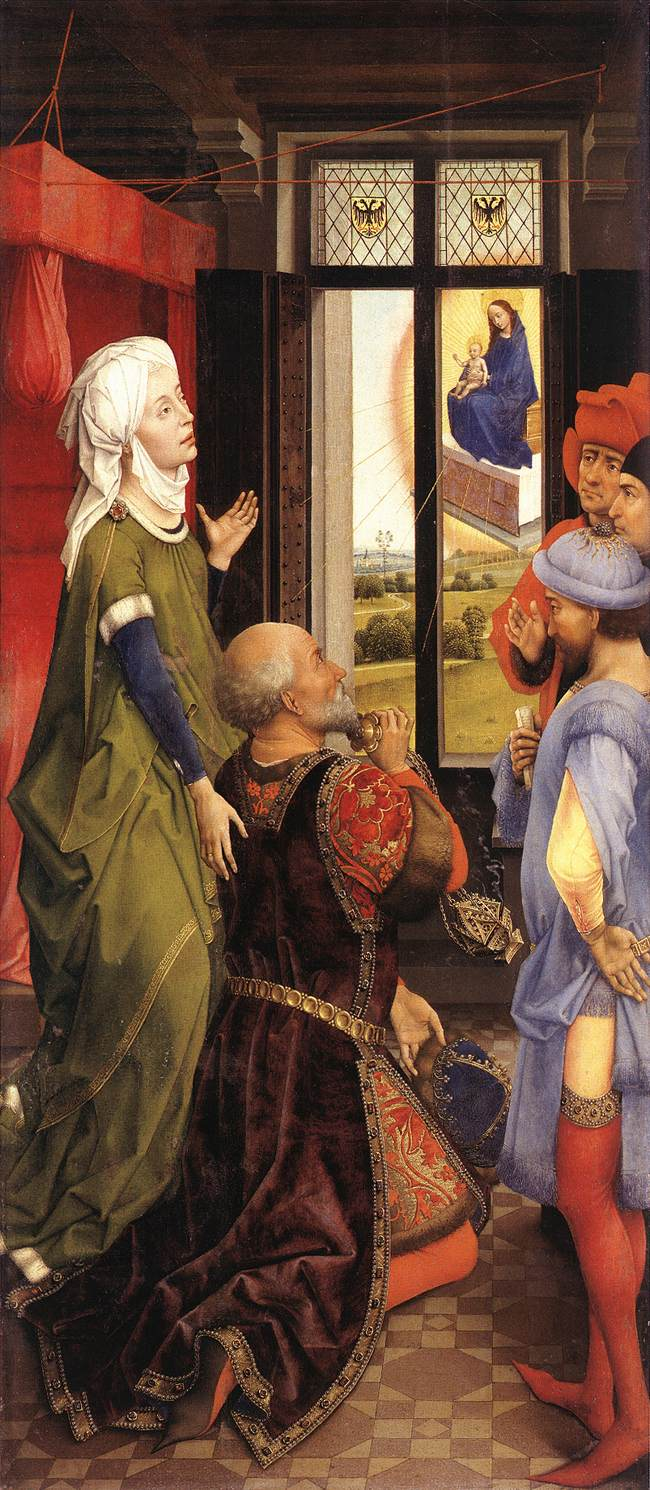
Left: vision of Augustus

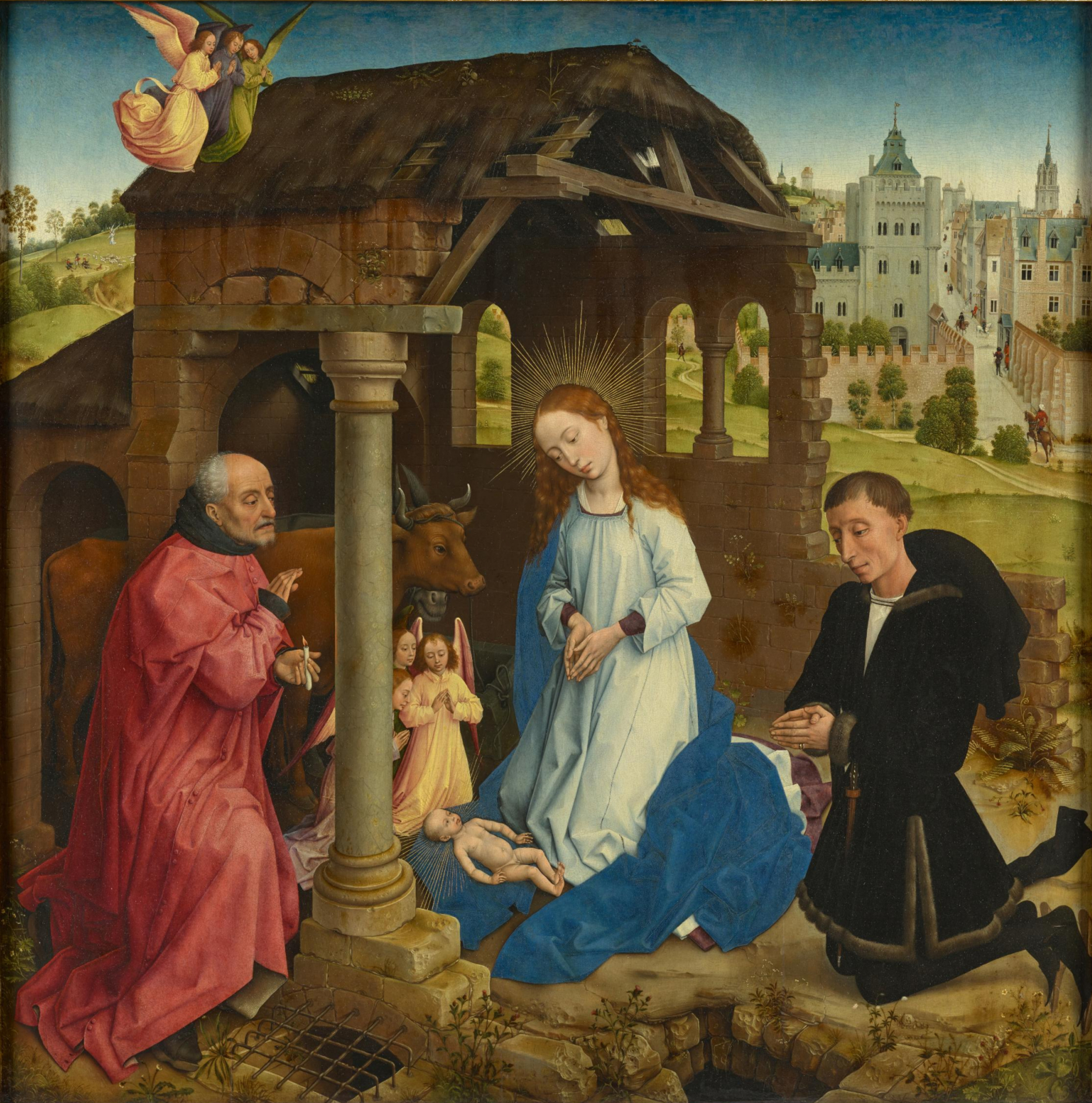
Centre: birth of Jesus

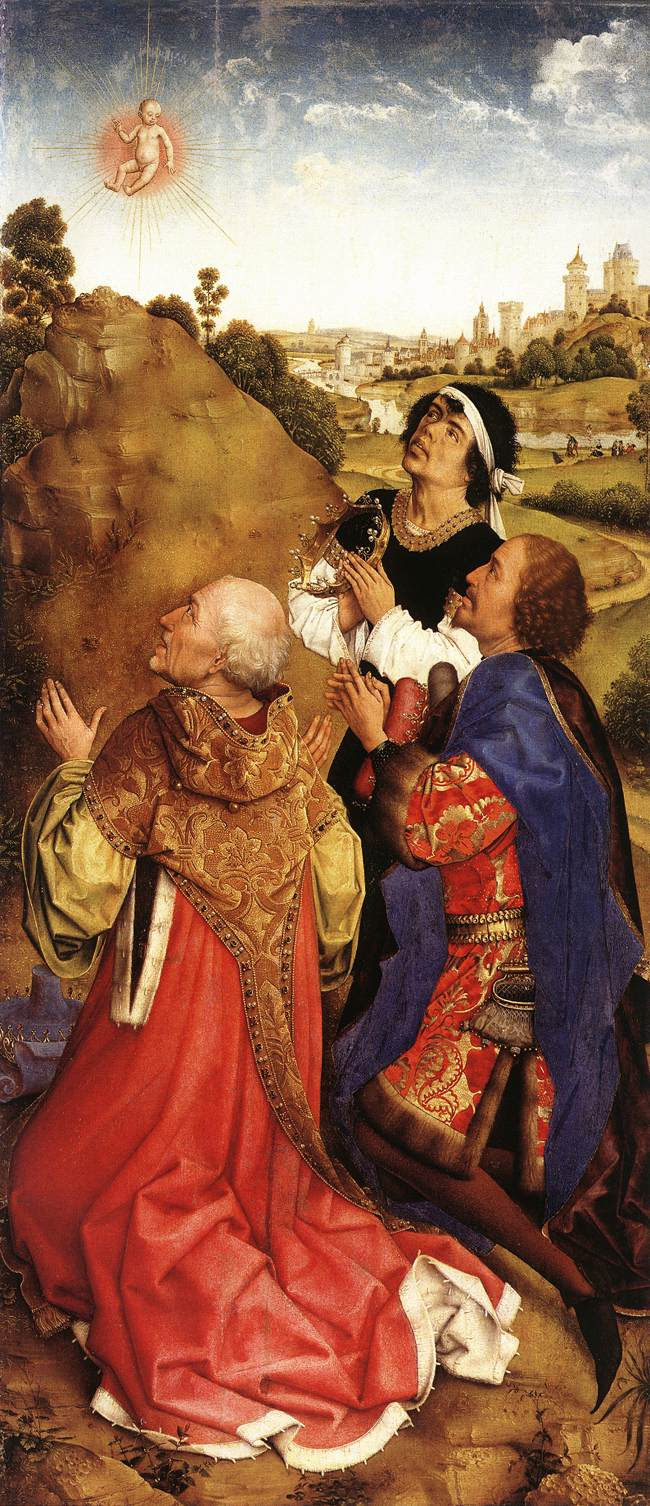
Right: arrival of the Magi

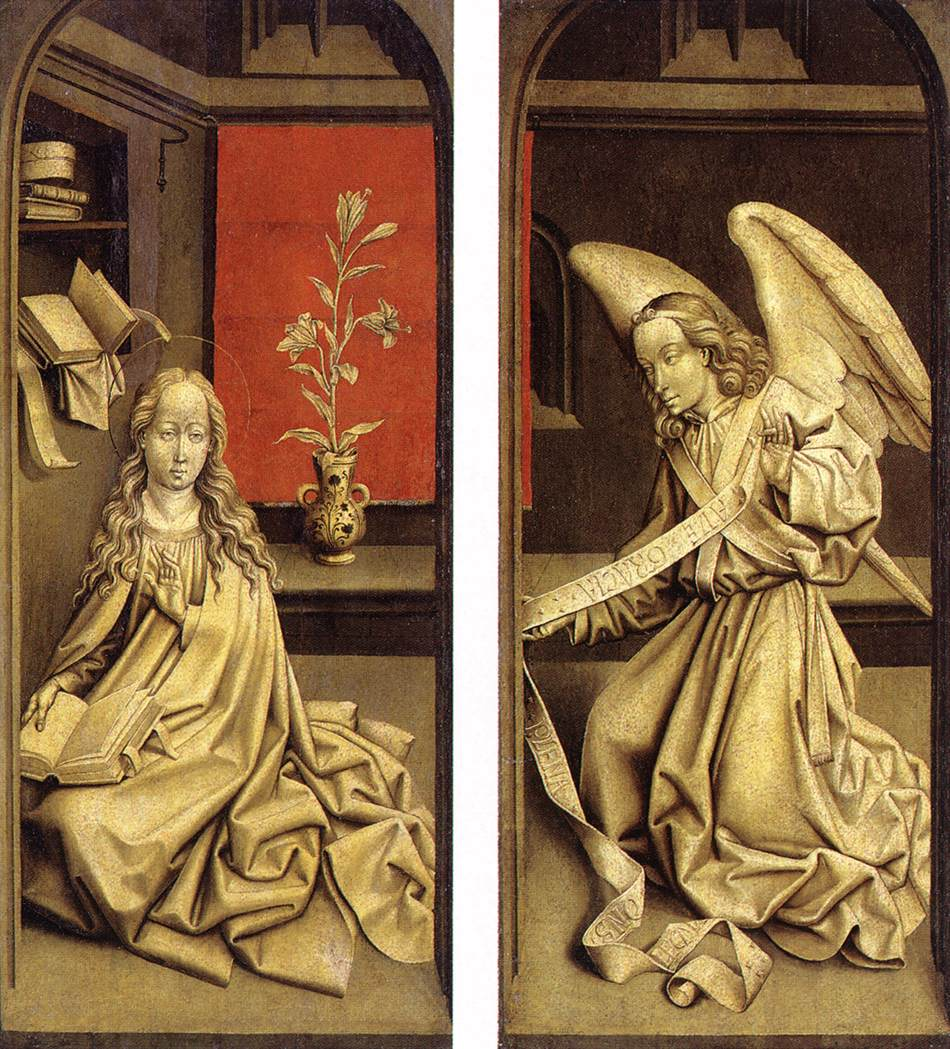
Outside faces of the side panels: the Annunciation

The Bladelin Altarpiece, or Middelburg Altarpiece, is a triptych painting created around 1450 by the Early Netherlandish painter Rogier van der Weyden, towards the end of his artistic career. It depicts scenes relating to the birth of Jesus; and as the only nativity scene definitively attributed to van der Weyden is sometimes known as the Nativity Triptych (although the Saint Columba Altarpiece shows the Adoration of the Magi).

The triptych was donated to the new church of Middelburg in 1460, possibly by the town's founder Pieter Bladelin. It has been in the Gemäldegalerie, Berlin, since 1834.

== Description ==
The large central panel depicts the birth of Jesus, with Virgin and Child in the stable at Bethlehem, accompanied by beasts and angels. The composition draws much from the 1420 Nativity of van der Weyden's master, Robert Campin, in Dijon. The stable is a half-ruined thatched Romanesque building, rather than the traditional wooden hut, with stone walls and arched windows, and one prominent classical pillar, uniquely in van der Weyden's work shown in an oblique perspective view. Three adult figures are kneeling, worshiping the Christ Child. Mary is wearing a light blue gown, with a deep blue cloak; to the left, Joseph in a red gown holds a lighted candle, balanced by a donor portrait of man in black clothes, kneeling outside the stable to the right. Below Joseph is a large metal grate, possibly covering the mouth of an underground cistern. In the background, to the left, is a tiny scene of an angel announcing the birth of Jesus to shepherds, while to the right is a city scene with a road, walls and towers.

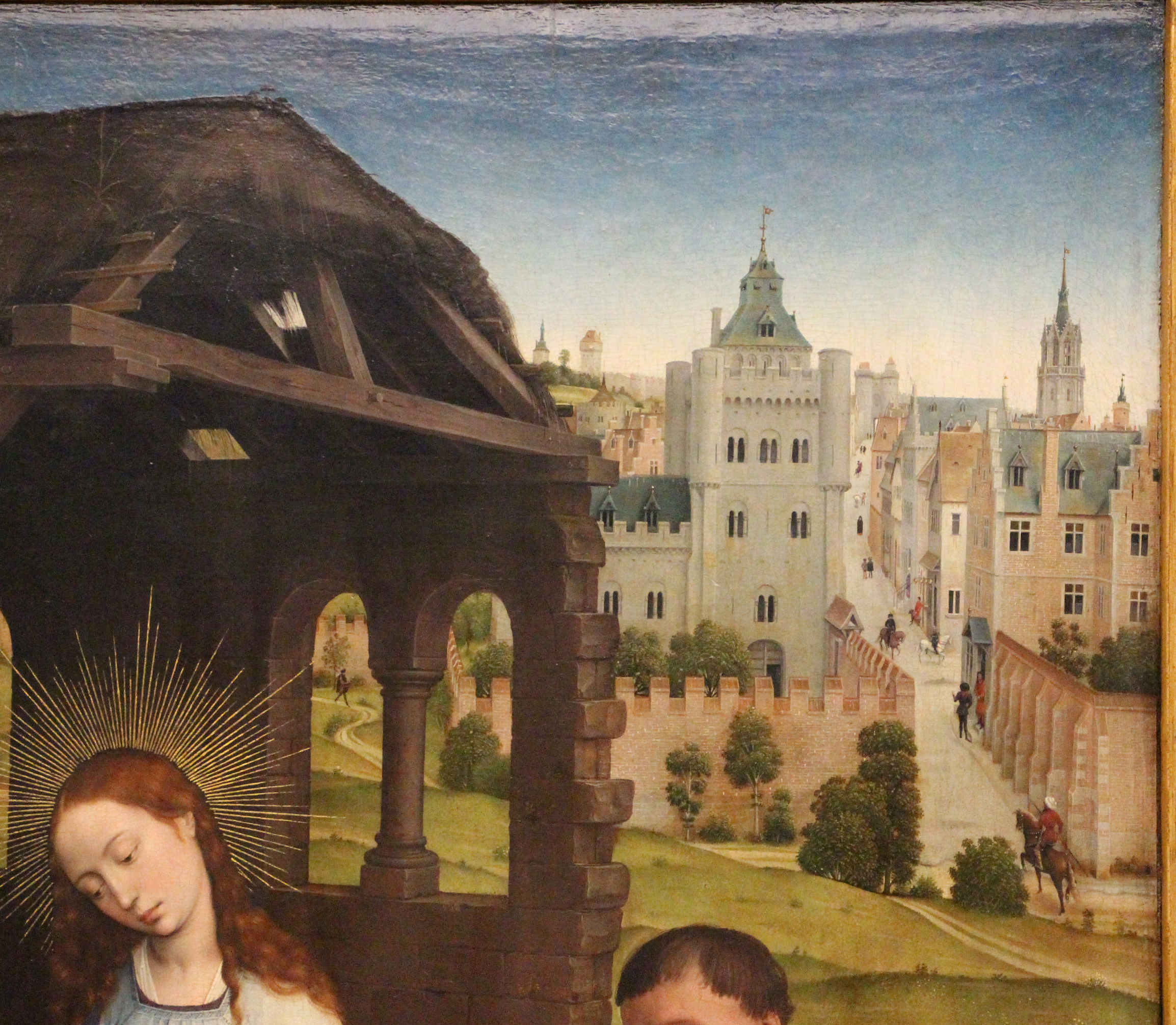
Detail, central panel

The two smaller side panels show related scenes. The left panel draws from the Speculum Humanae Salvationis and depicts the legendary occasion when the Roman Emperor Augustus consulted the Tiburtine Sibyl to ask if he was the greatest man on earth and if he should consent to being worshiped as a god; the Sybil revealed to him a vision of the Virgin and Child, and Augustus then reputedly founded an altar in Rome to the "firstborn of god" (Ara primogeniti Dei) at the location now occupied by the Ara Coeli. The emperor is kneeling next to the Sybil, looking towards the central panel to observe the vision through a window symbolically marked with the double-headed eagle of the Habsburgs; to his right stand three attendants, possible based on courtiers of the Philip the Good; all are wearing 15th century Flemish dress. The right panel shows the arrival of the three Magi in Bethlehem, bearing gifts; they kneel facing towards the central panel to observe a vision of an infant Christ Child.

The side panels of the altarpiece would only be opened to reveal the brightly coloured images inside for church services at the weekend and on other special occasions. Most of the time the doors were closed, concealing the main images within. The outside surfaces of the side panels were decorated by an unknown artist with a grisaille of the Annunciation, with the Virgin Mary to the left, with a red curtain and a vase with a symbolic lily, and the Angel Gabriel to the right with a speech scroll bearing the words "AVE GRAZIA PLENA" (Latin: "Hail [Mary] full of grace"). As a result, the triptych has four Annunciation scenes: one to Mary on the outside, and three inside: one to Augustus, one to the Magi, and one to the shepherds.

The middle panel measures 93.5 by 92 centimetres (36.8 in × 36.2 in). The left panel measures 93.5 by 41.8 centimetres (36.8 in × 16.5 in), and the right panel is fractionally smaller, measuring 93.5 by 41.5 centimetres (36.8 in × 16.3 in).

== Commission ==
The work may have been donated by Pieter Bladelin (c. 1410-72), treasurer of Philip the Good, Duke of Burgundy, as the altarpiece for the new town church of Saints Peter and Paul in Middelburg in Flanders. Bladelin founded the town in 1450 and devoted much effort to its construction as a personal project. The church was consecrated by the French bishop Jean Chevrot shortly before the bishop's death in 1460. However, there is only a single donor portrait, a man dressed in black with a fur-trimmed cloak and pointed wooden sandals, and it would have been more usual for Bladelin to be accompanied by his wife, Margerite van de Vageviere, leading to some doubt about the identity of the donor. The castle depicted in the middle panel is thought to that in Middelburg.

It has been in the collection of the Gemäldegalerie, Berlin, since 1834.

== See also ==
- List of works by Rogier van der Weyden
