= Hermanus Willem Koekkoek =

Dutch painter (1867–1929)

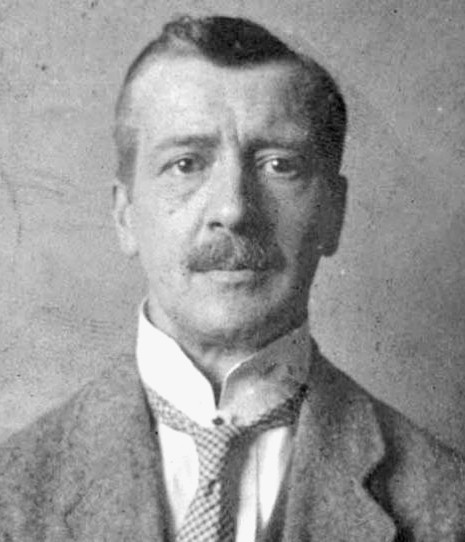
- Born: 7 January 1867; Amsterdam, Netherlands
- Died: 9 September 1929 (aged 62); Amsterdam, Netherlands
- Occupations: Painter, illustrator, watercolorist

Hermanus Willem Koekkoek (7 January 1867 – 9 September 1929) was a Dutch painter, illustrator and watercolorist. He worked in several genres, but is best known for his military art.

== Life and work ==
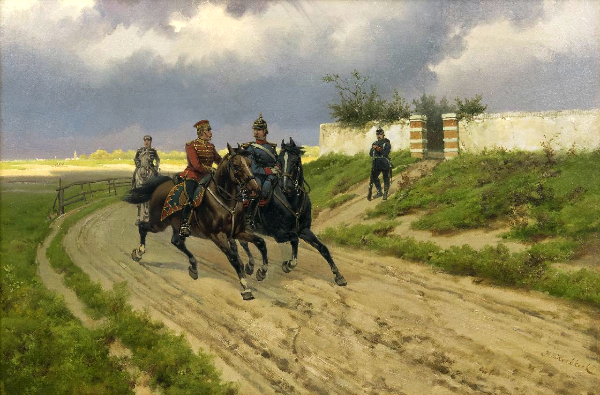
A Pair of Prussian Cavalrymen

He was a member of the famous Koekkoek family of painters; eldest son of the cityscape painter, Willem Koekkoek, grandson of Hermanus Koekkoek, and great-grandson of Johannes Hermanus Koekkoek. His brother was the illustrator, Marinus Adrianus Koekkoek. He and Marinus received their first art lessons from their father.

Initially, he lived and worked in Amsterdam. From 1887 to 1891, he was in London, where his uncle, Hermanus (The Younger), operated an art dealership. After another decade in Amsterdam, he returned to London, and lived there until the early 1920s. He was married to Louisa Johannah de Layen. Their daughter, Louise Hermina, was a painter and sculptor.

He was one of only a few Dutch artists who specialized in military scenes. Many of them depict operations from the Franco-Prussian War, for which he did meticulous research. He preferred to paint dramatic attacks, but also created scenes from the daily lives of the soldiers. In England, he worked for The Illustrated London News, The Sketch and The Royal Magazine. There, he created drawings illustrating the Second Boer War.

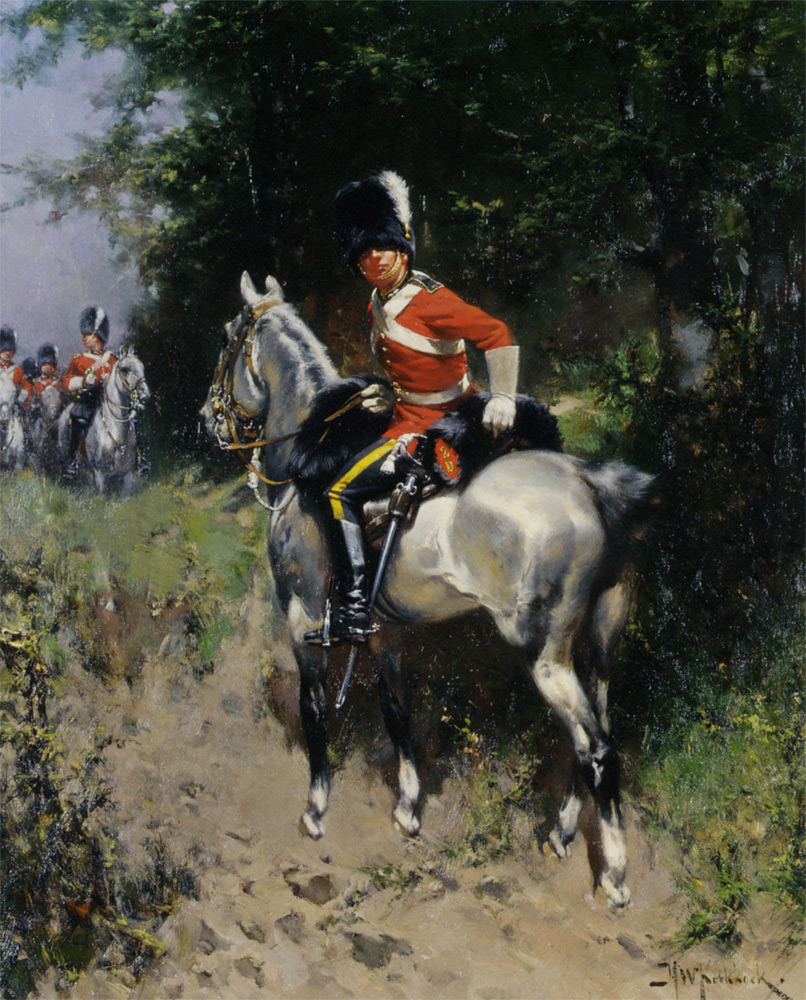
Hussars

During World War I, his drawings appeared regularly in all the military-themed magazines. In London and Amsterdam, he worked for Williams & Sutch (The United Arts Gallery), who sold his paintings in the United States and Canada. His landscapes and still-lifes were popular there. He also exhibited his works at Dutch galleries; including Oldenzeel, in Rotterdam, and Th. Flachs, in Amsterdam. Some of works may be seen at the Legermuseum in Delft.
