= Humanae =

Humanae may refer to:

- Dignitatis Humanae is the Second Vatican Council's Declaration on Religious Freedom.
- Humanae Vitae is an encyclical written by Pope Paul VI and promulgated on July 25, 1968.
- The Speculum Humanae Salvationis was a bestselling anonymous illustrated work of popular theology in the late Middle Ages.
