= Thomas Gaal =

Flemish painter

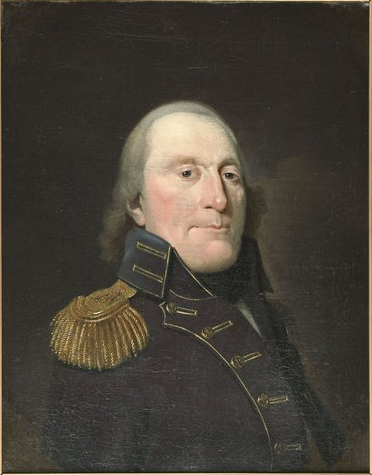
- Self portrait 1802
- Born: Thomas Gaal ca. 1739; Dendermonde, Belgium
- Died: ca. 1817; Middelburg, Belgium
- Education: Brussels Royal Academy of Fine Arts
- Occupation: Painter
- Relatives: Pieter Gaal (son)

Thomas Gaal (ca. 1739–1817) was a North Netherlandish painter of portraits, birds, and flowers. He was born at Dendermonde. He fixed his residence at Middelburg, and was one of the founders and directors of the Academy in that town. J. Perkois, J. H. Koekkoek, and S. De Koster were his pupils. He died at Middelburg in 1817. The painter Pieter Gaal was his son.
