= Stephen Robert Koekkoek =

Painter from the Northern Netherlands (born in London) (1887–1934)

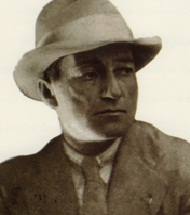
- Stephen Robert Koekkoek (1915)
- Born: 15 October 1887; London, England
- Died: 20 December 1934 (aged 47); Santiago, Chile
- Known for: Painting
- Movement: Post-Impressionism
- Parent: Hermanus Koekkoek the Younger (father)
- Relatives: Jan Koekkoek (uncle); member of the Koekkoek family

Stephen Robert Koekkoek (15 October 1887, in London – 20 December 1934, in Santiago) was an English-born painter of Dutch descent who worked in the Postimpressionist style. He was part of the Koekkoek family of painters.

== Biography ==
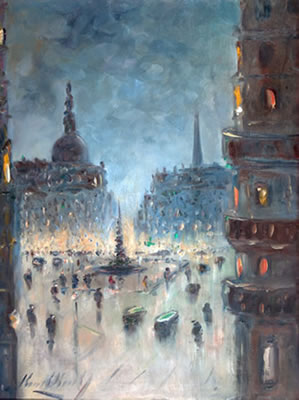
Trafalgar Square

His father was the maritime painter Hermanus Koekkoek the Younger, who had recently moved to London to establish an art gallery. He often travelled with him to the Netherlands, where he worked with other members of the family; especially his uncle, Jan Koekkoek, who strongly influenced his brush style. He also spent a short time in Canada.

In 1909, after his father died, he moved to South America and went to Bolivia, where he briefly attempted to become a mining entrepreneur. He continued on to Valparaíso where he taught English. Finally, he settled in Mendoza, Argentina, where he married the sister of painter Roberto Azzoni (1899–1989) and had a son. The marriage did not last very long, however, and he moved again; to Buenos Aires, where he shared an apartment with an aspiring poet named Jorge Uribe Escobar (1886–1919) and gained a reputation for eccentricity. He always wore a vest and a Stetson hat, carried a fancy cane, usually smoked a cigar, and was known as a heavy drinker who apparently liked his alcohol with a dash of Worcestershire sauce. When his friend Uribe committed suicide, he became depressed, turned to drugs and became a morphine addict. After 1926, he was often hospitalized in psychiatric institutions. While there, he got permission to continue painting and many of his works were bought by his doctors. He also proclaimed himself to be Napoleon, but that was probably intended as a joke.

He often had manic periods where he produced two or three paintings a day. His works were extremely popular in Chile and Argentina, especially Buenos Aires, where he exhibited frequently. It is said that he even paid his rent with paintings. In 1925, some of his works were purchased by Juan Peron when he was a Captain with the General Staff. One of his works was acquired by the Argentine government for presentation to the Prince of Wales. His popularity continues today. Since 1990, over 6,000 of his works have been sold, for an approximate figure of twenty-million dollars.

In 1933, he moved to Rosario, then on to Santiago. He died in 1934, at the age of forty-seven, in a hotel room, from an overdose of alcohol and drugs. It is not clear if this was accidental or a case of suicide. His friend, President Arturo Alessandri Palma, arranged for his burial. A major retrospective of his work was held in Córdoba in 2004.

== Selected paintings ==
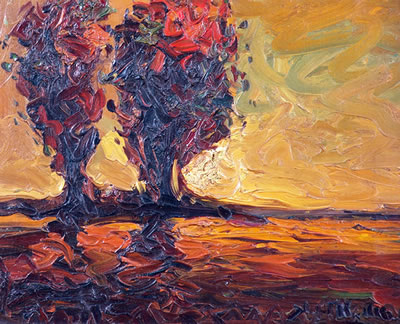
Landscape

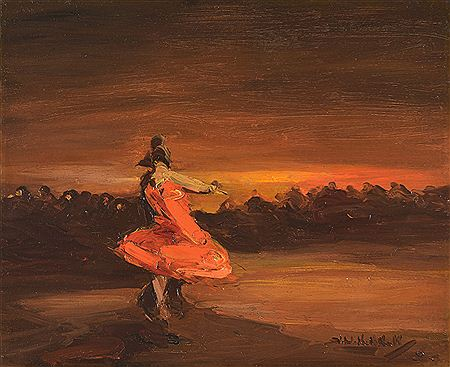
Pasodoble

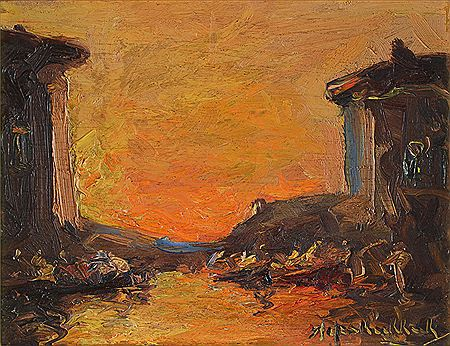
Sunset

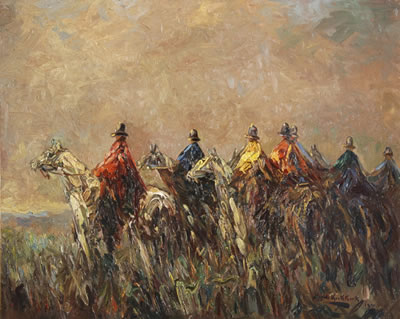
Riders on the Pampas
