= Willem Koekkoek =

Dutch painter (1839–1895)

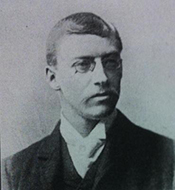
Willem Koekkoek (date unknown)

Willem Koekkoek (3 January 1839 – 29 January 1895) was a Dutch cityscape painter and marine artist.

== Life and work ==
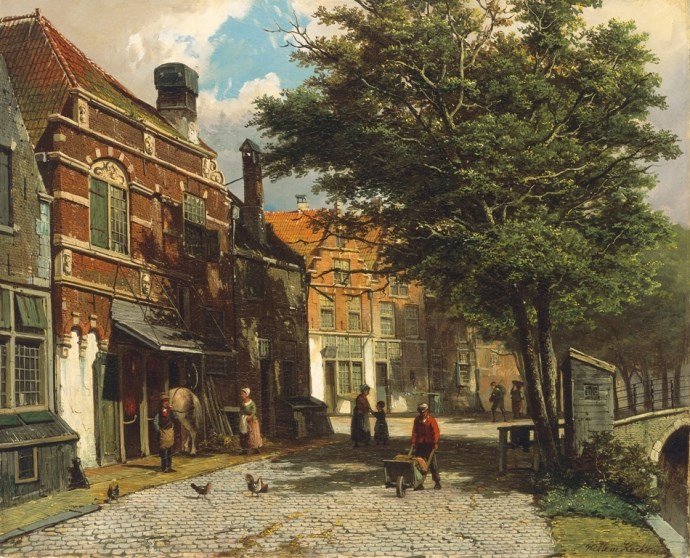
Dutch Town in the Summer

He was born in Amsterdam. He was a member of the famous Koekkoek painting family; son of the marine artist, Hermanus Koekkoek, and grandson of Johannes Hermanus Koekkoek. His brothers, Hermanus, Johannes Hermanus Barend, and Hendrik Barend all became painters.

Following in the family tradition, his father gave all four brothers their first art lessons. Willem also received training as an architect, but practiced that profession for only a short time. It did, however, leave a lasting influence on his choice of subject matter.

From 1854 to 1878, he worked in The Hague, then in Amsterdam. His first exhibition was in 1859, in Leeuwarden. From 1865 to 1894, he held annual showings at the Royal Academy of Art and the Rijksakademie in Amsterdam. He had several showings at private galleries in London from 1885 to 1888. His brother, Hermanus, had moved to London and opened an art dealership in 1869, which made his works, and those of the entire family, popular in England.

In November, 1866, he married Johanna Hermina. They had two sons who became artists, Marinus Adrianus, known as "The Younger", who became an illustrator, and Hermanus Willem, who specialized in military subjects. Once again, following tradition, Willem provided their first lessons.

Sometime in the 1880s, he relocated to Amstelveen. By then, his brother, Hendrik Barend, had moved to London, and his son, Hermanus, eventually did as well. Although Willem painted almost entirely for his English clientele, he remained in the Netherlands. He stopped exhibiting, and painted little, after 1894, due to ill health, and died the following year, shortly after turning fifty-six.

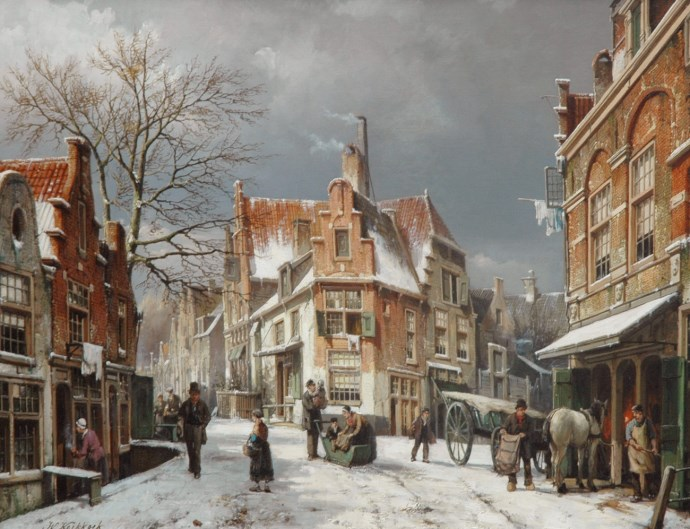
Winter in Enkhuizen
