= Hendrik Pieter Koekkoek =

Dutch landscape painter

- Born: Pieter Hendrik Koekkoek; 13 January 1843; Hilversum
- Died: 7 August 1927; Amsterdam

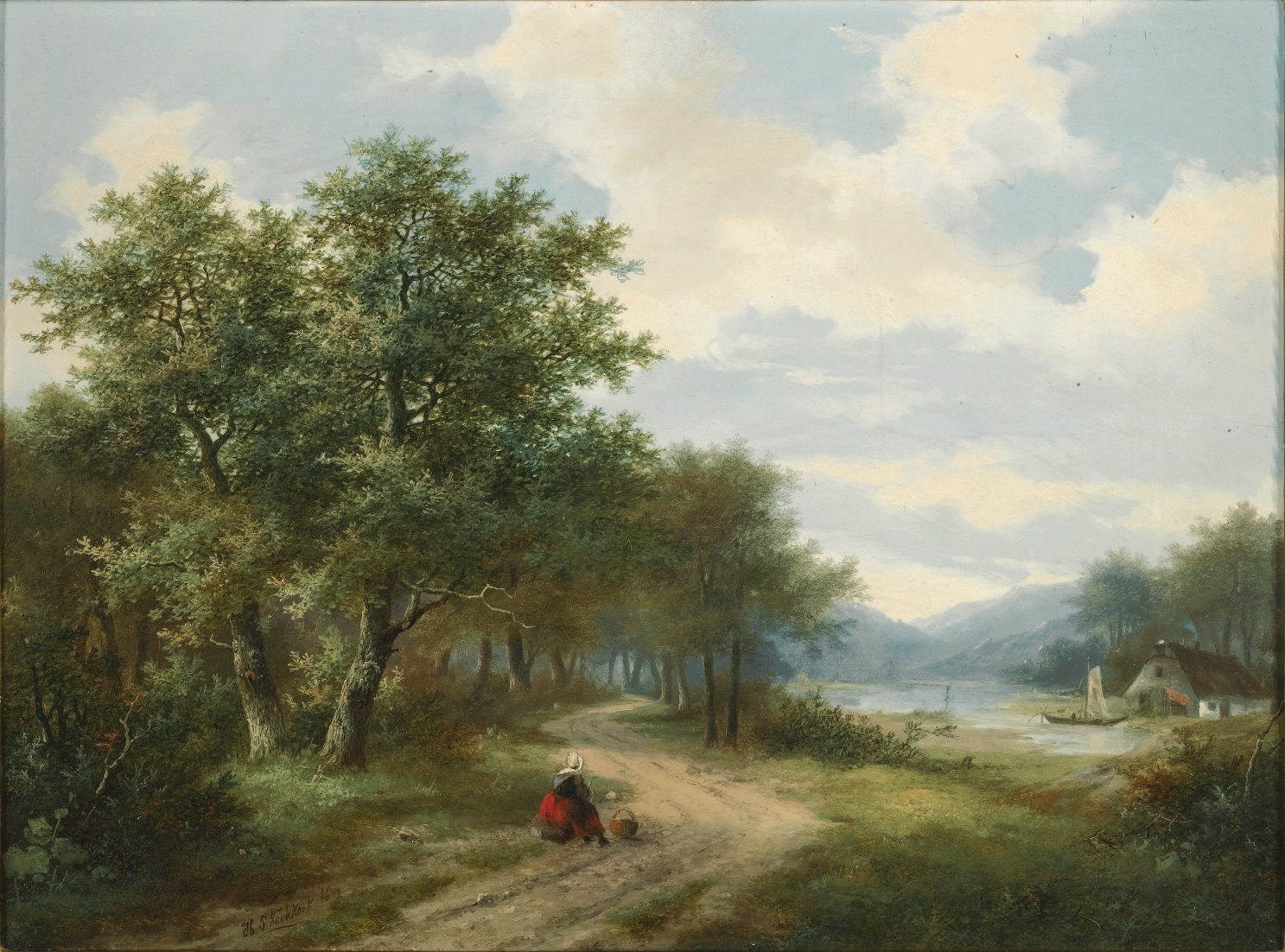
Summer Landscape

Pieter Hendrik Koekkoek (13 January 1843, Hilversum - 7 August 1927, Amsterdam) was a Dutch romanticist landscape painter. Because he signed his paintings "H. P. Koekkoek", he is usually referred to as Hendrik Pieter. He is part of the Koekkoek family of painters, being the son of the elder Marinus Adrianus Koekkoek.

== Life and work ==
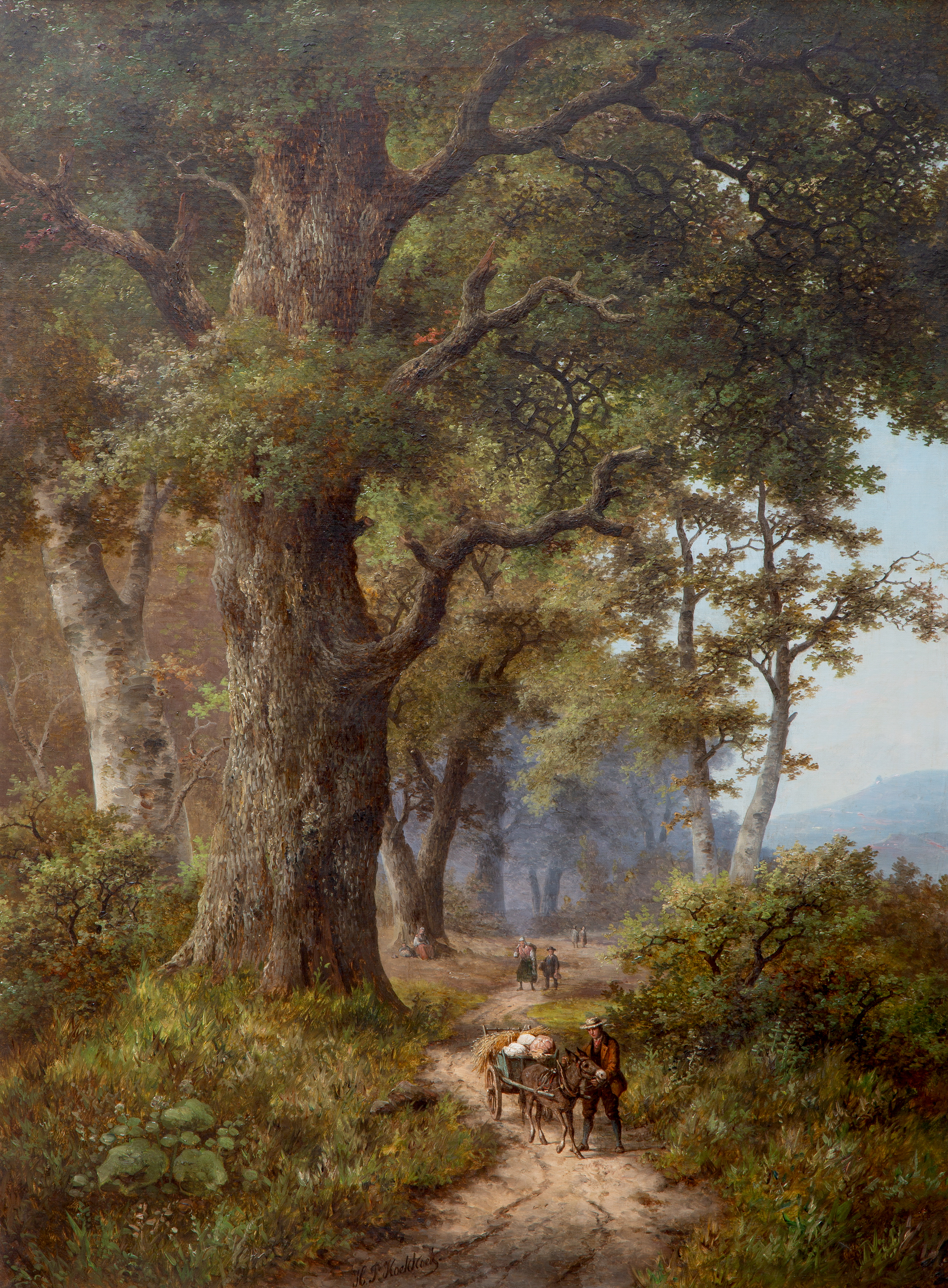
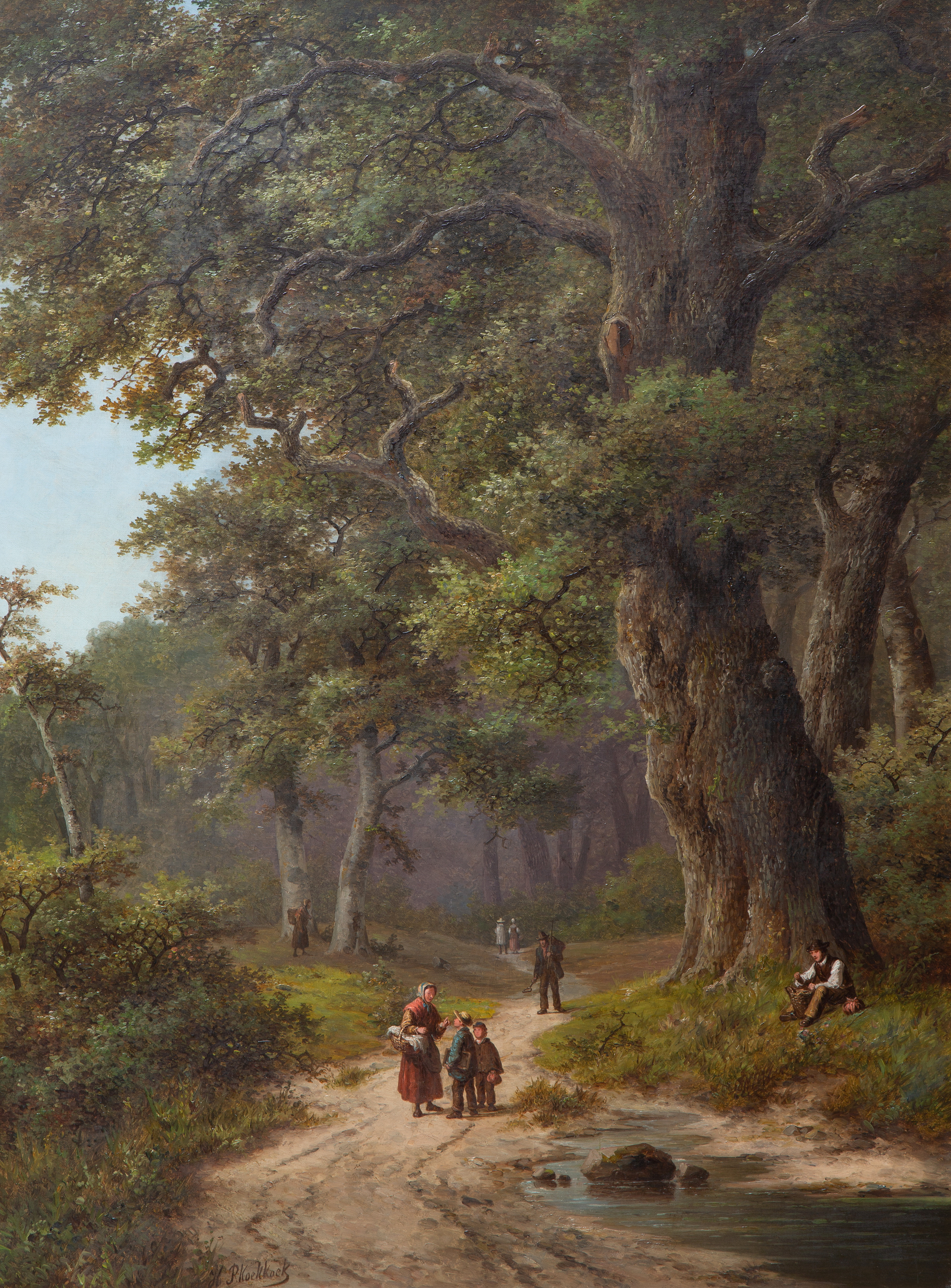
Two forest scenes by H.P. Koekkoek.

He was born into the famous Koekkoek family of painters as the son of the elder Marinus Adrianus Koekkoek and his wife Adriana Hendrika van Walt. They named him Pieter Hendrik, the same name they had given a previous child who had died, at the age of 7 months, a few months before the painter was born. Pieter Hendrik would later sign his work 'H.P.' rather than 'P.H.'.

His father, his three uncles, and his paternal grandfather were all painters, as would be many of his cousins among others in the extended family. His father gave him his first art lessons. At the beginning, in the 1860s and 1870s, he painted in the same style as his father; realism with romanticist elements. His subject matter was mostly forests and rivers. While his earlier works largely resemble those of his father, his later works were finer and more in the realistic style. He had a reputation for a love of nature that went beyond mere professional interest.

He worked throughout the Netherlands, alternating his base between Amsterdam and The Hague. He also made long, frequent trips to London, where his cousin, Hermanus (known as "The Younger"), owned an art dealership. Much of his work was sold in England. His exact whereabouts throughout the years are not fully known. Although he married Maria Balledux on 1 October 1874 in the city of Amsterdam, an exhibition he attended one month prior listed him as living in London. Two paintings presented there indicate Koekkoek visited Guildford. In 1883, husband and wife are recorded as moving from London to Tilburg, and briefly thereafter Arnhem; later, they appeared to mostly move between London and Amsterdam.

Different sources variously place his death in either the Netherlands or England, in 1890, after 1890, after 1901, or mention that it is unknown. However, the Amsterdam civil registry archives contain a deed recording that he died on 7 August 1927, in the city of Amsterdam.
