= Pieter Gaal =

Dutch painter

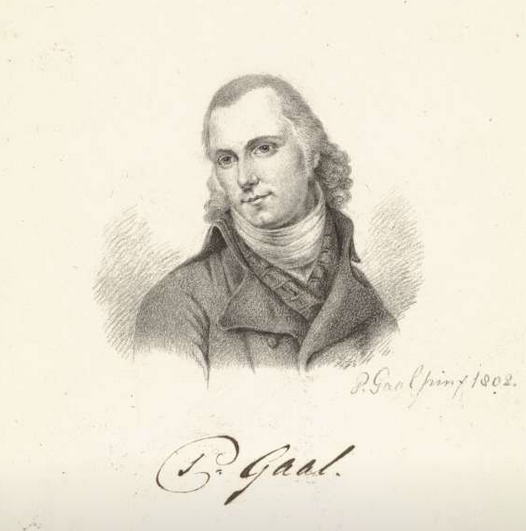
Self-portrait.

Pieter Gaal (19 July 1769 in Middelburg – 13 January 1819 in Middelburg) was a Dutch painter, the son of Thomas Gaal. Gaal came from a family of painters from the Zeeland area of the Netherlands, his earliest ancestor was a knight called Florens Ghale van Hoesbroec, though his father was born in what is now Belgium. His son Jacobus Cornelis Gaal was also a painter, painting portraits such as "Junges Madchen in Weissen Kleid Beim Einkleid" a portrait of a young woman being dressed by a maidservant. Gaal's main focus were "landscapes with cattle and figures furnished, a hobby portraits, living and dead game and genre pieces". He spent time in London (1789–1791), studied in Paris (at the Académie des Beaux-Arts de l'Institut de France in 1791), and traveled to paint in Italy, Switzerland and Germany.
