= Malayotyphlops koekkoeki =

Conservation status
- Data Deficient (IUCN 3.1)

Scientific classification
- Kingdom: Animalia
- Phylum: Chordata
- Class: Reptilia
- Order: Squamata
- Suborder: Serpentes
- Family: Typhlopidae
- Genus: Malayotyphlops
- Species: M. koekkoeki

Binomial name
- Malayotyphlops koekkoeki (Brongersma, 1934)

Synonyms
- Typhlops koekkoeki Brongersma, 1934; Typhlops koekkoeki — McDiarmid, Campbell & Touré, 1999; Malayotyphlops koekkoeki — Hedges et al., 2014

Species of snake

Malayotyphlops koekkoeki, also known commonly as Koekkoek's blind snake or the Boenjoe Island worm snake, is a species of snake in the family Typhlopidae.

== Etymology ==
The specific name, koekkoeki, is in honor of Dutch scientific illustrator Marinus Adrianus Koekkoek (1873-1944).

== Geographic range ==
M. koekkoeki is found on the Indonesian island of Bunyu off the northeastern coast of Borneo.

== Behavior ==
M. koekkoeki is terrestrial, fossorial, and nocturnal.

== Reproduction ==
M. koekkoeki is oviparous.
