= Jacobus Cornelis Gaal =

Dutch painter and etcher (1796–1866)

- Born: 5 September 1796; Oost-Souburg, Netherlands
- Died: 20 December 1866 (aged 70); Kampen, Netherlands
- Occupations: Painter and Etcher

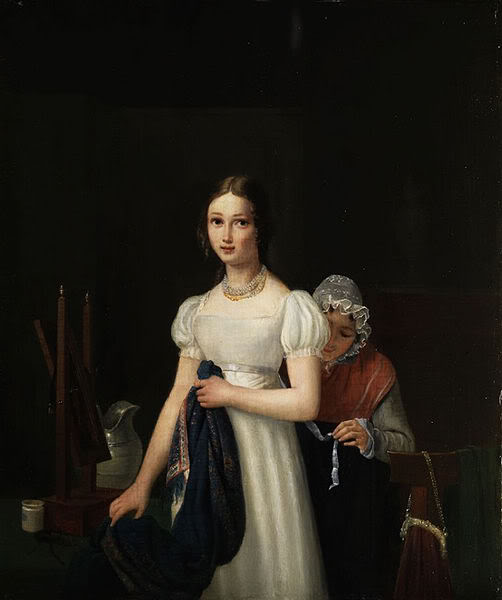

Jacobus Cornelis Gaal (5 September 1796 in Oost-Souburg – 20 December 1866 in Kampen) was a Dutch painter and etcher.

Gaal was born in East Souburg, the son of Pieter Gaal (1769–1819) and Richardina Jacob van Eps (1765–1813). He was born to a family of painters and etchers.

A pupil of his own father, Gaal's focus were portraits and manufacturing miniatures including one of his father, Pieter. Some of his paintings were displayed in exhibitions in Middelburg 1822, Amsterdam 1852, and The Hague 1853. He painted portraits of King William I and King William II. His portrait of a young woman being dressed by a maidservant, "Junges Madchen in Weissem Kleid Beim Ankleiden" was sold for US$4000.

During his life he made several trips down the Rhine.

On 16 July 1819 he married Cornelia Petronella Hofstede.
