= William Hugonet =

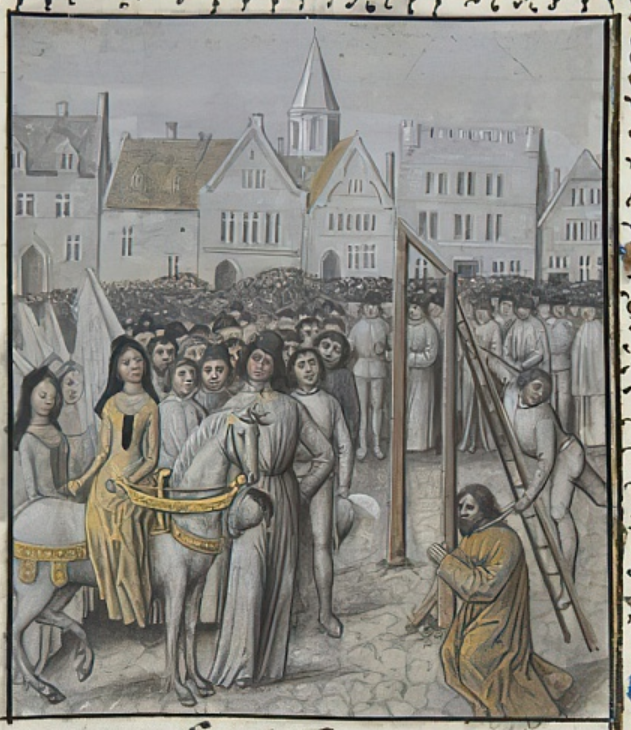
Execution of William Hugonet, miniature from 1477 by the Master of Mary of Burgundy

William Hugonet (French: Guillaume Hugonet, Dutch: Willem Hugonet, died 3 April 1477) was chancellor of Charles the Bold, the Duke of Burgundy. After the death of Charles the Bold, he was imprisoned along with Guy de Brimeu, Lord of Hambercourt. The two were beheaded on 3 April 1477. by citizens of Ghent, who blamed him for policies undermining the position of the urban elites during his time as chancellor.

== Biography ==
Hugonet came from a non-noble family from Mâcon, and was educated in law at the university. In 1455 he entered the service of Philip the Good. In 1467 he married Louise de Layé, who came from an aristocratic family in Beaujolais. After the death of Philip the Good, his son Charles the Bold became Duke of Burgundy. During his reign, the career of Hugonet was further advanced and in 1471 he was ennobled and promoted to chancellor, or head of the administration, of Burgundy. He acquired several titles and the lordship of Middelburg, as well as houses in Mechelen, Brussels and Bruges. Following the death of the Duke at the Battle of Nancy, Hugonet was imprisoned, and in 3 April 1477 executed, by the citizens of Ghent, who blamed him for having reduced the independence and power of the urban elites during the reign of Charles the Bold.
