= Speculum Humanae Salvationis =

Illustrated work of popular theology in the late Middle Ages

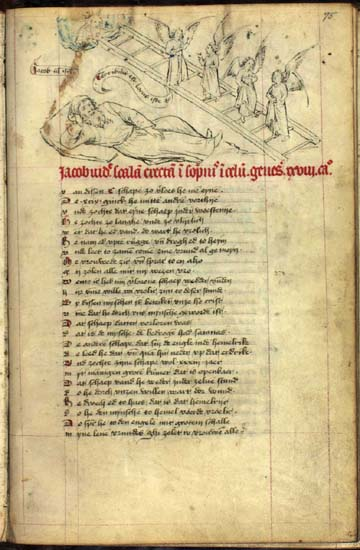
Jacob's Ladder from a Speculum of c. 1430, prefiguring the Ascension, right

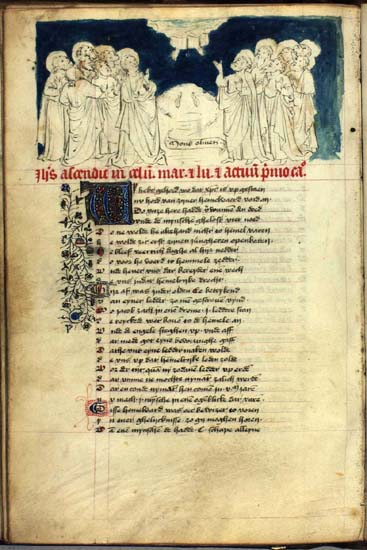
The Ascension from the same manuscript, see left. Danish Royal Library.

The Speculum Humanae Salvationis or Mirror of Human Salvation was a bestselling, anonymous, illustrated work of popular theology in the late Middle Ages, part of the genre of encyclopedic speculum literature, in this case concentrating on the medieval theory of typology, whereby the events of the Old Testament prefigured or foretold the events of the New Testament. The original version is in rhyming Latin verse, and contains a series of New Testament events each with three Old Testament ones that prefigure it. It is one of the most common books found as an illuminated manuscript, and also in early printing in both blockbook and incunabulum forms.

== Contents ==
After a short Prologue (two pages) and Prohemium (four), both unillustrated, the first two chapters deal with the Creation, the Fall of Satan, the story of Adam and Eve, and the Deluge in four pages. Then follow forty more double-page chapters where a New Testament event is compared with three from the Old Testament, with four pictures each above a column of text. Usually, each chapter occupies one 2-page opening. The last three chapters cover the Seven Stations of the Cross and the Seven Joys and Sorrows of Mary at double this length. In all, a complete standard version has 52 leaves, or 104 pages, and 192 illustrations (including a blank page at the beginning and end). The blockbook editions were much shorter, with 116 pictures, two to a woodblock.

The writing of the text follows an exact scheme: twenty-five lines per column, with two columns per page, one under each miniature, so a hundred lines per standard chapter. Sometimes there are captions over the pictures as well, of varying content. Many copies reduced the original text, often by omitting the non-standard chapters at the beginning or end, whilst others boosted the content with calendars and commentaries or extra illustrations.

== Dating and manuscript copies ==
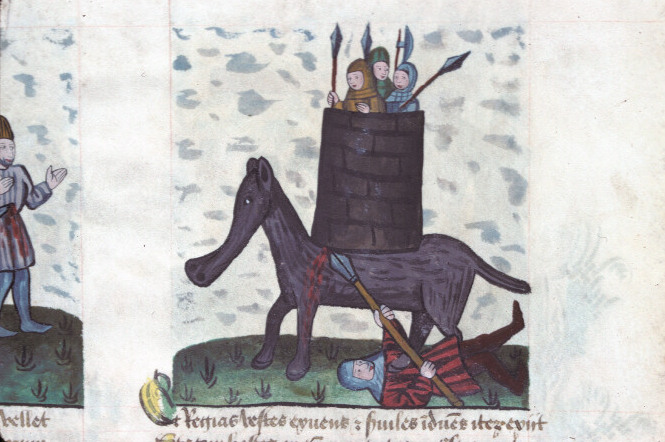
Miniature from a manuscript Speculum. Eleazar Maccabeus kills the elephant and is crushed.

The work originated between 1309, as a reference to the Pope being at Avignon indicates, and 1324, the date on two copies. A preface, probably from the original manuscript, says the author does not give his name out of humility, though numerous suggestions have been made. He was almost certainly a cleric, and there is evidence he was a Dominican. Ludolph of Saxony is a leading candidate for authorship, and Vincent of Beauvais has also been suggested.

The first versions are naturally in illuminated manuscript form, and in Latin. Many copies were made, and several hundred still survive (over 350 in Latin alone), often in translations into different vernacular languages; at least four different translations into French were made, and at least two into English. There were also translations into German, Dutch, Czech (Zrcadlo člověčieho spasenie), and Croatian (Zrcalo člověčaskago spasenja). Czech and Croatian translations are the only ones into Slavic languages.

Manuscript versions covered the whole range of the manuscript market: some are lavishly and expensively decorated, for a de luxe market, whilst in many the illustrations are simple, and without colour. In particular, superb Flemish editions were produced in the 15th century for Philip the Good and other wealthy bibliophiles. The Speculum is probably the most popular title in this particular market of illustrated popular theology, competing especially with the Biblia pauperum and the Ars moriendi for the accolade.

== Printed editions ==
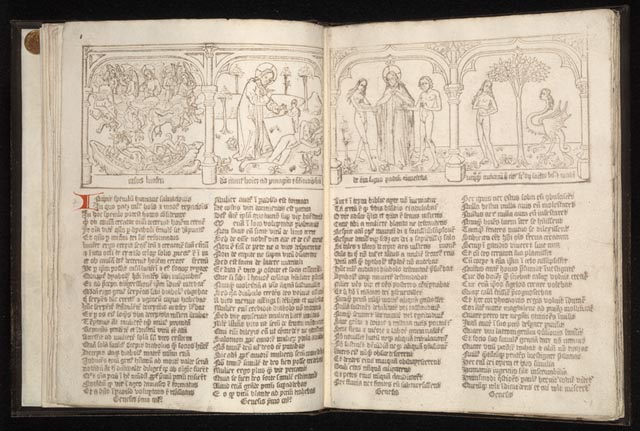
Opening from a mixed blockbook and movable type Netherlandish edition, c. 1470

In the 15th century, with the advent of printing, the work then appeared in four blockbook editions, two in Latin and two in Dutch, and then in sixteen incunabulum editions by 1500. The blockbooks present unique questions as only editions of this work combine hand-rubbed woodcut pages with text pages printed in movable type. Further eccentricities include a run of twenty pages in one edition which are text cut as a woodcut, based on tracings of pages from another edition printed with movable type. Though the circumstances of production of these editions are unknown, two of the editions are in Dutch and the Netherlands was probably the centre of production, as with most blockbooks. Hind places them in Holland, from about 1470–75. It appears the Prohemium may have been sold separately as a pamphlet, as one version speaks of the usefulness of it for "poor preachers who cannot afford the entire book".

The incunabulum editions, from eleven different presses, mostly, but not all, printed their woodcut illustrations in the printing press with the text. Some seem to have been printed in two sessions for texts and images. Günther Zainer of Augsburg, a specialist in popular illustrated works, produced the first one in 1473, in Latin and German, and with a metrical summary newly added for each chapter; this is considered an especially beautiful edition. Further incunabulum editions include Latin, German, French, Spanish and Dutch versions, and it was the first illustrated book printed in both Switzerland, at Basel, and France, at Lyon, which used the Basel picture blocks, later also used in Spain. A Speyer edition has woodcuts whose design has been attributed to the Master of the Housebook. In addition, the first of the somewhat legendary editions supposedly produced by Laurens Janszoon Coster, working earlier than Johannes Gutenberg, was a Speculum. Even if the Coster story is ignored, the work seems to have been the first printed in the Netherlands, probably in the early 1470s. Editions continued to be printed until the Reformation, which changed the nature of religious devotion on both sides of the Catholic/Protestant divide, and made the Speculum seem outdated.

== Iconographic influence ==
The images in the Speculum were treated in many different styles and media over the course of the two centuries of its popularity, but generally the essentials of the compositions remained fairly stable, partly because most images had to retain their correspondence with their opposite number, and often the figures were posed to highlight these correspondences. Many works of art in other media can be seen to be derived from the illustrations; it was for example, the evident source for depictions for the Vision of Augustus in Rogier van der Weyden's Bladelin Altarpiece and other Early Netherlandish works. In particular the work was used as a pattern-book for stained glass, but also for tapestries and sculpture.

== Sources ==
- Eterović, Ivana (2020). "Martina KRAMARIĆ, Zrcalo člověčaskago spasenja (1445.): Transkripcija, kontekst nastanka i jezičnopovijesna analiza". Slovo. 71: 260–263.
- Hind, Arthur M. (1935). An Introduction to a History of Woodcut, Houghton Mifflin Co., reprinted Dover Publications, (1963). ISBN 0-486-20952-0, pp. 245–247 and passim.
- Kramarić, Martina (2019). Zrcalo člověčaskago spasenja (1445.). Transkripcija, kontekst nastanka i jezičnopovijesna analiza. Zagreb: Institut za hrvatski jezik i jezikoslovlje. ISBN 978-953-7967-24-6.
- Mayor, A. Hyatt (1971). Prints and People, Metropolitan Museum of Art/Princeton. nos.33,34. ISBN 0-691-00326-2.
- Reinhart, Johannes (2000). "Husova homilija na 13. nedjelju po Duhovima u hrvatskoglagoljskom prijevodu". Slovo. 50: 119-190.
- Wilson, Adrian, and Joyce Lancaster Wilson (1984). A Medieval Mirror. Berkeley: University of California Press. online edition Includes many illustrations, including a full set of woodcut pictures with notes in Chapter 6.
