= Pieter Bladelin =

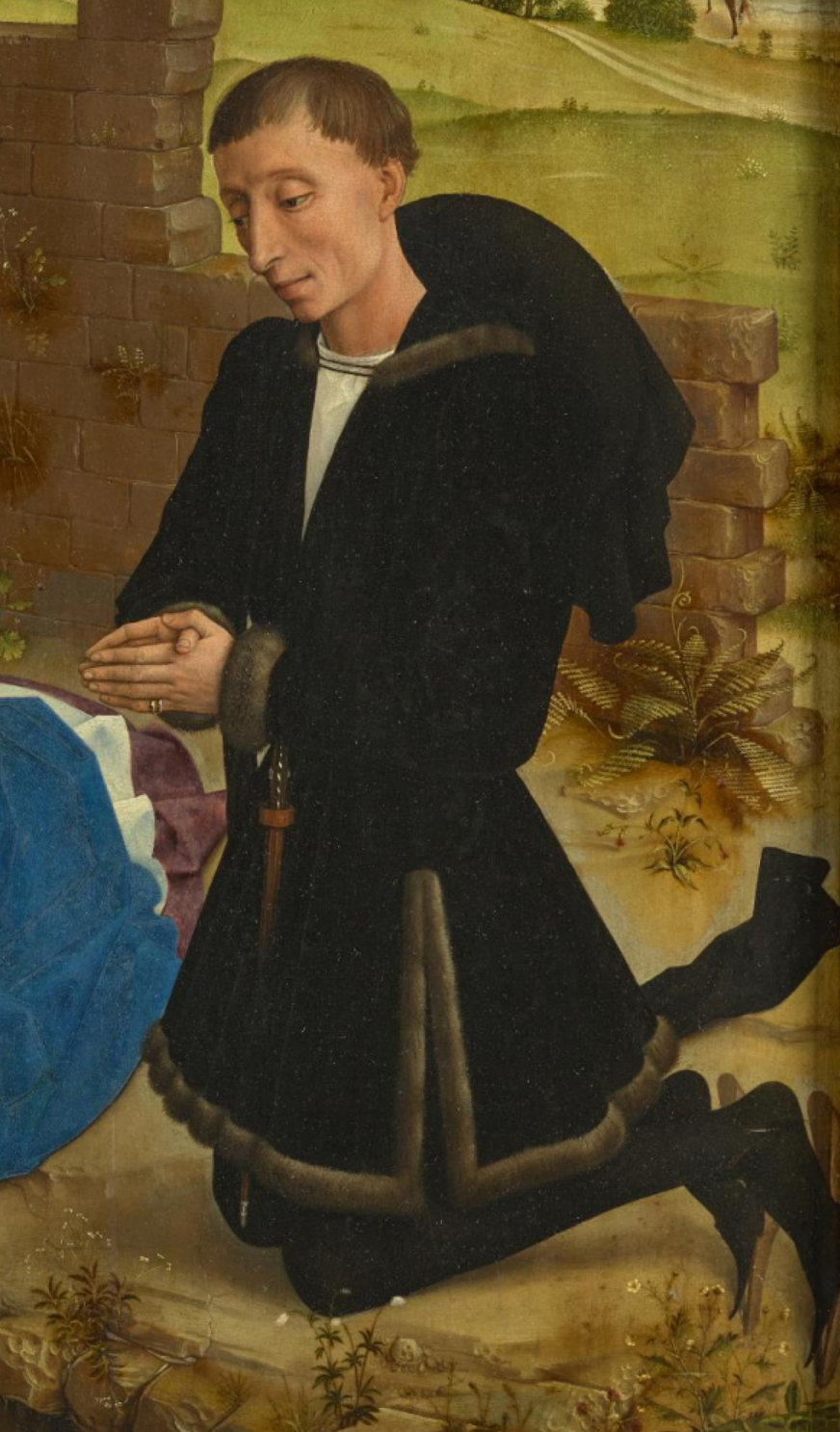
- Portrait of Bladelin on the van der Weyden altarpiece
- Born: Pieter de Leestemakere in or before 1408; Bruges
- Died: 8 April 1472
- Occupations: Financial advisor; civil servant
- Known for: Building the Hof Bladelin;developing the town of Middelburg
- Spouse: Margaretha van de Vagheviere (m. c. 1435)
- Parent(s): Pieter de Leestemakere, Elizabeth Hugheleins
- Relatives: Margareta (sister)

Pieter Bladelin (born Pieter de Leestemakere in or before 1408, Bruges - 8 April 1472) was an important financial advisor and civil servant to the Burgundian State. He was lord of Middelburg and built the Hof Bladelin in Bruges.

== Life ==
=== Early life ===
He was the son of the crane-operator Pieter de Leestemakere (died 1433) and Elizabeth Hugheleins (died before 1418). His father worked as a crane-operator in Bruges, although the family was from Veurne. In 1430 Bladelin was recorded as the eleventh member of Bruges' city council and four years later he had risen to its fifth member. In or around 1435 he married Margaretha van de Vagheviere (1414, Bruges - 5 May 1476, Middelburg), daughter of Jan van de Vagheviere and Margareta de Vrient - the marriage proved childless. He built Hof Bladelin on Naaldenstraat in Bruges from 1435 onwards.

From 1436 to 1438 he was Bruges' city treasurer, but in 1436 he also acted as an intermediary between the city and Philip the Good after it revolted against the Duke. In 1438, towards the end of the revolt, he was granted gros briefs by the Duke and on 1 January 1441 he was recorded as his general recipient of finance. In 1444 he is recorded as the duchy's treasurer and governor of finance - he was now also on the Grote Raad as a financial advisor. In 1447 he was named the next treasurer of the Order of the Golden Fleece and took on the role four years later on the death of its previous holder, Guy de Guilbert.

=== Burgundy ===
The Duke often appointed him as a commissioner to chair committees on legal reform in the cities. He also maintained his diplomatic skills, mediating between the Duke and Ghent when it rebelled in 1452-1453 and between Bruges and Brugse Vrije. He was also sent to England and France on diplomatic business and became a major patron of the arts.

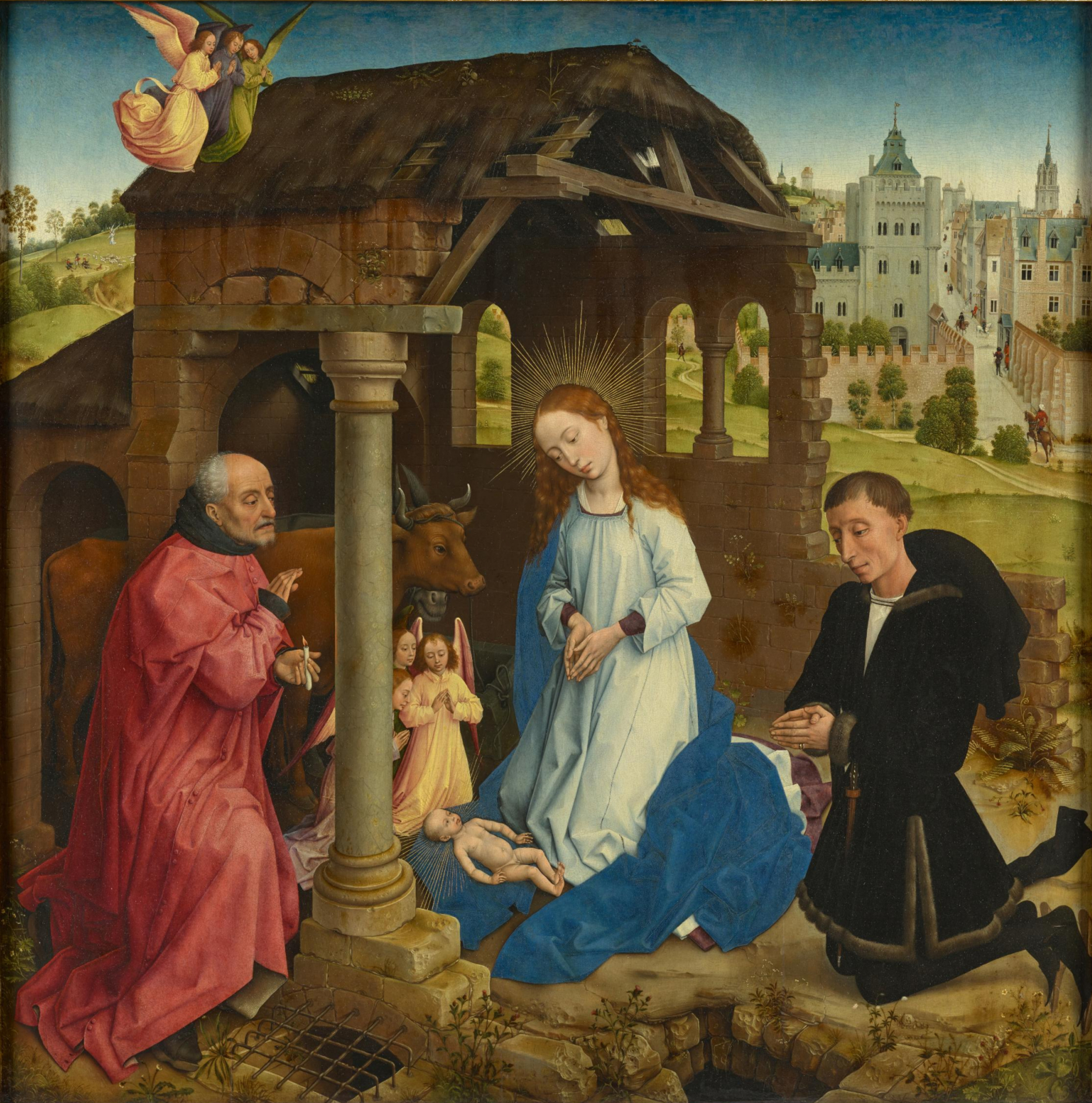
Painting commissioned by Bladelin from Rogier van der Weyden, showing the donor in the bottom right.

His sister Margareta (died 1449) was married to Colaard de Fever, who was from a family of wealthy money changers and royal officials and who bought properties and lands belonging to Middelburg Abbey in 1433, in an economically-important area on the road between Bruges and Aardenburg. Bladelin bought these from Colaard in 1440 and also expanded them by buying adjacent plots. In 1444 Philip the Good promoted Bladelin's lands into a lordship and Bladelin built a castle, which became his summer residence from 1450 onwards and appeared in the background of the 1460 triptych he commissioned from Rogier van der Weyden.

He also began construction on the new town of Middelburg in 1452, which was largely completed by 1465. He built it a collegiate church, dedicated in 1460, to which he donated a relic of the True Cross he had obtained from Wouter Utenhove, hoping to turn the church into a pilgrimage site. He also built the town a monastery, guesthouse, rampart and drainage canal to the Lieve and in 1458 was authorised to appoint a town council of seven aldermen and a mayor, followed by permission to hold a free annual market seven years later. He even hosted Charles the Bold, Margaret of York and Mary of Burgundy in the town for a few weeks in June 1470.

=== Death ===
He was usually entitled a 'high and mighty lord', a title used only by members of the high nobility, but his lack of children meant he had nobody to pass his lordship onto. He was buried in front of the high altar in the church he had built in Middelburg, joined a few years later by his widow, who had been allowed to continue ruling the lordship by Charles the Bold. On her death Bladelin's will of 13 March 1472 came into effect, passing the estates in Middelburg to the descendants of Margareta and Colaard. Margareta had two daughters, Margaretha, who was married to Jan III de Baenst, and Elisabeth, who was married to Joos I van Varsenare. Joos I's son Joos II and Jan III could not agree how to divide the property and took the dispute to law.

However, the dispute became so desperate that immediately after the death of Margareta the elder they agreed to sell Middelburg to William Hugonet, chancellor of Burgundy. Nothing remains of the town of Middelburg except the church, which contains a copy of the van der Weiden altarpiece by Jan Ryckx - the original is now in the Gemäldegalerie, Berlin. Baron Philippe de Merode later gave the church's relic to Albert VII, Archduke of Austria and his wife Isabella, who thanked him by making him Count of Middelburg. Isabella left it in her will to the Church of St. Michael and St. Gudula (now Brussels' cathedral), which eventually sent a tiny sliver back to Middelburg. Hof Bladelin in Bruges was sold to the Florentine Medici family, who set up a branch there under the management of Tommaso Portinari and put in medallions showing family busts.

== Bibliography ==
- (in Dutch) K. VERSCHELDE, Geschiedenis van Middelburg in Vlaanderen, Brugge, 1867.
- (in Dutch) K. VERSCHELDE, Testament de Pierre Bladelin (...), in : Handelingen Genootschap voor geschiedenis te Brugge, 1879, blz.1-32
- (in Dutch) G. MILIS-PROOST, Pieter Bladelin, in: Nationaal Biografisch Woordenboek, Deel 2, Brussel, 1966, col. 61-63.
- (in Dutch) Gabrielle CLAEYS, Het Hof Bladelin te Brugge, Brugge, 1988
- (in Dutch) M. MARTENS, Pieter Bladelin en Middelburg in Vlaanderen, Middelburg, 1994
- (in Dutch) Jan DUMOLYN, De Brugse opstand van 1436-1438, Heule, 1997
- (in Dutch) M. MARTENS, Nieuwe biografische gegevens over Pieter Bladelin, in: Jaarboek van de heemkundige kring Het Ambacht van Maldegem, 1999, blz. 244-250.
- (in Dutch) Pieter A. DONCHE, De familie Bladelin in de kasselrij Veurne van 1230 tot de 16e eeuw, in: Vlaamse Stam, 2000, blz. 353-382
- (in Dutch) Jan DUMOLYN, Het hogere personeel van de hertogen van Bourgondië in het graafschap Vlaanderen (1419-1477), doctoraatsverhandeling (onuitgegeven), Universiteit Gent, 2001
- (in Dutch) Jan DUMOLYN, Staatsvorming en vorstelijke ambtenaren in het graafschap Vlaanderen (1419-1477), Antwerpen, 2003
- (in Dutch) M. MARTENS, Aanvullingen bij de biografie van Pieter Bladelin, in: Jaarboek van de heemkundige kringHet Ambacht van Maldegem, 2004.
- (in Dutch) Pieter A. DONCHE, De familie Bladelin te Brugge, in: Vlaamse Stam, 2007, blz. 433-447.
- W. DE CLERCK, Jan DUMOLYN & Jelle HAEMERS, "Vivre noblement": material culture and elite identity in Late Medieval Flanders. The case of Peter Bladelin and William Hugonet, in: Journal of Interdisciplinary History, 2007, blz. 1-31.
- (in French) Jan DUMOLYN, Pouvoir d'État et enrichissement personnel: investissements et stratégies d'accumulation mis en oeuvre par les officiers des ducs de Bourgogne en Flandre, in: Le Moyen Age, 2008, blz. 67-92.
- (in Dutch) Frederic BUYLAERT, Eeuwen van ambitie. De adel in laatmiddeleeuws Vlaanderen, Brussel, 2010
- (in Dutch) Frederik BUYLAERT, Repertorium van de Vlaamse Adel, (ca. 1350-ca.1500), Gent, 2011
- (in Dutch) Pieter A. DONCHE, Edelen, leenmannen en vorstelijk ambtenaren van Vlaanderen, 1464 - 1481 - 1495, uitg. Donche, 2012
- (in Dutch) Jonas BRAEKEVELT, Pieter Bladelin, de Rijselse Rekenkamer en de stichting van Middelburg-in-Vlaanderen (ca. 1444-1472): de ambities van een opgeklommen hofambtenaar versus de bescherming van het vorstelijke domein, Brussel, 2012
