= Middelburg (Belgium) =

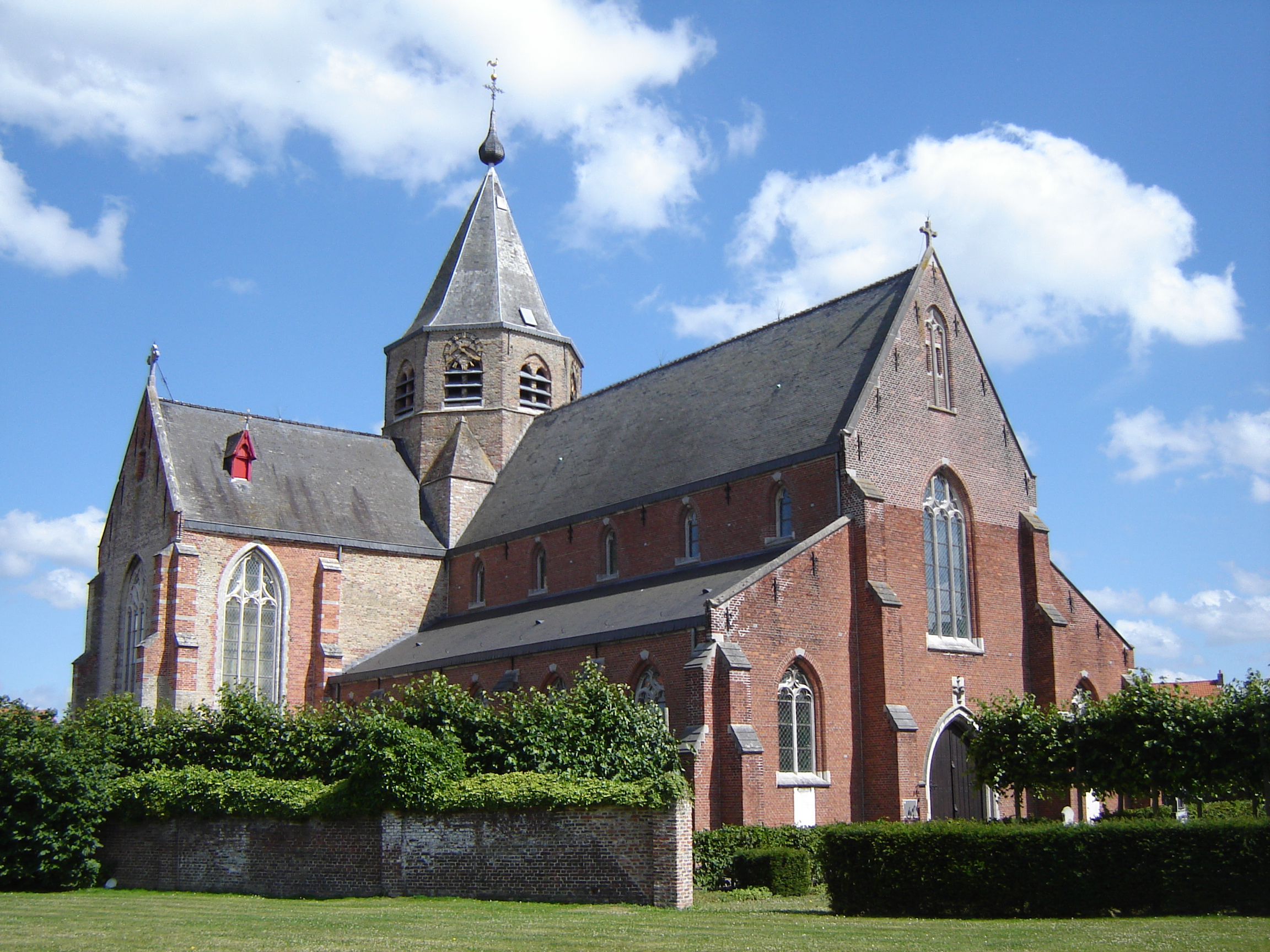
- Church of Saint Peter and Saint Paul, Middelburg

- Location within Belgium Location within Europe
- Coordinates: 51°15′18″N 03°24′57″E
- Country: Belgium
- Region: Flanders
- Province: East Flanders
- Municipality: Maldegem

Middelburg is a village and a district in the municipality of Maldegem, in East Flanders, Belgium. Founded as a town by Pieter Bladelin in the 15th century, it still contains the medieval church with the tomb of Bladelin and his wife.

== History ==
Middelburg was founded by Pieter Bladelin, a high-ranking official responsible for financial matters in the court of the Duke of Burgundy, Philip the Good. Bladelin had begun purchasing parcels of land in the area already in 1433, and in 1444 his holdings were united into a single fief and manor. After 1448, he built a castle and began developing the town according to a grid plan. Originally, the town had a moat, walls and town gates, as well as a town hall and a church dedicated to saints Peter and Paul (built 1452–1460). Bladelin invited craftsmen of copper from Dinant and tapestry-workers to settle in the town; the Duke of Burgundy ordered a tapestries from its workshops and Edward IV of England granted Middelburg trading rights in copper in 1472.

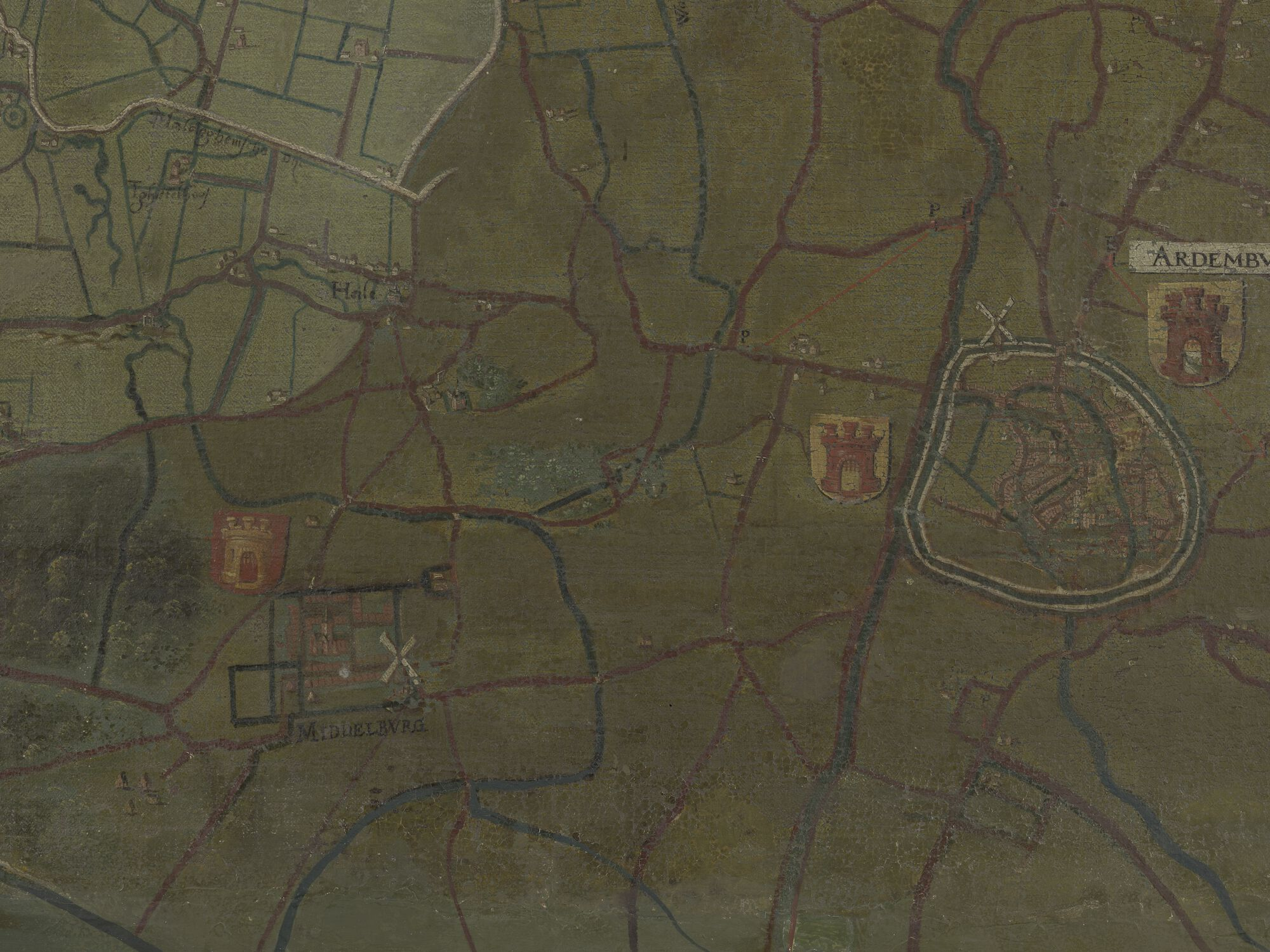
Middelburg during the Eighty Years' War on the map of the Liberty Of Bruges by Pieter Pourbus, 1571

After Bladelin's death, William Hugonet, another Burgundian official, became the new lord of Middelburg in 1476. Following the death of Charles the Bold, he was however imprisoned and the castle in Middelburg seized by troops from Bruges in 1477. Hugonet was shortly thereafter executed, and the fief passed to his descendants. However, the castle was again captured and partially destroyed by troops from Bruges in their struggle with the future Emperor Maximilian in 1488. During the Eighty Years' War it again changed hands several times and reduced to a state of ruin, after which it began to be dismantled by locals using it as a quarry. Today only the foundations remain.

== Appearance ==
The church was damaged during World War II, but its interior remains well-preserved. It contains the elaborately carved tomb of Pieter Bladelin and his wife, Margaret van de Vageviere, in addition to a polychrome altarpiece, a Rococo pulpit and a Baroque confessional. Of the original castle, only the foundations remain. The village still retains an unusual pillory made of stone, dating from the 18th century.
