= Marinus Adrianus Koekkoek =

Dutch painter (1807–1868)

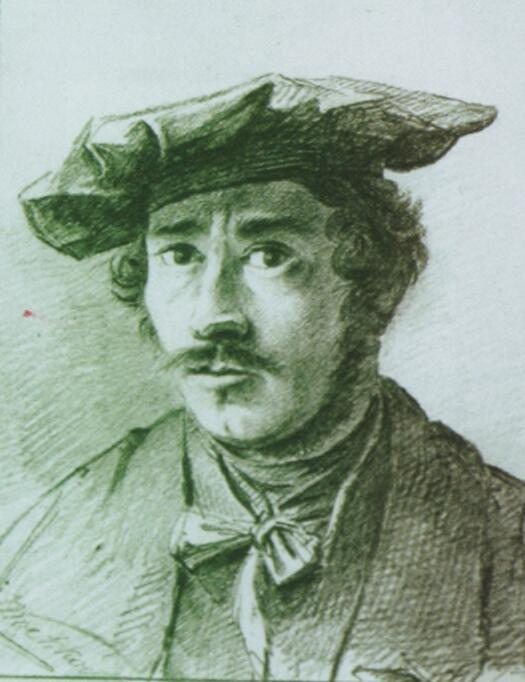
- Self-portrait (1841)
- Born: 25 September 1807; Middelburg
- Died: 28 January 1868 (aged 60); Amsterdam

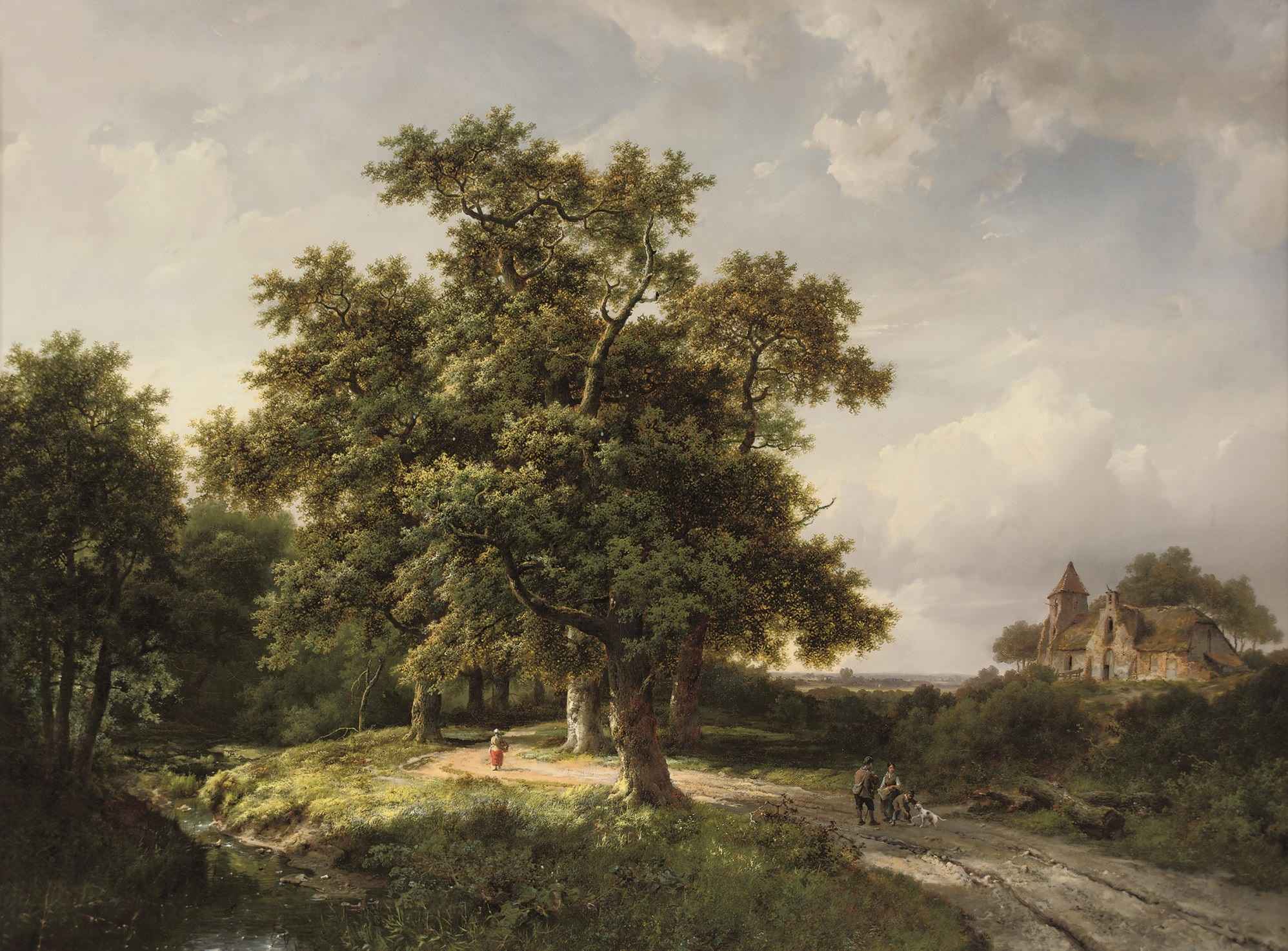
Figures on a Forest Path

Marinus Adrianus Koekkoek, sometimes referred to as The Elder (25 September 1807 – 28 January 1868) was a 19th-century Dutch landscape and marine painter.

== Life and work ==
He was a member of the famous Koekkoek family of painters; second son of the marine artist, Johannes Hermanus Koekkoek, brother of Barend Cornelis, Johannes, and Hermanus. His son was the landscape painter, Hendrik Pieter Koekkoek.

Marinus and his brothers received their first art lessons from their father, who provided advice and assistance throughout their careers. Initially, he worked as a decorative painter.

He established himself as a free-lance painter in Amsterdam in 1836. The following year, he moved to Kleef. From 1838, he alternated between Hilversum and Amsterdam. He finally settled in Amsterdam in 1854, and remained there until his death, aged sixty.

At first, he painted nothing but landscapes. Later, he expanded to portraits, animals, and maritime scenes.ne views. He was awarded a silver medal for his landscapes from the Felix Meritis society in 1847. Many of his works were sold in Germany and England.
