= Jan H. B. Koekkoek =

Dutch artist (1840–1912)

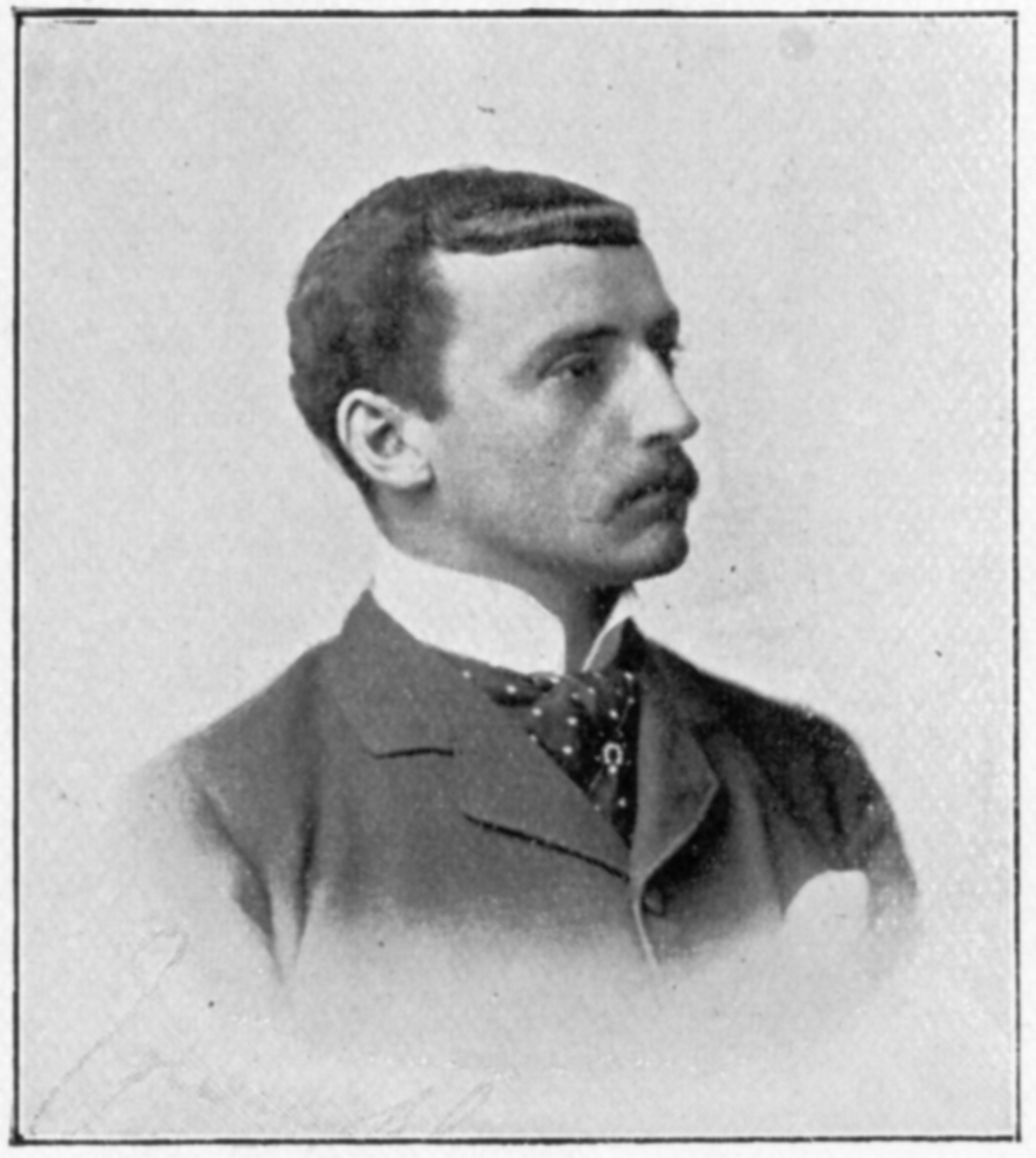
Johannes Hermanus Barend Koekkoek (1878)

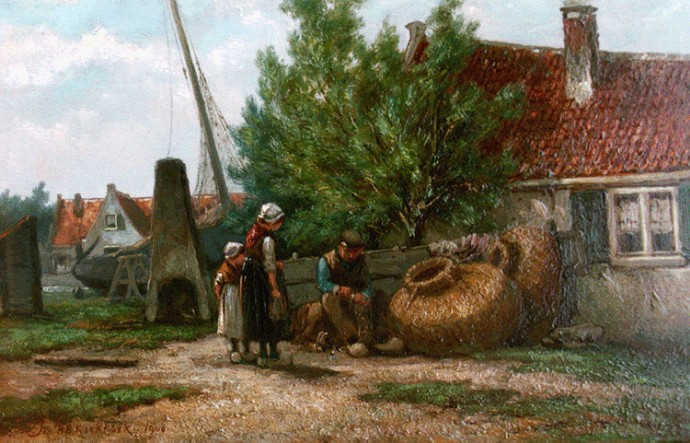
A Fishing Family in their Yard

Johannes Hermanus Barend Koekkoek (6 July 1840, Amsterdam - 24 January 1912, Hilversum) was a Dutch marine artist. He signed his paintings, and is perhaps better-known as, Jan H. B. Koekkoek.

== Life and work ==
He was a member of the famous Koekkoek family of painters; third son of the marine artist, Hermanus Koekkoek. His brothers, Willem, Hermanus, and Hendrik Barend also became painters. They all received their first art lessons from their father. He had his début at the Exhibition of Living Masters in 1859.

Most of his early works are in a style resembling his father's. Later, in 1864, he moved to Hilversum, where he came under the influence of the Laren School, then adopted stylistic elements from the Hague School. As a result, he came to favor relaxed scenes from the lives of fishermen and their families, rather than dramatic ocean views with ships.

He was married in 1877. Following family tradition, he tutored his son, Gerardus Johannes, who also painted landscapes and maritime scenes.

He was a member of Arti et Amicitiae, an artists' cooperative in Amsterdam. On their recommendation, he gave lessons to the landscape painter, Lion Schulman. His works may be seen at the Museum Jan Cunen in Oss, and the Rijksprentenkabinet.
