= Hermanus Koekkoek the Younger =

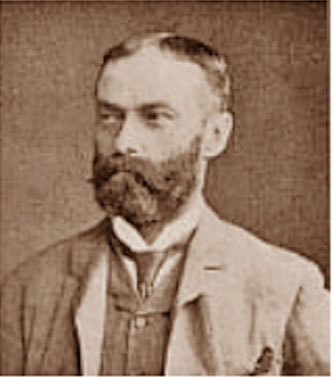
Hermanus Koekkoek (c. 1870)

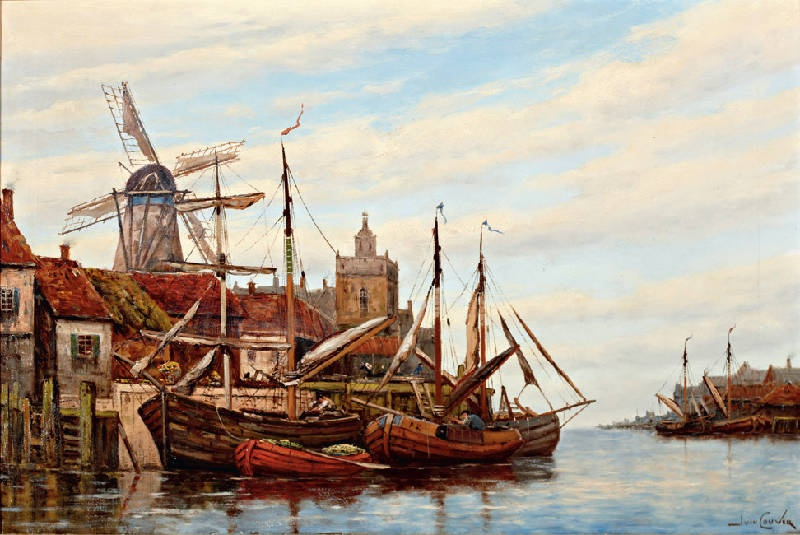
Eikendam (a river estuary)

Hermanus Koekkoek, known as The Younger (8 December 1836, Amsterdam - May 1909, London) was a Dutch marine artist, and art dealer.

== Life and work ==
He was part of the famous Koekkoek family of painters: grandson of Johannes Hermanus Koekkoek, nephew of the landscape painter, Barend Cornelis Koekkoek, and son of Hermanus Koekkoek the Elder. His son, Stephen Robert Koekkoek, also chose to become a painter.

Hermanus, together with his brothers, Willem, Johannes Hermanus Barend and Hendrik Barend, received his first art lessons from his father, who had recently settled in Amsterdam. In the 1860s, he began making regular visits to London and settled there in 1869. In addition to painting, he operated an art dealership; specializing in works by his family members. The great popularity of his uncle Barend, in England, owes much to his promotional efforts.

His own work focused on sea, river, and beach views, in a Realistic style with Romantic elements; much like most of his relatives. In his later years, he emphasized the realistic, dramatic elements, and was influenced by the Hague School. When selling his works in London, he sometimes used the pseudonyms "Jan van Couver" and "Louis van Straaten". He often collaborated with the landscape painter, Lion Schulman.

After his death, he was returned to The Hague for burial.

== Sources ==
- Benno Tempel, Ronald de Leeuw: Het Romantiek Boek. Waanders Uitgevers, Zwolle, 2006. ISBN 90-400-8942-6
- Brief biography @ Het Schildersgeslacht Koekkoek
