= Hermanus Koekkoek =

Dutch painter

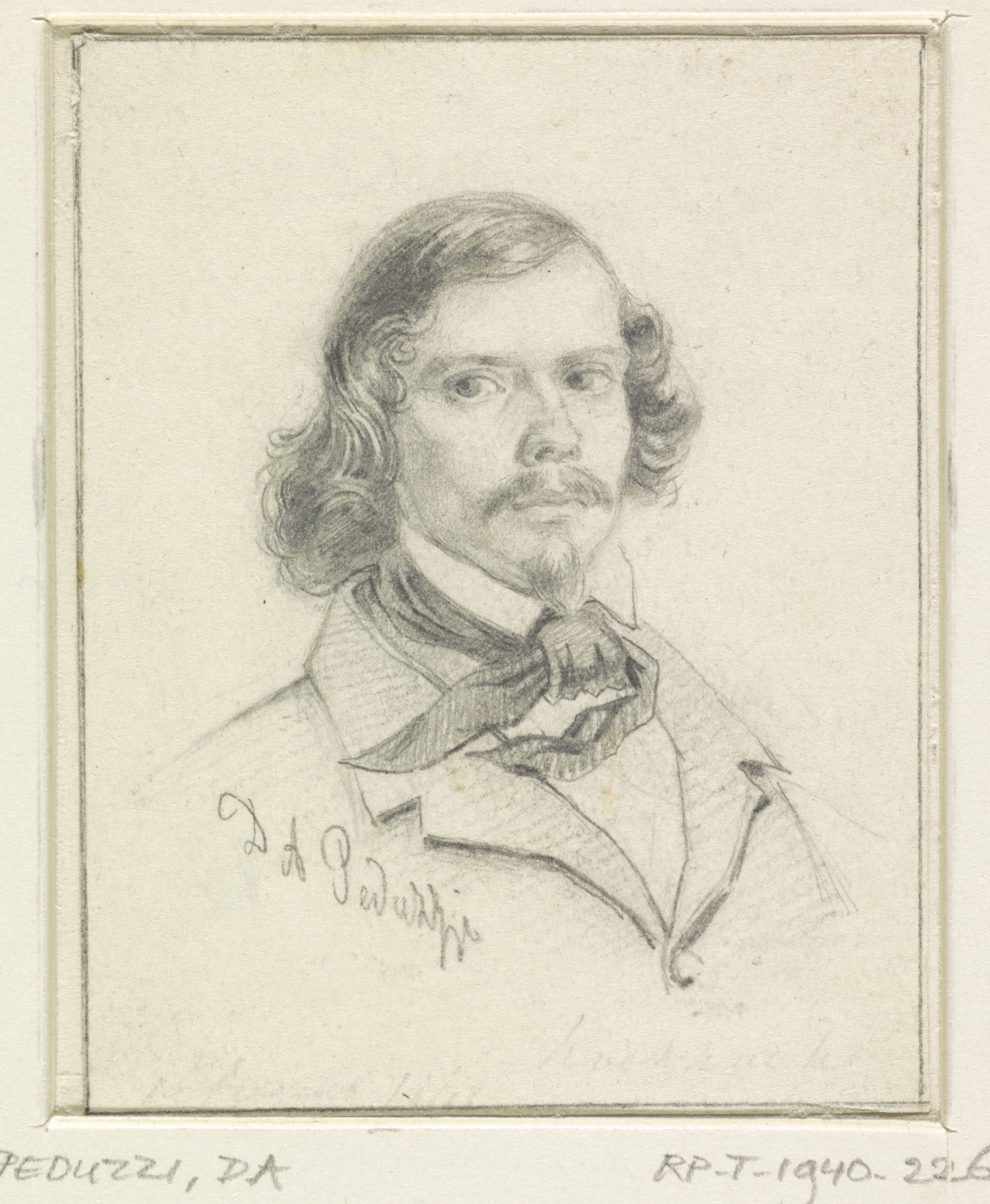
Hermanus Koekkoek, by Dominicus Anthonius Peduzzi (before 1860)

Hermanus Koekkoek, sometimes referred to as The Elder (13 March 1815, Middelburg – 5 November 1882, Haarlem) was a Dutch painter, etcher, and graphic artist. He specialized in marine art.

== Life and work ==
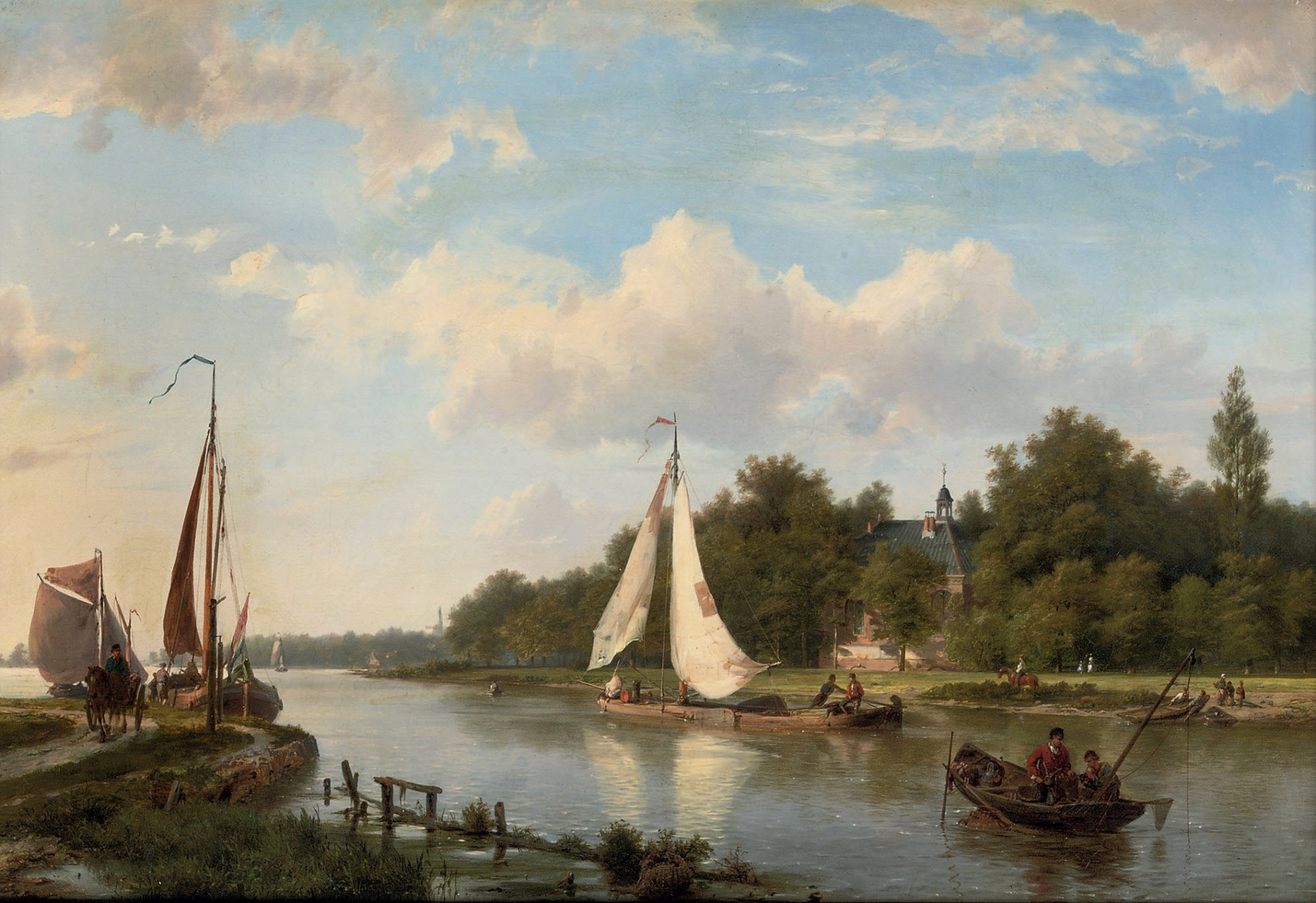
Along the River on a Sunny Afternoon

He was a member of the famous Koekkoek family of painters; the son of Johannes Hermanus Koekkoek, and brother of the landscape painters, Barend Cornelis, Johannes and Marinus Adrianus. His sons, Hermanus (the Younger), Willem, Johannes Hermanus Barend, and Hendrik Barend, all became painters. He also had three daughters.

His father specialized in marine art, and gave Hermanus his first art lessons. In 1826, his family moved to Durgerdam, near Amsterdam. Later, he went to Amsterdam, took classes at the Rijksakademie, and established himself as a free-lance artist. Like his father, he focused on marine art, although he also created numerous landscapes. His style was a combination of Realism, and the newer Romantic aesthetic. Influences from the artists of the Dutch Golden Age are clearly visible, as well.

He provided his four sons with their first painting lessons, as well as schooling his contemporary, the etcher Willem Gruyter, in the techniques peculiar to marine painting. His memberships included the Royal Academy of Art, and Arti et Amicitiae, an artists' society in Rotterdam. He won a gold medal at one of their exhibitions in 1875. Many of his works were sold in Germany and England.

In 1882 he moved to Haarlem. He died there that same year, aged sixty-seven. His works may be seen at the Teylers Museum, and the Museum Boijmans van Beuningen. The Rijksprentenkabinet of the Rijksmuseum Amsterdam has a collection of his drawings.

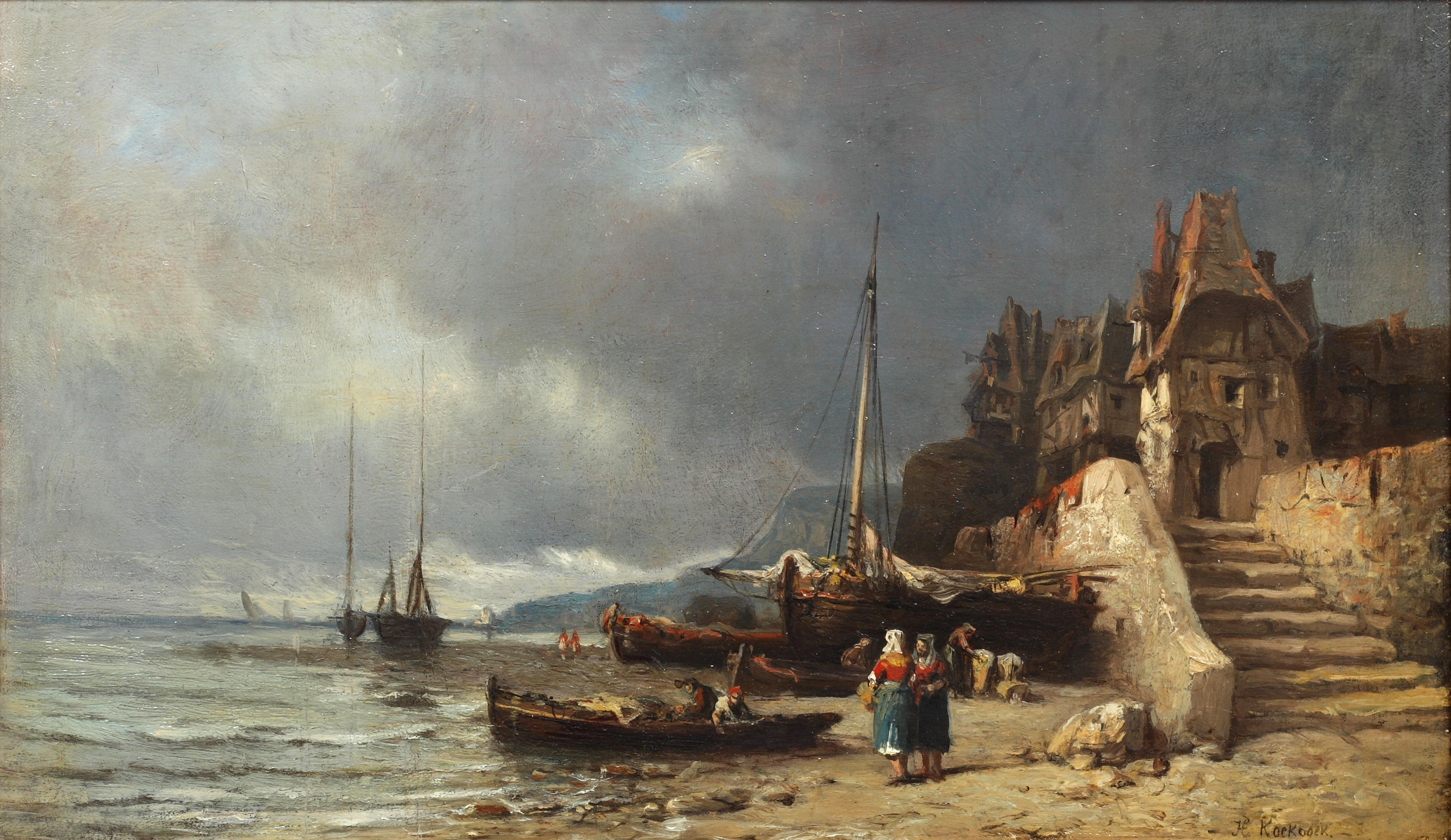
Coastal Scene Under Stormy Skies
