= Johannes Hermanus Koekkoek =

Dutch painter (1778–1851)

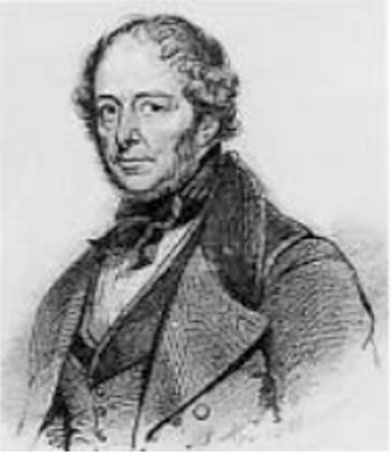
- Artist unknown, c. 1810
- Born: 17 August 1778; Veere
- Died: 9 January 1851 (aged 72); Amsterdam
- Known for: Marine artist

Johannes Hermanus Koekkoek (17 August 1778 – 9 January 1851) was a Dutch painter and draughtsman.

== Life and work ==
He was the founding father of what would become the famous Koekkoek family of painters. He and his wife, Anna née Koolwijk, had four sons who all became painters: Barend Cornelis, Marinus Adrianus, Johannes, and Hermanus. Most of his grandchildren and great-grandchildren would also follow careers in art.

Around 1800, he left his home and moved to Middelburg. There, he found work at a carpet and wallpaper factory owned by Thomas Gaal, a decorative painter, who gave him his first lessons. He also took classes at the Middelburg Drawing Academy, where he studied with plaster models and learned engraving. In 1803, he was honored with the title, "Primus van de Academie".

Following his education, he worked as an art teacher, but soon decided to become a free-lance artist. In 1826, he moved to Durgerdam, near Amsterdam, where he would live and work until 1833. He initially combined seascapes and cityscapes but, in his later years, focused entirely on ocean scenes. Much of his inspiration came from the painters of the Dutch Golden Age. His style was essentially Realistic, but also showed elements of the newer Romantic aesthetic. Rather than merely paint ships, he also learned as much as he could about the different types.

In 1833, he moved into Amsterdam, but also worked in Medemblik and Katwijk aan Zee. He died in Amsterdam, aged seventy-two. His works may be seen at the Rijksmuseum Amsterdam, the Dordrechts Museum, and the Museum Jan Cunen in Oss. Many of his paintings were sold to collectors in Germany and England.

== Selected paintings ==
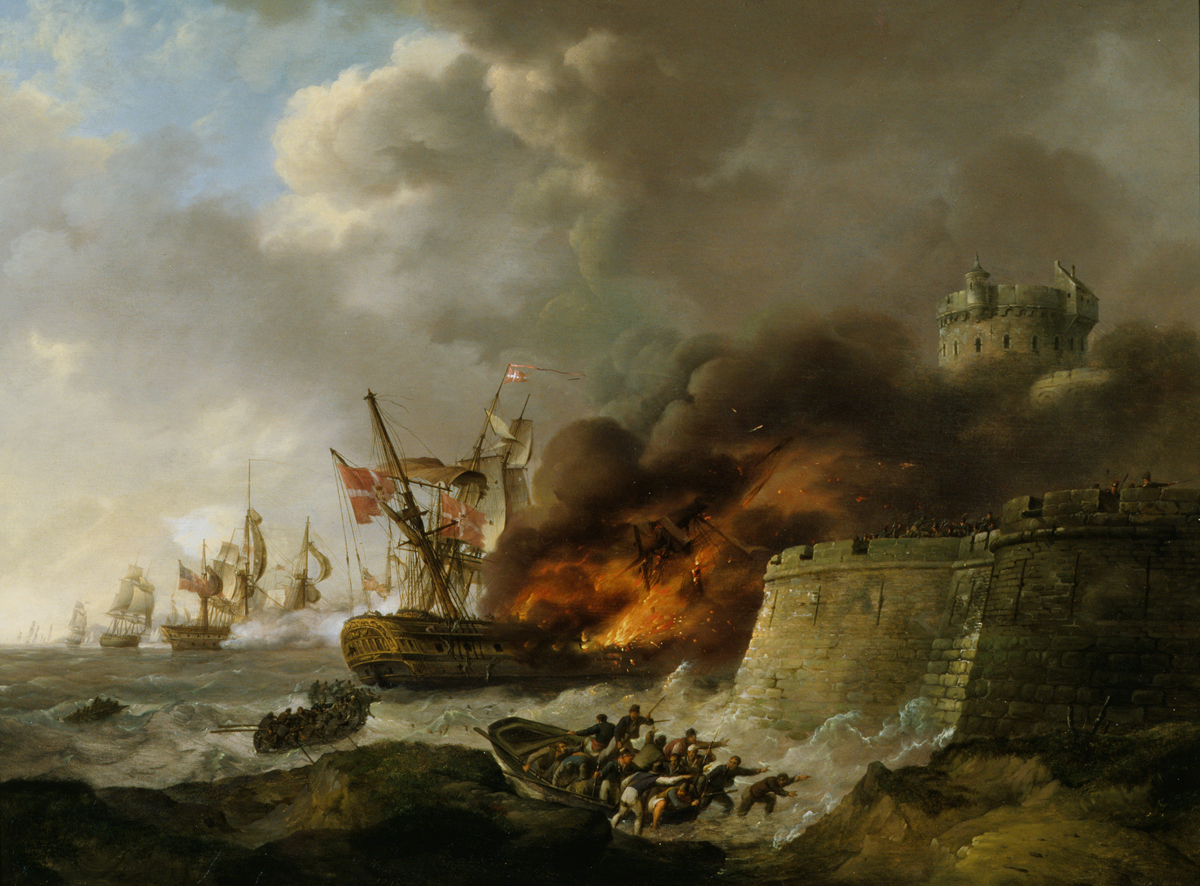
The Battle of Copenhagen (1813)

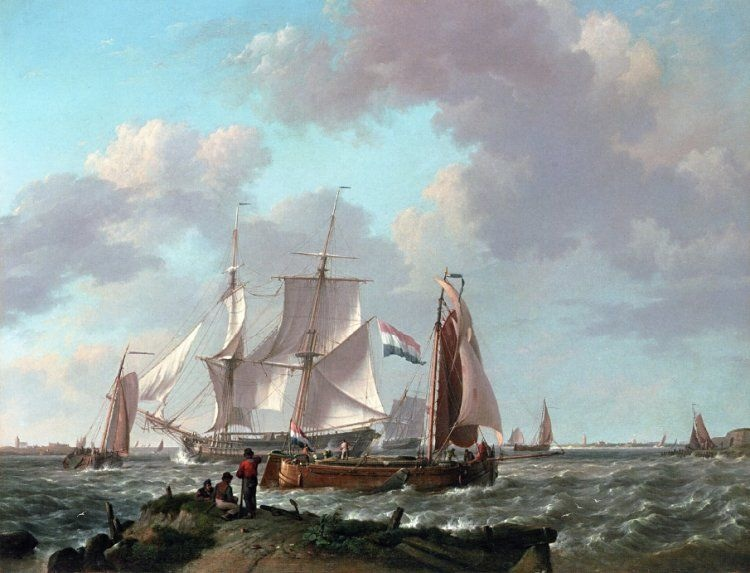
Ships in a Squall (1831)

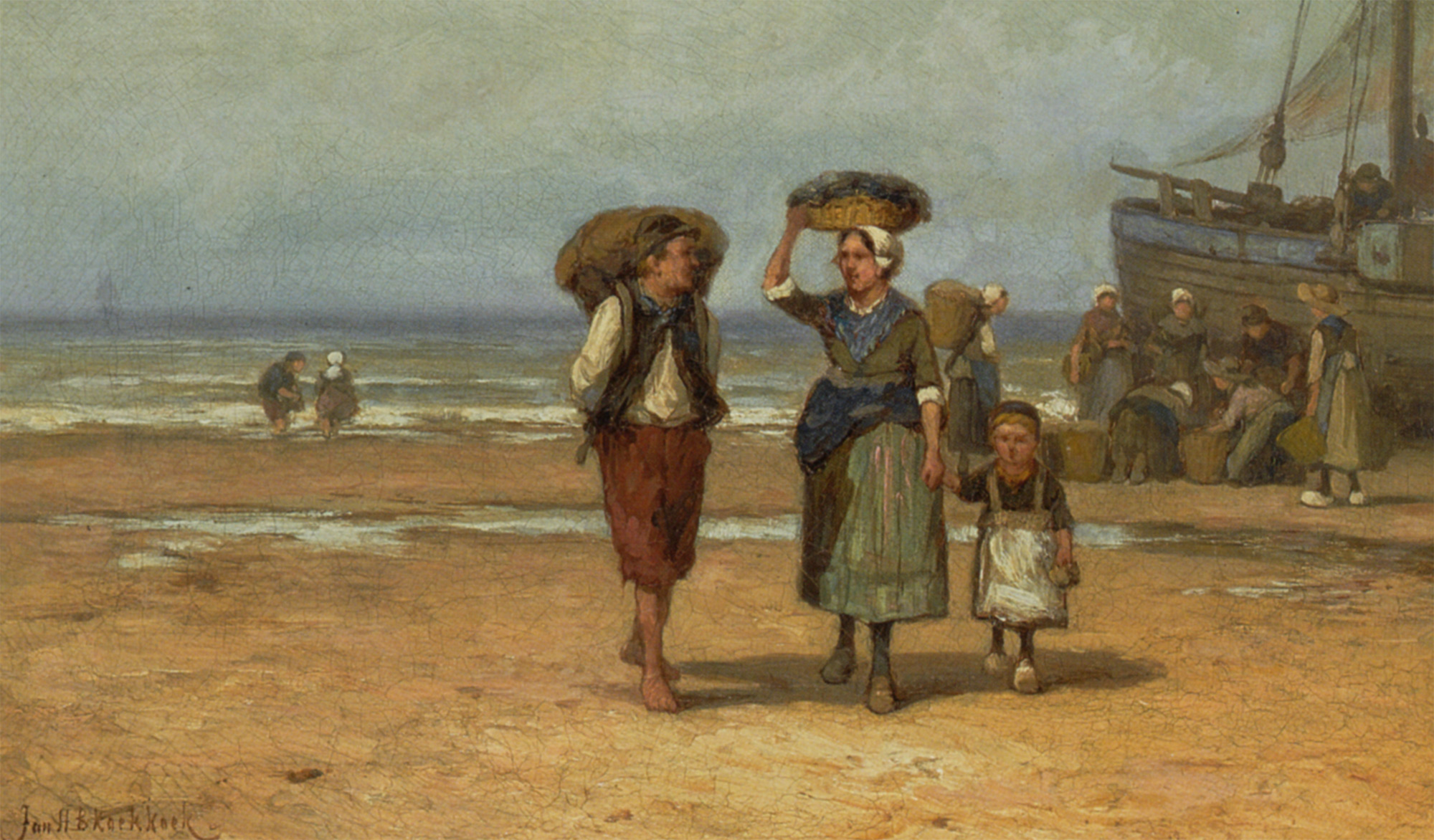
Unloading the Catch

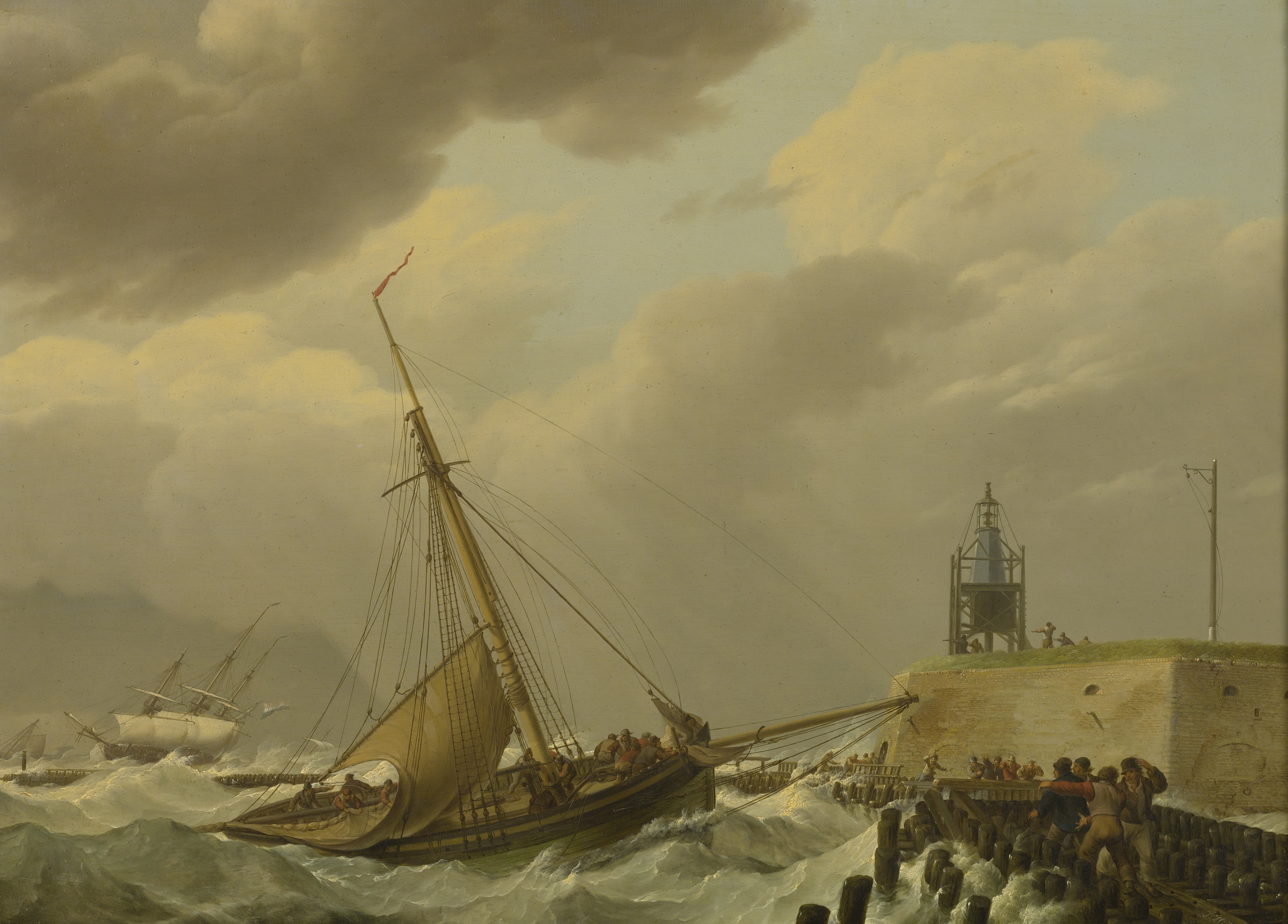
Ships in Stormy Seas (1821)

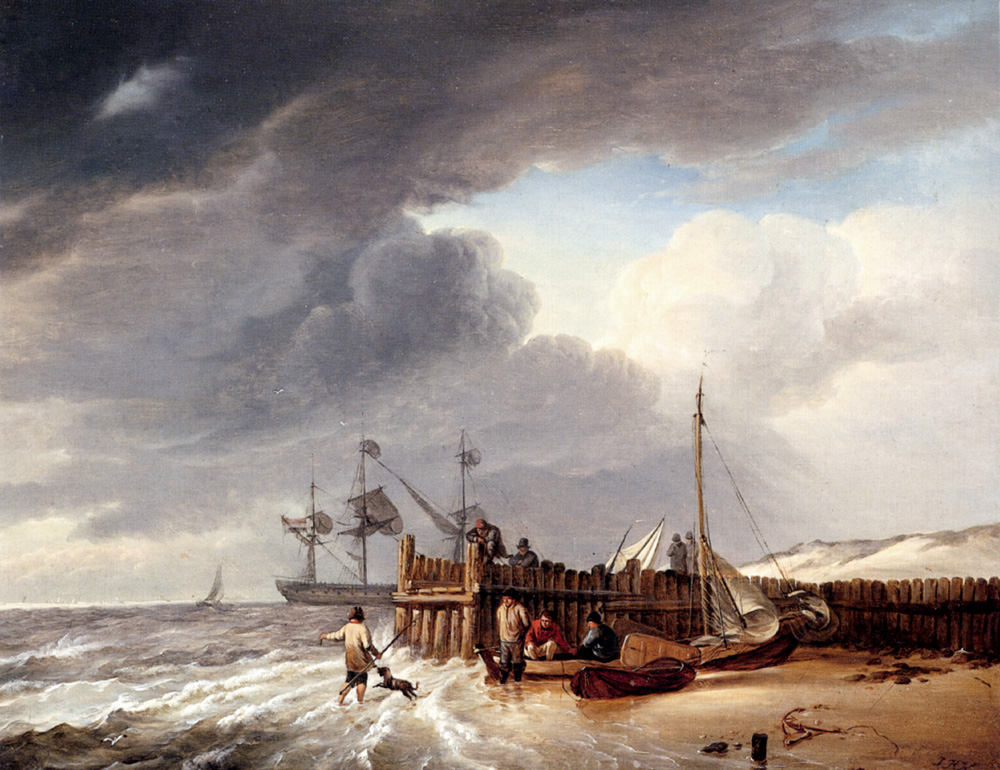
On the Beach (1823)
