= Koekkoek family =

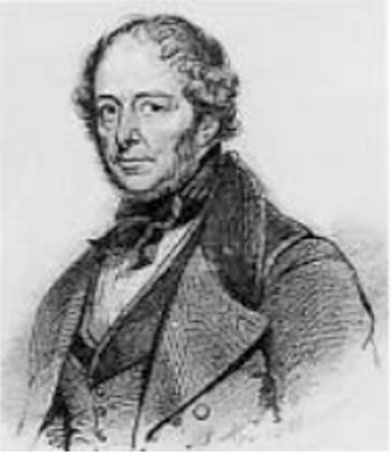
Johannes Hermanus Koekkoek, progenitor of the family.

The Koekkoek family is a Dutch family which produced a large number of painters, primarily during the 19th century. With a total of eighteen painters across five generations bearing the name, the Koekkoek family is considered to be one of the largest families of painters in the world. The second-generation Barend Cornelis Koekkoek was the most influential of the family: in general, he was one of the "main exponents of landscape art" in the 19th century, and in particular, his influence through the school he founded in the city of Kleve led to the recognition of Kleve Romanticism as a specific and oft-imitated style. Since 1960, his former Kleve residence now houses the B.C. Koekkoek-Haus museum, which is dedicated to works of the family. Artists of the Koekkoek name and others in the extended family were mostly oil painters of landscapes and marine art, but included lithographers, sculpturists, and others as well.

== Family tree and members ==
Five generations of Koekkoek artists

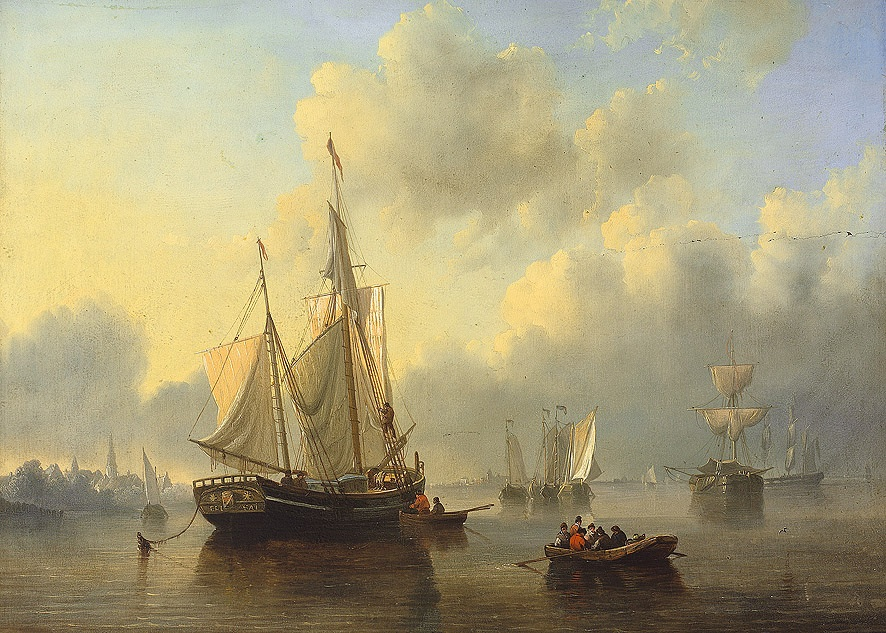
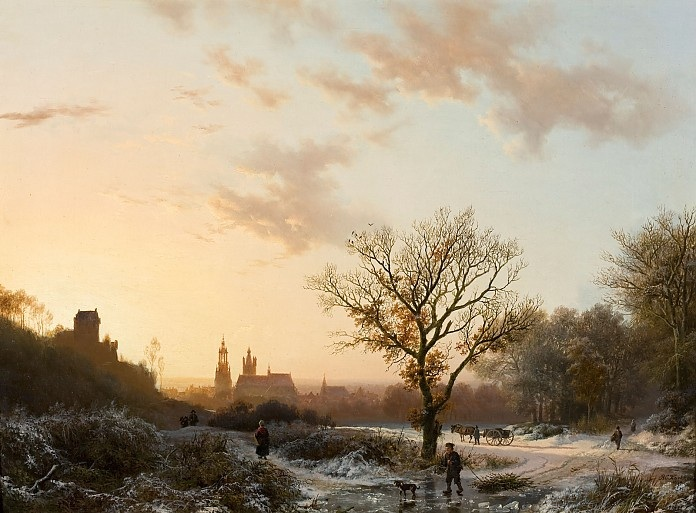
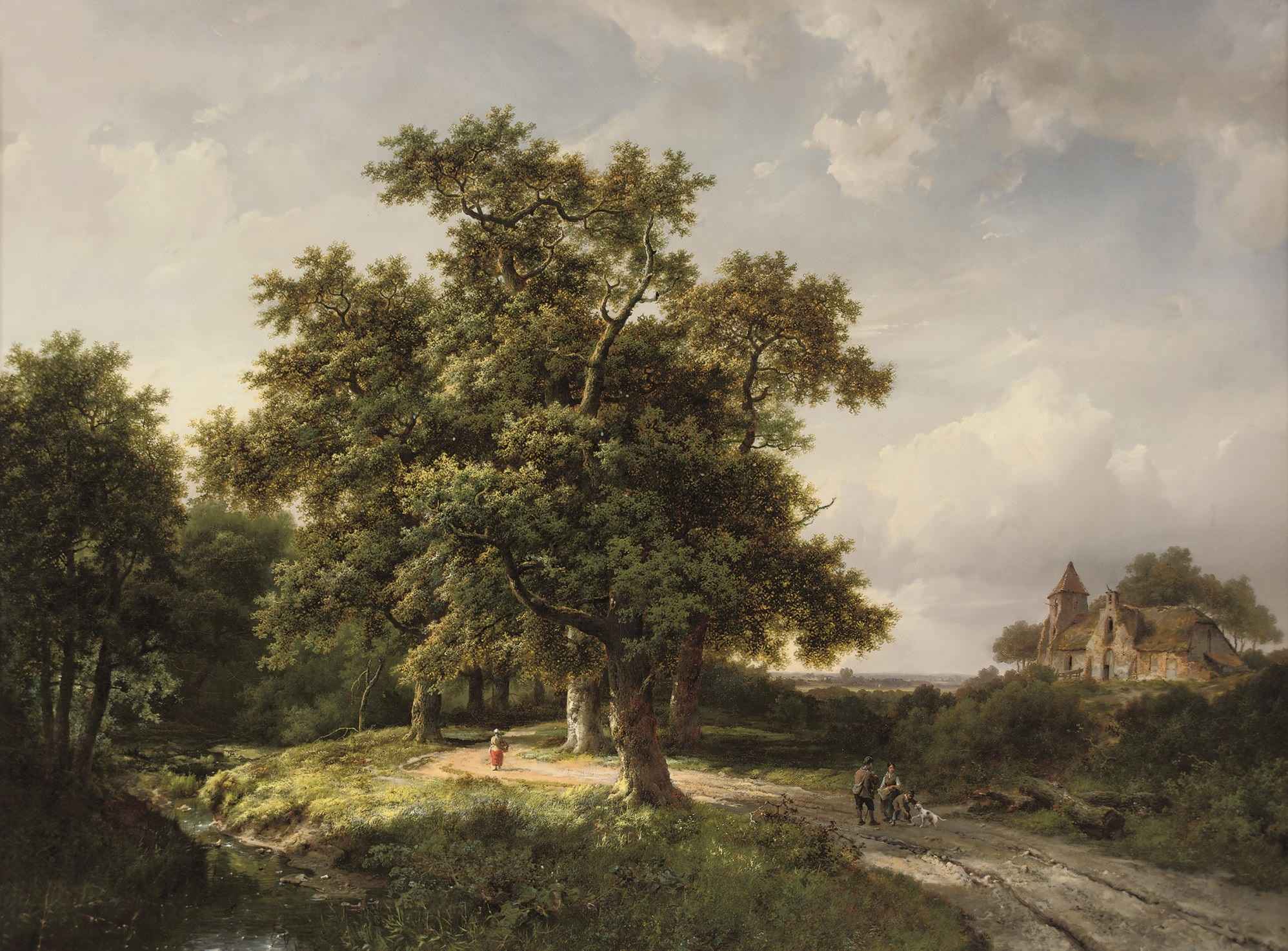
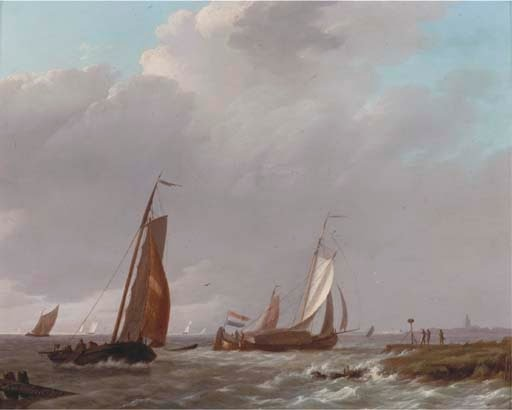
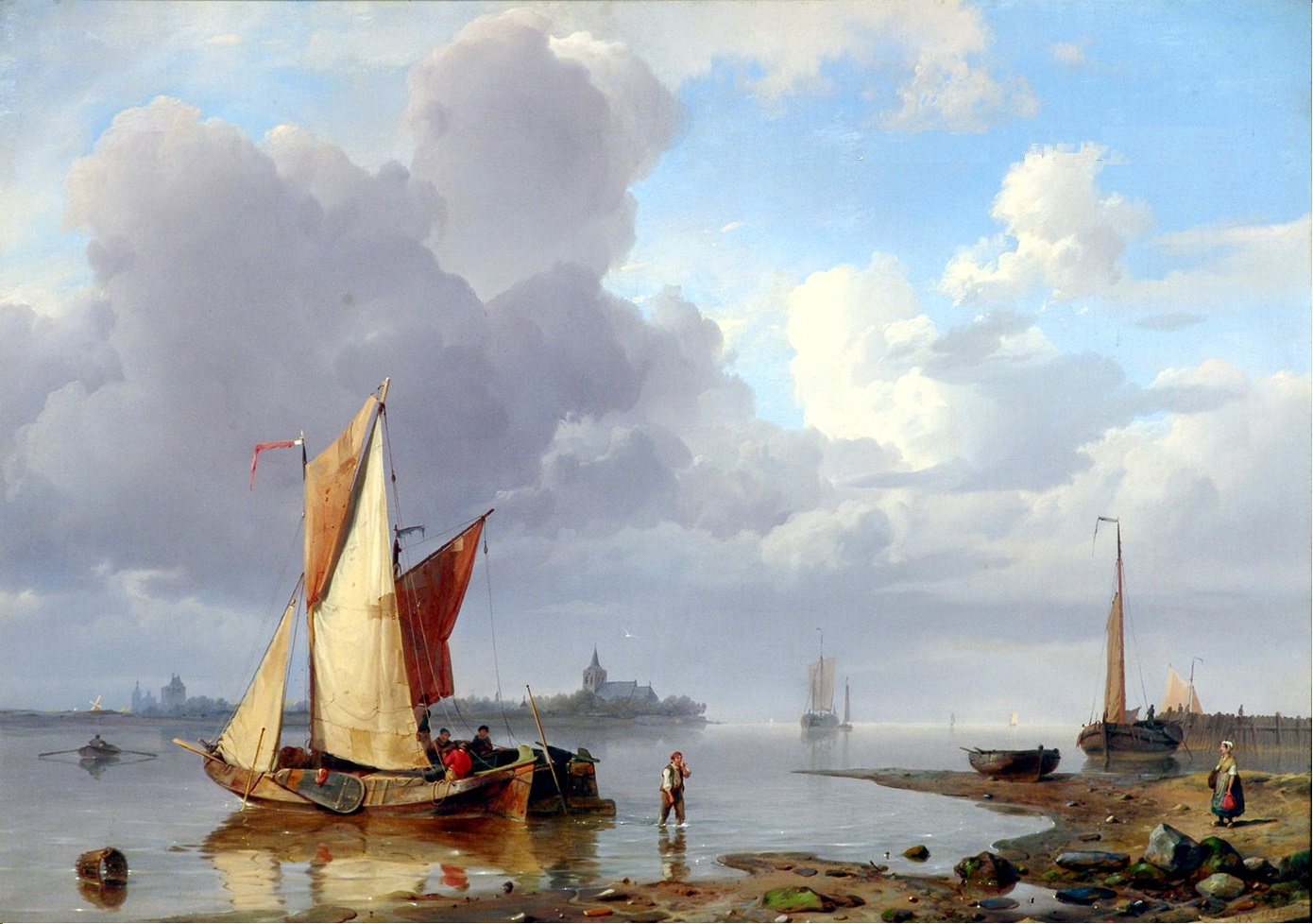
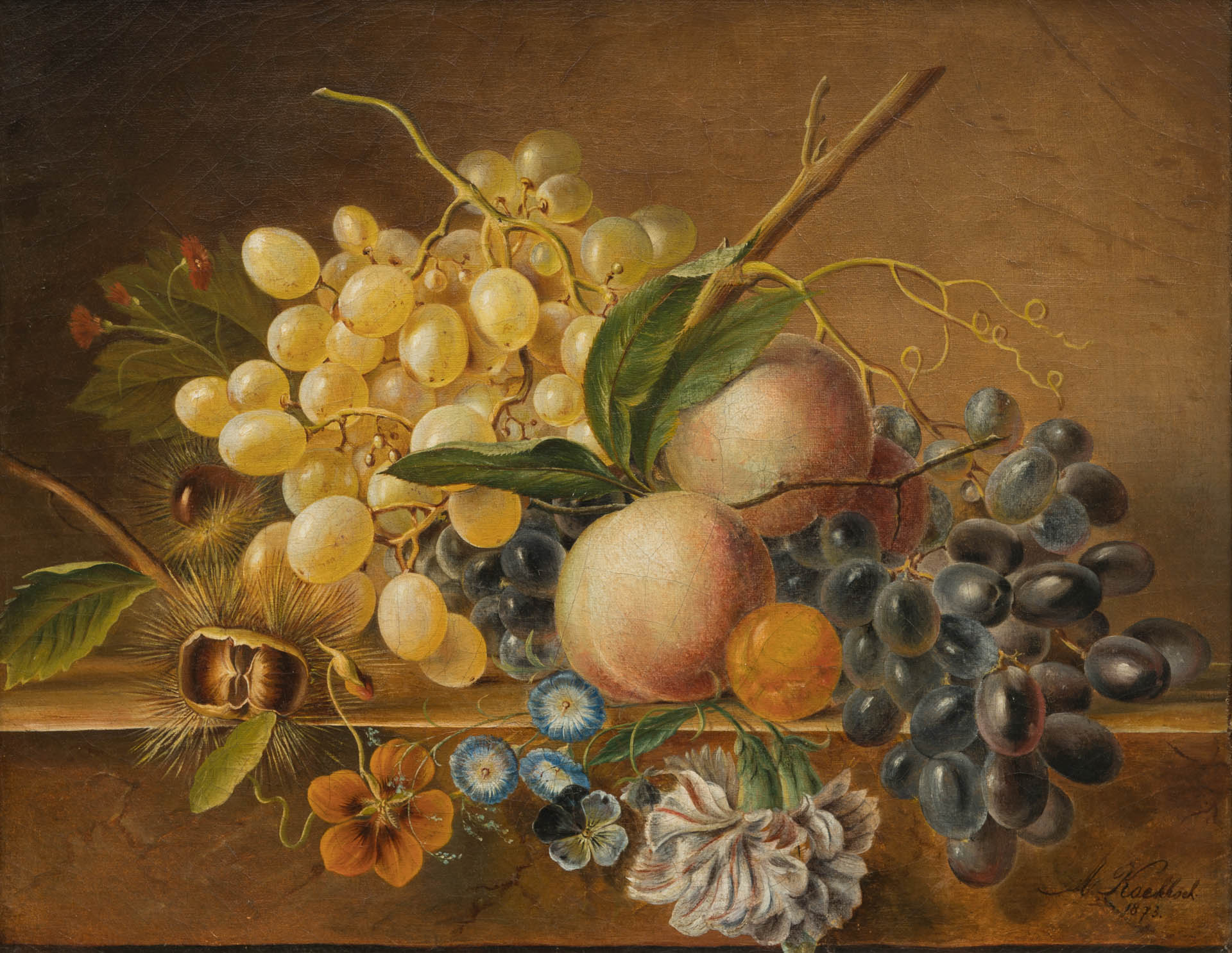
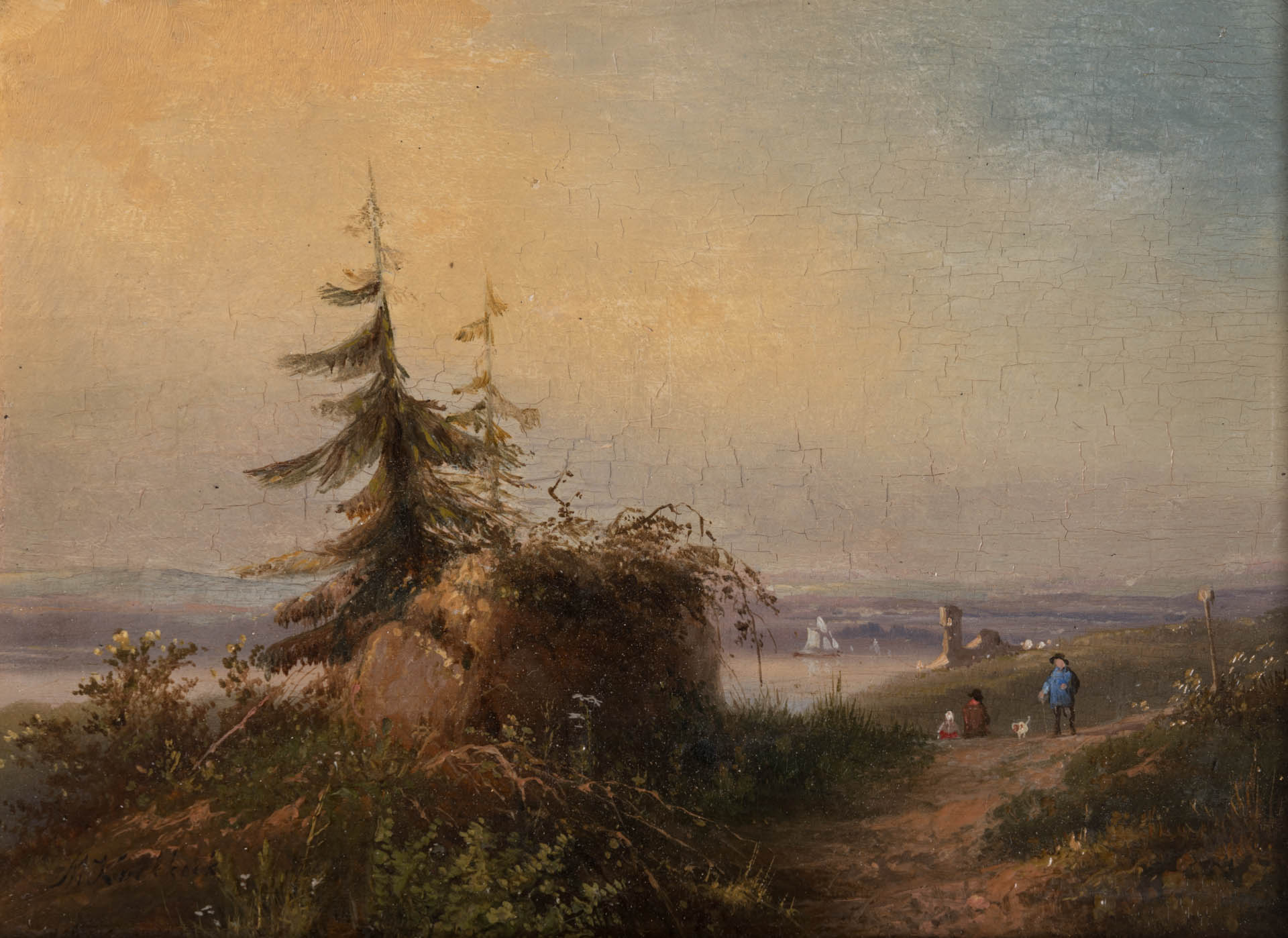
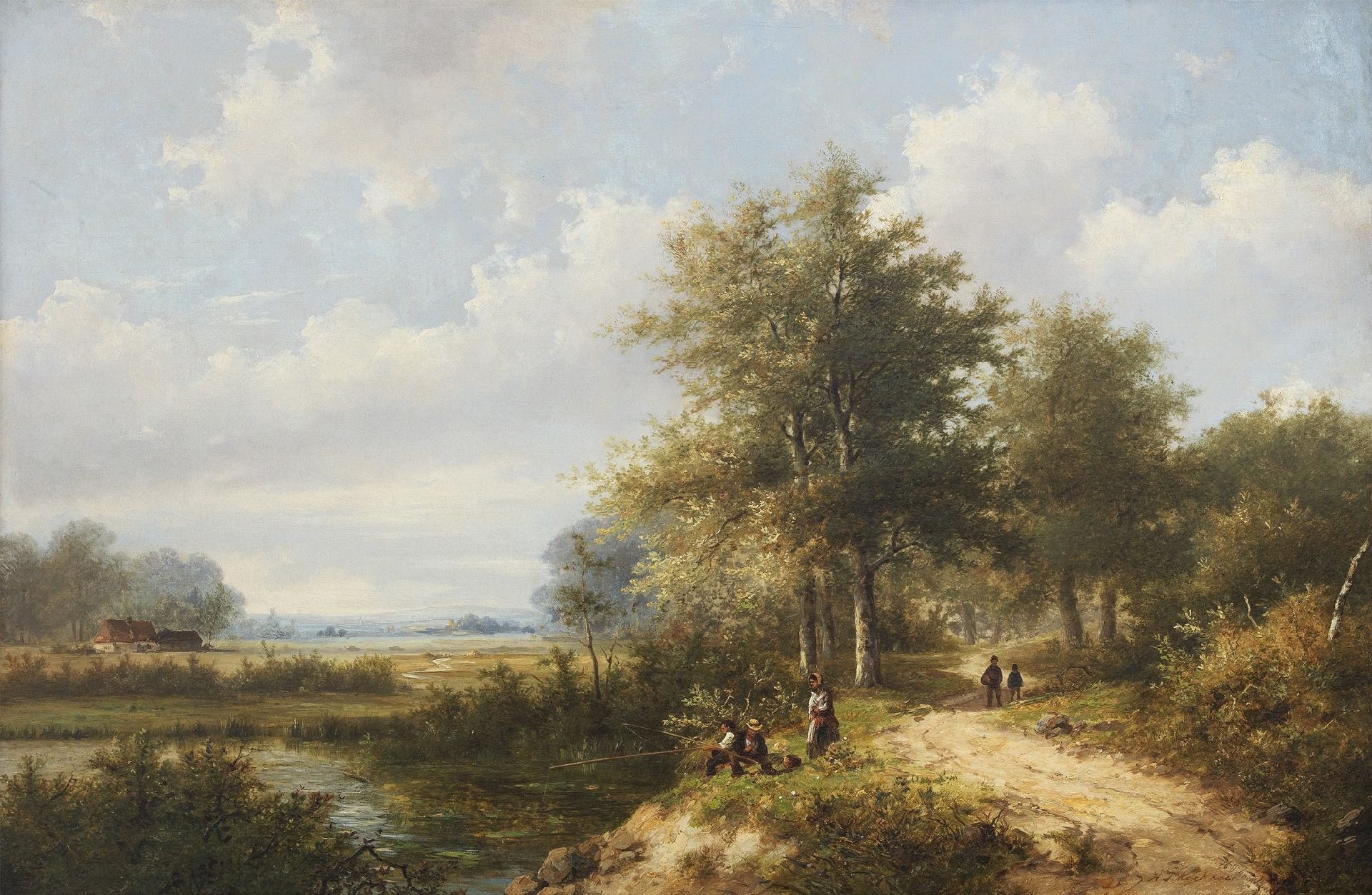
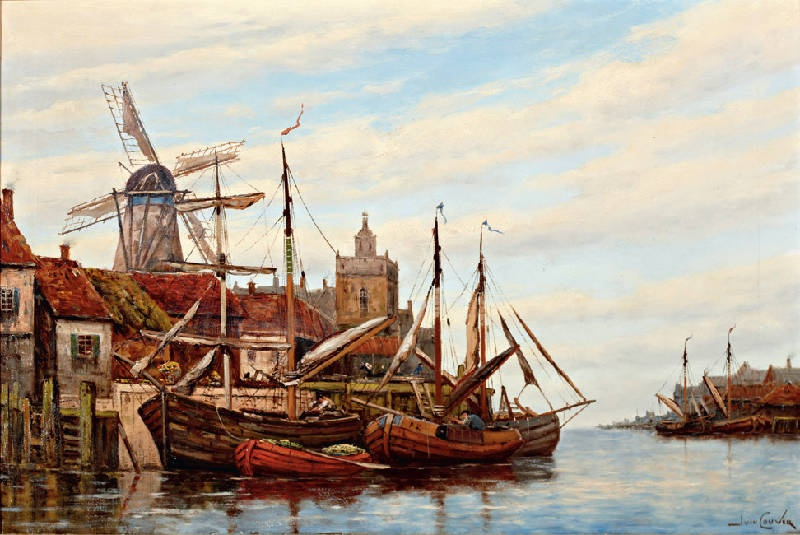
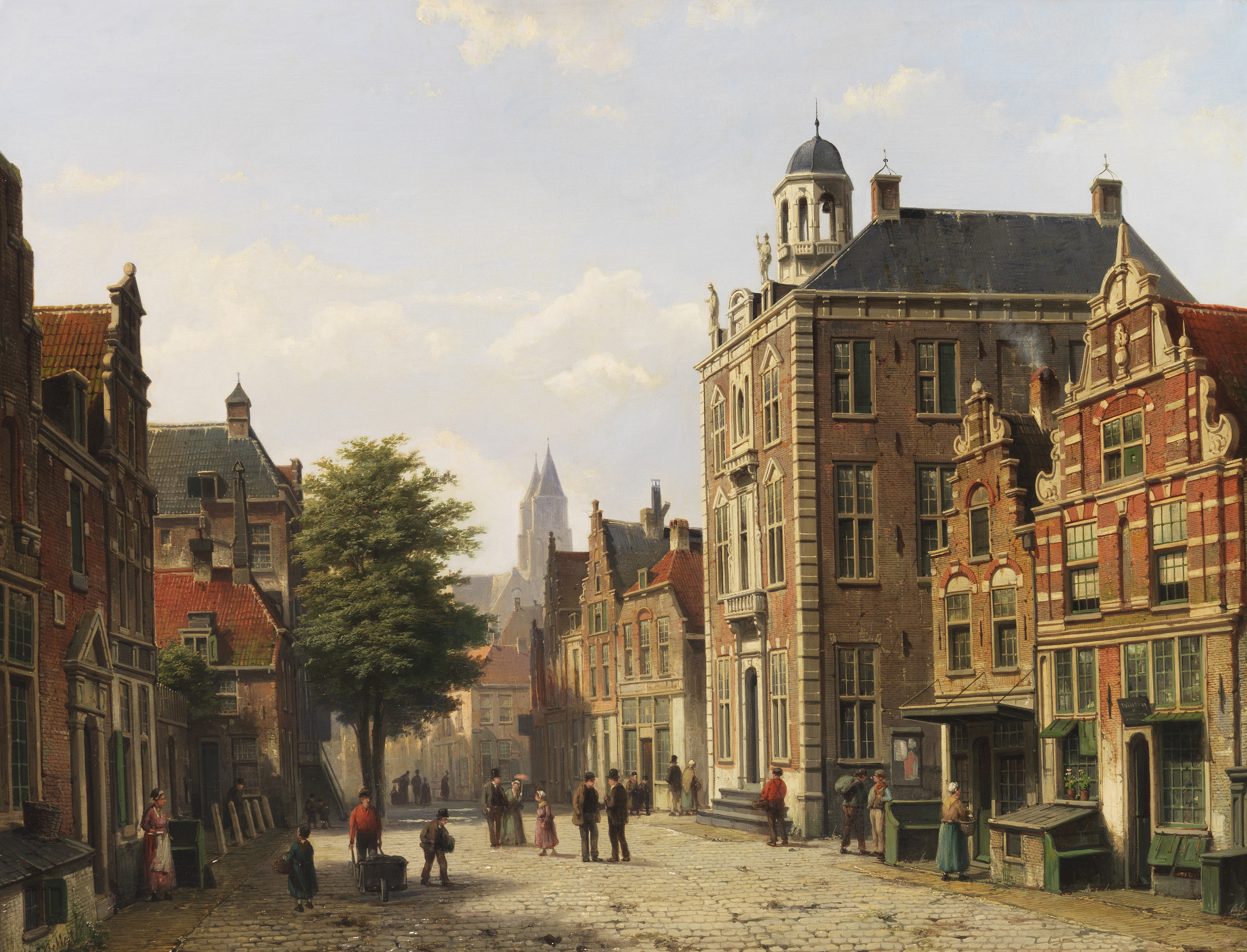
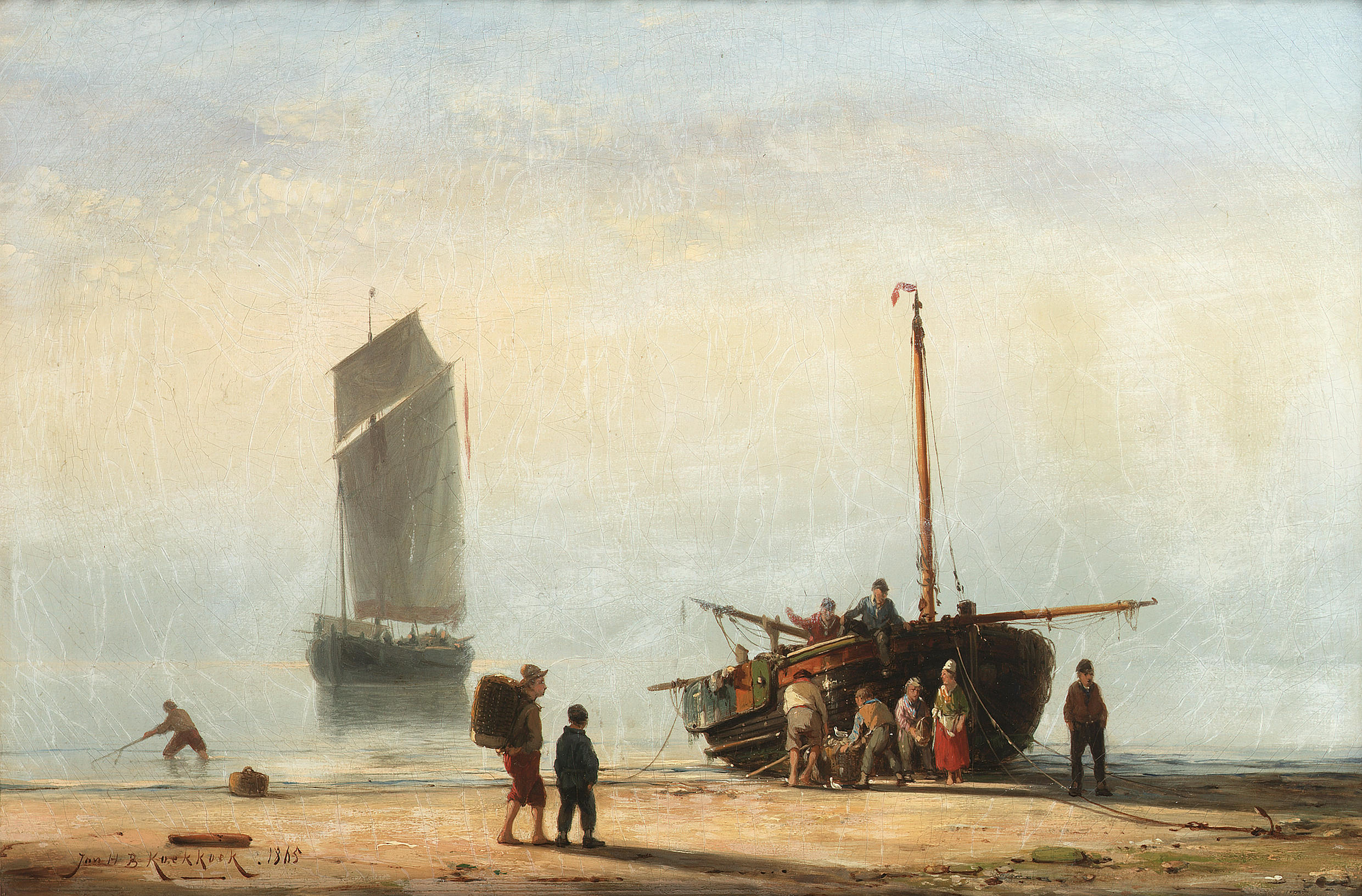
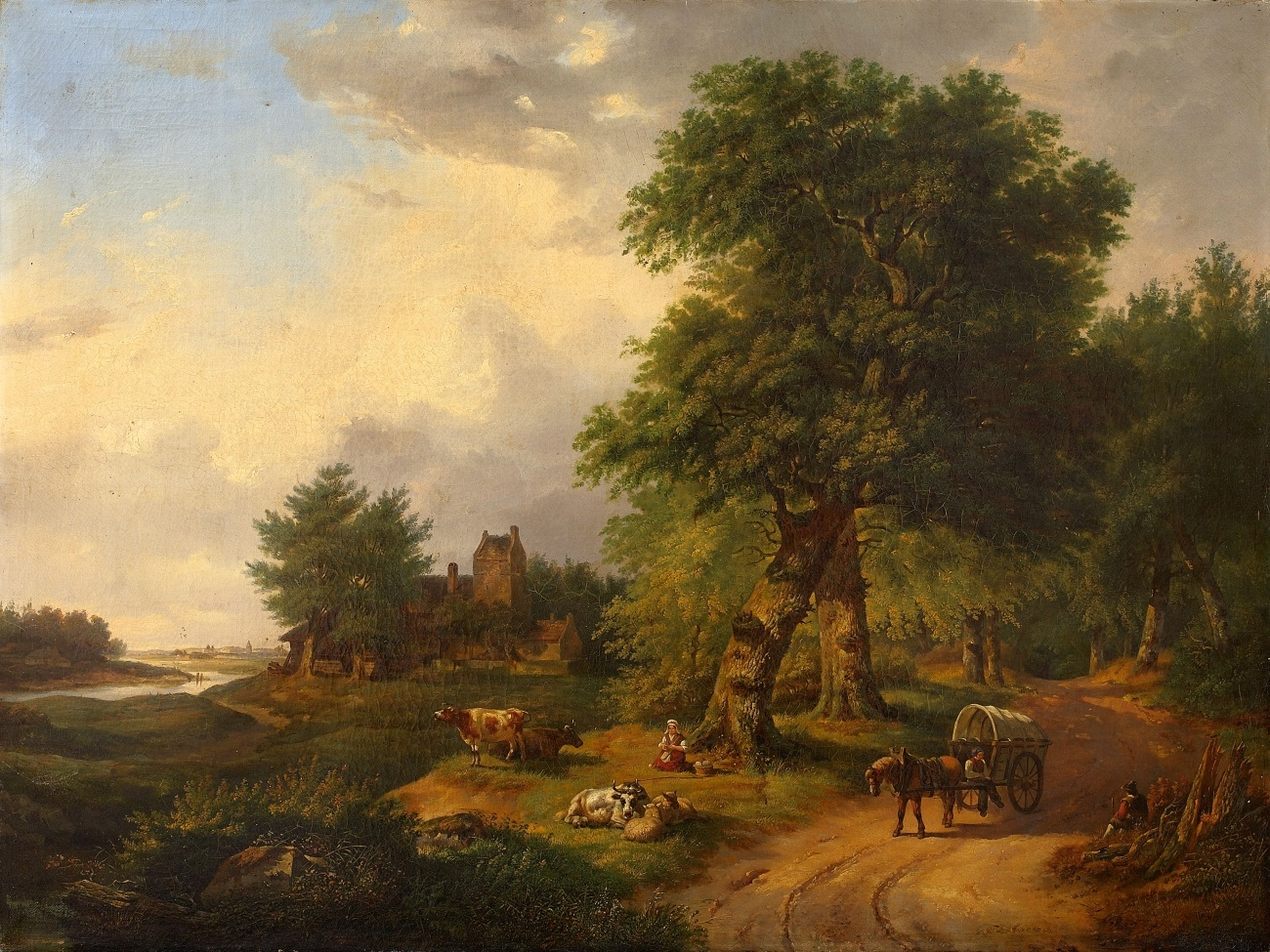
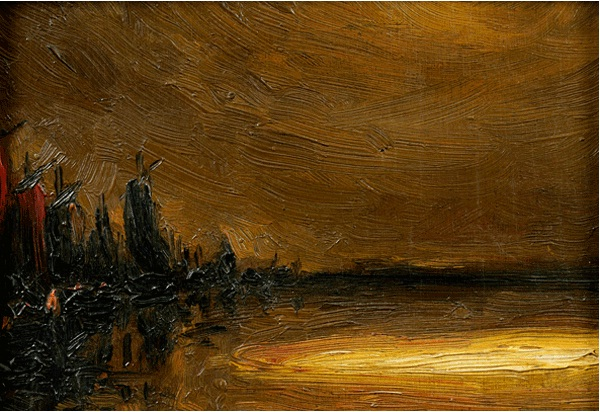
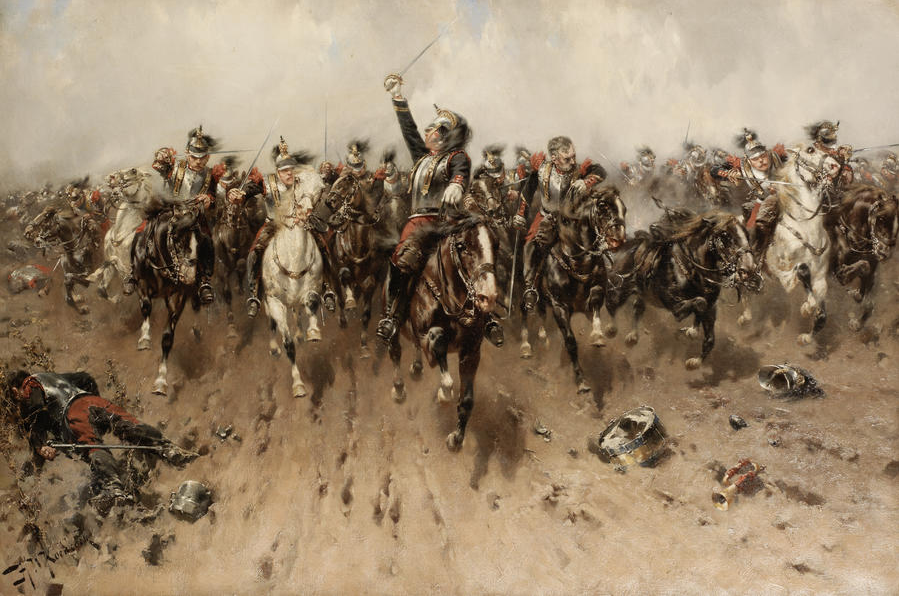
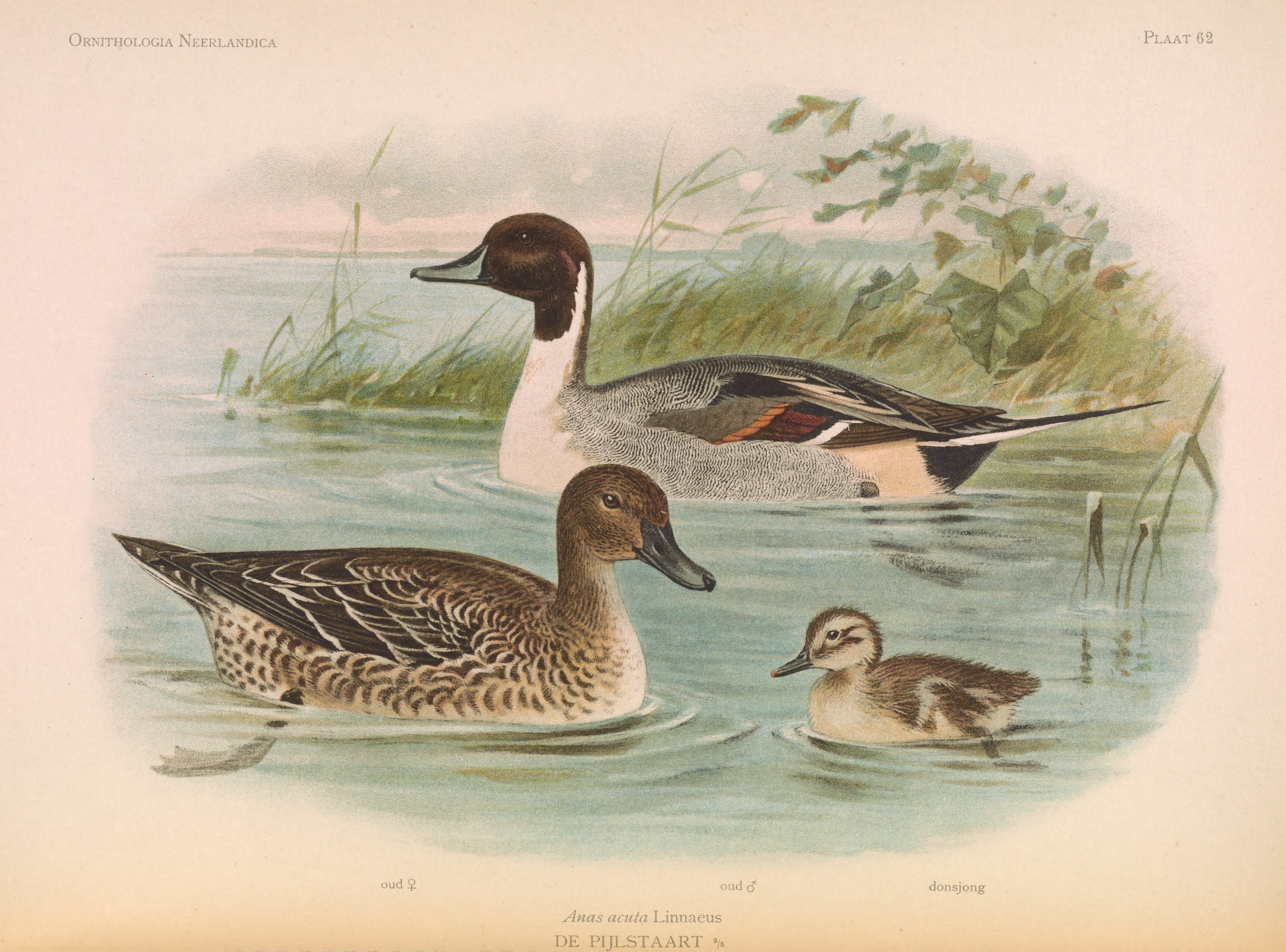
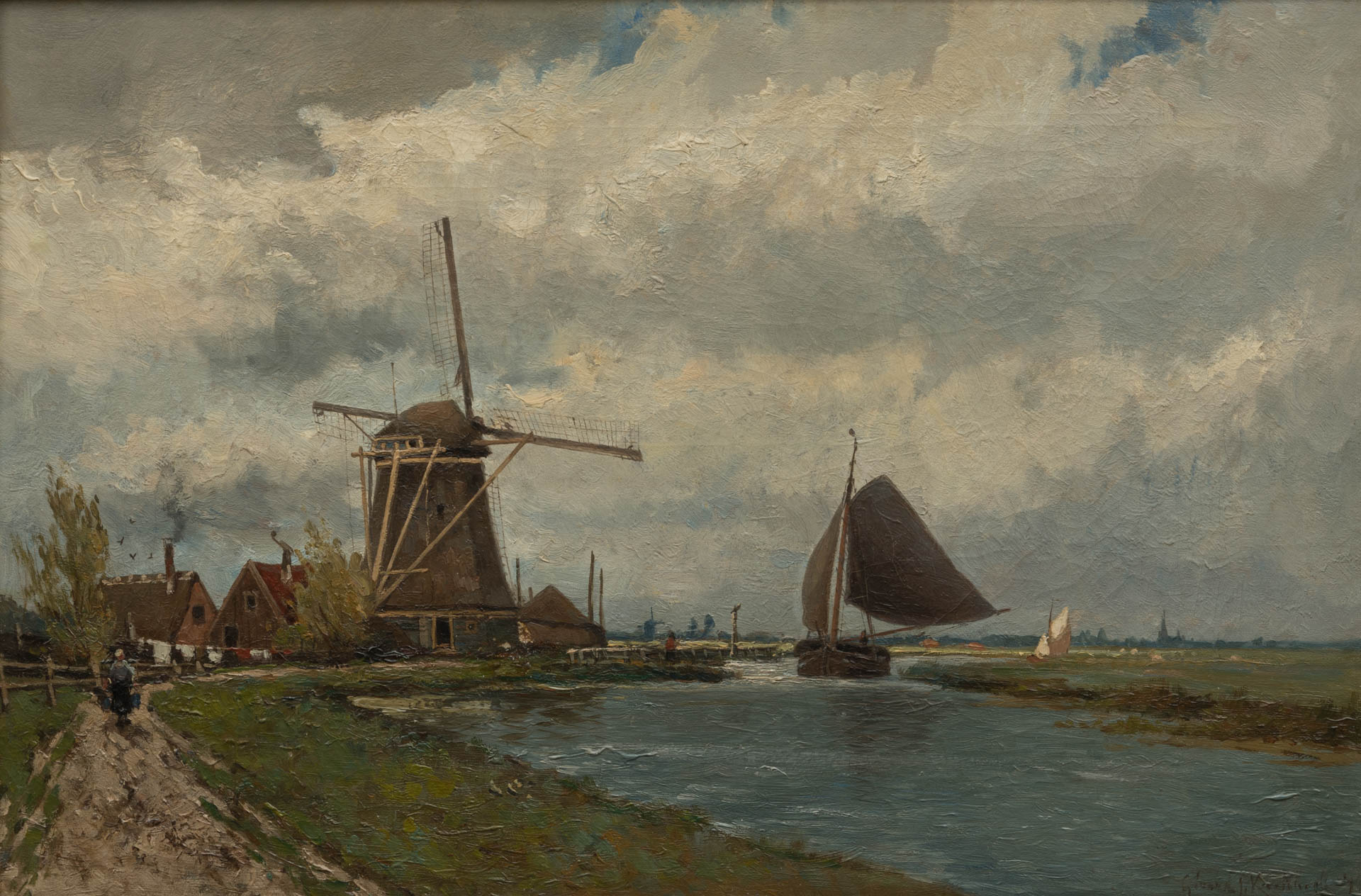
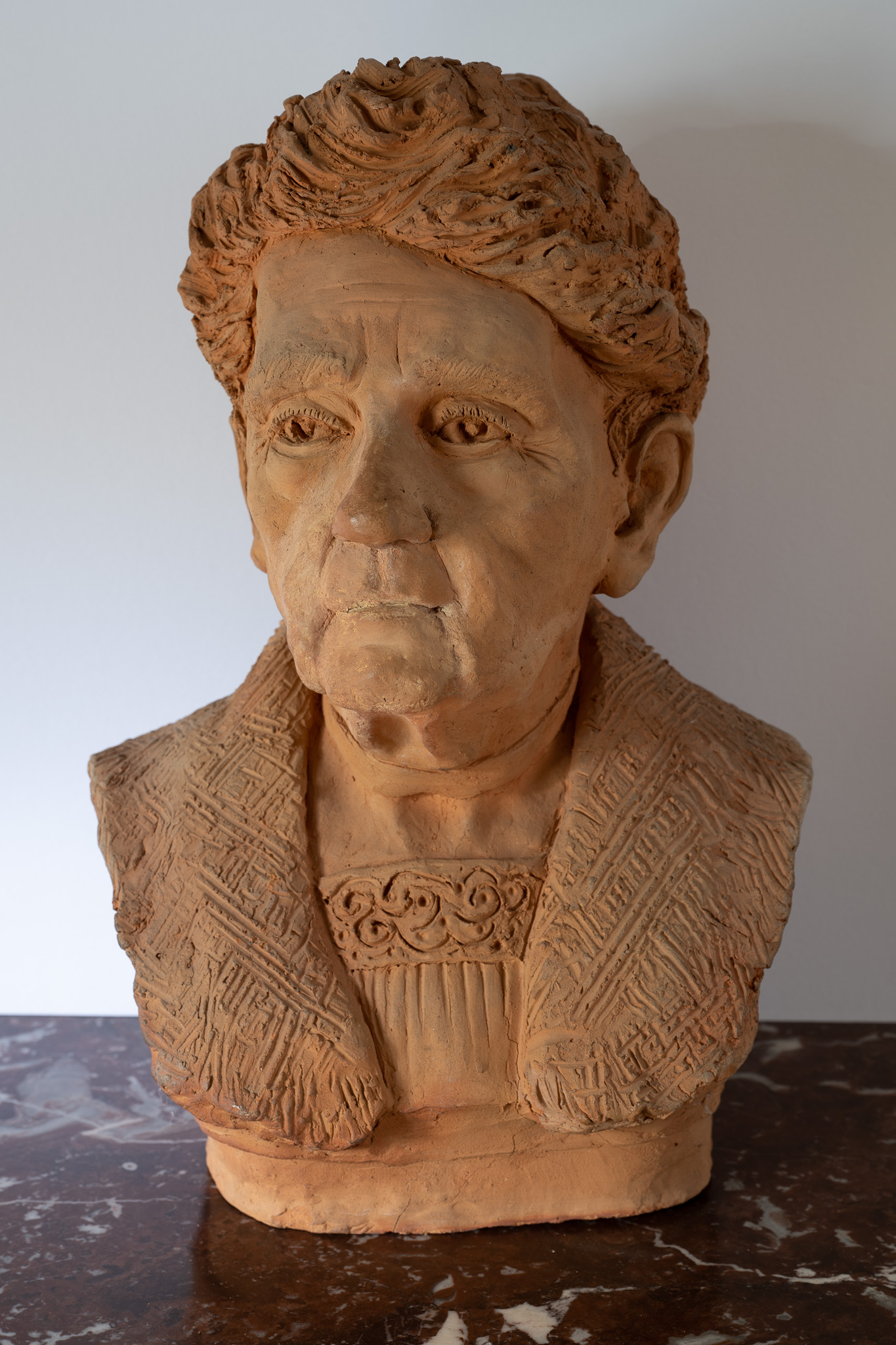
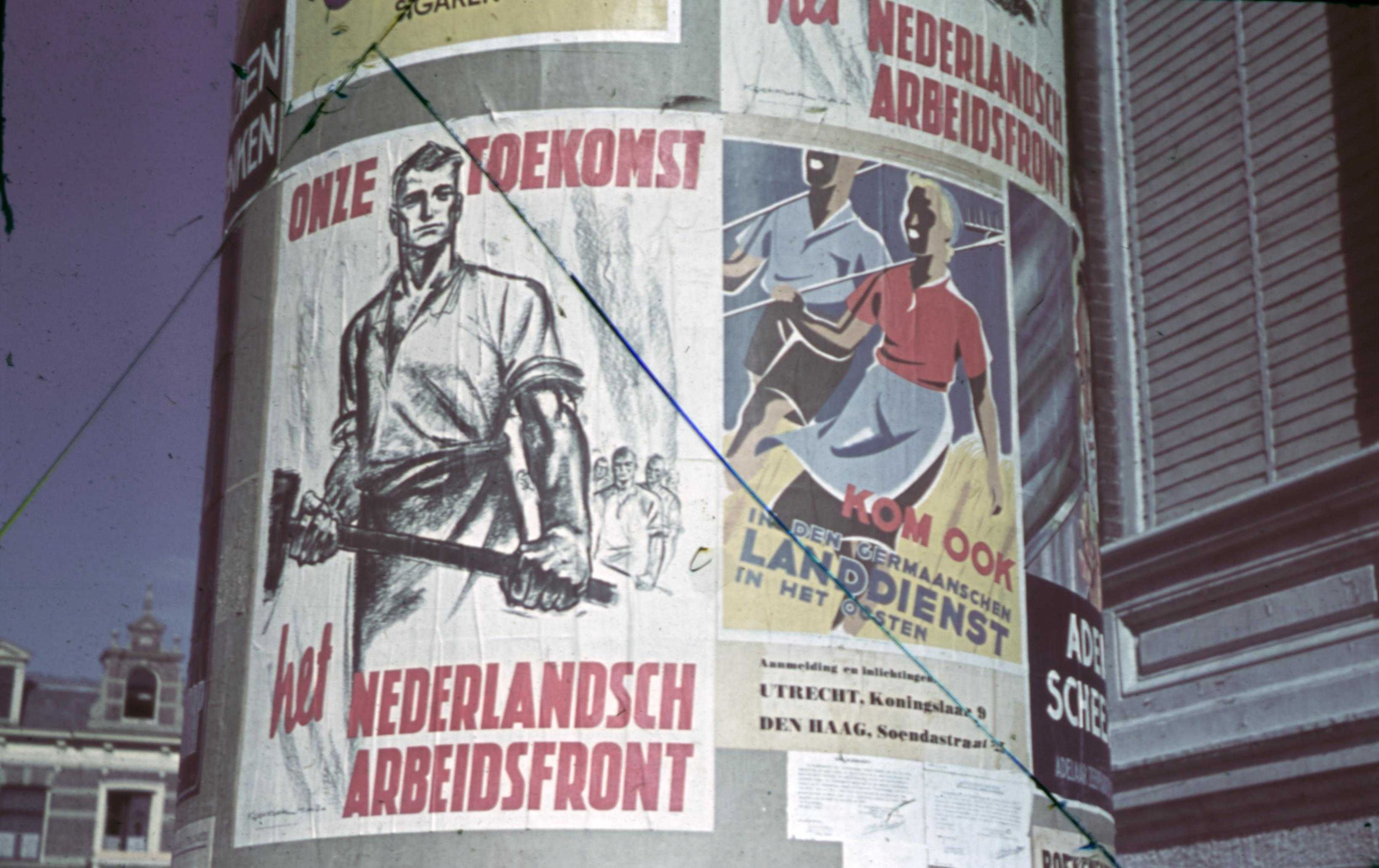
Johannes Hermanus; 1778-1851
Barend Cornelis; 1803-1862	Marinus Adriaan; 1807-1868	Johannes; 1811-1831	Hermanus Sr; 1815-1882
Adelaide Alexandrine 'Adèle'; 1838-1919	Maria Louise; 1840-1910	Hendrik Pieter; 1843-1927	Hermanus Jr; 1836-1909	Willem; 1839-1895	Johannes Hermanus Barend; 1840-1912	Barend Hendrik; 1849-1902
Stephen Robert; 1887-1934	Hermanus Willem; 1867-1929	Marinus Adrianus; 1873-1944	Gerardus Johannes; 1871-1956
Louise Hermina Carry May; 1898-1989	Cornelis 'Kees'; 1903-1982

=== First and second generation ===
The progenitor of the artists' family was the marine painter Johannes Hermanus Koekkoek, who was born in Veere in 1778 but mostly lived in Middelburg. In Veere he initially worked as an assistant house painter; in Middelburg, while enrolling at the academy in Middelburg, he found work at a wallpaper workshop before becoming a fine art painter. He would later return to the academy as teacher. He died aged 72 in 1851.

He married Anna Koolwijk in 1803; they had seven children, four of whom became painters. The eldest, Barend Cornelis, was born in 1803, followed by Marinus Adriaan (1807), Johannes (1811), and Hermanus (1815).

From this second generation, Barend Cornelis Koekkoek would become the most influential painter of the Koekkoek family. He and his siblings learned to paint from his father. In 1817, he enrolled first at the Drawing Academy of Middelburg, where he studied under Abraham Krayestein, and later, in 1822, at the newly founded Koninklijke Academie van Beeldende Kunsten in Amsterdam. After he moved to the city of Kleve, Germany, his style of landscape painting came to be known as Kleve Romanticism. His critical and financial success allowed him to open his own academy in the city, where he taught this style to painters including Johann Bernhard Klombeck, Fredrik Marinus Kruseman, Alexander Joseph Daiwaille, and Jacob Abels. He married Elise Thérèse Daiwalle, daughter of his friend and teacher Jean Augustin Daiwaille and also a painter herself, in 1833. He died aged 58 in 1862.

Marinus Adriaan Koekkoek, Johannes Hermanus' second son, was also first taught by his father, but worked as a decorative painter at a factory before he spent two years at Barend Cornelis' academy in Kleve and became a professional fine art painter. He died at 60 years, in 1868; a son from his second marriage also become a painter.

Johannes Koekkoek and his twin sister Anna were named after their parents; Johannes painted primarily seascapes. He died at age 19, in 1831. Twin Anna became a tailor, not a painter.

Hermanus Koekkoek, the youngest of this generation, painted marine and river subjects in his father's style before developing a more innovative style, with which he came to be counted among the foremost marine painters among Dutch romanticists in his own right. He is often referred to as simply "The Elder", because of his son of the same name. He joined the academy in Amsterdam in 1840, and widely exhibited his works throughout the country. He received a golden medal from Arti et Amicitiae in 1875. His son opened an art dealership in London, which in part accounts for why his work was more sought after in England than the Netherlands. He married Johanna Maria de Soet in 1837; their four sons would all become artists. He died aged 67 in 1882.

=== Third generation ===
Except for Johannes, all second-generation Koekkoek artists had children who became artists themselves. This third generation of Koekkoek artists includes the following seven painters.

Taught by their father, two daughters of Barend Cornelis and Elise Thérèse painted, although they did not rely on it for their income. Little work is known from Adèle Koekkoek (1838); she mostly painted still lives. Maria Louise Koekkoek (1840) created silhouette art, but primarily worked in the landscape tradition, studying also at the Kunstakademie Düsseldorf. Adèle died in 1919; Maria Louise in 1910.

Hendrik Pieter Koekkoek was born Pieter Hendrik in 1843 to Marinus Adriaan and his wife Adriana Hendrika van Walt. He signed his work 'H.P.' rather than 'P.H.', and is thus primarily known as Hendrik Pieter. Taught first by his father, his later works were finer and more in the realistic, rather than romanticist, style. He lived, worked, and exhibited in various cities throughout the Netherlands and England; he died in Amsterdam, aged 84, in 1927.

Hermanus Koekkoek the Younger was the eldest of four artist brothers born to Hermanus Koekkoek and Johanna Maria de Soet. Born in 1836, he received his first lessons from his father. His first recorded visit to London was in 1863, before he permanently settled there in 1869. Around 1880, he opened an art gallery, where the sale of primarily his own, his father's, and Barend Cornelis' works contributed to their popularity in England. His paintings were mostly romanticist seascapes. After he opened his gallery, he sometimes signed his works with the pseudonym Jan van Couver. He married Cornelia Müller in 1836, in Amsterdam. He died in 1909, aged 75.

Willem Koekkoek was born in 1839, and was also educated by his father. He was trained as an architect, before painting professionally. He painted in the romanticist style inspired by both his family and Cornelis Springer. His paintings were popular in both the Netherlands and England. Some works were created in collaboration with his father, signed by both of them. He married his cousin, Johanna Hermina Koekkoek, a daughter of Marinus Adriaan, in 1865. From their at least six children, two would go on to be painters. He died in 1895, aged 56.

Johannes Hermanus Barend Koekkoek, mostly known as Jan H. B., was born in 1840 as the third of the four sons. It is said he was the most versatile painter among the four, and, perhaps after Hendrik Pieter's later period, also the first to clearly deviate from the romanticist style: under influence of both the Laren School of the Gooi region where he lived, and the Hague School, he would adopt a less idealised, more realistic and somber style. He mostly painted seascapes. His first exhibition was in 1859. He was a member of artist association Arti et Amicitiae, taught, and worked as an art dealer. He married Antje Muller in 1865, who died ten years later, and then married Johanna Dorethea Ham in 1877. He died in 1912, aged 71.

Barend Hendrik Koekkoek, the youngest artist of the third generation, was born in 1849. After being taught by his father and uncle Marinus Adriaan, he visited and painted numerous places in the Netherlands and abroad, including Brussels, London, as well as other areas in England. In 1879, he opened an art dealership in Amsterdam. He signed his works H. B. Koekkoek; he is therefore sometimes known as Hendrik Barend Koekkoek. He married Carolina Allardina Cornelia Pierson in 1878, but no known future artists were born from the marriage. He died in 1902, in the Horton Asylum in Epsom.

=== Fourth generation ===
Stephen Robert Koekkoek was born in London, 1887, to Hermanus the Younger, who had his art dealership there. Assisting his father, he learned to paint without formal training, but initially worked as a labourer. As the first of the Koekkoek artists to leave the European continent, he appears to have left England for the Americas in 1908 to move to Peru, where he taught English; he later settled in Argentina. It was around this time that he started painting professionally, and from 1915 onward, he exhibited his work in several South American countries. In 1928, he was arrested and admitted to a hospital with diagnoses of schizophrenia and delusions. He continued to paint and exhibit during an increasingly precarious life, paying off debts with his paintings, which were at times painted on pieces of furniture he took from hotels. A productive painter, in Argentina he is considered a "genuinely national artist", and has been called "the most passionate, versatile and adventurous painter of Argentine art". He died in 1934, aged 47, of a drug overdose. He had one son from a brief marriage to Nella Azzoni.

Hermanus Willem Koekkoek was the eldest of two artists born to Willem and Johanna Hermina Koekkoek, Pieter Hendrik's sister. He was born in 1867 in Amsterdam. Working in a time where impressionism was popular, his style remained detailed and realistic, and focused on scenes of war, including of the Franco-Prussian War and the Boer Wars. He became known for these works, and for his work at the royal court. He also worked, for twenty years, as a freelance artist for The Illustrated London News. He never actually visited a battle field; his work was based on what he saw near barracks and military exercise grounds, on sketches from artists at battle fields, and on his own imagination. After photography became more prevalent, and when World War I negatively affected public opinion of war scenes, he moved back to the Netherlands where he painted primarily landscapes. His presumed focus on, and preference for, war scenes has been questioned more recently, as more varied work of his has been discovered. He married Louise Johannah de Laijen around 1890; their daughter would also become an artist. He died in 1929, aged 62.

Marinus Adrianus Koekkoek is often called Marinus Adrianus II or Marinus Adrianus the Younger to avoid confusion with his great uncle, Marinus Adriaan. He was born in 1873. For about twenty years, he worked at the natural history museum in Leiden as scientific draughtsman. He is known for his many works of scientific and educational nature, including schoolplaten (educational wall charts designed for classroom instruction) and biological illustrations in textbooks. He married Judith Gerritsen in 1901, and died in 1944, aged 71. One of their children also became an artist. After his death, Marinus Adrianus had been accused of creating fascist and antisemitic works to promote various organisations during World War II. Recent research however indicated that this was the work of his son, Cornelis, who often signed his works as being by "the son of M.A. Koekkoek".

Gerardus Johannes Koekkoek, in some records also spelled Gerrardus and sometimes known as Gerard, is the least-known artist of this generation. He was born in 1871 to Johannes Hermanus Barend and his first wife, Antje Muller, who died four years after this birth. After initial lessons from his father, he received further training in various techniques from Hendrik Willebrord Jansen and Pieter Dupont, and became a member of multiple art societies. While also painting landscapes and marine scapes, he mostly worked with etchings, lithographs, and woodcuts. He married Catharina Debora Johanna Terwiel in 1903, and died in 1956, aged 85.

=== Fifth generation ===
The fifth generation includes only two artists, neither of which gained much fame. This generation is not always included in retrospectives on the family.

Louise Hermina Carry May Koekkoekk, daughter of Hermanus Willem, was born in 1898. She worked in painting, sculpture, and applied arts; some of her works are in the B.C. Koekkoek-Haus museum's collection. She died at the age of 90, in 1989.

Cornelis Koekkoek, nicknamed Kees, was the son of Marinus Adrianus and was born in 1903. Cornelis enrolled at the Royal Academy of Art, The Hague, and later at the Prussian Academy of Arts in Berlin, Germany. Cornelis is mostly known for the fascist and antisemitic propaganda posters he produced for the National Socialist Movement in the Netherlands. Based on political criminal investigation records, art historian Maartje Brattinga concluded that this work was done out of "opportunism" rather than political conviction, with historian Jacques Dane summarising that it was done "during the war to make money, and not at all out of ideological convictions", adding that "he had two families to support". He married, and divorced, twice. Following the war, he was prohibited from practicing art for some time and sentenced to a fine, loss of civil rights for ten years, and placed under supervision for three; his later work is more expressionistic and abstract. He died at the age of 78 in 1982.

Two grandchildren of Maria Louise Koekkoek, Vera Sackmann-Issleiber (1926–2002) and Barend Issleiber (1943–1987) were also artists, but did not carry the name Koekkoek.

== Gallery ==
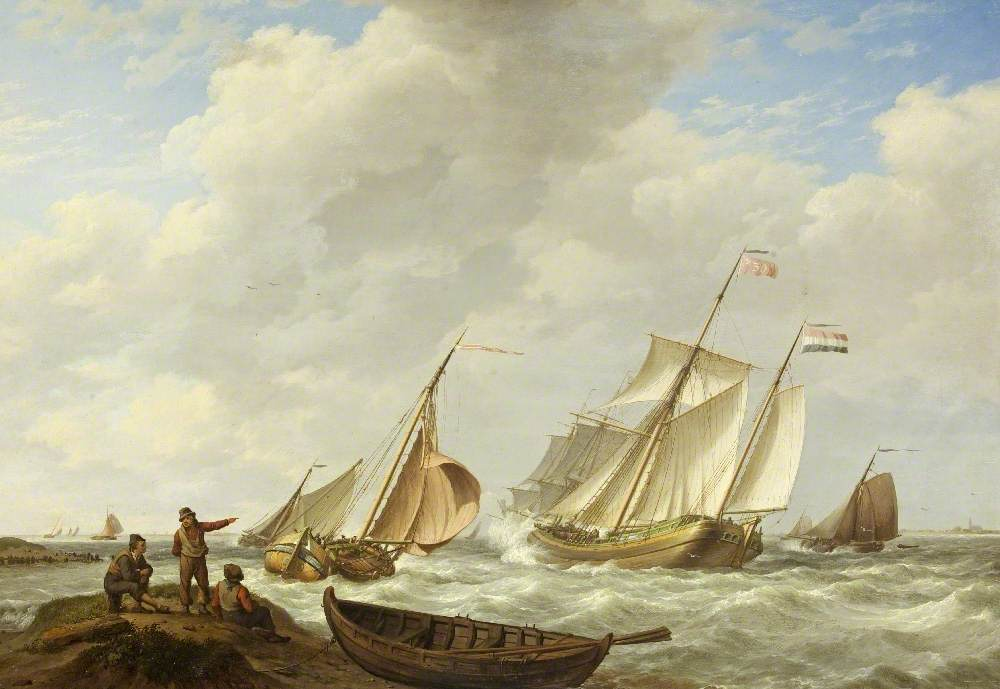
Johannes Hermanus Koekkoek

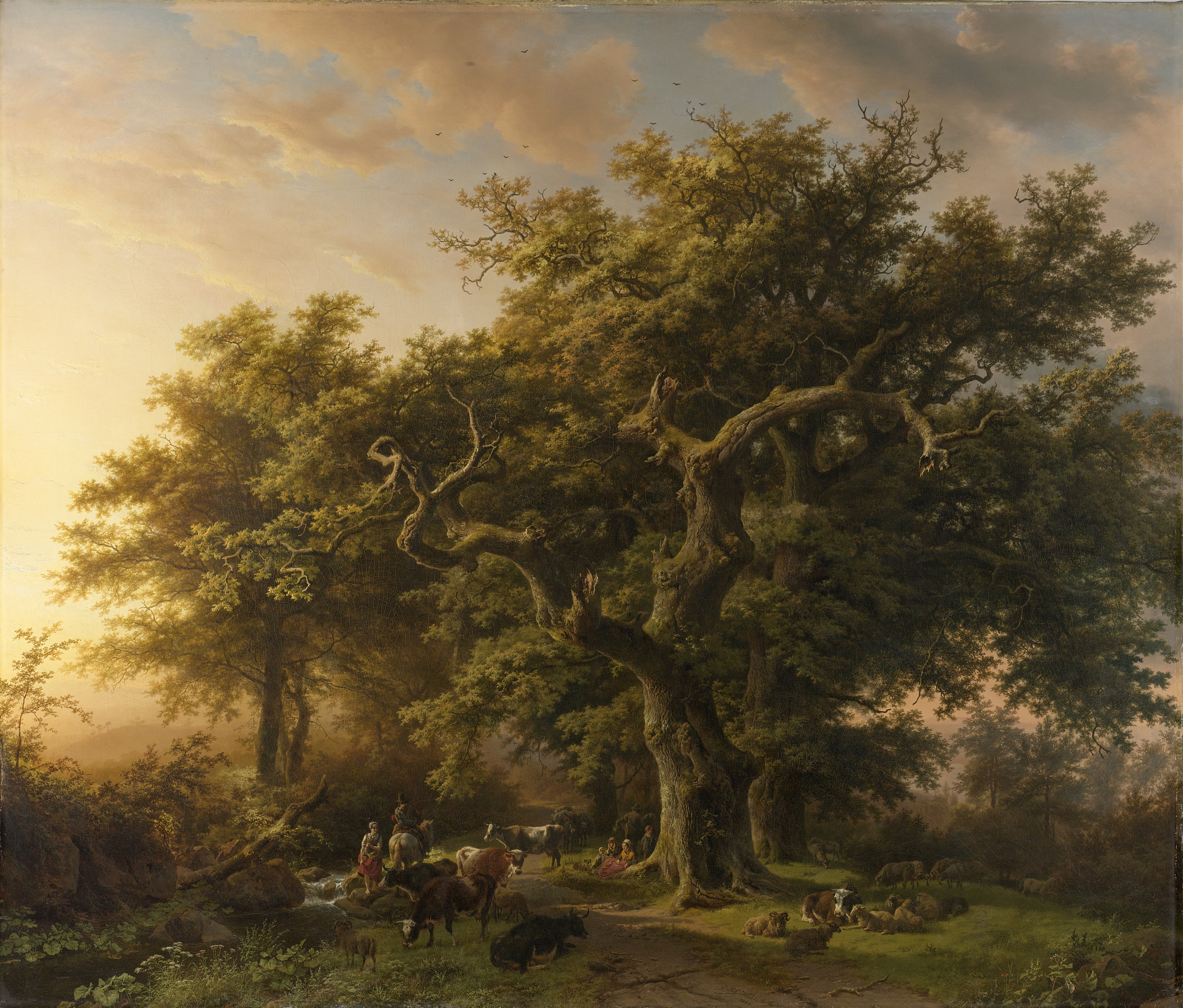
Barend Cornelis Koekkoek

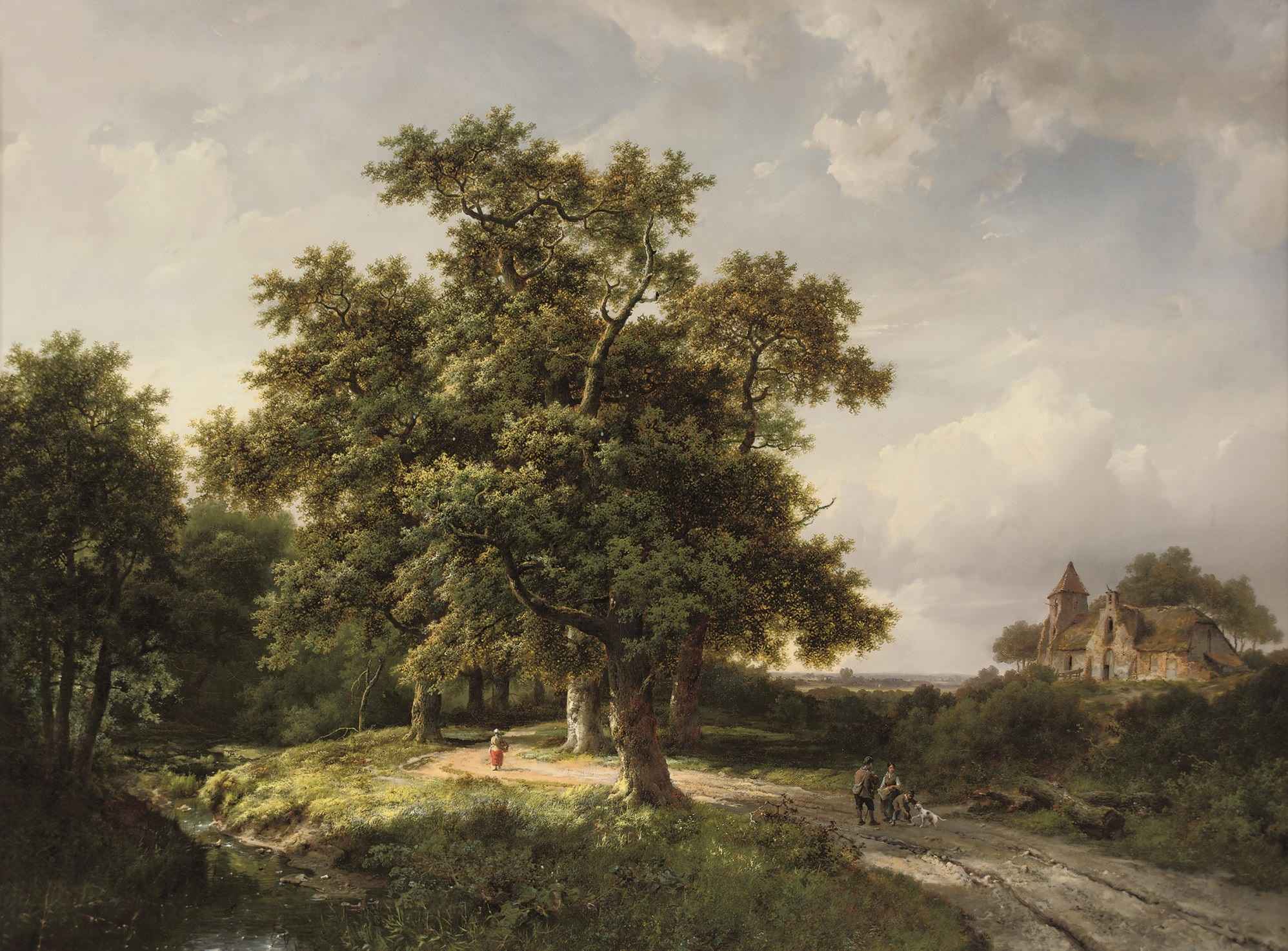
Marinus Adriaan Koekkoek

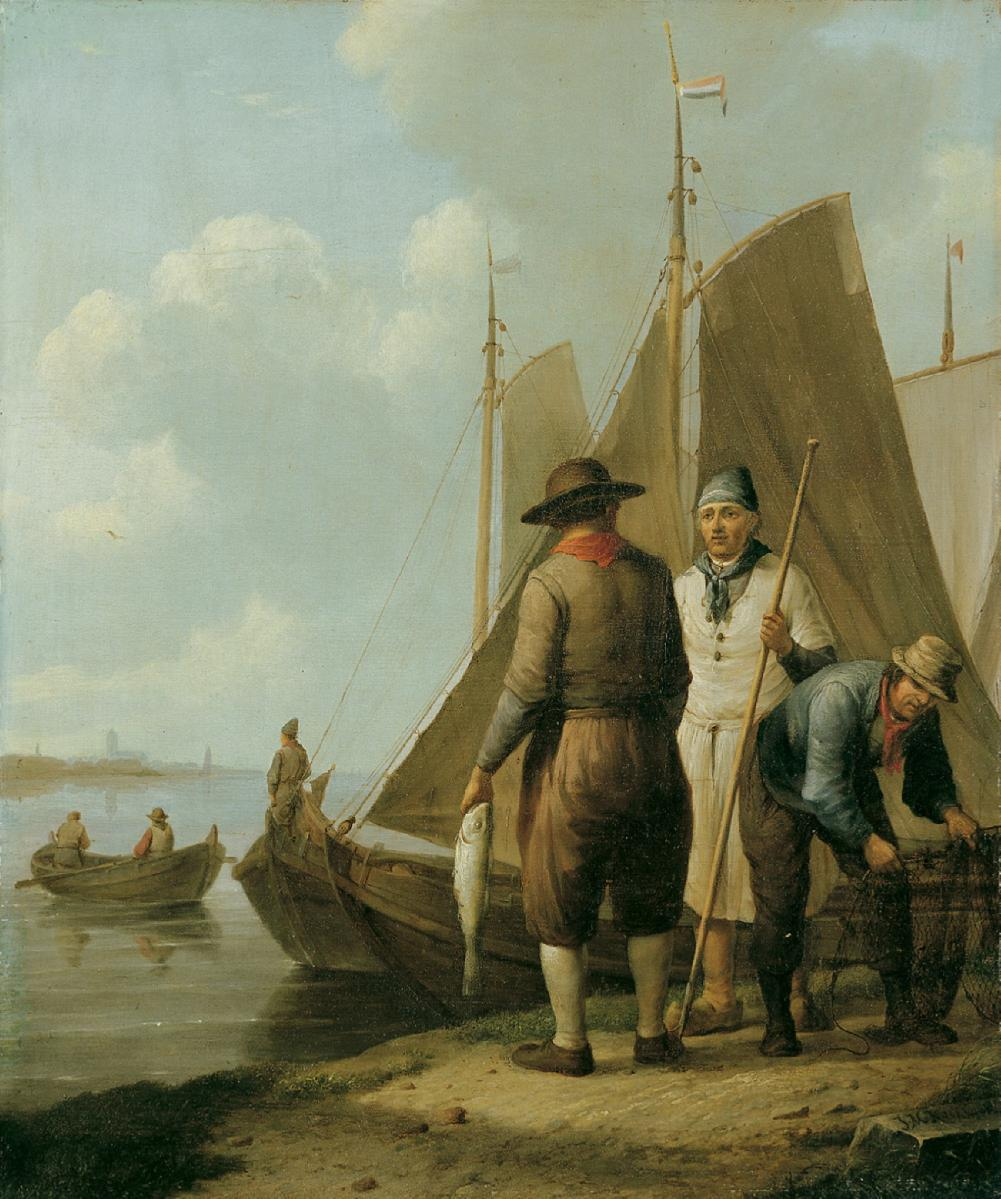
Johannes Koekkoek

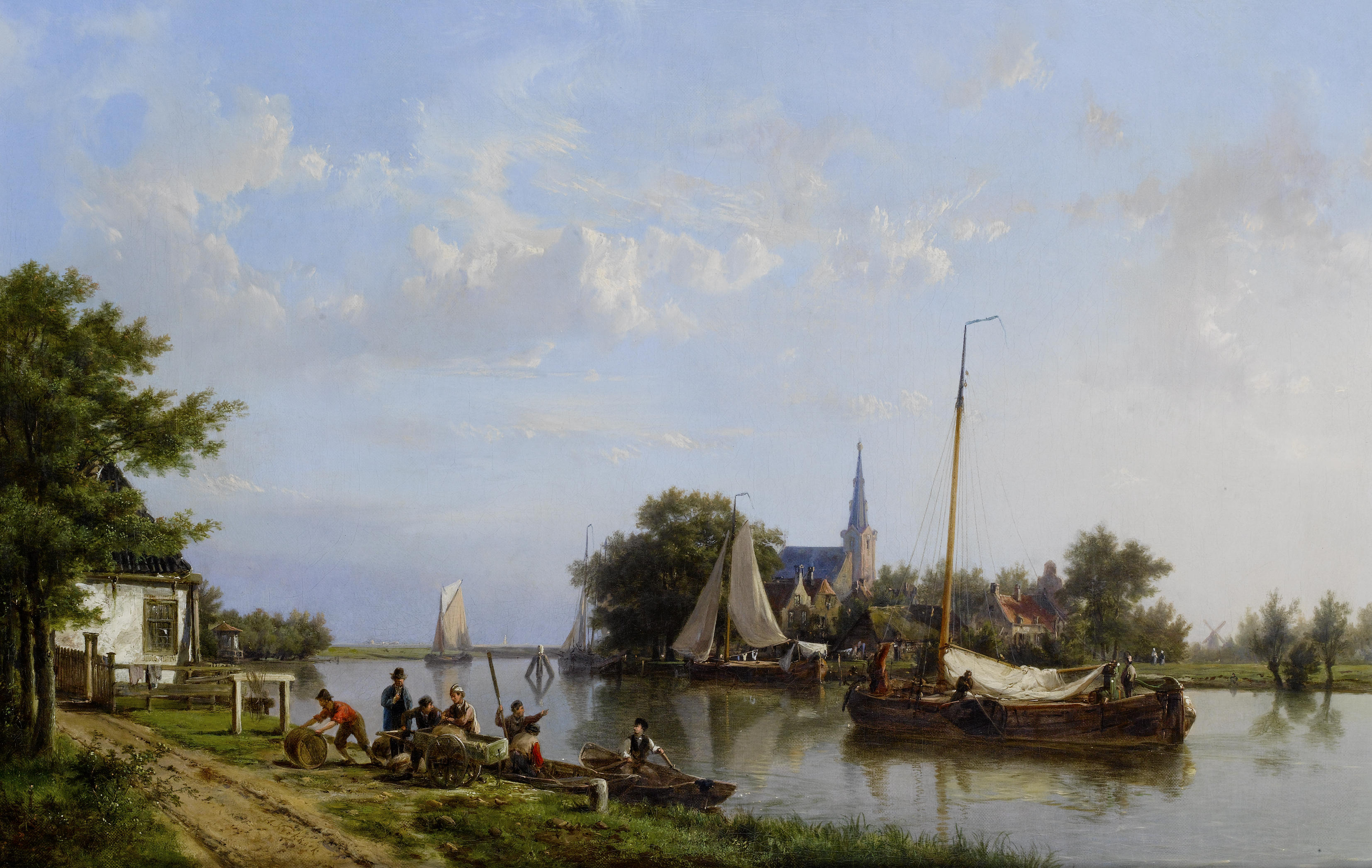
Hermanus Koekkoek

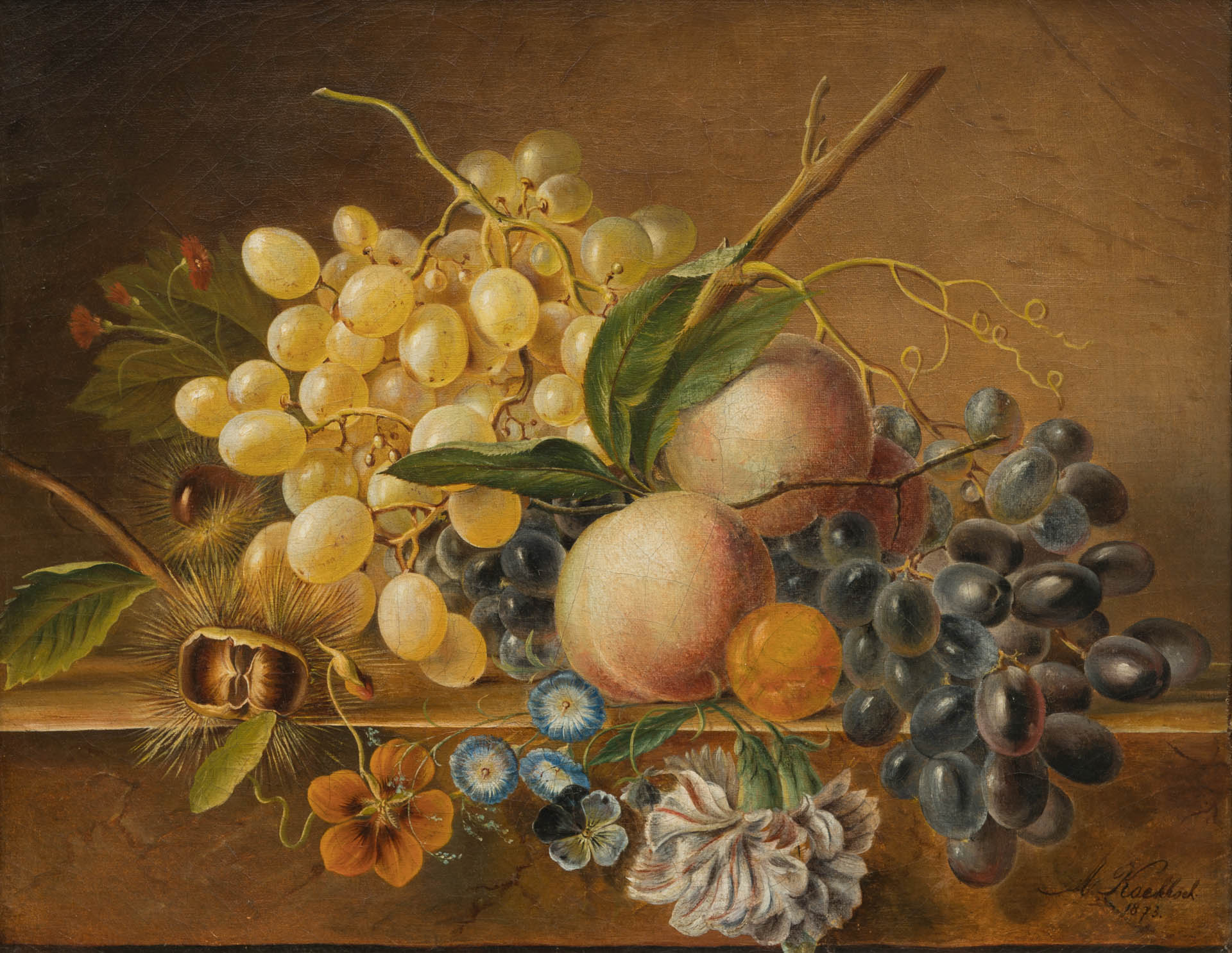
Adèle Koekkoek

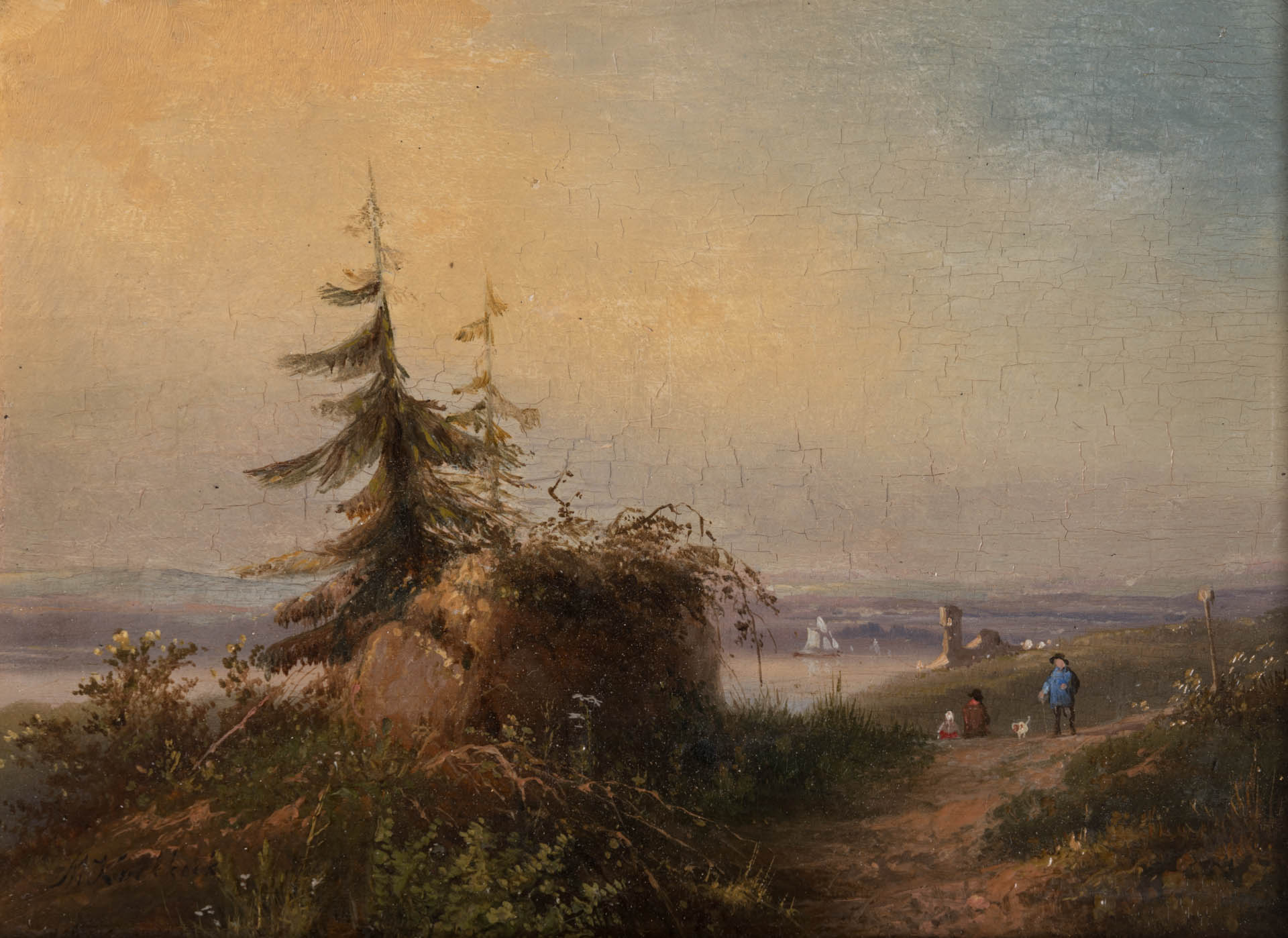
Maria Louise Koekkoek

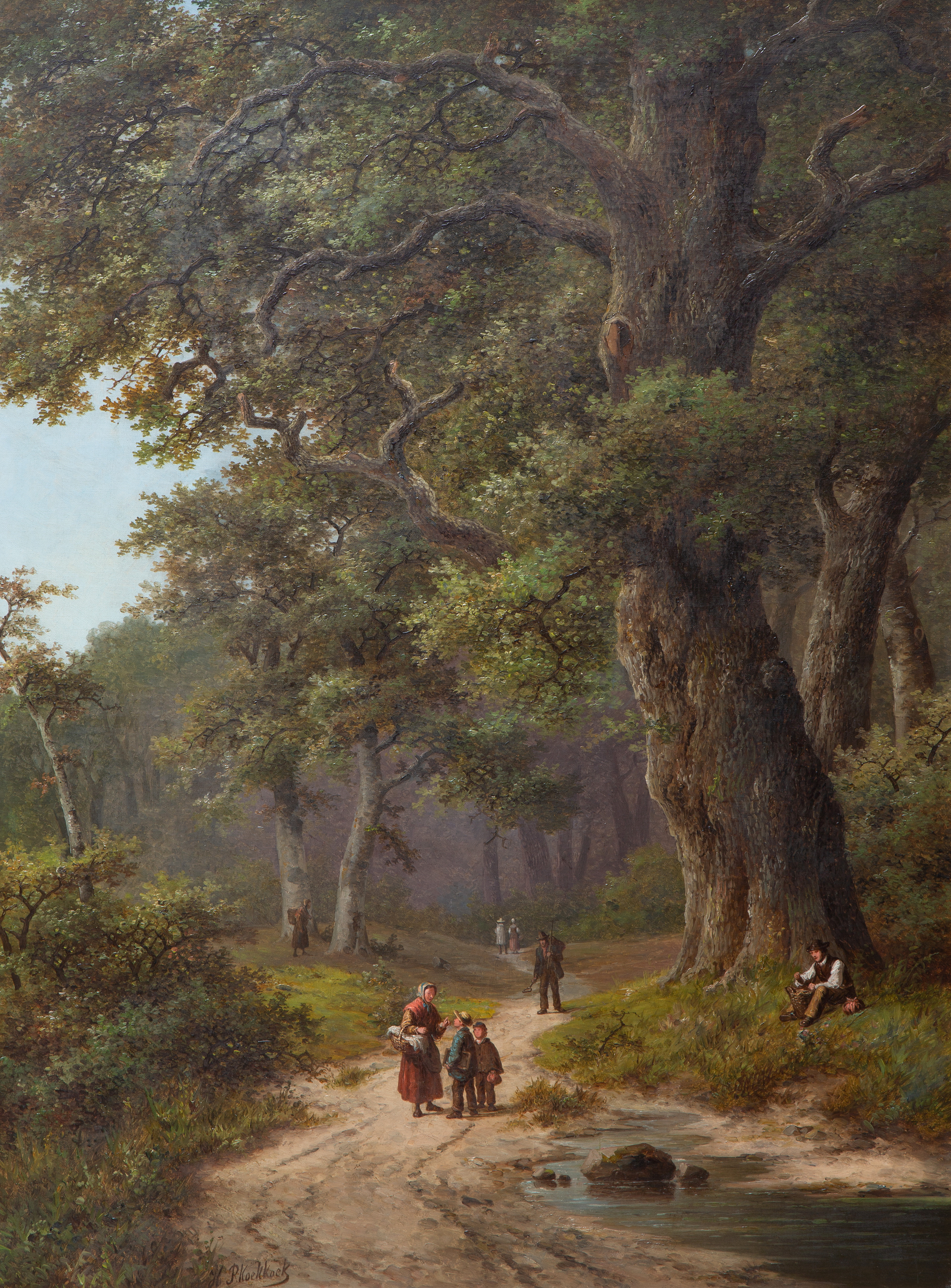
Hendrik Pieter Koekkoek

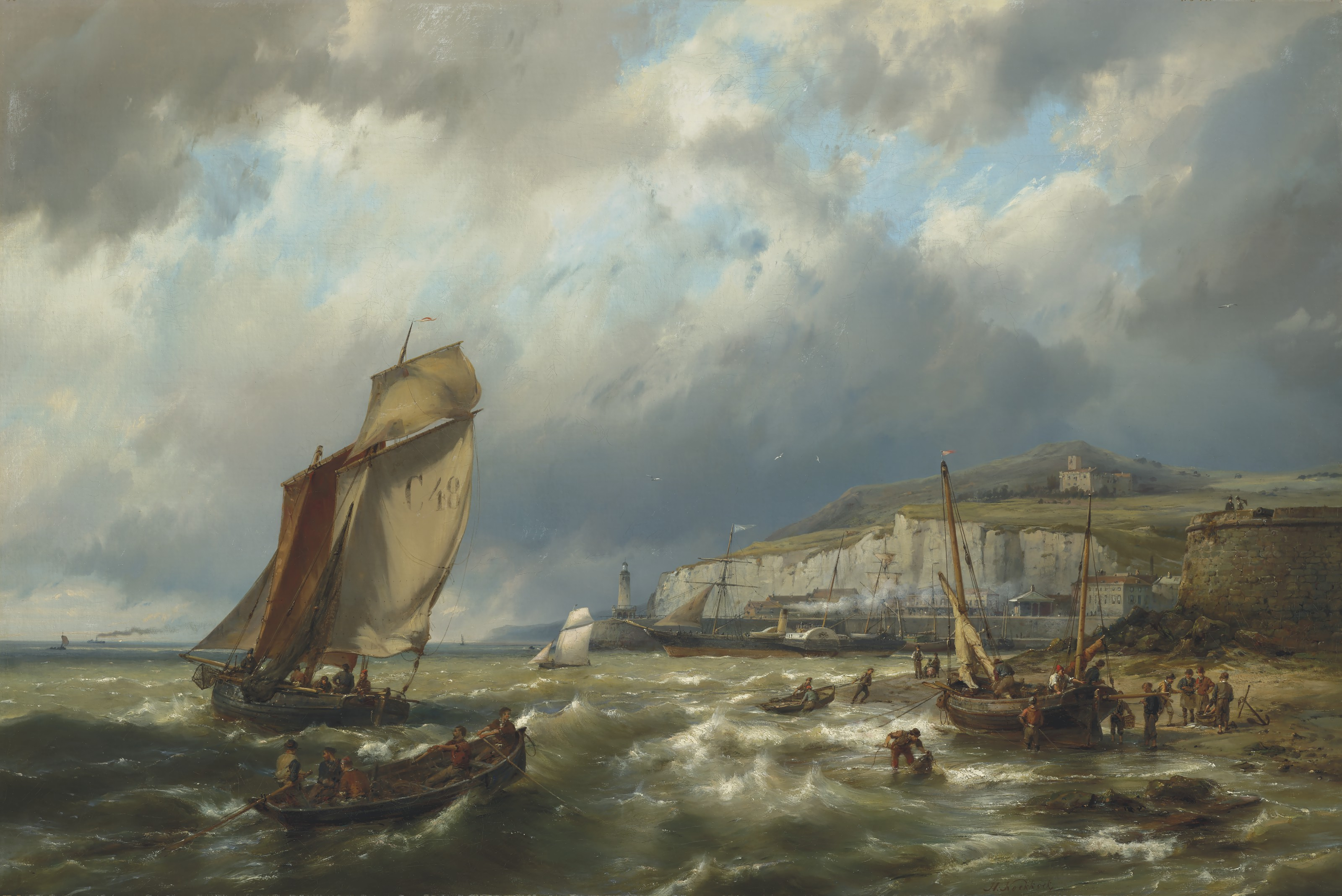
Hermanus Koekkoek Jr

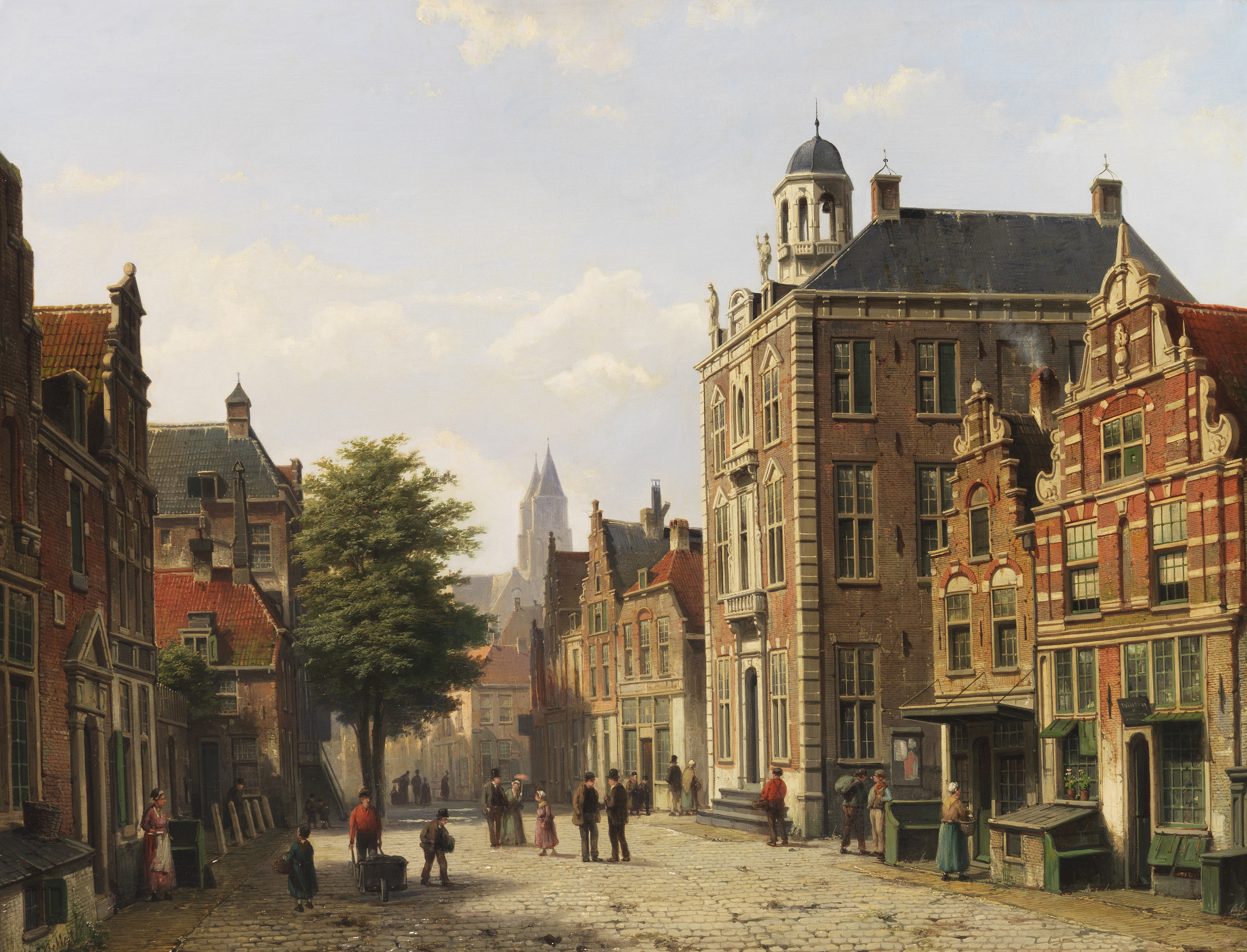
Willem Koekkoek

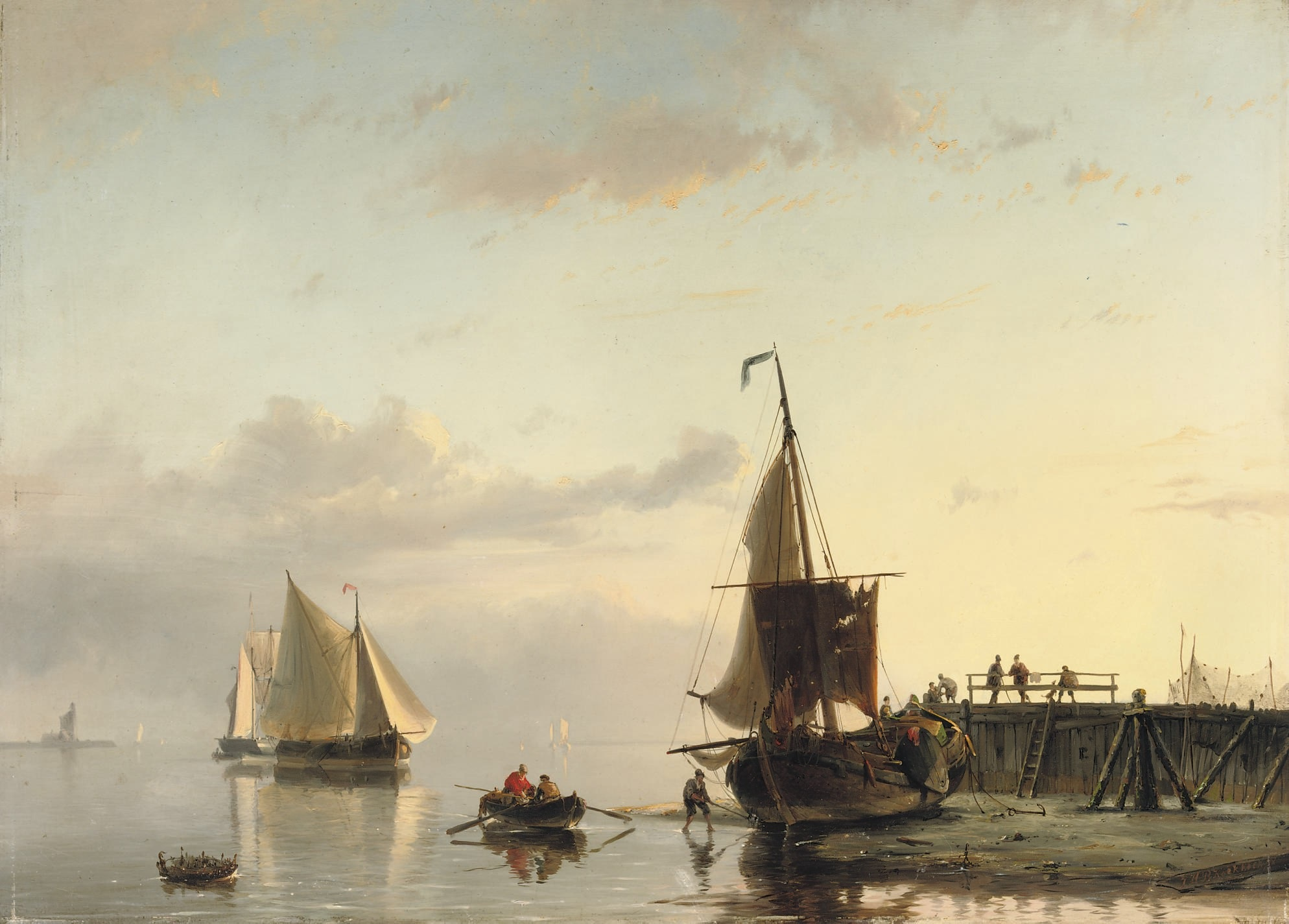
Johannes Hermanus Barend Koekkoek

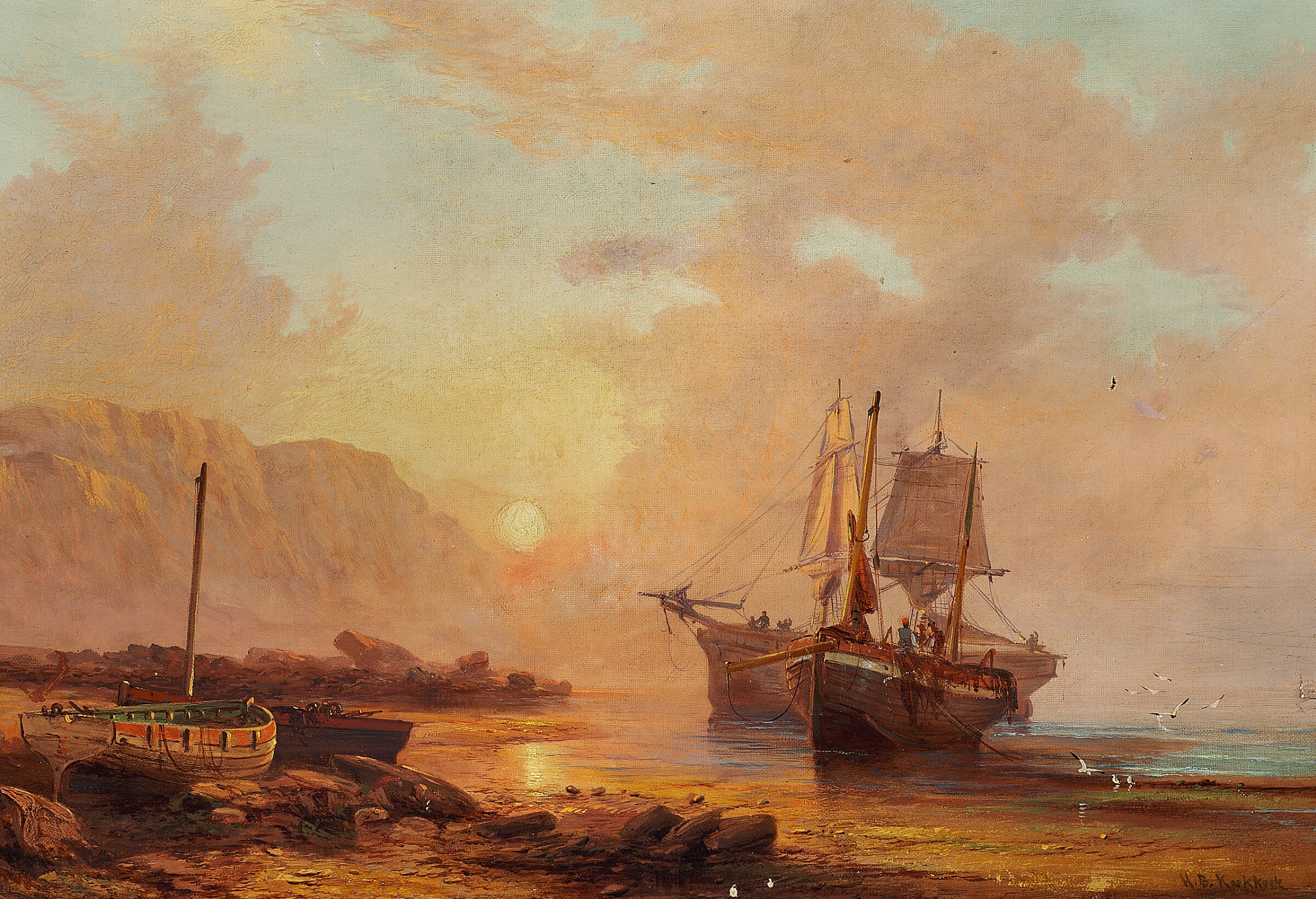
Hendrik Barend Koekkoek

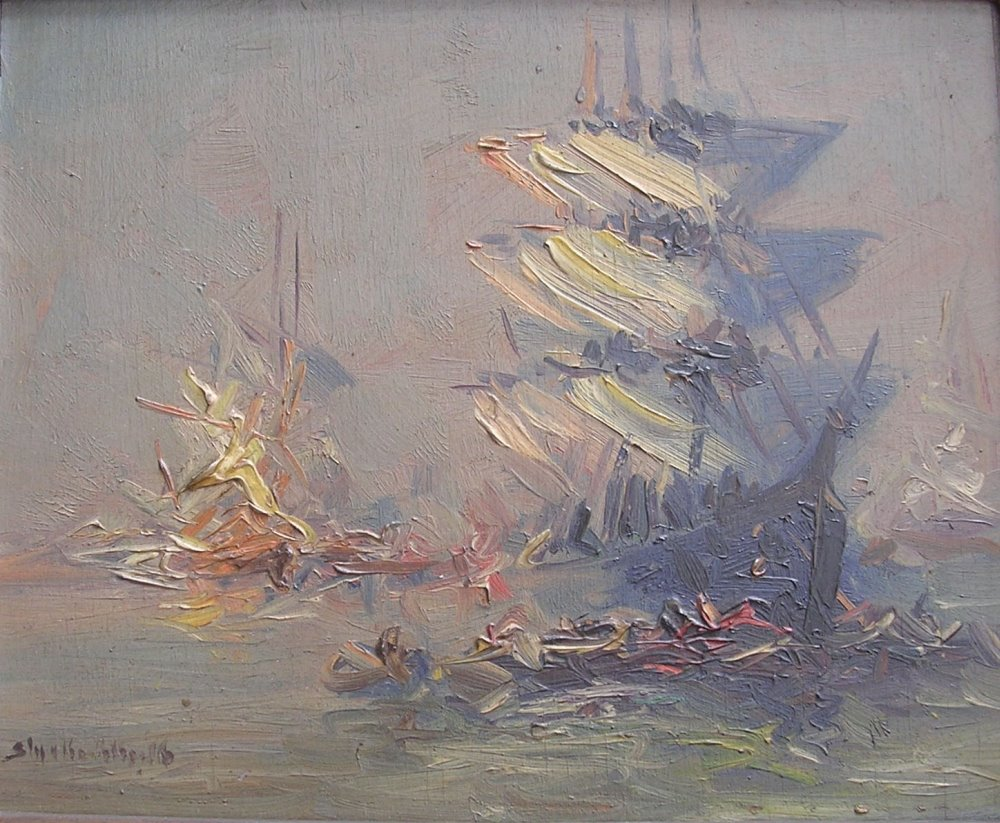
Stephen Robert Koekkoek

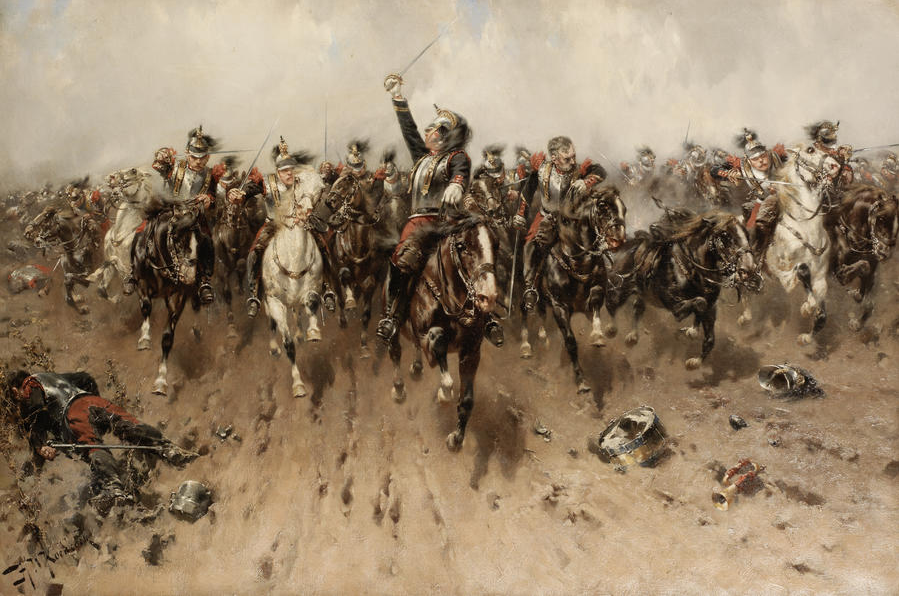
Hermanus Willem Koekkoek

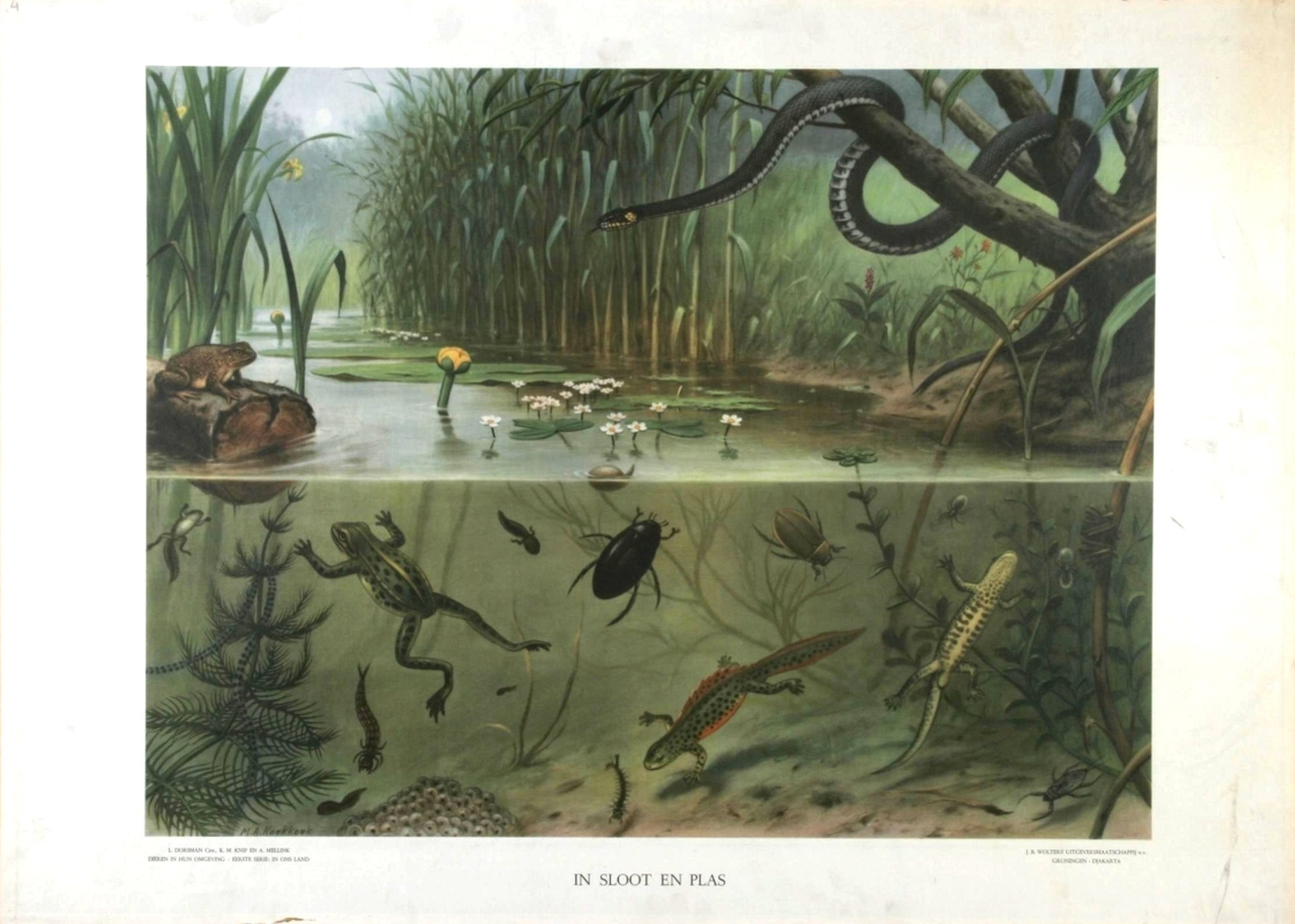
Marinus Adrianus Koekkoek

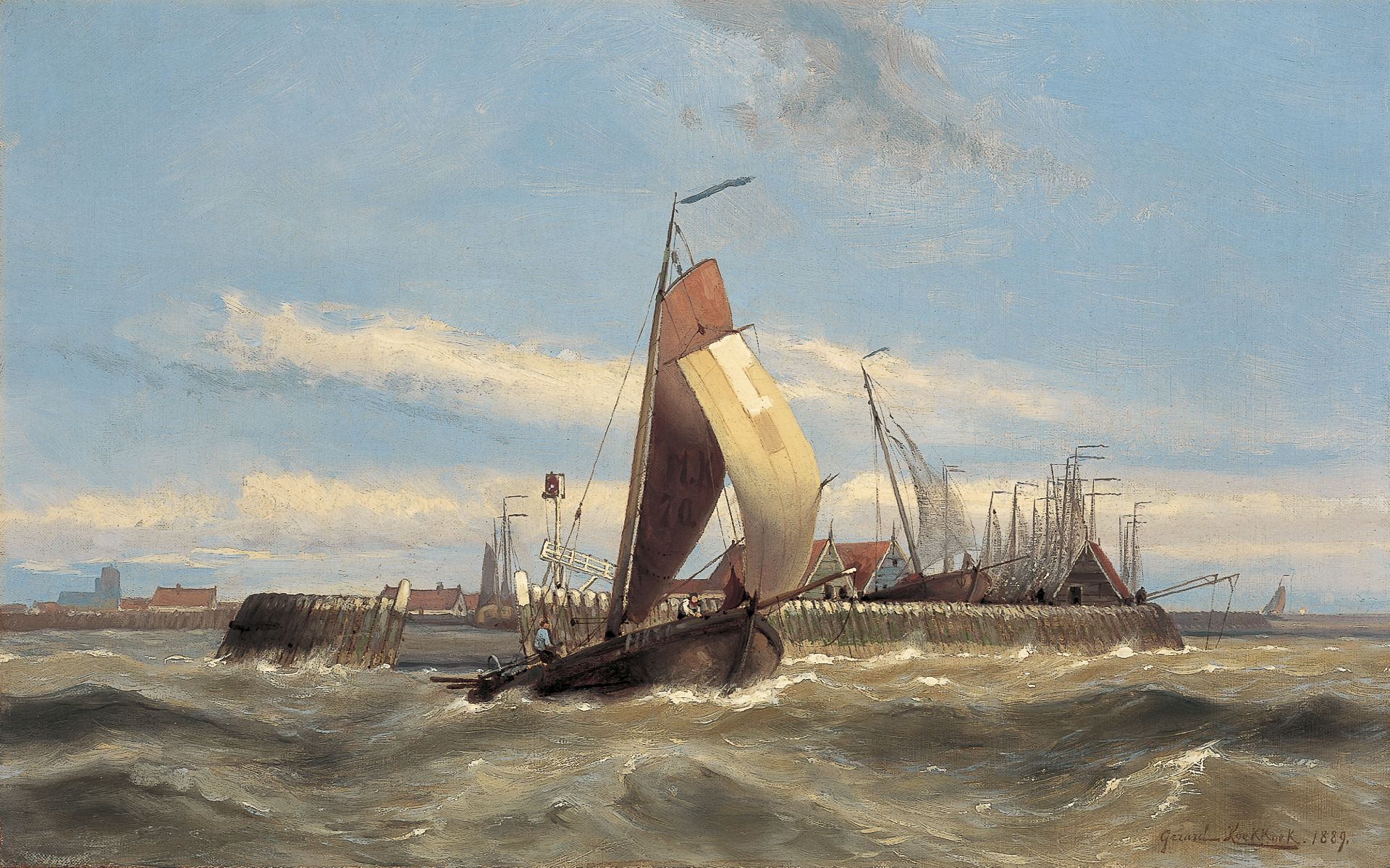
Gerardus Johannes Koekkoek

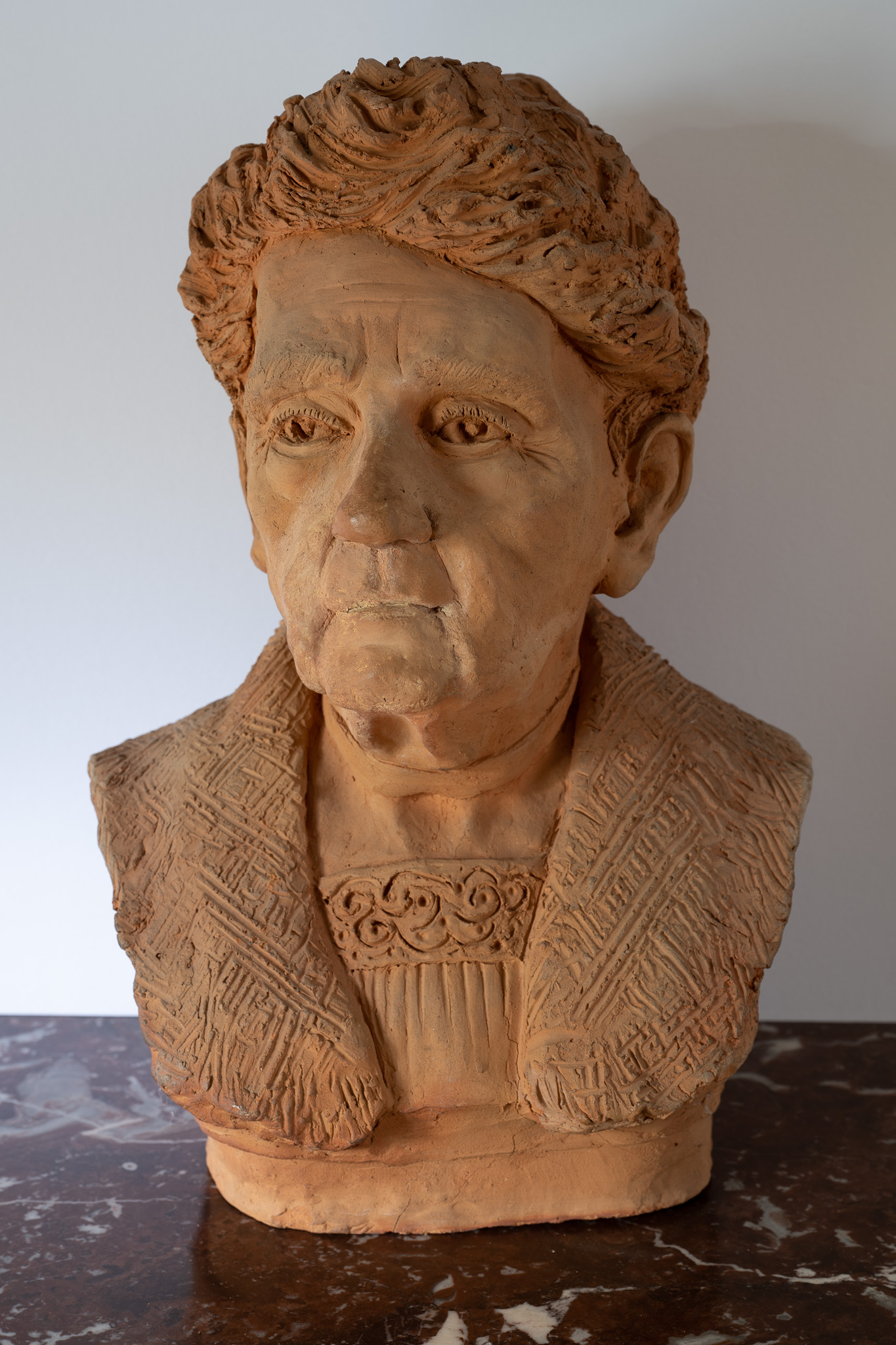
Louise Hermina Carry May Koekkoek

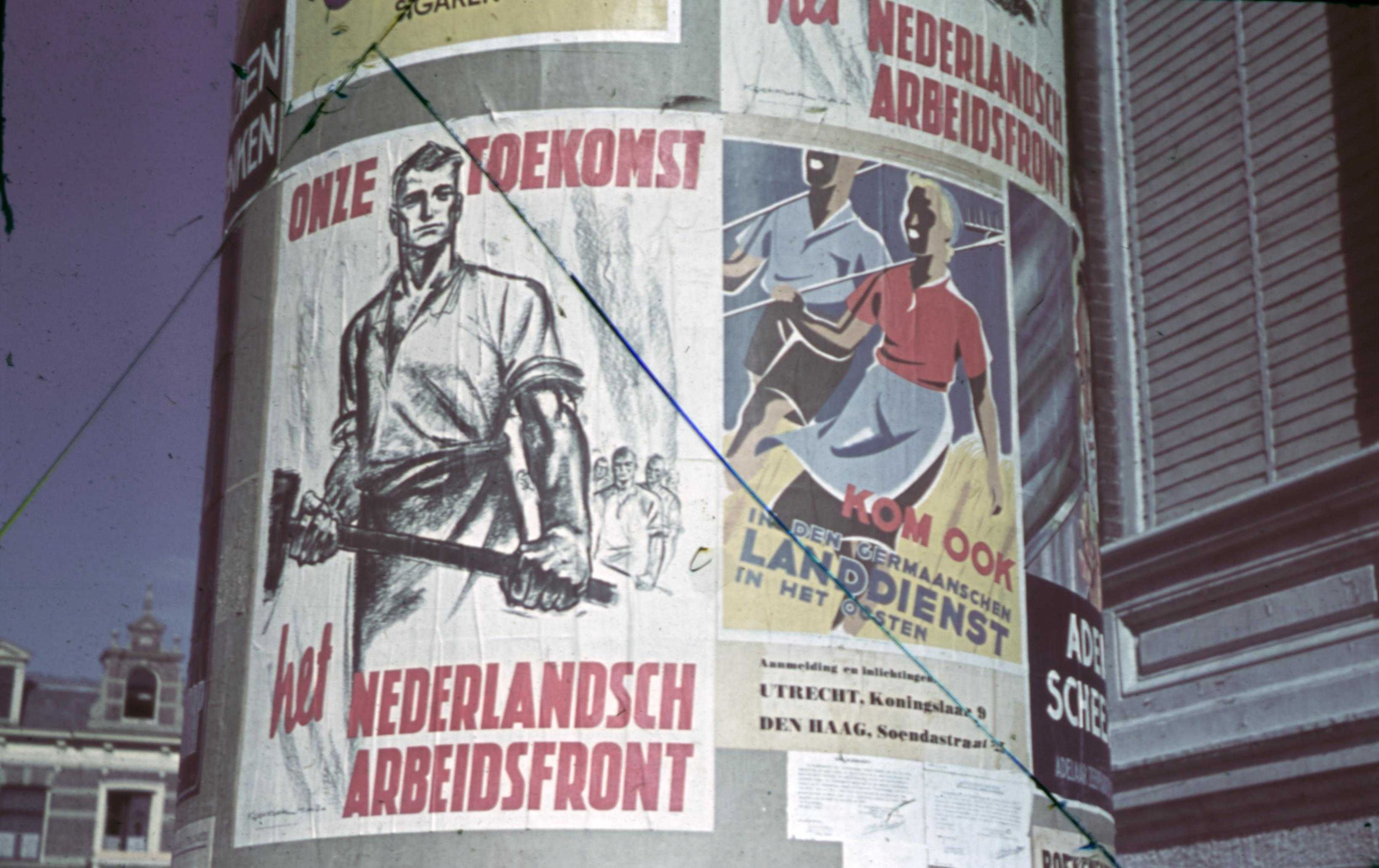
Cornelis Koekkoek (poster on the left)

== See also ==
- Romantic art, the general artistic movement most Koekkoek painters followed
- Brueghel family, a mostly 16th- and 17th-century family of Dutch and Flemish artists
- Van Huysum family, a 17th- and 18th-century family of Dutch visual artists
- Devriès family, a mostly 19th- and 20th-century family of operatic singers of Dutch descent
