= Adriana van Ravenswaay =

Dutch painter

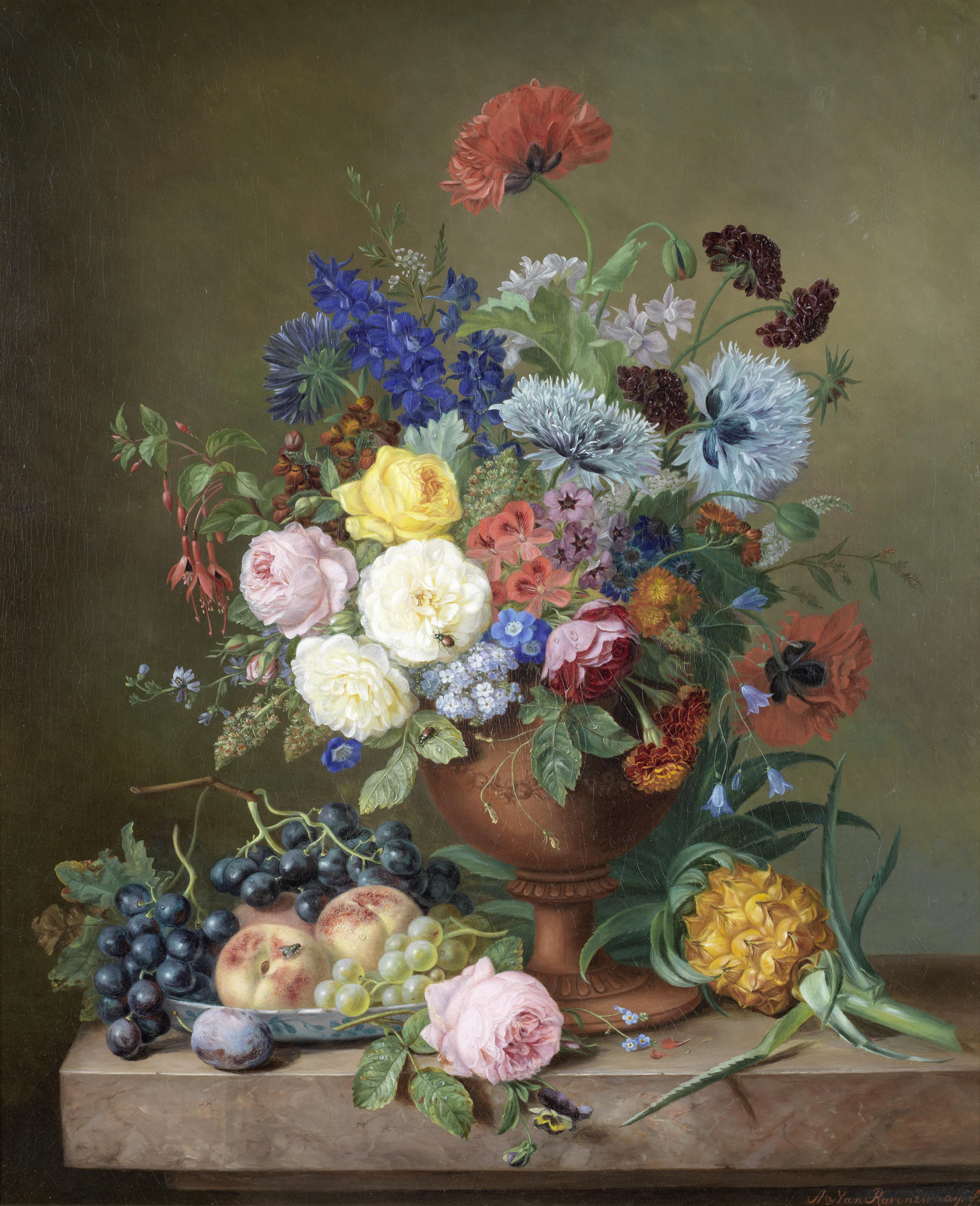
A vase of mixed flowers and fruit on a marble ledge

Adriana van Ravenswaay (1816–1872), was a Dutch painter.

== Biography ==
She was born in Hilversum, United Kingdom of the Netherlands, as the sister of the painter Johannes van Ravenswaay (1815–1849), and like her brother probably had lessons from her uncle Jan van Ravenswaay.

She is known for fruit and flower still lifes and spent her life and worked in Hilversum.
