= Jordanus Hoorn =

Dutch painter and drawing teacher

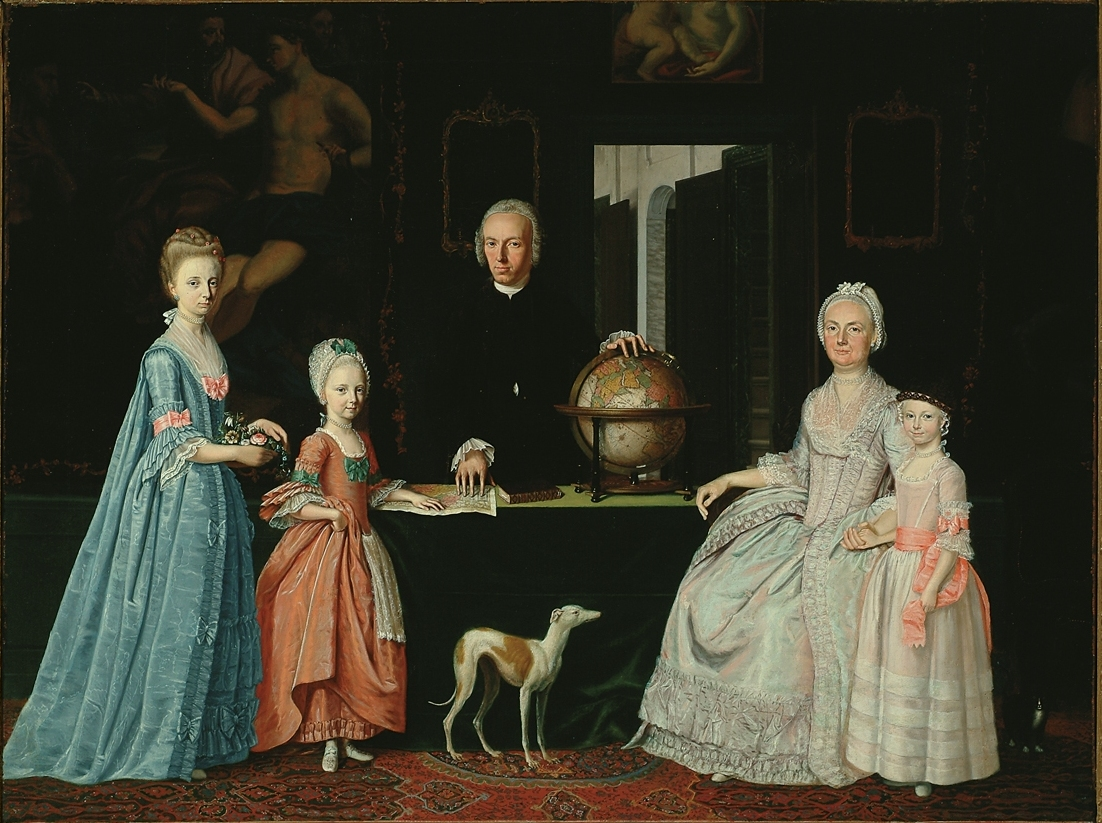
Portrait of Gerrit Willem van Oosten de Bruyn with his scientific instruments and family, 1774

Jordanus Hoorn (1753–1833) was a painter and drawing teacher from the Netherlands.

== Biography ==
Hoorn was born and died in Amersfoort. According to the RKD he was the son of a cloth merchant who became a pupil of the landscape painter Gerrit Toorenburgh and who worked in Haarlem 1772-1795, including a period as drawing master for the Tekenschool voor Kunstambachten. In 1795 under French rule, he returned to Amersfoort where he was appointed city drawing master. His pupils were Jan van Ravenswaay, Jan Apeldoorn, and Christiaan Wilhelmus Moorrees.
