= Jan van Ravenswaay =

Dutch painter

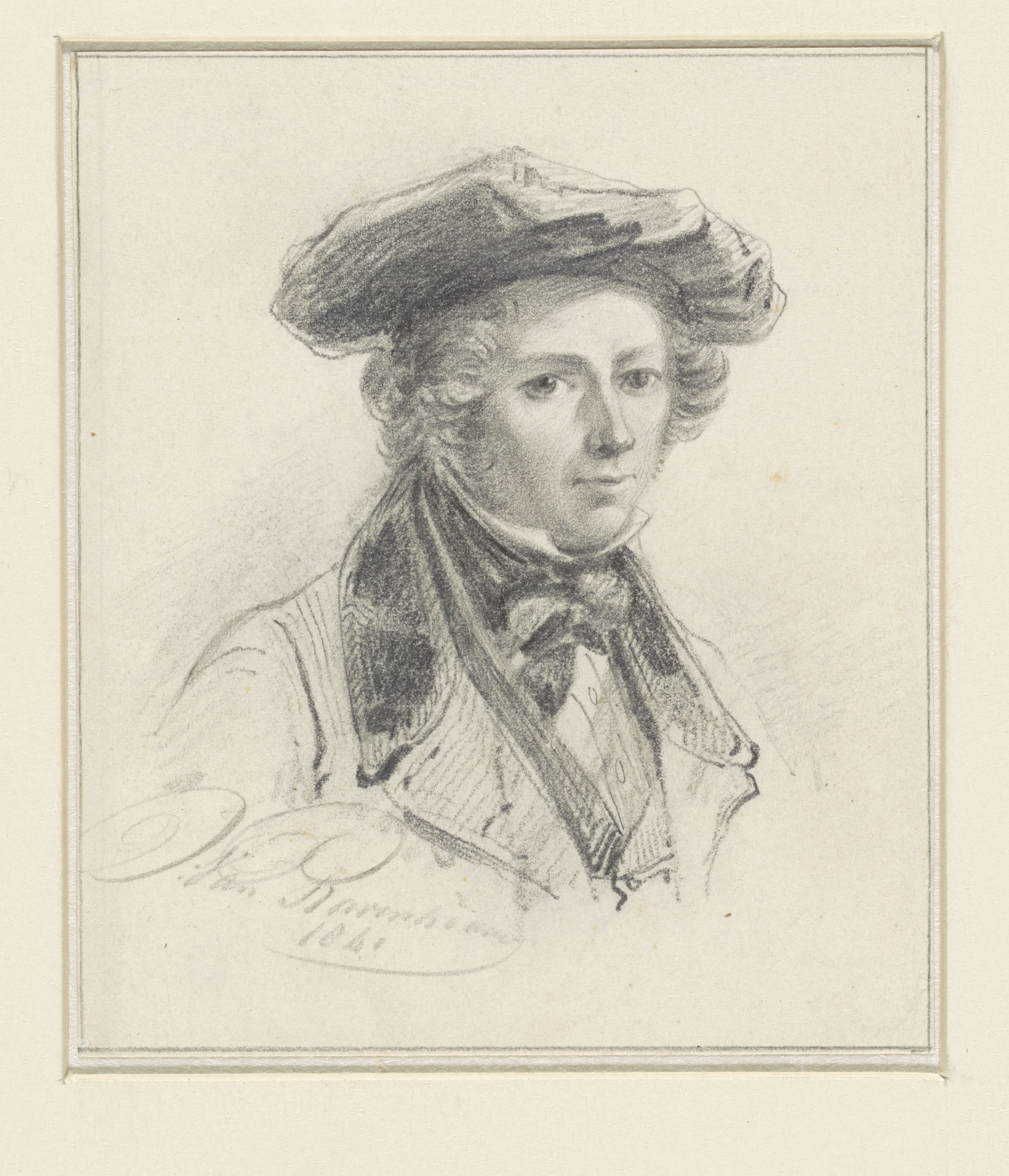
- Self-portrait of Jan van Ravenswaay
- Born: 28 November 1789; Hilversum
- Died: 2 March 1869 (aged 79); Hilversum

Jan van Ravenswaay (28 November 1789, Hilversum - 2 March 1869, Hilversum) was a 19th-century landscape painter from the Netherlands. He was born in the town of Hilversum

== Biography ==
Ravenswaay was the son of a cotton mill owner in Hilversum. He studied drawing with Jordanus Hoorn in Amstersfoort, before following lessons from Pieter Gerardus van Os. He traveled in Belgium, Germany and Switzerland before becoming a member of the Royal Academy of Art in Amsterdam. He won an honorable mention for a landscape in a competition at Felix Meritis in 1818. In 1832, Jan became a member of the artist society Arti Sacrum in Rotterdam.

Noteworthy among his pupils were Jacobus Theodorus Abels and Remigius Adrianus Haanen. (Note: His pupils were Jacobus Theodorus Abels, Andreas Danekes, Pierre Louis Dubourcq, Remigius Adrianus Haanen, Reinier van Harderwijk, Frederik Marinus Kruseman, Pieter Plas, his nephew Johannes van Ravenswaay, Johannes Rentinck, James de Rijk, Albertus Steenbergen, and Albertus Verhoesen) His niece Adriana van Ravenswaay also became a painter.
