= Jan Apeldoorn =

Dutch painter (1765–1838)

- Born: 27 January 1765; Amersfoort, Dutch Republic
- Died: 10 February 1838 (aged 73); Amersfoort, Netherlands

Jan Apeldoorn (27 January 1765, Amersfoort – 10 February 1838, Amersfoort) was a Dutch landscape painter, watercolorist, draftsman, art teacher, and miniaturist painter.

Apeldoorn was a pupil of Jordan Hoorn in Amersfoort. He painted only few pictures in oil. He lived in Utrecht for fifty years (from 1788 to 1838), but died in his native town in 1838.
