= Arti Sacrum =

Arti sacrum (Latin for "sacred art") is a Dutch artists' society located in Rotterdam, Netherlands.

== Members ==
- Petrus van Schendel
- Jan van Ravenswaay
