= Jacob Abels =

Dutch painter

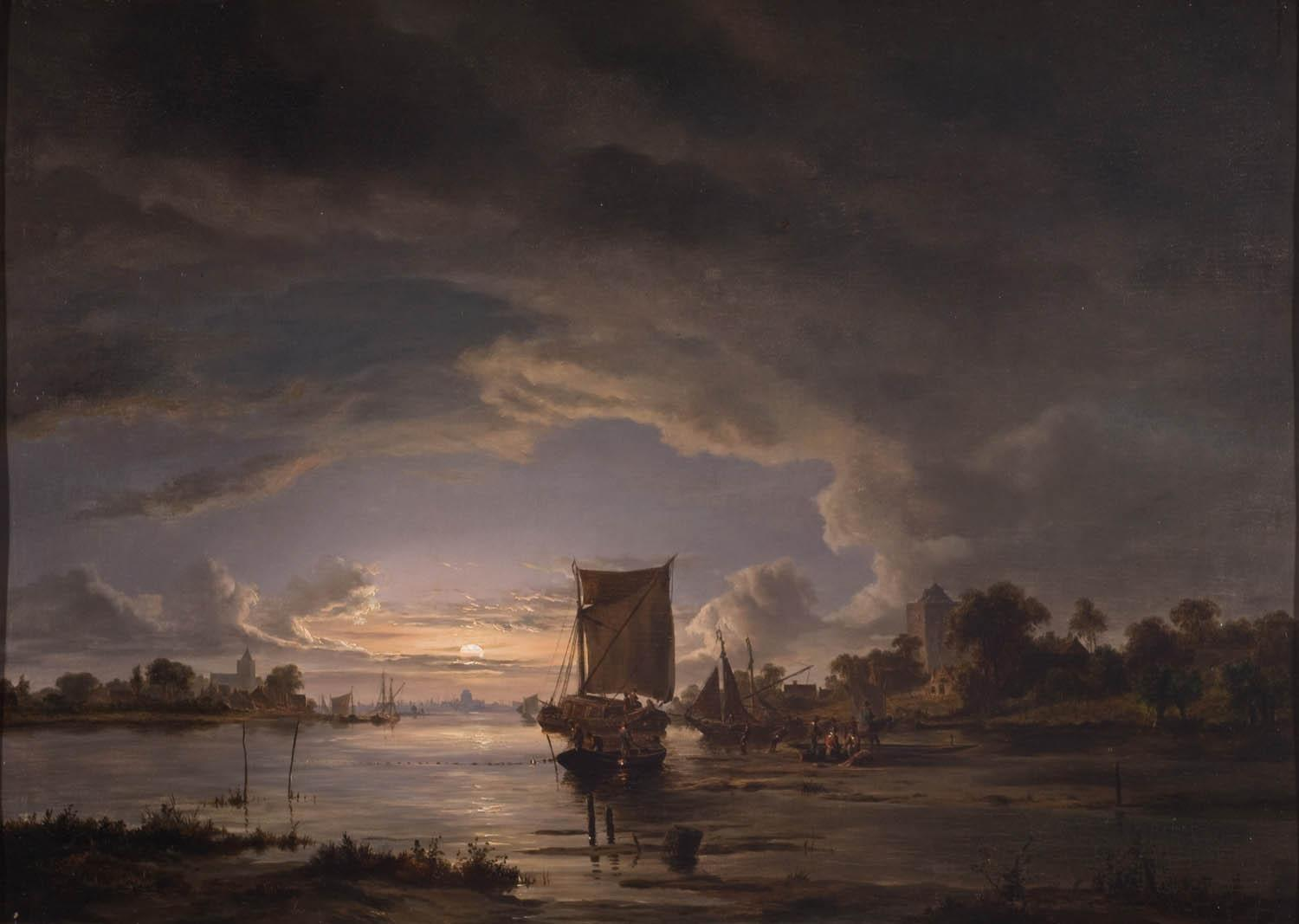
An Extensive River Scene with Sailboat, Rademakers Collection

Jacobus Theodorus "Jacob" Abels (1803–1866) was a Dutch painter.

== Life ==
Abels was born in Amsterdam in 1803. He was a pupil of the animal painter Jan van Ravenswaay. In 1826 Abels had visited Germany, and on his return settled at the Hague. His wife was the daughter of Pieter Os. Between 1849 and 1853 he lived in Haarlem and later he moved to Arnhem.

He was especially noted for his paintings of moonlit landscapes. The Museum at Haarlem has works painted by him.

Abels died at Abcoude on 11 June 1866.
