= Denis Wirtz =

Belgian molecular biologist (born 1965)

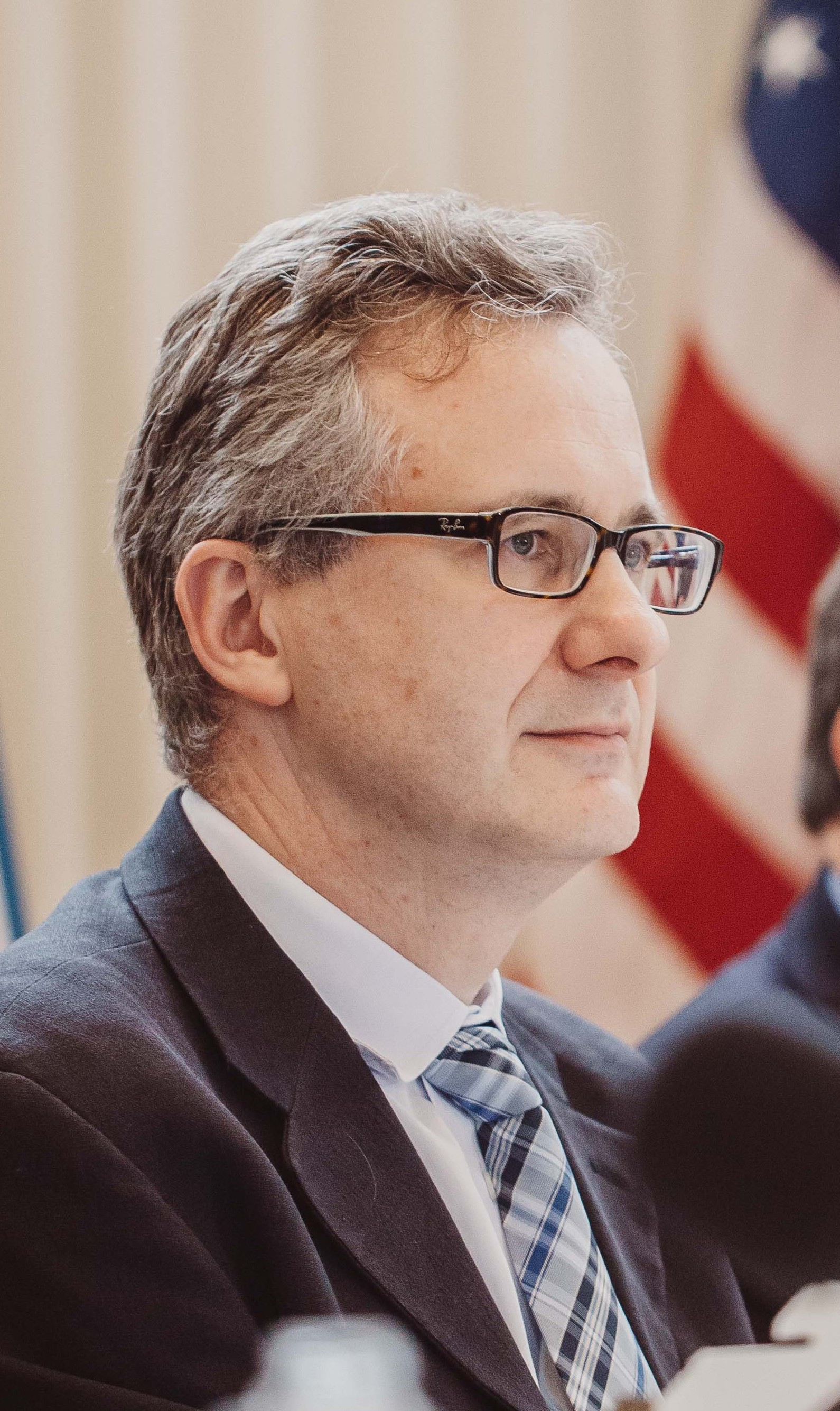
- Born: Denis Wirtz; February 20, 1965 (age 61); Brussels, Belgium
- Education: Université libre de Bruxelles (B.S.); Stanford University(M.S., Ph.D.)
- Known for: 3D Cell Motility; Digital Pathology; Cancer Metastasis; Nuclear dynamics Tumor Microenvironment; Particle-tracking Microrheology
- Awards: Fellow of the American Physical Society; Fellow of the American Association for the Advancement of Science (AAAS Fellow); Fellow of the American Institute for Medical and Biological Engineering; National Science Foundation CAREER Award; Biomedical Engineering Foundation Award, Whitaker Foundation; Hoover Fellow, Belgian American Educational Foundation; Fellow of the Belgian Royal Academy of Medicine (ARMB)
- Scientific career
- Fields: Chemical engineering, biomolecular engineering, pathology, oncology, materials science
- Workplaces: Johns Hopkins University
- Doctoral advisor: Gerald G. Fuller(Ph.D.); Pierre-Gilles de Gennes(Postdoctoral Fellowship)
- Website: wirtzlab.johnshopkins.edu

Denis Wirtz is the vice provost for research and Theophilus Halley Smoot Professor of Engineering Science at Johns Hopkins University. He is an expert in the molecular and biophysical mechanisms of cell motility and adhesion and nuclear dynamics in health and disease.

Wirtz was the first to establish how a three-dimensional environment fundamentally affects the way cancer cells migrate, providing more biologically and medically relevant information than two-dimensional studies. He also pioneered the technique of particle-tracking microrheology to probe the rheological properties of complex fluids and living cells and tissues. He is a professor in the Departments of Chemical Engineering & Biomolecular Engineering and Materials Science & Engineering in the Whiting School of Engineering, and in the Departments of Oncology and Pathology in the Johns Hopkins School of Medicine.

Wirtz was named vice provost for research in February 2014, charged with directing the university's $2.24 billion research enterprise, implementing institutional research compliance, expanding research development, and producing and managing cross-divisional research initiatives, such as the Johns Hopkins Catalyst and Discovery Awards program, the President's Frontier Award program, and the Bloomberg Distinguished Professorships, which were established as part of a $350 million gift by Michael Bloomberg.

== Biography ==
Wirtz was born in the Ixelles municipality of Brussels, Belgium. He is fluent in English and French, and became a U.S. citizen in 2007. Wirtz earned a physics engineering degree at the Ecole Polytechnique of the Université libre de Bruxelles in 1988.

With a Hoover Fellowship from the Belgian American Educational Foundation (BAEF), he earned an M.S. and Ph.D in Chemical Engineering from Stanford University, working in polymer physics. He was then granted a fellowship through the European Union’s Human Capital and Mobility program to conduct postdoctoral research at the Ecole Supérieure de Physique et Chimie Industrielles (ESPCI) in Paris, France.

Wirtz joined the faculty of the Department of Chemical and Biomolecular Engineering at Johns Hopkins University in 1994 and was promoted to the rank of full professor in 2003. In 2009, he was selected to be the Theophilus Halley Smoot Professor of Engineering Science with secondary appointments in the departments of Materials Science and Engineering, Pathology and Oncology, where he collaborates with fellow researchers in the Sidney Kimmel Comprehensive Cancer Center.

Upon his appointment as the Theophilius Halley Smoot Professor of Engineering Physics, Dr. Nicholas Jones, former dean of the Whiting School of Engineering, stated

"Throughout his time at Johns Hopkins, Denis has distinguished himself as an outstanding scholar and teacher. Additionally, Denis’ role as a catalyst for interdisciplinary research and collaboration at the university has proven extremely effective, both in terms of the research he conducts and the support he has attracted over the years. I am confident that his current research into the physical basis for cell adhesion and de-adhesion will prove critical to our understanding of the metastasis of cancer and enable important breakthroughs in the diagnosis and treatment of cancer in the years to come."

In February 2014, Wirtz was named the vice provost for research at Johns Hopkins . In announcing the Wirtz's appointment, Provost Robert C. Lieberman stated,

"As is obvious to all who know him, Denis is an extremely productive and accomplished faculty member and a wonderful colleague. Those traits will serve both Denis and the university as he works with me to support important multidisciplinary research projects, including the strategic initiatives identified in the campaign, the Bloomberg Distinguished Professorships, and multidivisional proposals in response to RFAs (requests for applications)."

=== Vice provost ===
In his role as vice provost for research, Wirtz has recruited nearly two dozen faculty to join Johns Hopkins University as Bloomberg Distinguished Professors, managed the inaugural year of the Catalyst and Discovery Awards, and the first two President's Frontier Awards. He has expanded the university's research development efforts, creating a weekly digest of limited submission opportunities, a list of more than 175 funding opportunities for postdoctoral researchers, a list of more than 330 funding opportunities for early career faculty, and consolidated monthly digests of internal funding opportunities at the institution. He also consolidated multiple research administration offices into a central research administration team, Johns Hopkins University Research Administration. As director of the university's Signature Initiatives, he has overseen the launch of two new signature initiatives on big data, led by Alex Szalay, and space studies, Space@Hopkins, led by Charles L. Bennett. These are in addition to Kathryn Edin’s 21st Century Cities Initiative, Barbara Landau’s Science of Learning Institute, Scott Zeger’s Individualized Health Initiative, and David Peters’ Global Health Signature Initiative.

Wirtz also directs the Johns Hopkins Physical Sciences-Oncology Center (PSOC), which is part of a network of twelve centers in the United States funded by the National Institutes of Health’s National Cancer Institute to link the physical sciences with the study of cancer. When the center was established with a $14.8M grant in 2009, Wirtz stated,

"For too long, not enough room has been made for nonconventional and nonbiological concepts borrowed from modern physics and engineering to tackle this disease. It is time to bring to the table ideas grounded in chemical and biomolecular engineering principles to develop new therapies and diagnostic tools. [The National Cancer Institute has] given us major funding for a center to study all the steps in the metastatic cascade."

The PSOC is part of the Johns Hopkins Institute for NanoBioTechnology (INBT), which Wirtz co-founded and acts as associate director. INBT was launched in 2006 to "promote multidisciplinary research at the interface of nanotechnology and medicine." With more than 250 affiliated faculty members from the Johns Hopkins schools of Engineering, Arts and Sciences, Medicine, and Public Health and scientists from the Applied Physics Laboratory, the institute is home to several center grants and numerous education, training, and outreach programs. INBT counts Becton Dickinson, MedImmune, Northrop Grumman, Secant Medical, and Under Armour among its corporate partners, and Wirtz has previously served as a Nikon Partner in Science since 2008.

Wirtz is the PI of a National Science Foundation Research Experiences for Undergraduates (REU) site in the Nanotechnology for Biology and Bioengineering program. Wirtz also founded the Johns Hopkins Center for Digital Pathology that brings together pathologists, surgeons, oncologists, and engineers to develop new single-cell technology for improved diagnostic, prognostic, therapeutic approaches for human diseases, including cancer, Chronic obstructive pulmonary disease (COPD), and frailty in aging. He co-directs the Cancer Nanotechnology Training Center, another National Cancer Institute-funded entity. From 2005 to 2012, he also directed a Howard Hughes Medical Institute (HHMI) funded interdisciplinary graduate research training program in nanotechnology for biology and medicine. The program aimed to produce researchers able to create new particles and materials to be used in the detection, treatment, prevention, and cure of human disease. It recruited students from biochemistry, chemistry, physics, biology, and engineering, while making a special effort to include minorities under-represented in science.

=== Awards and distinctions ===
Wirtz was elected fellow of the American Institute for Medical and Biological Engineering in 2006 for "major contributions in molecular cell mechanics and the development of particle tracking methods for cell and molecular biology." In 2009, he was elected fellow of the American Association for the Advancement of Science in 2009 "for contributions to cell micromechanics and cell adhesion and for the development and application of particle tracking methods to probe the micromechanical properties of living cells in normal conditions and disease state." Wirtz was elected fellow of the American Physical Society in 2010 for "his seminal contributions to the understanding of basic cellular functions through the development and application of novel biophysical methods grounded in statistical mechanics and polymer physics." In 2011, he was elected member of the Belgian American Educational Foundation (BAEF).

Wirtz is also a member of the American Institute of Chemical Engineers Biophysical Society, American Society for Microbiology, American Society for Cell Biology, American Society for Microbiology, and Society of Rheology.

Wirtz is a 1996 recipient of the National Science Foundation CAREER Award for: “A Research and Teaching Program in Complex Fluids Dynamics.”. In 1997, he received the Whitaker Foundation’s Biomedical Engineering Award. In collaboration with Benjamin Shapiro, Elisabeth Smela and Pamela Abshire, Wirtz was awarded the 2004 Physical Science Invention of the Year Award by the University of Maryland Office of Technology Commercialization. The team invented a Cell Sensor Based Pathogen Detection that will enable “selective pathogran detection by exploiting the signalizing machinery of living cells.

Since 2008, he has been the Editor-in-Chief of Cell Health and the Cytoskeleton. He is on the Editorial Boards of Scientific Reports, Cell Adhesion & Migration, World Journal of Biological Chemistry, and TECHNOLOGY. Wirtz formerly served on the editorial boards of Physical Biology, Journal of the Royal Society Interface Focus, Biophysical Journal, Nanomedicine: Nanotechnology, Biology and Medicine, as an ad hoc editor for the Proceedings of the National Academy of Sciences of the United States of America, as the guest editor of a Special Issue of Physical Biology on physical oncology, and as the editor of the Cell Biophysics section of Comprehensive Biophysics. Wirtz also served as an expert advisor to the study panel of the international Assessment of Physical sciences and Engineering advances in Life sciences and Oncology (APHELION), which was commissioned by the National Cancer Institute and National Science Foundation in order to “determine the status and trends of applying physical sciences and engineering principles to oncology research and development in leading laboratories and organizations in Europe via an on-site peer review process.”

Recent plenary talks include: ASME 2015 4th Global Congress on NanoEngineering for Medicine and Biology; 2015 Cell Mechanics, Morphogenesis and Pattern Formation Workshop, Isaac Newton Institute at the University of Cambridge; 2015 MRS Fall Meeting & Exhibit; 2015 American Society for Cell Biology Cell Biology Annual Meeting; 2014 Longrifles Cancer Seminar, Johns Hopkins School of Medicine; and 2014 IUTAM Symposium on Mechanics of Soft Active Materials; 2013 The Centre for Neuroscience and Cell Biology (CNC) annual conference in Coimbra, Portugal; distinguished lecturer at the Cancer Nanotechnology Training Center, University of Kentucky.

In 2019, we was elected as a foreign member of the Belgian Royal Academy of Medicine (ARMB).

== Research ==
Bridging the fields of chemical engineering, oncology, pathology, biophysics, and materials science, Wirtz's research focuses on the biophysical properties of healthy and diseased cells, including interactions between adjacent cells and the role of cellular architecture on nuclear shape and gene expression. His research interests include cell biophysics, aging, tumor microenvironment, digital pathology, the actin cap, single molecule manipulation, intracellular particle trafficking, instrument development, tissue engineering, and nanotechnology in biology and medicine. He has made important contributions to molecular and biophysical mechanisms of cell motility and adhesion and nuclear dynamics in health and disease, and he pioneered the method of particle-tracking microrheology to probe the rheological properties of complex fluids and living cells and tissues.

Wirtz currently holds several patents on his work.

2D vs. 3D cell migration

Wirtz's lab identified fundamental differences between conventional 2D migration and more physiologically relevant 3D migration in cancer cells, creating new understanding of the tumor microenvironment and metastasis. In particular, they found that the nucleus, focal adhesion molecules, the lamina, LINC complexes, and matrix metalloproteinase (MMPs) play a central role in 3D migration (migration in 3D collagen-rich matrices) that is not predicted or extrapolated from the better known 2D case (use of a Petri dish). Supporting Publications:

- 2009, B. Wildt, D. Wirtz, and P.C. Searson, Programmed sub-cellular release for studying the dynamics of cell detachment, in: Nature Methods. Vol. 6; 211–213.
- 2010, S.I. Fraley, Y. Feng, D.H. Kim, A. Celedon, G.D. Longmore, and D. Wirtz, The distinctive role of focal adhesion proteins in three-dimensional cell motility, in: Nature Cell Biology. Vol. 12; 598–604.
- 2011, D. Wirtz, K. Konstantopoulos, P.C. Searson, The physics of cancer: the role of physical interactions and mechanical forces in metastasis, in: Nature Reviews Cancer. Vol. 11; 512–522.
- 2012, S.I. Fraley, Y. Feng, A. Giri, G.D. Longmore, and D Wirtz, Dimensional and temporal controls of three-dimensional cell migration by Zyxin and binding partners, in: Nature Communications. Vol. 3; 719.
- 2013, K. Konstantopoulos, P.-H. Wu, and D. Wirtz, Dimensional control of cancer cell migration, in: Biophysical Journal. Vol. 104, nº 2; 279–280.
- 2014, D.M. Gilkes, L. Xiang, S.J. Lee, M.E. Hubbi, P. Chaturvedi, D. Wirtz, and G.L. Semenza, Hypoxia-inducible factors mediate coordinated RhoA-ROCK1 expression and signaling in breast cancer cells, in: PNAS. Vol. 111; E384-E393.
- 2014, P.H. Wu, A. Giri, S.X. Sun, D. Wirtz, Three-dimensional cell migration does not follow a random walk, in: PNAS. Vol. 111, nº 11; 3949–3954.
- 2015, P.-H. Wu, A. Giri, and D. Wirtz, Statistical analysis of cell migration in 3D using the anisotropic persistent random walk model, in: Nature Protocols. Vol. 10; 517–527.

Cell and nuclear mechanics

Wirtz developed novel tools and concepts to study the role of nucleus and nuclear connections to the cytoskeleton and key cell functions, including 2D and 3D cell migration and adhesion, mechanosensation, and mechanotransduction. In particular, he identified LINC complexes and the so-called perinuclear actin cap as key mediators of physical signaling between the cytoplasm and the nuclear interior. More recently, he discovered that the nuclear lamina of adherent cells is polarized through the actin cap, which in turn polarizes hyper-acetylated forms of histones in the nucleus. Supporting Publications:

- 2009, S.B. Khatau, C.M. Hale, P.J. Stewart-Hutchison, M.S. Patel, C.L. Stewart, P.C. Searson, D. Hodzic, and D. Wirtz, A perinuclear actin cap regulates nuclear shape, in: PNAS. Vol. 107; 19017–19022.
- 2013, D.H. Kim, A.B. Chambliss, and D. Wirtz, The multi-faceted role of the actin cap in cellular mechanosensation and mechanotransduction, in: Soft Matter. Vol. 9; 5516–5523.
- 2013, A.B. Chambliss, S.B. Khatau, P.-H. Wu, N. Erdenberger, D.K. Robinson, D. Hodzic, G.D. Longmore, and D. Wirtz, The LINC-anchored actin cap connects the extracellular milieu to the nucleus for ultrafast mechanotransduction, in: Scientific Reports. Vol. 3; 1087–1095.
- 2013, S.B. Khatau, R.J. Bloom, S. Bajpai, D. Razafsky, S. Zang, A. Giri, P.-H. Wu, J. Marchand, A. Celedon, C.M. Hale, S.X. Sun, D. Hodzic, and D. Wirtz, The distinct roles of the nucleus and nucleus-cytoskeleton connections in three-dimensional cell migration, in: Scientific Reports. Vol. 2; 488–499.
- 2014, D.H. Kim, S. Cho, and D. Wirtz, Tight coupling between nucleus and cell migration through the perinuclear actin cap, in: Journal of Cell Science. Vol. 127; 2528–2541.
- 2014, D. Razafsky, D. Wirtz, and D. Hodzic, Nuclear envelope in nuclear positioning and cell migration, in: Advances in Experimental Medicine and Biology. Vol. 773; 471–490.
- 2015, D.H. Kim and D. Wirtz, Cytoskeletal tension induces the 3D polarized architecture of the nucleus, in: Biomaterials. Vol. 48; 161–172.

Single-molecule adhesion nanomechanics

Using single-molecule force spectroscopy, his lab showed how intracellular molecules such as a-catenin and b-catenin modulate cell-cell adhesion mediated by E-cadherin. Supporting Publications:

- 2008, S. Bajpai, J. Correia, Y. Feng, J. Figueiredo, S.X. Sun, G.D. Longmore, G. Suriano, and D. Wirtz, a-catenin mediates initial E-cadherin-dependent cell-cell recognition and subsequent bond strengthening, in: PNAS. Vol. 105; 18331–18336.
- 2009, S. Bajpai, Y. Feng, R. Krishnamurthy, G.D. Longmore, and D. Wirtz, Loss of a-catenin decreases the strength of single E-cadherin bonds between human cancer cells, in: Journal of Biological Chemistry. Vol. 284; 18252–18259.
- 2011, P.S. Raman, C.S. Alves, D. Wirtz, K. Konstantopoulos, Single molecule binding of CD44 to fibrin versus P-selectin predicts their distinct shear-dependent interactions in cancer, in: Journal of Cell Science. Vol. 124; 1904–1910.
- 2013, S. Bajpai, Y. Feng, D. Wirtz, and G.D. Longmore, a-catenin serves as a clutch between low and high intercellular E-cadherin bond strengths, in: Biophysical Journal. Vol. 105; 2289–2300.

== Publications ==
Wirtz has published nearly 200 peer-reviewed articles published in Science, Nature, Nature Cell Biology, Nature Methods, Nature Reviews Cancer, Nature Materials, Nature Protocols, PNAS, Nature Communications, and Journal of Cell Biology. He has an h-index of 83.

Highly cited articles

- 2011, The physics of cancer: the role of physical interactions and mechanical forces in metastasis, in: Nature Reviews Cancer. Vol. 11, nº 7; 512–522.
- 2010, A distinctive role for focal adhesion proteins in three-dimensional cell motility, in: Nature Cell Biology. Vol. 12, nº 6; 598–604.
- 2009, Particle-tracking microrheology of living cells: principles and applications, in: Annual Review of Biophysics. Vol 38; 301–326.
- 2003, Efficient active transport of gene nanocarriers to the cell nucleus, in: PNAS. Vol. 100, nº 7; 3878–3882.
- 2002, Micromechanical mapping of live cells by multiple-particle-tracking microrheology, in: Biophysical Journal. Vol. 83, nº 6; 3162–3176.
- 2000, Mechanics of living cells measured by laser tracking microrheology, in: Biophysical Journal. Vol. 78, nº 4; 1736–1747.
- 1998, Reversible hydrogels from self-assembling artificial proteins, in: Science. Vol. 281, nº 5375; 389–392.
- 1997, Particle tracking microrheology of complex fluids, in: Physical Review Letters. Vol. 79, nº 17; 3282.

== See also ==
- Bloomberg Distinguished Professorships
- Johns Hopkins University
- Ronald J. Daniels
- National Cancer Institute
- Physical Sciences-Oncology Centers
- Cell CANARY
- Belgian American Educational Foundation
