= Cell CANARY =

Technology to identify pathogens

Cell CANARY (Cellular Analysis and Notification of Antigen Risks and Yields) is a recent technology that uses genetically engineered B cells to identify pathogens. Existing pathogen detection technologies include the Integrated Biological Detection System and the Joint Chemical Agent Detector.

== History ==
In 2007, Benjamin Shapiro, Pamela Abshire, Elisabeth Smela, and Denis Wirtz were granted a patent entitled “Cell Canaries for Biochemical Pathogen Detection. They have successfully manipulated the sensors so that they are sensitive to exposure of certain dangers, such as explosive materials or biological pathogens. What sets CANARY apart from the other methods is that the system is quicker and has a lower number of false readings. Existing pathogen detection methods required that a sample be packaged and sent to a lab where techniques such as mass spectrometry and Polymerase Chain Reaction ultimately provided a blueprint of the nucleotide sequences present in a sample. The pathogen was then determined based on a database of pathogen nucleotides on file. This often resulted in a large amount of false positives and false negatives due to the non-specific nature of nucleotide binding. These techniques also required time that is not feasible in imminent situations.

== Method ==
Cell CANARY is one of the newest, fastest, and most viable approaches to pathogen detection in a sample. It has the ability to detect pathogens in a variety of media, both liquid and air, at a fraction of the concentration that older methods required to produce a viable signal. CANARY uses the B cell, a form of white blood cell that forms the basis for natural human defense. An array of these b-cells is attached to a chip. Genes for producing antibodies are naturally on in these b-cells, which allow antibodies to coat the exterior surface of the cells. The genes for coding antibodies are then up-regulated in these cells, which allows for greater antibody production and therefore more of the cell surface to be coated in antibodies.

This engineering principle allows lower concentrations of antigen to be detected by the cells. Antigens can then bind to the antibodies, resulting in a few naturally occurring B-cell reactions. At the final step of these reactions, Ca2+ ions are released, and in the presence of aequorin, photons are emitted. Aequorin is a photoprotein that can be extracted from marine organisms such as luminescent fish. The emitted photons can then be read by a chip, on which the array of modified B cells have been attached to, ultimately providing a readout of the pathogen(s) present.

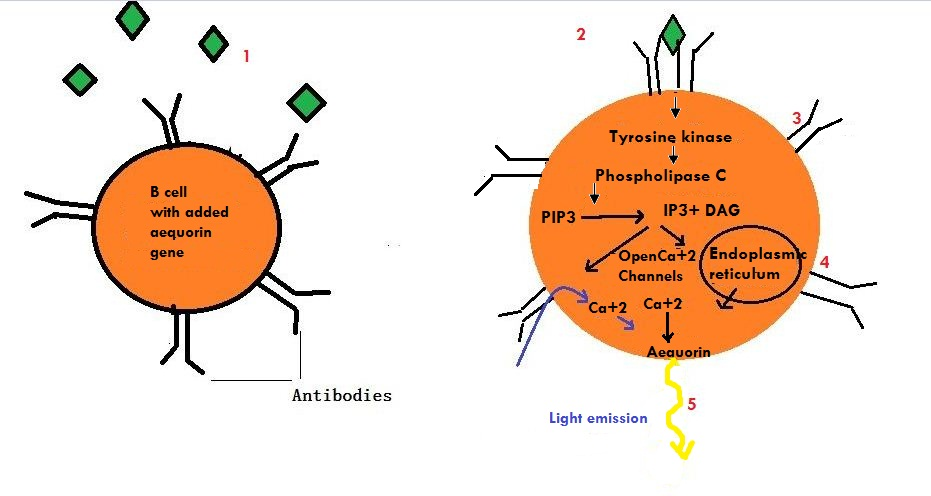
Step1: B cells are exposed around by antigens. Step2: antigens are attached with antibodies. Step3: tyrosine kinase leads to IP3 and DAG, Ca2+ is released. Step4: Ca2+ channel is opened and aequorin emits photons. Step 5, photons are detected.

A unique set of responses is exhibited after exposure to each individual pathogen. Therefore, cells will react differently to the introduction of a specific pathogen, the specific nature in which the “canary” cells respond to the pathogen indicates the unique identity of the pathogen that has been introduced. The more responses of a cell to a pathogen that are measured the more precisely the pathogen can be identified. Finally, after determining the presence and identity of the pathogen, all infected people can be effectively treated.

== Application ==
There still need improvements on specific aspects of this complicated process. Some of the challenges include "building circuits that can interact with the cells and transmit alerts about their condition", developing technology to control the position of the cells on the chip, keeping the cells viable once on the chip and creating a living environment that supports the cells but protects the sensitive parts of the sensor. The implications of a faster pathogen detection technology are widespread. A patient would be able to visit a medical professional, provide a sample of blood or urine, and get an analysis within minutes. No longer would the patient and doctor have to wait on lab results to determine the presence of foreign bodies. The military would be able to test air samples and water samples to discover threats immediately before dispatching. High profile and even regular office buildings could have these sensors in every corridor to proactively hunt out air-borne pathogens, leaving enough time for evacuation. This goes back to the idea of “canary in a coal mine”, where the B cells act as the canary to sniff out danger ahead of time.
