= Physical Sciences in Oncology Network =

Network of centers and projects set up by the NIH and the NCI

The Physical Sciences in Oncology Network (PS-ON) is a network of centers and projects set up by the National Institutes of Health (NIH) and the National Cancer Institute (NCI) to link the physical sciences with the study of cancer. The program was launched in 2009 with Physical Sciences in Oncology Centers (PS-OCs) investigating complex and challenging questions in cancer research from a physical sciences perspective. To explore how the NCI could continue to support the integration of physical sciences and cancer research, a Think Tank and series of Strategic Workshops were held in 2012. These meetings served to update opportunities at the interface of physical sciences and cancer research and guided the development of the second phase including Physical Sciences in Oncology Projects (PS-OPs).

== Centers (PS-OCs) ==
- Arizona State University. Principal Investigator: Paul Davies, Scientific Investigator: William M. Grady.
- Dana–Farber Cancer Institute. Principal Investigator: Franziska Michor, Scientific Investigator: Eric C. Holland.
- Johns Hopkins University. Principal Investigator: Denis Wirtz, Scientific Investigator: Gregg L. Semenza.
- The Methodist Hospital Research Institute, Principal Investigator: Mauro Ferrari, Scientific Investigator: Steven A. Curley.
- Princeton University. Principal Investigator: Robert H. Austin, Scientific Investigator: Thea D. Tlsty.
- Stanford University Principal Investigator: Jan Liphardt, Scientific Investigator: Valerie M. Weaver.
- Cornell University Principal Investigator: Michael L. Shuler, Scientific Investigator: Barbara L. Hempstead.
- H. Lee Moffitt Cancer Center & Research Institute Principal Investigator: Robert A. Gatenby, Scientific Investigator: Robert J. Gillies.
- Massachusetts Institute of Technology. Principal Investigator: Scott Manalis, Scientific Investigator: Tyler Jacks.
- Northwestern University Principal Investigator: Thomas V. O'Halloran, Scientific Investigator: Jonathan D. Licht.
- The Scripps Research Institute Principal Investigator: Peter Kuhn, Scientific Investigator: Kelly J. Bethel.
- University of Southern California Principal Investigator: W. Daniel Hillis, Scientific Investigator: David Agus.

== Projects (PS-OPs) ==
- City of Hope project on Information Flow and State Transitions at the System and Multi-Dimensional Scales in Leukemia Progression. Principal Investigators: Russell C. Rockne, Ya-Huei Kuo, and Guido Marcucci.
- Georgia Institute of Technology project on Exploiting the Mechanobiology of PD-1 for Cancer Immunotherapy. Principal Investigator: Cheng Zhu and Rafi Ahmed.
- Georgia Institute of Technology project on Mechanisms of Impaired T-Cell Mechanosensing of Melanoma Antigens. Principal Investigators: Cheng Zhu and Michelle Krogsgaard.
- Harvard University project on Epithelial Layer Jamming in Breast Cancer Cell Migration. Principal Investigator: Jeffrey Fredberg.
- Houston Methodist Research Institute project on Biophysical Roles of Pre-Metastatic Niche Evolution on Transport of Circulating Tumor Cells. Principal Investigators: Kenji Yokoi, Milos Kojic, and Lidong Qin.
- Institute for Systems Biology project on Steady States and Cellular Transitions Associated with Carcinogenesis and Tumor Progression. Principal Investigators: James R. Heath and Wei Wei (scientist).
- Mayo Clinic project on Image-Based Models of Tumor-Immune Dynamics in Gliobastoma. Principal Investigators: Kristin R. Swanson, Peter Canoll, and Leland Hu.
- Massachusetts General Hospital project on Metastasis and Biophysics of Clusters of Circulating Tumor Cells in the Microcirculation. Principal Investigators: Mehmet Toner, Daniel A. Haber, and Shyamala Maheswaran.
- Massachusetts Institute of Technology project on Quantitative Analysis of Tumor Cell Extravasation. Principal Investigator: Roger Kamm.
- Moffitt Cancer Center project on Defining Bone Ecosystem Effects on Metastatic Prostate Cancer Evolution and Treatment Response Using an Integrated Mathematical Modeling Approach. Principal Investigators: Conor C. Lynch and David Basanta Gutierrez.
- Moffitt Cancer Center project on Predicting Radiation-Induced Shifts in Patient-Specific Immune Ecosystem Composition to Harness Immunological Consequences of Radiotherapy. Principal Investigators: Heiko Enderling and Shari Pilon-Thomas.
- Texas A&M University project on Nuclear Dysfunction in Cancer: The Role of Mechanical Stresses Transmitted by the LINC Complex. Principal Investigator: Tanmay P. Lele.
- Wake Forest University project on Chromatin Mobility in Response to DNA Damage. Principal Investigators: Pierre Vidi and Keith D. Bonin.
- University of California at Berkeley project on ECM Geometrical and Mechanical Properties Modulate RTK Signaling. Principal Investigators: Jay T. Groves and Valerie M. Weaver.
- University of California at San Francisco project on Understanding Breast Cancer Progression as a Defect in the Mechanics of Tissue Self-Organization. Principal Investigators: Zev J. Gartner, Andrei Goga, Mark A. Labarge, and Matt Thomson.
- University of Michigan project on Environmental Regulation of Cancer Stem Cell Plasticity in Metastasis. Principal Investigators: Gary D. Luker and Joergg Lahan.
- University of Utah project on Multi-Tensor Decompositions for Personalized Cancer Diagnostics and Prognostics. Principal Investigator: Orly Alter.
- Vanderbilt University project on Physical Dynamics of Cancer Response to Chemotherapy in 3D Microenvironments. Principal Investigators: Lisa J. McCawley, Dmitry Markov (scientist), and Katarzyna A. Rejniak.
