= All European Academies =

Sciences and humanities federation

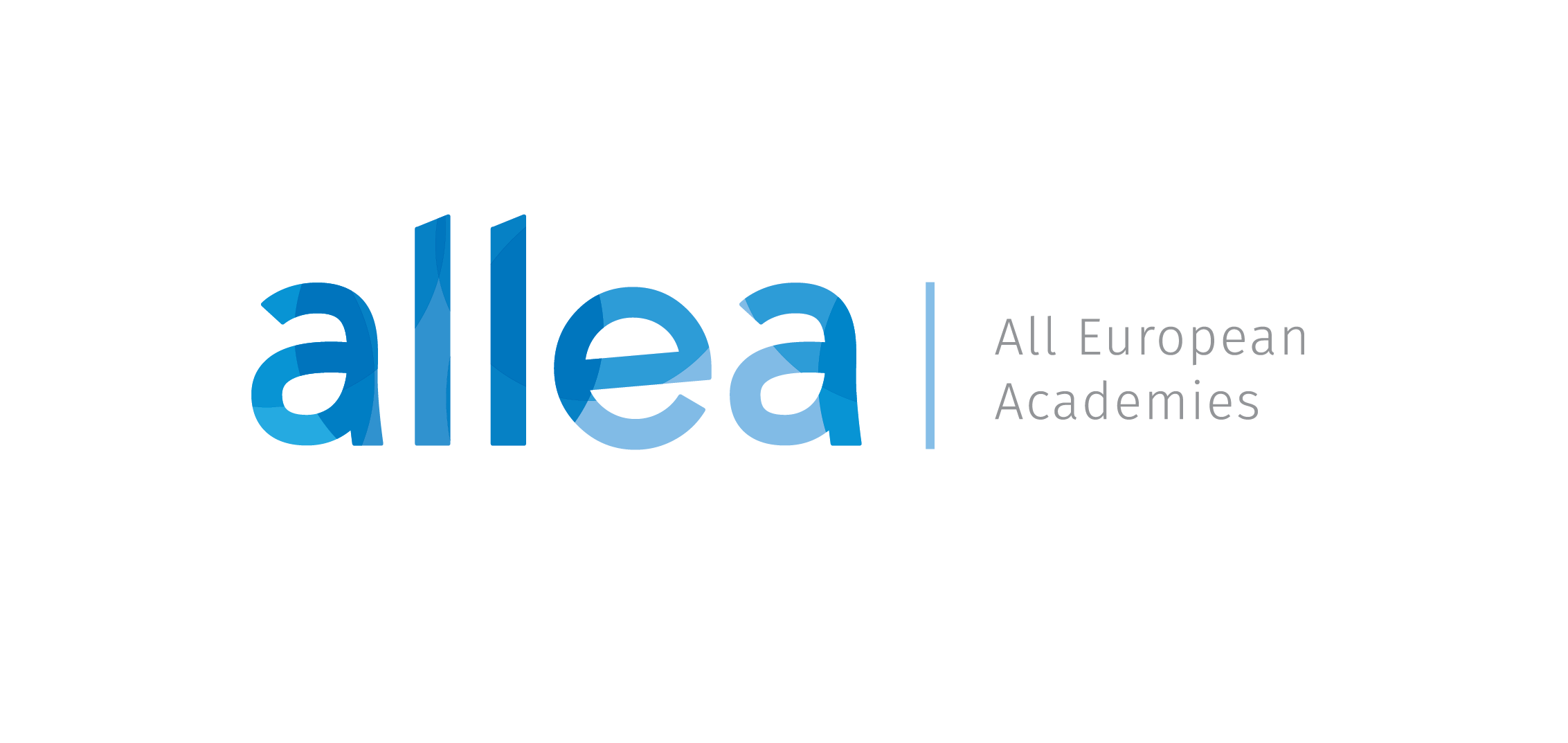
- ALLEA, the European Federation of Academies of Sciences and Humanities

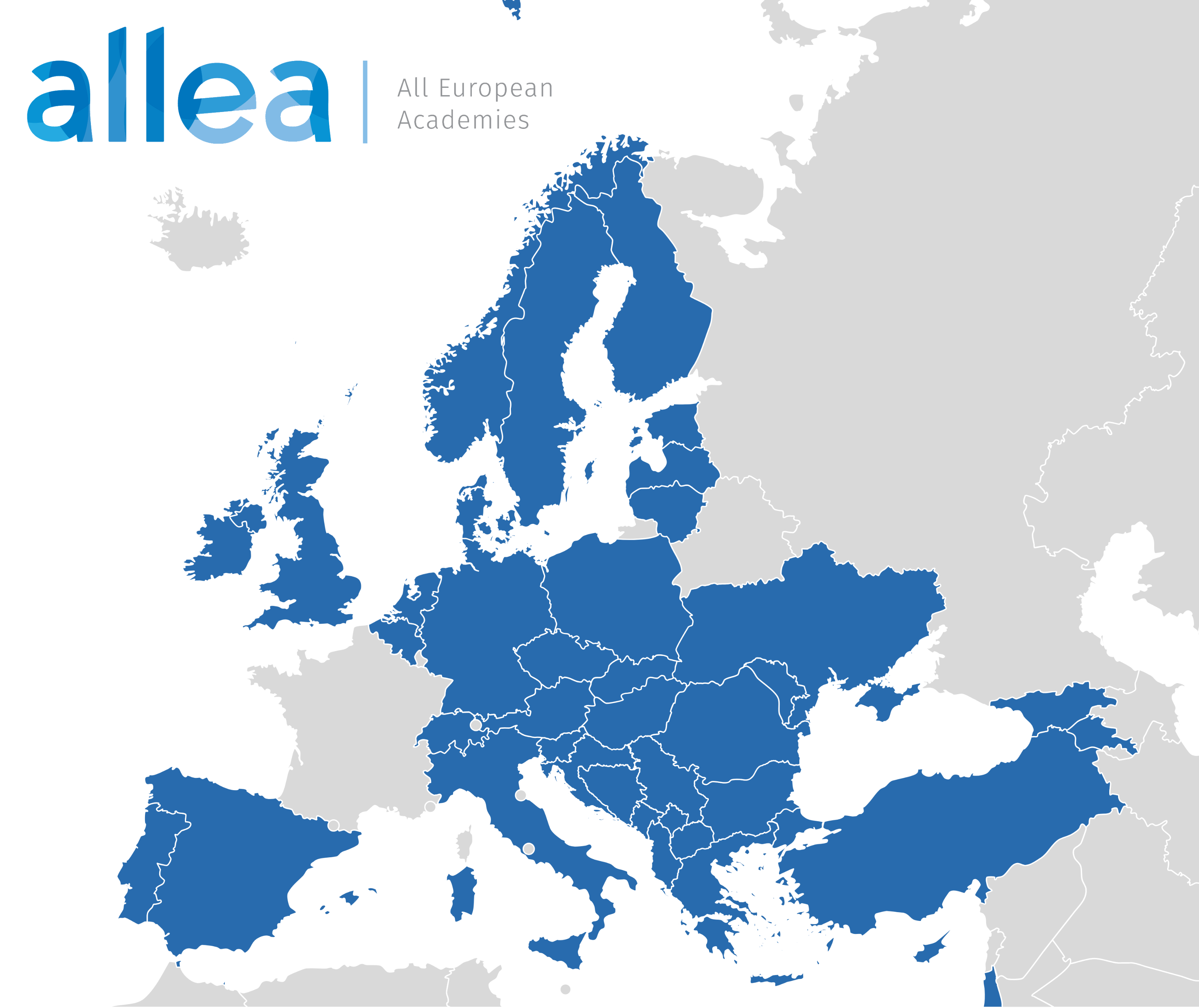
- Formation: 1994; 32 years ago
- Headquarters: Berlin, Germany
- President: Paweł Rowiński
- Vice Presidents: Marie-Louise Nosch; Annette Grüters-Kieslich
- Board of directors: Jūras Banys; Ylva Engström; Lara Keuck; Jozef Ongena; Päivi Pahta; Karin Roelofs; Neri Salvadori; Camilla Serck-Hanssen
- Website: allea.org

All European Academies (ALLEA) is the European Federation of Academies of Sciences and Humanities. It was founded in 1994, and brings together 60 Academies of Sciences and Learned Societies from over 40 member countries of the Council of Europe. Since June 2024, the President of ALLEA is Paweł Rowiński. ALLEA is financed by annual dues from its member academies and remains fully independent from political, religious, commercial or ideological interests. The ALLEA secretariat is based on the premises of the Berlin-Brandenburg Academy of Sciences and Humanities in Berlin.

== Member academies ==
The organization comprises academies from the European Union (EU) and non–EU member states in Europe, in the humanities, social sciences, and natural and life sciences:

- Academy of Sciences of Albania
- Armenian Academy of Sciences
- Austrian Academy of Sciences
- National Academy of Sciences of Belarus
- Royal Academy of Sciences, Letters and Arts of Belgium
- Académie royale de langue et de littérature françaises de Belgique
- Royal Academy of Dutch Language and Literature
- Royal Flemish Academy of Belgium for Science and the Arts
- Academy of Sciences and Arts of Bosnia and Herzegovina
- Bulgarian Academy of Sciences
- European Academy of Sciences
- Croatian Academy of Sciences and Arts
- Czech Academy of Sciences
- Learned Society of the Czech Republic
- Royal Danish Academy of Sciences and Letters
- Estonian Academy of Sciences
- Council of Finnish Academies
- Young Academy Finland
- Georgian National Academy of Sciences
- German National Academy of Sciences Leopoldina
- Union of the German Academies of Sciences and Humanities
- Academy of Athens
- Hungarian Academy of Sciences
- Royal Irish Academy
- Israel Academy of Sciences and Humanities
- Accademia Nazionale dei Lincei
- Istituto Veneto di Scienze, Lettere ed Arti
- Accademia delle Scienze di Torino
- Academy of Sciences and Arts of Kosovo
- Latvian Academy of Sciences
- Lithuanian Academy of Sciences
- Academy of Sciences of Moldova
- Montenegrin Academy of Sciences and Arts
- Royal Netherlands Academy of Arts and Sciences
- Academy of Sciences and Arts of the Republic of North Macedonia
- Norwegian Academy of Science and Letters
- Royal Norwegian Society of Sciences and Letters
- Polish Academy of Sciences
- Polish Academy of Arts and Sciences
- Academy of Sciences of Lisbon
- Romanian Academy
- Serbian Academy of Sciences and Arts
- Slovak Academy of Sciences
- Slovenian Academy of Sciences and Arts
- Spanish Royal Academy of Sciences
- Royal Academy of Sciences and Arts of Barcelona
- Institute of Catalan Studies
- Royal Swedish Academy of Letters, History and Antiquities
- Royal Swedish Academy of Sciences
- Swiss Academies of Arts and Sciences
- Turkish Academy of Sciences
- The Science Academy Society of Turkey
- National Academy of Sciences of Ukraine
- The British Academy
- Learned Society of Wales
- The Royal Society
- The Royal Society of Edinburgh
- Cyprus Academy of Sciences, Letters and Arts

== Working Groups ==
ALLEA working groups advise on matters related to science, science management and science policy on the European level.

== SAPEA ==
ALLEA, jointly with four other European academy networks, forms part of the EU-funded SAPEA (Science Advice for Policy by European Academies) project, with fellows from over 100 Academies across Europe. SAPEA advises on policy issues to the European Commission and the European public in the context of the European Commission's Scientific Advice Mechanism.
