= Koninklijke Vlaamse Academie =

Koninklijke Vlaamse Academie may refer to:

- Koninklijke Vlaamse Academie van België voor Wetenschappen en Kunsten
- Koninklijke Vlaamse Academie voor Taal- en Letterkunde
