= Royal Academy for Overseas Sciences =

Belgian enterprise

The Royal Academy for Overseas Sciences (RAOS; French: Académie royale des sciences d'outre-mer, ARSOM; Dutch: Koninklijke Academie voor Overzeese Wetenschappen, KAOW) is a Belgian federal academy that contributes to the progress of scientific knowledge about overseas regions. It is located in Uccle, Brussels, and is one of Belgium's numerous academies.

== History ==
The academy was founded in 1928 as the Royal Belgian Colonial Institute (Institut royal colonial belge). It was renamed in 1954 as the Royal Academy of Colonial Sciences (Académie royale des sciences coloniales). Its interests were initially restricted to the Belgian colonial empire and particularly the Belgian Congo until decolonisation. In 1959, it was renamed the Royal Academy of Overseas Sciences (Académie royale des sciences d'outre-mer) and broadened its geographical remit to include Sub-Saharan Africa, Latin America, Asia, and Oceania. The academy organises a wide range of activities, including publications, academic conferences, and annual competitions.

The Royal Academy for Overseas Sciences is divided into three Sections:

- Section of Human Sciences
- Section of Natural and Medical Sciences
- Section of Technical Sciences

== Competitions, scholarships and prizes ==
The Academy organizes yearly competitions with specific topics for each of its three Sections. Scholarships are also granted every year as part of the Floribert Jurion Fund, which aim is to contribute to the training of future agricultural engineers or veterinary surgeons by giving them the opportunity to go for a training period in a developing country.

Finally the Academy awards the following three-year prizes:

- The Lucien Cahen Prize for Geology (2012).
- The Yola Verhasselt Prize for Tropical Geography (2013).
- The Fernand Suykens Prize for the study of ports (2013).
- The Jean-Jacques and Berthe Symoens Prize for Tropical Limnology (2014).

== Publications ==
Works produced by the society include:

- Atlas général du Congo / Algemene atlas van Congo (in French and Dutch), 1948–1963
- Biographie Belge d'Outre-Mer, 1948-2015; 11 volumes (Also called Biographie Coloniale Belge)
- Bulletin des Seances. 1930- (online)
- Commission d'Histoire du Congo. (Publications.) 1953-1958.
- Livre blanc: Apport scientifique de la Belgique au developpement de l'Afrique centrale. 1962-
- Memoires (online)
  - Memoires de la classe des sciences morales et politiques. 1933-
  - Memoires de la classe des sciences naturelles et medicales. 1931-
  - Memoires de la classe des sciences techniques. 1930-

== See also ==
- Belgian overseas colonies
- Société Belge d'Études Coloniales (est. 1894)
- Colonial University of Belgium (est. 1920 in Antwerp)
