= Bioreporter =

Genetically engineered microbial cells

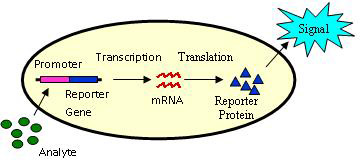
Anatomy of a bioreporter organism. Upon exposure to a specific analyte, the promoter/reporter gene complex is transcribed into messenger RNA (mRNA) and then translated into a reporter protein that is ultimately responsible for generating a signal.

Bioreporters are intact, living microbial cells that have been genetically engineered to produce a measurable signal in response to a specific chemical or physical agent in their environment. Bioreporters contain two essential genetic elements, a promoter gene and a reporter gene. The promoter gene is turned on (transcribed) when the target agent is present in the cell’s environment. The promoter gene in a normal bacterial cell is linked to other genes that are then likewise transcribed and then translated into proteins that help the cell in either combating or adapting to the agent to which it has been exposed. In the case of a bioreporter, these genes, or portions thereof, have been removed and replaced with a reporter gene. As a result, turning on the promoter gene also turns on the reporter gene, leading to the production of reporter proteins that output a detectable signal. The presence of a signal indicates that the bioreporter has sensed a particular agent in its environment.

Originally developed for fundamental analysis of factors affecting gene expression, bioreporters were early on applied for the detection of environmental contaminants and have since evolved into fields as diverse as medical diagnostics, precision agriculture, food safety assurance, process monitoring and control, and bio-microelectronic computing. Their versatility stems from the fact that there exists a large number of reporter gene systems that are capable of generating a variety of signals. Additionally, reporter genes can be genetically inserted into bacterial, yeast, plant, and mammalian cells, thereby providing considerable functionality over a wide range of host vectors.

== Reporter gene systems ==
Several types of reporter genes are available for use in the construction of bioreporter organisms, and the signals they generate can usually be categorized as either colorimetric, fluorescent, luminescent, chemiluminescent or electrochemical. Although each functions differently, their end product always remains the same – a measurable signal that is proportional to the concentration of the unique chemical or physical agent to which they have been exposed. In some instances, the signal only occurs when a secondary substrate is added to the bioassay (luxAB, Luc, and aequorin). For other bioreporters, the signal must be activated by an external light source (GFP and UMT), and for a select few bioreporters, the signal is completely self-induced, with no exogenous substrate or external activation being required (luxCDABE). The following sections outline in brief some of the reporter gene systems available and their existing applications.

=== Bacterial luciferase (Lux) ===
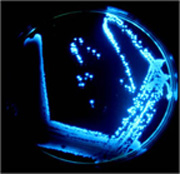
Bioluminescence emitted from colonies of microbial cells containing the genes for bacterial luciferase.

Luciferase is a generic name for an enzyme that catalyzes a light-emitting reaction. Luciferases can be found in bacteria, algae, fungi, jellyfish, insects, shrimp, and squid, and the resulting light that these organisms produce is termed bioluminescence. In bacteria, the genes responsible for the light-emitting reaction (the lux genes) have been isolated and used extensively in the construction of bioreporters that emit a blue-green light with a maximum intensity at 490 nm. Three variants of lux are available, one that functions at < 30°C, another at < 37°C, and a third at < 45°C. The lux genetic system consists of five genes, luxA, luxB, luxC, luxD, and luxE. Depending on the combination of these genes used, several different types of bioluminescent bioreporters can be constructed.

=== luxAB Bioreporters ===
luxAB bioreporters contain only the luxA and luxB genes, which together are responsible for generating the light signal. However, to fully complete the light-emitting reaction, a substrate must be supplied to the cell. Typically, this occurs through the addition of the chemical decanal at some point during the bioassay procedure. Numerous luxAB bioreporters have been constructed within bacterial, yeast, insect, nematode, plant, and mammalian cell systems.

=== luxCDABE Bioreporters ===
Instead of containing only the luxA and luxB genes, bioreporters can contain all five genes of the lux cassette, thereby allowing for a completely independent light generating system that requires no extraneous additions of substrate nor any excitation by an external light source. So in this bioassay, the bioreporter is simply exposed to a target analyte and a quantitative increase in bioluminescence results, often within less than one hour. Due to their rapidity and ease of use, along with the ability to perform the bioassay repetitively in real time and on-line, makes luxCDABE bioreporters extremely attractive. Consequently, they have been incorporated into a diverse array of detection methodologies ranging from the sensing of environmental contaminants to the real-time monitoring of pathogen infections in living mice.

=== Nonspecific lux Bioreporters ===
Nonspecific lux bioreporters are typically used for the detection of chemical toxins. They are usually designed to continuously bioluminesce. Upon exposure to a chemical toxin, either the cell dies or its metabolic activity is retarded, leading to a decrease in bioluminescent light levels. Their most familiar application is in the Microtox assay where, following a short exposure to several concentrations of the sample, the decreased bioluminescence can be correlated to relative levels of toxicity.

=== Firefly luciferase (Luc) ===
Firefly luciferase catalyzes a reaction that produces visible light in the 550 to 575 nm range. A click-beetle luciferase is also available that produces light at a peak closer to 595 nm. Both luciferases require the addition of an exogenous substrate (luciferin) for the light reaction to occur. Numerous luc-based bioreporters have been constructed for the detection of a wide array of inorganic and organic compounds of environmental concern. The most promising applications, however, probably rely on introducing the genetic code of the firefly luciferase into other eukaryotic cells and tissues.

==== Medical diagnostics ====
Insertion of the luc genes into a human cervical carcinoma cell line (HeLa) illustrated that tumor-cell clearance could be visualized within a living mouse by simply scanning with a charge-coupled device camera, allowing for chemotherapy treatment to rapidly be monitored on-line and in real-time. In another example, the luc genes were inserted into human breast cancer cell lines to develop a bioassay for the detection and measurement of substances with potential estrogenic and antiestrogenic activity.

==== Research on gene regulation ====
Particular promoters can be placed upstream of the luc gene, that is, the luc sequence can be fused to the promoter sequence at DNA level. If such a construct is not too large in size, it can simply be introduced into eukaryotic cells using plasmids. This approach is widely used to study the activity of a given promoter in a given cell/tissue type, since the amount of light produced by the luciferase is directly proportional to the promoter activity. In addition to studying the promoters, firefly luciferase assays offer the option of studying transcriptional activators: in these experiments typically the GAL4/UAS_system is used and its Gal4 upstream activating DNA sequence (UAS) is placed upstream the luc gene while the different activators or the different variants/fragments of the same activator are fused to the GAL4 DNA binding module at protein level. This way the transcriptional activity of the different GAL4 fusion proteins can be directly compared using light as a readout.

=== Aequorin ===
Aequorin is a photoprotein isolated from the bioluminescent jellyfish Aequorea victoria. Upon addition of calcium ions (Ca2+) and coelenterazine, a reaction occurs whose result is the generation of blue light in the 460 to 470 nm range. Aequorin has been incorporated into human B cell lines for the detection of pathogenic bacteria and viruses in what is referred to as the Cell CANARY assay (Cellular Analysis and Notification of Antigen Risks and Yields). The B cells are genetically engineered to produce aequorin. Upon exposure to antigens of different pathogens, the recombinant B cells emit light as a result of activation of an intracellular signaling cascade that releases calcium ions inside the cell.

=== Green fluorescent protein (GFP) ===
Green fluorescent protein (GFP) is also a photoprotein isolated and cloned from the jellyfish Aequorea victoria. Variants have also been isolated from the sea pansy Renilla reniformis. GFP, like aequorin, produces a blue fluorescent signal, but without the required addition of an exogenous substrate. All that is required is an ultraviolet light source to activate the fluorescent properties of the photoprotein. This ability to autofluoresce makes GFP highly desirable in biosensing assays since it can be used on-line and in to monitor intact, living cells. Additionally, the ability to alter GFP to produce light emissions besides blue (i.e., cyan, red, and yellow) allows it to be used as a multianalyte detector. Consequently, GFP has been used extensively in bioreporter constructs within bacterial, yeast, nematode, plant, and mammalian hosts.

=== Uroporphyrinogen (urogen) III methyltransferase (UMT) ===
Uroporphyrinogen (urogen) III methyltransferase (UMT) catalyzes a reaction that yields two fluorescent products which produce a red-orange fluorescence in the 590 to 770 nm range when illuminated with ultraviolet light. So as with GFP, no addition of exogenous substrates is required. UMT has been used as a bioreporter for the selection of recombinant plasmids, as a marker for gene transcription in bacterial, yeast, and mammalian cells, and for the detection of toxic salts such as arsenite and antimonite.
