= Pamela Abshire =

American engineer

- Born: Fayetteville, North Carolina, USA

Academic background
- Education: BS, 1992, California Institute of Technology; MS, Electrical and Computer Engineering, 1997, PhD, Electrical and Computer Engineering, 2001, Johns Hopkins University

Academic work
- Institutions: University of Maryland, College Park

Pamela A. Abshire is an American engineer. She was elected a Fellow of the Institute of Electrical and Electronics Engineers in 2018 for her contributions to CMOS biosensors.

== Early life and education ==
Abshire was born in Fayetteville, North Carolina and raised in Roanoke, Virginia, where she attended the Roanoke Valley Governor's School for Science and Technology from 1985 to 1988. Following this, she received her Bachelor of Science degree in physics from the California Institute of Technology and became a Research Engineer in the Bradycardia Research Department of Medtronic, Inc. In 1995, she enrolled at Johns Hopkins University for her Master's degree in Electrical and Computer Engineering and her Ph.D. degree in Electrical and Computer Engineering.

== Career ==
Upon completing her formal education, Abshire accepted a faculty appointment at the University of Maryland, College Park (UMD) in November 2001. Early in her career at UMD, she received the 2003 National Science Foundation (NSF) Faculty Early Career Development (CAREER) Award. As an assistant professor, Abshire, Benjamin Shapiro, and Elisabeth Smela received the 2005 Invention of the Year award for their invention, "Cell Sensor Based Pathogen Detection." Later, she began working on sensors that take advantage of the sensory capabilities of biological cells.

In 2009, Abshire, Smela, and Sarah Bergbreiter won a three-year, $1.5 million NSF grant for Ant-Like Microrobots—Fast, Small, and Under Control. Two years later, she was the co-recipient of the Jimmy H. C. Lin Award for Entrepreneurship along with Marc Dandin and David Sander, "in recognition of their business plan Ibis Microtech, a new entrepreneurial venture aiming to equip medical professionals, food quality control technicians, first responders, and national defense agencies with cost-effective diagnostics devices capable of performing laboratory-grade analyses on-site, and in record time."

During her tenure at UMD, Abshire has focused her research on CMOS biosensors; adaptive integrated circuits (ICs) and IC sensors; hybrid microsystems incorporating CMOS, MEMS, optoelectronics, microfluidics, and biological components; low power mixed-signal ICs for a variety of applications, including cell-based sensing, high performance imaging, miniature robotics, spike sorting, adaptive data conversion, and closed loop control of MEMS and microfluidic systems. In 2017, Abshire was promoted to the rank of Full Professor in the A. James Clark School of Engineering's Electrical and Computer Engineering Department. She was elected a Fellow of the Institute of Electrical and Electronics Engineers (IEEE) in 2018 for her "contributions to CMOS biosensors." During the COVID-19 pandemic, Abshire received funding for her project "Tackling Chronic Pain: Machine Learning-Enabled Biomarker Discovery and Sensing" with Reza Ghodssi and Behtash Babadi. She was later named one of the University of Maryland's 2020-2021 ADVANCE Professors, who "serve as strategic mentors and knowledge brokers for faculty within their college."

== Personal life ==
Abshire is a mother.
