= Paweł Rowiński =

Polish hydrogeologist

Paweł Mariusz Rowiński
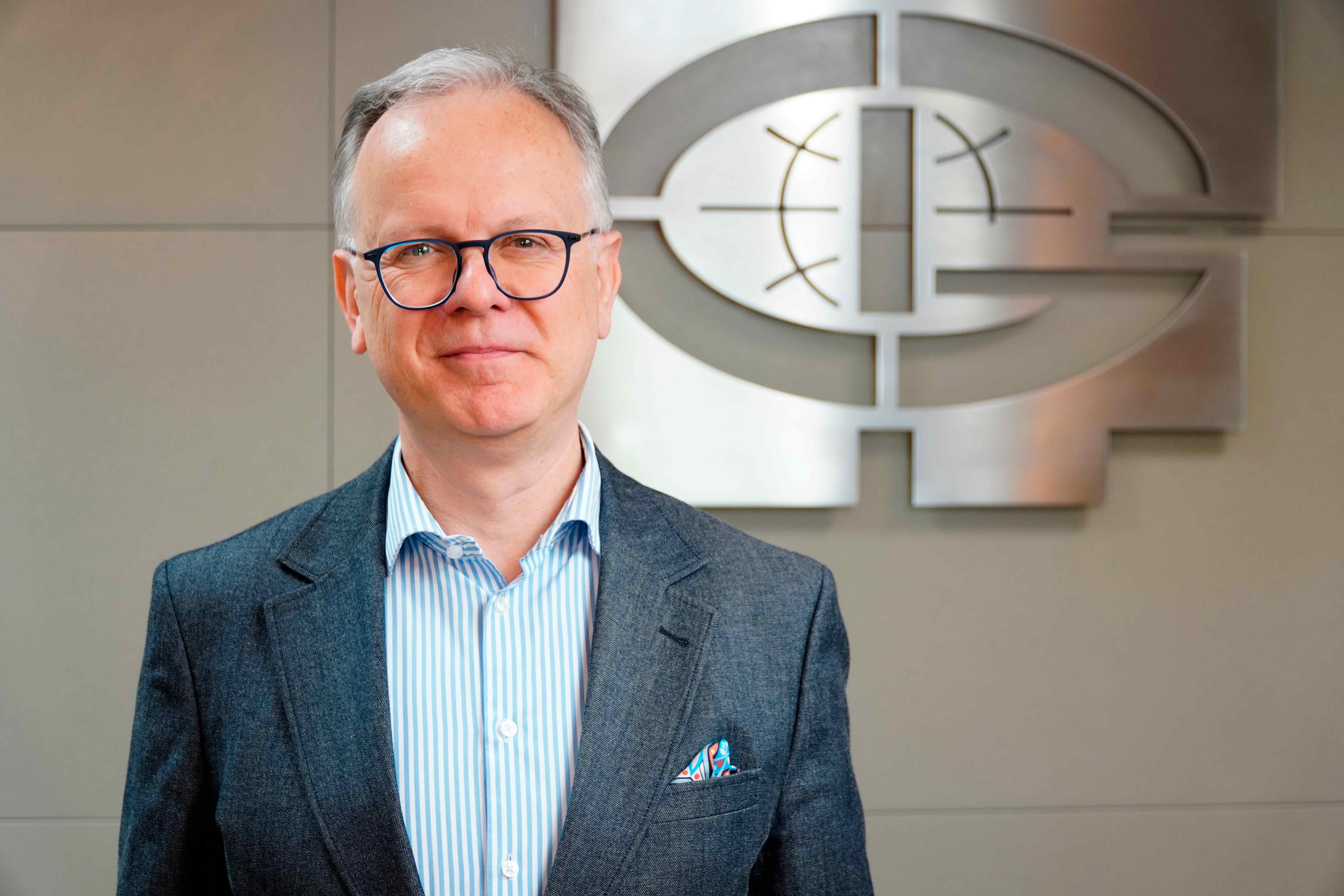
- Pawel Rowinski in 2026
- Born: February 26, 1965 (age 61); Warsaw, Poland
- Education: Uniwersytet Warszawski

Paweł Mariusz Rowiński (born 26 February 1965 in Warsaw) is a Polish hydrologist, hydrodynamicist, and geophysicist. He is a full professor at the Institute of Geophysics, Polish Academy of Sciences, a full member of the Polish Academy of Sciences, and served as Vice-President of the Polish Academy of Sciences from 2015 to 2018 and from 2019 to 2022. Since 2024, he has served as President of All European Academies (ALLEA). He served as Director of the Institute of Geophysics PAS from 2008 to 2015 and was reappointed to this position in 2023.

He specialises in environmental hydrodynamics, river hydraulics, hydrology, and mathematical modelling of processes occurring in aquatic environments. His research focuses on turbulent transport of mass and energy in rivers, pollutant mixing processes, river physics, and applications of statistical methods and artificial intelligence in Earth sciences. He also conducts research on climate change, water security, and sustainable management of water resources.

== Education and professional activity ==
In 1988, he graduated from the Faculty of Mathematics, Informatics and Mechanics of the University of Warsaw. In 1995, he received his PhD degree based on the dissertation entitled Transport cząstek stałych w turbulentnym przepływie wody (Transport of solid particles in turbulent water flow), supervised by Prof. Włodzimierz Czernuszenko. In 2003, based on the dissertation Burzliwy transport masy w jednokierunkowych przepływach rzecznych na obszarach nizinnych (Turbulent mass transport in unidirectional river flows in lowland areas), he obtained his habilitation (DSc) degree. Both his doctoral and habilitation dissertations were awarded the Prize of the Prime Minister of Poland. In 2009, he was awarded the title of professor of Earth sciences. In 2010, he was elected a corresponding member of the Polish Academy of Sciences, and since 2022 he has been a full member of the PAS.

Since 1988, he has been affiliated with the Institute of Geophysics, Polish Academy of Sciences, where he has progressed through all stages of an academic career – from assistant to professor. From 2004 to 2008, he served as Deputy Director for Scientific Affairs of the Institute. Subsequently, from 2008 to 2015, he was its Director, and in 2023 he reassumed this position. From 2009 to 2015 and again since 2023, he has served as Chair of the Board of Directors of the GeoPlanet Earth and Planet Research Centre.

In 1991–1992, he completed a research fellowship as a visiting scholar at the State University of New York in the United States. He also carried out research fellowships and conducted scientific research at numerous international institutions. In 1991, he received a scholarship from the Deutsche Forschungsgemeinschaft at the Institut für Geographie und Geoökologie in Berlin and a scholarship from the Stefan Batory Foundation at the Central European University in Budapest. In 1993, he received the Stony Brook Foundation Individual Grant, and in 1994 he obtained a fellowship from the Foundation for Polish Science. In 2000, he completed a research fellowship at the National Center for Ecological Analysis and Synthesis in Santa Barbara, United States..

In 2012–2014, he served as Deputy Chair of the Board of Curators of Division III of the Polish Academy of Sciences, covering Mathematical, Physical and Earth Sciences. From 2015 to 2018 and from 2019 to 2022, as Vice-President of the Polish Academy of Sciences, he was responsible for the development of international cooperation, the internationalisation of the Academy's activities, and supporting scientific excellence. He was the initiator of the establishment of the Office of Scientific Excellence of the Polish Academy of Sciences, co-creator of the PASIFIC fellowship programme, funded under the Marie Skłodowska-Curie COFUND programme, and coordinator of the Advisory Team to the President of the Polish Academy of Sciences on the Climate Crisis.

From 2018 to 2024, he served as a member of the Board of All European Academies (ALLEA), and in 2024 he became its President. He is a member of the Board and, since 2026, Vice-Chair of Science Advice for Policy by European Academies (SAPEA). Since 2022, he has served as Chair of the European Division of the International Association for Hydro-Environment Engineering and Research (IAHR Europe).

He has been actively involved in activities aimed at the development of the Polish Academy of Sciences, including initiatives of a strategic nature. He chairs the team responsible for preparing the assumptions for a draft amendment to the Act on the Polish Academy of Sciences and previously also chaired the team responsible for developing regulations governing the election of PAS members. He is also Chair of the PAS Scholarship Committee and the advisory team to the President of PAS responsible for the allocation of the Academy's budget.

He was the initiator of the establishment of the Office of Scientific Excellence at the Polish Academy of Sciences, which supports Polish researchers applying for grants from the European Research Council (ERC). He is also the initiator and coordinator of the PASIFIC fellowship programme (2019–2024), funded by the European Commission under the Marie Skłodowska-Curie COFUND programme, with a total budget of nearly PLN 50 million. The programme aims to promote innovative research ideas at PAS institutes.

Among Prof. Rowiński's initiatives was also the establishment, and currently coordination, of the work of the Advisory Team to the President of the Polish Academy of Sciences on the Climate Crisis. The team regularly prepares and disseminates statements concerning various aspects of the impact of climate change on the social and economic life of Poland.

He has served on the scientific councils of numerous research institutes, including the Institute of Geophysics of the Polish Academy of Sciences (since 2004), the Institute of Oceanology of the Polish Academy of Sciences (2011–2014, 2015–2018), the Nicolaus Copernicus Astronomical Centre of the Polish Academy of Sciences (2015–2018), and the Institute of Geological Sciences of the Polish Academy of Sciences (2015–2018). Prof. Rowiński is also actively involved in the work of several committees of the Polish Academy of Sciences, including the Council for the Popularisation of Science of PAS (since 2008), the PAS Committee on Water-Related Hazards (2011–2014), the PAS Committee on Water Management (2011–2014, since 2020), and the PAS Committee of Geophysics (since 2007).

He has also served on the scientific councils of the Polish Geological Institute – National Research Institute (2008–2015) and the Institute of Physical Geography at the University of Warsaw (2005–2008, 2012–2016). Between 2014 and 2016, he was a member of the Board of the National Scientific Leading Centre for Polar Studies and a member of the Polar Task Force at the Ministry of Foreign Affairs. From 2011 to 2015, he served as Chair of the Interdisciplinary Team for International Cooperation at the Ministry of Science and Higher Education.

He is the organiser of the annual celebrations of World Water Day, which have received UNESCO patronage since 2020.

== Major scientific achievements ==
His scientific work includes research in the fields of environmental hydrodynamics, river hydraulics, hydrology, environmental geophysics, and modelling of processes occurring in aquatic environments. His research is interdisciplinary in nature and combines theoretical studies, mathematical modelling, laboratory experiments, and field measurements conducted under natural conditions (in rivers). His work includes both fundamental and applied research, with applications in water management, environmental protection, and the development of climate change adaptation strategies. The results of his research have been published, among others, in journals such as Earth-Science Reviews, Water Resources Research, Journal of Hydrology, Hydrology and Earth System Sciences, and Ecohydrology & Hydrobiology.

One of the main areas of his research is the analysis of mechanisms governing turbulent transport of mass and energy in rivers. He has developed models describing substance mixing processes in river flows and has conducted studies on turbulence structures in channels with complex geometry and varying vegetation. The results of these studies have contributed to a better understanding of the processes responsible for pollutant transport and the functioning of river ecosystems.

He conducts research on river metabolism and gas exchange between water and the atmosphere, analysing the influence of hydrological processes on the functioning of aquatic ecosystems. He also studies water quality, heat and pollutant transport, and the assessment of climate change impacts on aquatic environments.

A significant part of his scientific achievements consists of research on river sediment transport, erosion and sedimentation processes, and the impact of vegetation on water flow. Studies on the movement of individual grains in turbulent flow, initiated already in his doctoral dissertation, and the improvement of Lagrangian models describing the movement of solid particles in river flows have significantly enhanced the ability to describe sediment transport processes. These studies have found applications in environmental hydraulics, water management, and river protection.

An important area of his scientific activity is the development of methods for modelling environmental processes using statistical methods and artificial intelligence tools, including neural networks and optimisation algorithms. These studies focus primarily on modelling hydrological processes, analysis of environmental data, and forecasting extreme phenomena.

In recent years, his research interests have also focused on water security, resilience to the impacts of climate change, and nature-based solutions.

He is the author or co-author of approximately 200 scientific publications, and the author, co-author, editor, or co-editor of 17 international monographs and edited volumes, as well as five special issues of international scientific journals. He is the founder and Editor-in-Chief of the Springer book series GeoPlanet: Earth and Planetary Sciences, under which 40 volumes have been published. He is also a member of the editorial boards of international scientific journals in the fields of hydrology, hydraulics, and environmental sciences, including SpringerBriefs in Earth Sciences, Water, Publications of the Institute of Geophysics Series, Hydrological Sciences Journal, Archives of Hydro-Engineering and Environmental Mechanics, and Ecohydrology & Hydrobiology.

== Science communication and outreach ==
He is actively involved in activities aimed at promoting science, gives lectures, and is frequently present in the media, commenting on issues related to the organisation of science, the climate crisis, and water-related challenges. He was appointed Honorary Chair of the Scientific Committee of the 2022 Science Picnic organised by the Copernicus Science Centre and Polish Radio. He participates in the jury of the "Krok w przyszłość" competition for the best student thesis in mathematics organised by the mBank Foundation.

He has delivered lectures in two educational programmes: the MBA programme in Energy and Climate Policy Management and the Competency Studies programme in Climate and Environment at the Paweł Adamowicz Civic Studies Centre. At the Centre for Eastern Studies, he contributed as a commentator to the report Drought in the Czech Republic. Political, Economic and Social Consequences and delivered a lecture on drought in Europe. He has been a member of the Science Dissemination Council of the Polish Academy of Sciences since 2011.

He has delivered numerous plenary lectures and invited talks at various scientific institutions, including lectures during the inauguration of the academic year at the Warsaw University of Life Sciences (SGGW) (2020), at the Faculty of Oceanography and Geography of the University of Gdańsk (2018), during the conference Climate Change, Health of the Planet and Future of Humanity (2018) at Casina Pio IV, Pontifical Academy of Sciences, Vatican City, the 5th Workshop on River and Sedimentation Hydrodynamics and Morphodynamics in Porto, the International Symposium on Ecohydrology for the Circular Economy and Nature-Based Solutions towards mitigation/adaptation to Climate Change, as well as at University College London, the University of Padua, the University of Versailles Saint-Quentin-en-Yvelines, and other institutions.

He frequently contributes to discussions on the future of education.

He served as Honorary Chair of the Scientific Committee of the Science Picnic organised by Polish Radio and the 2022 Science Picnic organised by the Copernicus Science Centre and Polish Radio. He was also a member of the jury of the "Krok w przyszłość" competition organised by the mBank Foundation. He has been a member of the Science Dissemination Council of the Polish Academy of Sciences since 2011.

He has supervised numerous diploma theses, including five doctoral dissertations.

== Selected media appearances ==
- He publishes in the science popularisation journal Academia of the Polish Academy of Sciences.
- Radio programmes.
- Television programmes.
- Participation in the documentary film Co z tą wodą (What about this water?) broadcast on TVP1.
- Extensive press interviews, including:
  - Przyroda jest skuteczniejsza (Nature is more effective), Dziennik Gazeta Prawna, 20 March 2021.
  - Interview in Gazeta Wyborcza, Wolna Sobota magazine, 5 November 2021.
  - Od Bałtyku po Mazury. W jakiej wodzie będziemy się kąpać tego lata? (From the Baltic Sea to Masuria. What kind of water will we swim in this summer?), Gazeta Wyborcza, 25 June 2021.
  - Jeśli nic nie zrobimy, zrealizują się katastroficzne scenariusze (If we do nothing, catastrophic scenarios will come true), Interia, 12 August 2019.
  - Polsce zagraża susza. Jak się chronić? (Poland is threatened by drought. How can we protect ourselves?), Polska Metropolia Warszawska, Polska The Times, 13 May 2022.

He has participated in radio programmes and television programmes devoted to hydrology, water management, climate change, and science policy.

== Major awards and distinctions ==
He received the Prime Minister of Poland's Award for both his doctoral dissertation and habilitation thesis. He was a scholarship holder of the Foundation for Polish Science and the Stefan Batory Foundation. In 2015, he received the Bene Merito honorary badge from the Minister of Foreign Affairs in recognition of his contributions to promoting and strengthening Poland's position internationally. In 2016, he received the Central European University Alumni Impact Award (he was only the second person from Poland to receive this distinction, after the Ombudsman, Prof. Adam Bodnar). In 2017, he was awarded the Medal of the Vietnam Academy of Science and Technology, and in 2019 and 2026 he received the Medal of the Warsaw University of Life Sciences (SGGW).

In 2022, he was elected a full member of the Polish Academy of Sciences. In 2023, he was elected President of the European Federation of Academies of Sciences and Humanities (ALLEA) and awarded the Silver Cross of Merit.

== Personal life ==
He is married to Agata Rowińska, with whom he has a daughter Paulina.

== Selected publications ==
Articles

- Rowiński, Paweł M.; Guymer, Ian; Kwiatkowski, Kamil (2008). "Response to the slug injection of a tracer–a large-scale experiment in a natural river". Hydrological Sciences Journal. 53 (6): 1300–1309. doi:10.1623/hysj.53.6.1300. S2CID 128879028.
- Rowiński, Paweł M.; Piotrowski, Adam (2008). "Estimation of parameters of the transient storage model by means of multi-layer perceptron neural networks". Hydrological Sciences Journal. 53 (1): 165–178. doi:10.1623/hysj.53.1.165. S2CID 129594278.
- Rowiński, Paweł M.; Piotrowski, Adam; Napiórkowski, Jarosław J. (2005). "Are artificial neural network techniques relevant for the estimation of longitudinal dispersion coefficient in rivers?". Hydrological Sciences Journal. 50 (1): 175–187. doi:10.1623/hysj.50.1.175.56339. S2CID 140142817.
- Rowiński, Paweł M. (2002). "Constituent Transport" (PDF). Encyclopaedia of Life Support Systems. Oxford, UK: Eolss Publishers.
- Rajwa-Kuligiewicz, Agnieszka; Bialik, Robert J.; Rowiński, Paweł M. (2015). "Dissolved oxygen and water temperature dynamics in lowland rivers over various timescales". Journal of Hydrology and Hydromechanics. 63 (4): 353–363. Bibcode:2015JHyHy..63..353R. doi:10.1515/johh-2015-0041.
- Rowiński, Paweł M.; Västilä, Kaisa; Aberle, Jochen; Järvelä, Juha; Kalinowska, Monika B. (2018). "How vegetation can aid in coping with river management challenges: A brief review". Ecohydrology & Hydrobiology. 18 (4): 345–354. Bibcode:2018EcHyd..18..345R. doi:10.1016/j.ecohyd.2018.07.003.
- Caroppi, Gerardo; Västilä, Kaisa; Gualtieri, Paola; Järvelä, Juha; Giugni, Maurizio; Rowiński, Paweł M. (2021). "Comparison of Flexible and Rigid Vegetation Induced Shear Layers in Partly Vegetated Channels". Water Resources Research. 57 (3) e2020WR028243. Bibcode:2021WRR....5728243C. doi:10.1029/2020WR028243.
- Rowiński, Paweł M.; Okruszko, Tomasz; Radecki-Pawlik, Artur (2022). "Environmental hydraulics research for river health: recent advances and challenges". Ecohydrology & Hydrobiology. 22 (2): 213–225. Bibcode:2022EcHyd..22..213R. doi:10.1016/j.ecohyd.2021.12.003.
- Hamidifar, Hossein; Yaghoubi, Faezeh; Rowinski, Pawel M. (2024). "Using multi-criteria decision-making methods in prioritizing structural flood control solutions: A case study from Iran". Journal of Flood Risk Management. 17 (3) e12991. Bibcode:2024JFRM...17E2991H. doi:10.1111/jfr3.12991.
- Chauhan, Geetika; Kuptel-Markiewicz, Iwona; Almeida, Igo Silva De; Rowiński, Paweł M. (2025). "The rhythm of Polish rivers: application of wavelet transform to identify flow regimes". Hydrological Sciences Journal. 70 (11): 1893–1912. Bibcode:2025HydSJ..70.1893C. doi:10.1080/02626667.2025.2513479.

Books

- Czernuszenko, Włodzimierz; Rowiński, Paweł M. (2005). Water Quality Hazards and Dispersion of Pollutants. Springer. doi:10.1007/b101189. ISBN 978-0-387-23321-5.
- Rowiński, Paweł (2013). Experimental and Computational Solutions of Hydraulic Problems. GeoPlanet: Earth and Planetary Sciences. Springer Berlin Heidelberg. Bibcode:2013ecsh.book.....R. doi:10.1007/978-3-642-30209-1. ISBN 978-3-642-30208-4.
- Rowiński, Paweł; Radecki-Pawlik, Artur, eds. (2015). Rivers – Physical, Fluvial and Environmental Processes. GeoPlanet: Earth and Planetary Sciences. Springer International Publishing. Bibcode:2015rpfe.book.....R. doi:10.1007/978-3-319-17719-9. ISBN 978-3-319-17718-2.
