= Academies of Belgium =

Belgian academic learned societies

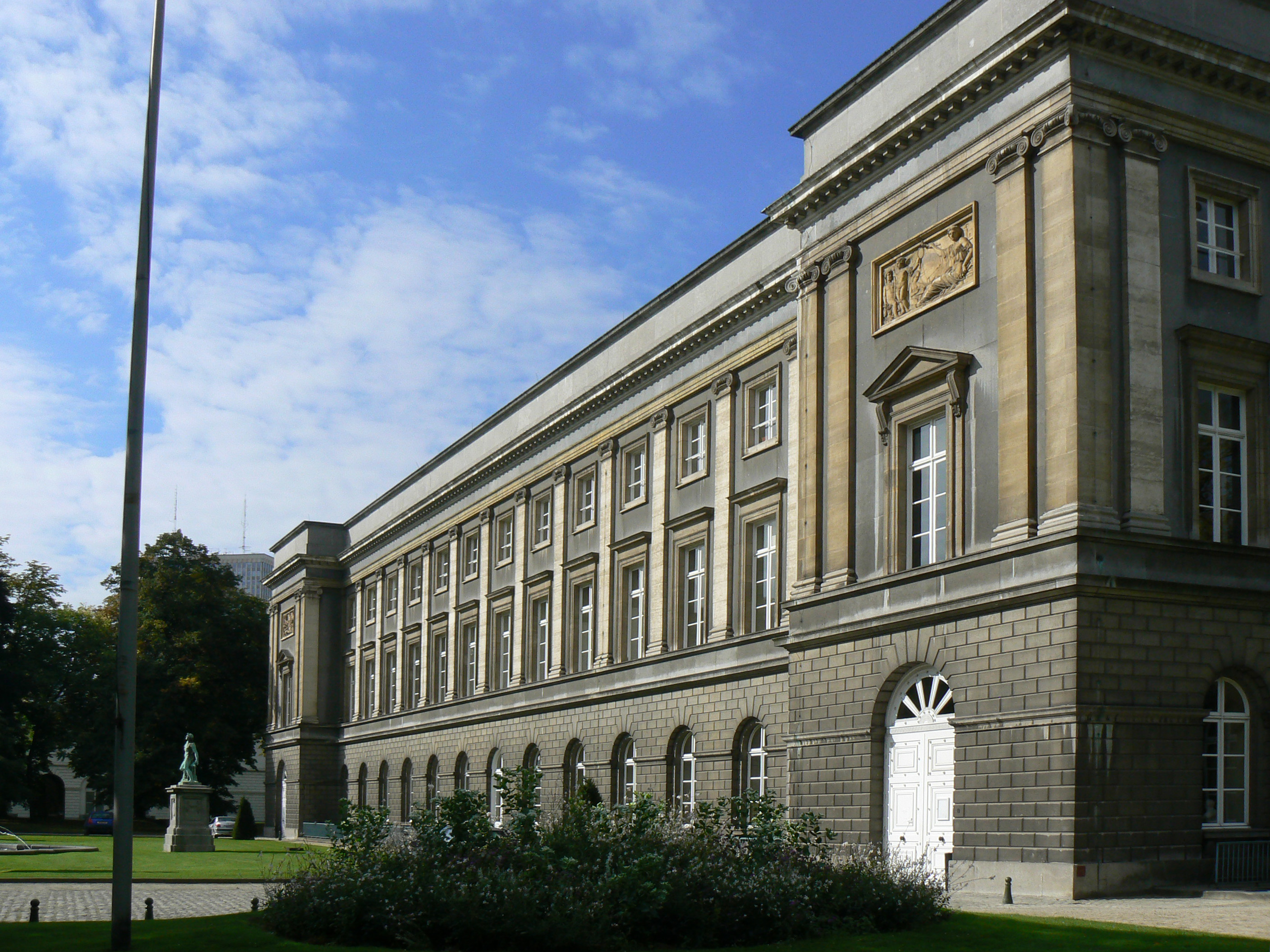
The Academy Palace in Brussels which today houses five academies

In Belgium, academies are publicly funded learned societies, often divided by academic discipline or linguistic group. Besides holding meetings, many publish academic monographs, peer-reviewed journals and hold conferences. Membership is usually by election and non-Belgians are usually admitted only as corresponding members. Originating during the Enlightenment, the concept can be traced to the Imperial and Royal Academy of Brussels, which was the first academy in Belgium, founded in 1772 by the Empress Maria Theresa when the country was under Austrian rule.

The principal academies in Belgium are interdisciplinary but divided linguistically. Both trace their origins to the original academy of 1772 and are based in the Academy Palace in Brussels, which also houses three others. They are:

- Royal Academy of Sciences, Literature and Fine Arts of Belgium (ARB), a French-speaking institution known as the "Theresean Academy";
- Royal Flemish Academy of Belgium for Science and the Arts (KVAB), a Dutch-speaking institution, which became independent in 1938.

Collectively, the two academies frequently collaborate under the umbrella organisation of the Royal Academies for Science and the Arts of Belgium (RASAB), founded in 2001, and a member of the International Science Council.

There are two literary academies, also divided linguistically:

- Royal Academy of French Language and Literature of Belgium (ARLLFB, founded 1920)
- Royal Academy of Dutch Language and Literature of Belgium (KANTL, founded 1886)

There are two academies of medicine, divided linguistically and with the same names:

- Académie royale de médecine de Belgique (ARMB, founded 1841)
- Koninklijke Academie voor Geneeskunde van België (KAGB, founded 1938)

Other subject-specific bilingual academies exist:

- Académie Royale des Beaux-Arts (ARBA, founded 1711) (not to be confused with the Royal Academy of Fine Arts (Antwerp), an art school)
- Royal Academy of Archaeology of Belgium (ACAD, founded 1842)
- Royal Academy for Overseas Sciences (KAOW/ARSOM, founded 1928)

== See also ==
- All European Academies
