= Valerie M. Weaver =

Professor and the director

Valerie M. Weaver is a professor and the director of the Center for Bioengineering and Tissue Regeneration in the department of surgery and co-director Bay Area Center for Physical Sciences and Oncology at the University of California San Francisco (USA). She has been working and leading oncology research for more than 20 years. Her scientific contributions have been recognised by different awards. She was the first woman to receive the Shu Chien Award from the Biomedical Engineering Society in 2022, which honours contributions in the cellular and molecular bioengineering field.

== Career ==
Weaver has two bachelor's degrees - one in chemistry from the University of Waterloo and one in biochemistry from the University of Ottawa. She also earned her PhD degree in biochemistry from the University of Ottawa in 1992. After that, she did postdoctoral training at the National Research Council of Canada for two years, followed by another 5-year postdoctoral at the Lawrence Berkeley National Laboratory at the University of California Berkeley with Mina J Bissell in cancer cell biology.

In 1999, Weaver became an assistant professor in the department of pathology at the University of Pennsylvania, where she continued studying breast cancer and tissue architecture using organotypic models. During this period and in collaboration with scientists from the Institute for Medicine and Engineering, Weaver published a breakthrough discovery on breast tumour behaviour induction by demonstrating how integrin signalling modification by tissue tension disrupts the morphogenesis of breast tissue.

In 2006, she moved to University of California San Francisco to assume the position of associate professor in the department of surgery with a joint appointment in anatomy and director of the Centre for Bioengineering and Tissue Regeneration, where she became a full professor in 2010. She is also a member of two other institutions: the Helen Diller Cancer Center and the Eli and Broad Stem Cell Center.

Weaver and her research team's interdisciplinary research are focused on exploring cell and tissue level force in gliomas and breast and pancreatic cancers. Recently, they have been studying how these forces can regulate early development.

== Awards ==
- Breast Cancer Scholar Award in 2005 and Scholar Expansion award in 2013 with the Department of Defense
- American Association for Cancer Research Pancreatic Action Network Award in 2013
- American Society for Cell Biology's Women in Cell Biology Midcareer award in 2014
- Fellow to the American Institute for Medical and Biological Engineering in 2014
- Fellow of the American Society for Cell Biology in 2017
- Shu Chien Award from the Biomedical Engineering Society in 2022

== Selected publications ==
- Wu, Bin; Liu, Di-Ao; Guan, Lei; Myint, Phyoe Kyawe; Chin, Likang; Dang, Hien; Xu, Ye; Ren, Jinqi; Li, Ting; Yu, Ziyan; Jabban, Sophie; Mills, Gordon B.; Nukpezah, Jonathan; Chen, Youhai H.; Furth, Emma E.; Gimotty, Phyllis A.; Wells, Rebecca G.; Weaver, Valerie M.; Radhakrishnan, Ravi; Wang, Xin Wei; Guo, Wei (2023). "Stiff matrix induces exosome secretion to promote tumour growth". Nature Cell Biology. 25 (3): 415–424. doi:10.1038/s41556-023-01092-1. PMC 10351222. PMID 36797475.
- Northey, Jason J.; Weaver, Valerie M. (2023). "Extracellular Matrix Glycation and Crosslinking in Mammary Tumor Progression". The Tumor Microenvironment. Methods in Molecular Biology. Vol. 2614. pp. 247–260. doi:10.1007/978-1-0716-2914-7_15. ISBN 978-1-0716-2913-0. PMC 10977607. PMID 36587129.
- Paszek, Matthew J.; Zahir, Nastaran; Johnson, Kandice R.; Lakins, Johnathon N.; Rozenberg, Gabriela I.; Gefen, Amit; Reinhart-King, Cynthia A.; Margulies, Susan S.; Dembo, Micah; Boettiger, David; Hammer, Daniel A.; Weaver, Valerie M. (2005). "Tensional homeostasis and the malignant phenotype". Cancer Cell. 8 (3): 241–254. doi:10.1016/j.ccr.2005.08.010. PMID 16169468.
- Frantz, Christian; Stewart, Kathleen M.; Weaver, Valerie M. (2010). "The extracellular matrix at a glance". Journal of Cell Science. 123 (24): 4195–4200. doi:10.1242/jcs.023820. PMC 2995612. PMID 21123617.
- Levental, Kandice R.; Yu, Hongmei; Kass, Laura; Lakins, Johnathon N.; Egeblad, Mikala; Erler, Janine T.; Fong, Sheri F.T.; Csiszar, Katalin; Giaccia, Amato; Weninger, Wolfgang; Yamauchi, Mitsuo; Gasser, David L.; Weaver, Valerie M. (2009). "Matrix Crosslinking Forces Tumor Progression by Enhancing Integrin Signaling". Cell. 139 (5): 891–906. Bibcode:2009Cell..139..891L. doi:10.1016/j.cell.2009.10.027. PMC 2788004. PMID 19931152.
- Lu, Pengfei; Weaver, Valerie M.; Werb, Zena (2012). "The extracellular matrix: A dynamic niche in cancer progression". Journal of Cell Biology. 196 (4): 395–406. doi:10.1083/jcb.201102147. PMC 3283993. PMID 22351925.
- Yeung, Tony; Georges, Penelope C.; Flanagan, Lisa A.; Marg, Beatrice; Ortiz, Miguelina; Funaki, Makoto; Zahir, Nastaran; Ming, Wenyu; Weaver, Valerie; Janmey, Paul A. (2005). "Effects of substrate stiffness on cell morphology, cytoskeletal structure, and adhesion". Cell Motility and the Cytoskeleton. 60 (1): 24–34. doi:10.1002/cm.20041. PMID 15573414.
