= Annette Grüters-Kieslich =

German pediatrician

Annette Grüters-Kieslich is a German pediatrician with a sub specialty in endocrinology, especially childhood obesity and former dean of the Berlin University Hospital Charité.
