= Jonathan D. Licht =

American hematologist

Academic background
- Education: Columbia University (M.D.); Harvard Medical School (Residency and Fellowship)
- Website: licht.cancer.ufl.edu

Jonathan D. Licht is an American physician who has served as director of the University of Florida Health Cancer Institute since 2015, holding The Marshall E. Rinker Sr. Chair. Licht led the UF Health Cancer Institute to achieve designation from the National Cancer Institute in June 2023.

== Career ==
A graduate of Columbia University College of Physicians and Surgeons, Licht completed his internal medicine residency and medical oncology fellowship at Harvard Medical School and the Dana-Farber Cancer Institute. Early in his career, he was a professor and chief of hematology/oncology at the Icahn School of Medicine at Mount Sinai. Licht was the Johanna Dobe Professor and chief of the Division of Medicine-Hematology/Oncology at Northwestern University.

Licht’s laboratory studies aberrant gene regulation as a cause of blood and other cancers and is developing treatment strategies to reverse abnormal, cancer-causing gene functions. Licht’s cancer career spans nearly three decades, and his research program covers over 30 years of continuous NCI and national foundation funding. Licht leads a Specialized Center of Research program from the Leukemia and Lymphoma Society and is principal investigator of three National Cancer Institute R01 grants. He has trained over a dozen PhD and MD-PhD students and more than 30 postdoctoral fellows who have gone on to positions in academia and industry. He has recruited and mentored numerous clinical and basic research faculty members.

He has authored more than 220 original articles, reviews and book chapters. He is an associate editor of Oncogene and serves on the Editorial Boards of Blood Cancer Discovery, Cancer Research, Clinical Cancer Research, and Clinical Epigenetics.

Licht has served in senior positions in the American Society of Hematology (Councilor, Co-Director of the ASH/European Hematology Association Translational Training in Hematology), the American Association for Cancer Research (chair, Taskforce of Hematological Malignancies), and Leukemia and Lymphoma Society (vice chair, Medical-Scientific Board). He has chaired the review panel for Specialized Center grants of the Leukemia and Lymphoma Society, served two years as chair of the Biochemical of the Mechanisms of Cancer Therapy-I study section of NIH and led the 2019 Gordon Conference on Cancer Genetics and Epigenetics.

== Awards ==
Licht received the 2021 American Society of Hematology Basic Sciences Mentor Award. In 2024, he was named a 2023 Fellow of the American Association for the Advancement of Science (AAAS), a distinguished lifetime honor within the scientific community.
