= Reza Ghodssi =

Iranian professor

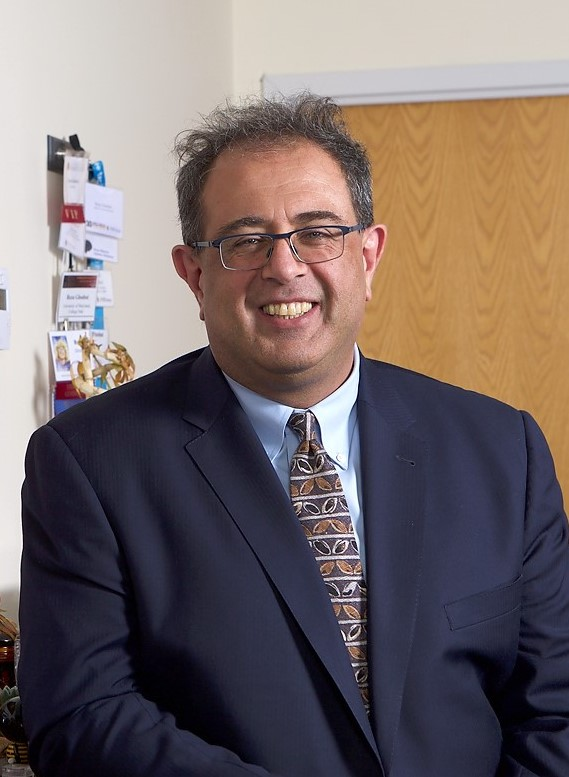
- Born: 1966 (age 59–60); Tehran, Iran
- Education: University of Wisconsin–Madison
- Known for: Micro-electro-mechanical Systems (MEMS) Processes, Technology, Devices and Systems
- Awards: American Vacuum Society Gaede-Langmuir Award, 2024; National Science Foundation NSF CAREER Award, 2002; UMD Distinguished Scholar-Teacher, 2014; UW-M 125 People of Impact, 2016
- Scientific career
- Fields: Electrical engineering, Biomedical engineering
- Workplaces: University of Maryland, College Park, 2000–present Massachusetts Institute of Technology, 1997–1999
- Doctoral advisor: Denice D. Denton

Reza Ghodssi is a University Distinguished Professor in the Department of Electrical and Computer Engineering and the Institute for Systems Research (ISR) at the University of Maryland, College Park, where he directs the MEMS Sensors and Actuators Lab and holds the Herbert Rabin Distinguished Chair in Engineering. Ghodssi is also the inaugural executive director of research and innovation for the A. James Clark School of Engineering at the University System of Maryland at Southern Maryland (USMSM). He is best known for his work designing micro- and nano-devices for healthcare applications, particularly for systems requiring small-scale energy conversion and biological and chemical sensing.

== Biography and scholarship ==
Ghodssi received his bachelor's (1990), master's (1992), and doctoral (1996) degrees in electrical engineering from the University of Wisconsin-Madison. He then performed his postdoctoral work at the Massachusetts Institute of Technology from 1997 to 1999, joining the faculty at the University of Maryland in 2000. Between 2009 and 2017, Ghodssi directed the ISR, launching a number of interdisciplinary initiatives such as the Maryland Robotics Center (MRC) and the Brain and Behavior Initiative (BBI), of which he served as the founding co-director for six years (2015-2021). These initiatives are aimed at enhancing the impact of ISR's research on society; they also looked to build a more interactive faculty, staff, and student community across the different disciplines within ISR. Efforts at the MRC include advancing the underlying component technologies and the applications of robotics through a focus on interdisciplinary educational and research programs. Work at the BBI aims to revolutionize the interface between neuroscience and engineering by generating novel approaches and tools to understand the complex behaviors produced by the human brain. Part of Ghodssi's community-building also includes reaching out to industry and alumni: these efforts have resulted in a large number of industry-sponsored monthly seminar series as well as annual fellowships for graduate students and postdoctoral associates. Combined, these initiatives work to promote an active industry-oriented mentoring ecosystem in the Systems Engineering Education program in ISR. Dr. Ghodssi served as the President of the Transducer Research Foundation (TRF) from June 2022 through June 2026, following two years of service as President-elect from 2020 to 2022. The TRF is a nonprofit organization in the United States whose mission is to stimulate research in science and engineering, with emphasis on technologies related to transducers, microsystems, and nanosystems, and to foster the exchange of ideas and information between academic, industrial, and government researchers.

Ghodssi has 181 peer-reviewed journal publications and 390 refereed conference papers, and he is the co-editor of the MEMS Materials and Processes Handbook (2011). He has twelve U.S. patents issued, ten U.S. patents published, with another five pending. He also founded the MEMS Alliance in the greater Washington, D.C. area and is a member of the Materials Research Society, the American Society for Engineering Education, and the American Association for the Advancement of Science.

== Service ==
Ghodssi served as an associate editor for the Biomedical Microdevices for 13 years (2008-2021) and served as an editor of the Journal of Microelectromechanical Systems for 12 years (2008-2020). He served as a chairman of the MEMS and NEMS Technical Group at the American Vacuum Society (AVS) from 2002 to 2004. He also served as the Technical Program Committee Chair for the 2020 Solid-State Sensors, Actuators, and Microsystems Workshop (Hilton Head 2020), and the General Chair for the Hilton Head Workshop in 2022. Also, Dr. Ghodssi was the guest associate editor of the IEEE Journal of Microelectromechanical Systems "Special Proceeding" of the Hilton Head 2020 Workshop (October 2020). Ghodssi chaired the 9th International Workshop on Micro and Nanotechnology for Power Generation and Energy Conversion Applications (PowerMEMS 2009) and the 2012 NSF Workshop on Micro, Nano, Bio Systems. He also served as the Americas Technical Program Committee chair of IEEE SENSORS 2010, 2011 and 2012. He chaired the committee for the Denice Denton Emerging Leader ABIE Award sponsored by the Anita Borg Institute for Women and Technology (ABI) and Microsoft from 2007 until 2016. Ghodssi was also the lead organizer and chair of the inaugural Denice Denton Emerging Leaders Workshop 2016, which focuses on helping mid-career faculty develop knowledge, skills, strategies, and critical networks.

== Honors and awards ==
In 2001, Ghodssi received the UMD George Corcoran Award. He won the CAREER award from the National Science Foundation in 2002, and in 2003 he received the UMD Outstanding Systems Engineering Faculty Award. He was among 100 of the nation's outstanding engineers invited to attend the National Academy of Engineering U.S. Frontiers of Engineering Symposium in 2007 and the EU-U.S. Frontiers of Engineering Symposium in 2010. In 2014, Ghodssi was named a University of Maryland Distinguished Scholar-Teacher. He was named a Fellow of the Institute of Electrical and Electronics Engineers in 2015, when he also became a Fellow of the American Vacuum Society (2015) and the American Society of Mechanical Engineers (2015). The University of Wisconsin-Madison Department of Electrical and Computer Engineering listed Ghodssi as one of “125 People of Impact” in 2016, in recognition of his significant contributions to the department, university, and industry. In 2017, Ghodssi received the Invention of the Year Award in the Life Sciences category from the University of Maryland. In 2019, Ghodssi received the distinguished A. J. Clark School of Engineering Senior Faculty Outstanding Research Award at the University of Maryland. He also received the 2024 American Vacuum Society (AVS) Gaede-Langmuir Award for his pioneering research on developing novel MEMS processes, fabrication, and technologies for micro, nano, and bio-devices and systems and their momentous impact on small-scale power, optical, and biomedical applications. In 2025, Ghodssi received the honor of University Distinguished Professor from the University of Maryland, College Park, which is the highest appointment bestowed on a tenured faculty member. It is a recognition not just of excellence, but of impact and significant contribution to the nominee’s field, knowledge, profession, and/or practice.
