= Physical Biology =

- Language: English
- Edited by: Greg Huber

Publication details
- History: 2004–present
- Publisher: IOP Publishing
- Frequency: Bimonthly
- Impact factor: 2.0 (2023)

Standard abbreviations
- ISO 4: Phys. Biol.

Indexing
- CODEN: PBHIAT
- ISSN: 1478-3967 (print); 1478-3975 (web)

Links
- Journal homepage

Physical Biology is a peer-reviewed scientific journal published by IOP Publishing covering a range of fields that bridge the biological and physical sciences, including biophysics, systems biology, population dynamics, etc. The editor-in-chief is Greg Huber (Chan-Zuckerberg Biohub, San Francisco).

The journal is indexed in ISI Web of Science/Science Citation Index, PubMed, MEDLINE, Inspec, Scopus, BIOSIS Previews/Biological Abstracts, EMBASE, EMBiology, and Current Awareness in Biological Sciences.
