= Integrated Biological Detection System =

The Integrated Biological Detection System is a system used by the British Army and Royal Air Force for detecting Chemical, biological, radiological, and nuclear agents or elements. The Integrated Biological Detection System can provide early warning of a chemical or biological warfare attack and is in service with the United Kingdom Joint NBC Regiment. It can be installed in a container which can be mounted on a vehicle or ground dumped. It is also able to be transported by either a fixed-wing aircraft or by helicopter.

The system comprises

- A detection suite, including equipment for atmospheric sampling
- Meteorological station and GPS
- CBRN filtration and environmental control for use in all climates
- Chemical agent detection
- An independent power supply
- Cameras for 360 degree surveillance

A U.S. military system with a similar purpose and a similar name is the Biological Integrated Detection System (BIDS).
