= Royal Academy of Dutch Language and Literature =

National academy in Belgium

Royal Academy of Dutch language and literature Dutch: Koninklijke Academie voor Nederlandse Taal- en Letterkunde (KANTL)
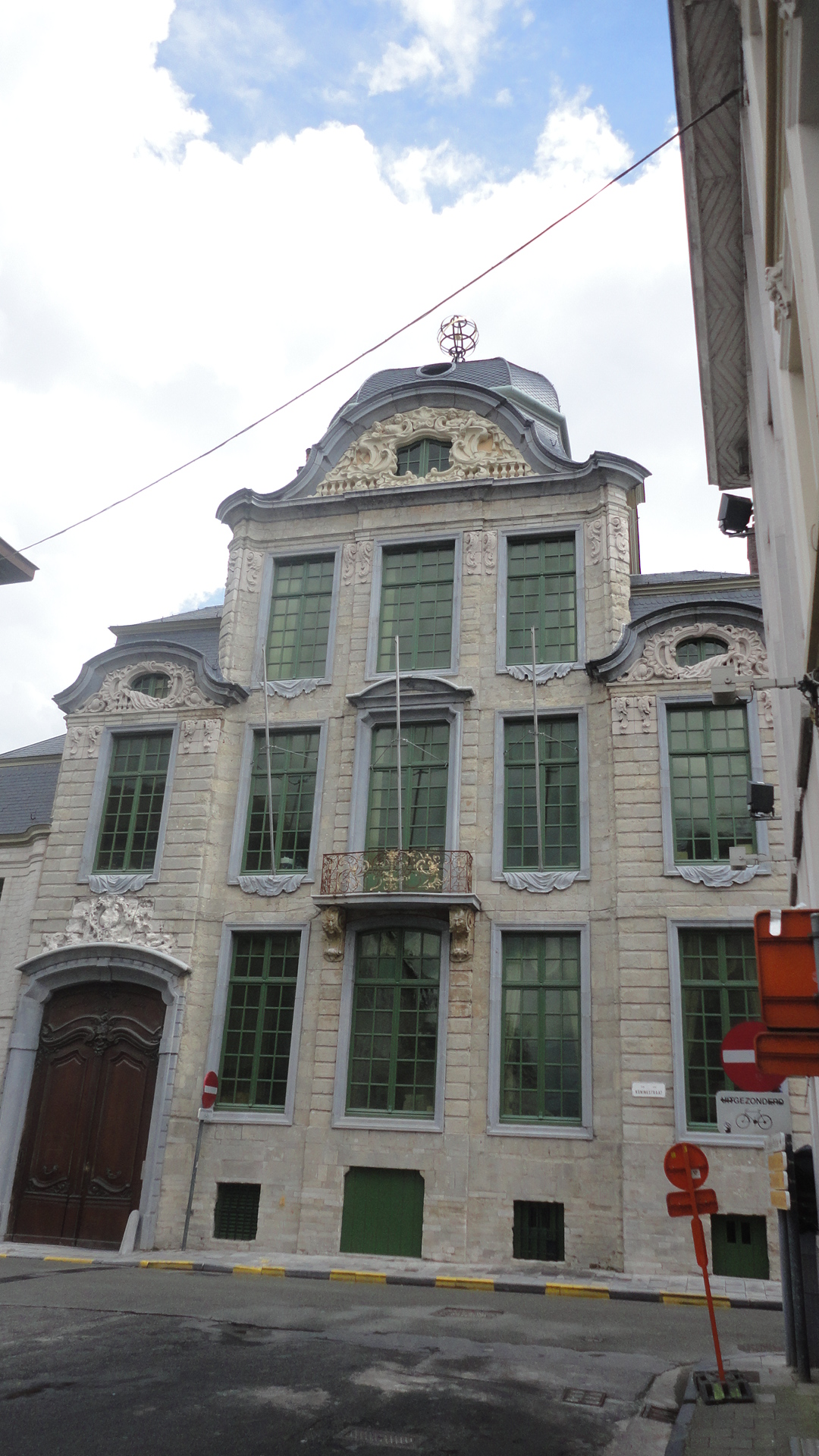
- KANTL
- Formation: 1886
- Headquarters: Huis van Oombergen, Koningsstraat 18 in Ghent, Belgium
- voorzitter (president): Leen van Dijck
- Website: http://www.kantl.be

The Royal Flemish Academy for Dutch Language and Literature (Dutch: Koninklijke Academie voor Nederlandse Taal en Letteren, pronounced [ˈkoːnɪŋkləkə ˌaːkaːˈdeːmi voːr ˈneːdərlɑntsə ˈtaːl ɛn ˈlɛtərə(n)], abbr. KANTL) is an institution focused on the study and promotion of the Dutch language in Flanders. It is the Dutch-speaking counterpart of the Académie royale de langue et de littérature françaises de Belgique and one of Belgium's numerous academies.

== History ==
The Royal Flemish Academy of Dutch Language and Literature (abbreviated to KANTL) is a government organization which was established in 1886 by Royal Decree as Koninklijke Vlaamse Academie voor Taal- en Letterkunde.

In 1972 the name of The Royal Flemish Academy for language and literature was changed to The Royal Academy of Dutch language and literature, and in 1981 the existence of the academy was confirmed by a decree of the Council for Cultural Affairs for the Dutch cultural community (the predecessor of the Flemish Parliament) (decree of 13 February 1980). The KANTL is now an institution of the Flemish Government.

The academy was the first official institution of Belgium where the Dutch language was examined scientifically and to encourage coordination between scientific academic fields using the Dutch language. This ended in 1938 when the Royal Flemish Academy of Belgium for Science and the Arts and the Royal Academy of Medicine of Belgium were set up. From this point on the academy's power was limited to the Dutch language and its literature. To do this, it is still has an advisory function for the Flemish government. The Flemish Academy played an important role in Flemish emancipation and brought the Flemish Movement culturally and intellectually to a higher level. In political terms, however, the academy is always neutral.

Since 1939 The academy consists of 30 members and 25 foreign honorary Members.

The Royal Flemish Academy of Dutch Language and Literature is housed in the House of Oombergen in the Koningsstraat in Ghent. The building was restored in 2012.

== Royal Academy of Dutch language and literature Prize ==
Since its early days, the Royal Academy has issued an annual prize for what the academy considered outstanding research and work in the Dutch language. However, since 2005 this has changed to a more general calling for those working in the field of Dutch language and literature. Thus a prize is offered for an essay, for a study on the old Dutch language, for literature, for poetry, for prose and for culture.

== Prize Winners 2003–2020 ==
- 2020 Jeroen Olyslaegers (Writer)
- 2019 Ester Naomi Perquin (Poet)
- 2018 Thijs Lijster (Writer)
- 2017 Stijn Devillé (Director)
- 2016 Ilja Leonard Pfeijffer (Writer)
- 2015 Leonard Nolens (Poet)
- 2013 Eric de Kuyper (Director)
- 2012 Tom Lanoye (Writer)
- 2011 Arnon Grunberg (Writer)
- 2010 Leo Vroman (Poet)
- 2009 Helmut Tervooren
- 2008 Stefan Hertmans (Writer)
- 2007 David Van Reybrouck (Historian)
- 2006 Stefan Brijs (Writer)
- 2005 Gerrit Kouwenaar (Poet)
- 2004 Peter Louis Seize
- 2003 Jan de Roder

== See also ==
- Dutch Language Union
- Royal Flemish Academy of Belgium for Science and the Arts
