= Elisabeth Smela =

American mechanical engineer and polymer scientist

Elisabeth Smela is an American mechanical engineer and polymer scientist known for her research on electroactive polymers with applications including micro-electromechanical systems, biomedical devices, and controlled folding on a microscopic scale. Her research has also included the development of a "nose on a chip" based on insect cells. She is a professor of mechanical engineering in the A. James Clark School of Engineering of the University of Maryland, College Park.

== Education and career ==
Smela majored in physics as an undergraduate at the Massachusetts Institute of Technology. She continued her studies in electrical engineering at the University of Pennsylvania, where she received a master's degree and completed her Ph.D., also including a summer internship in Tsukuba, Japan in 1991. Her 1992 doctoral dissertation, The effect of substrate topology on smectic liquid crystal alignment: A high-resolution x-ray diffraction study, was supervised by Luz Martinez-Miranda.

She became a postdoctoral researcher at Linköping University in Sweden, continuing there as a research scientist. Next, she moved to the Risø National Laboratory in Denmark as a senior scientist, and then to Santa Fe Science and Technology, Inc. in New Mexico as vice president of research and development. She began working for the University of Maryland in 2000, and was promoted to full professor in 2011.

== Recognition ==
Smela was a 2003 recipient of the Presidential Early Career Award for Scientists and Engineers, "for developing a new, robust, autonomous actuator technology, which, when incorporated into micro-electro-mechanical systems (MEMS), could advance new devices for walking, manipulating or flying".

The University of Maryland named her as one of five Campus Women of Influence in 2019, recognizing her as "an active and effective advocate and mentor for women in a field where they are underrepresented.".
