= Adèle Koekkoek =

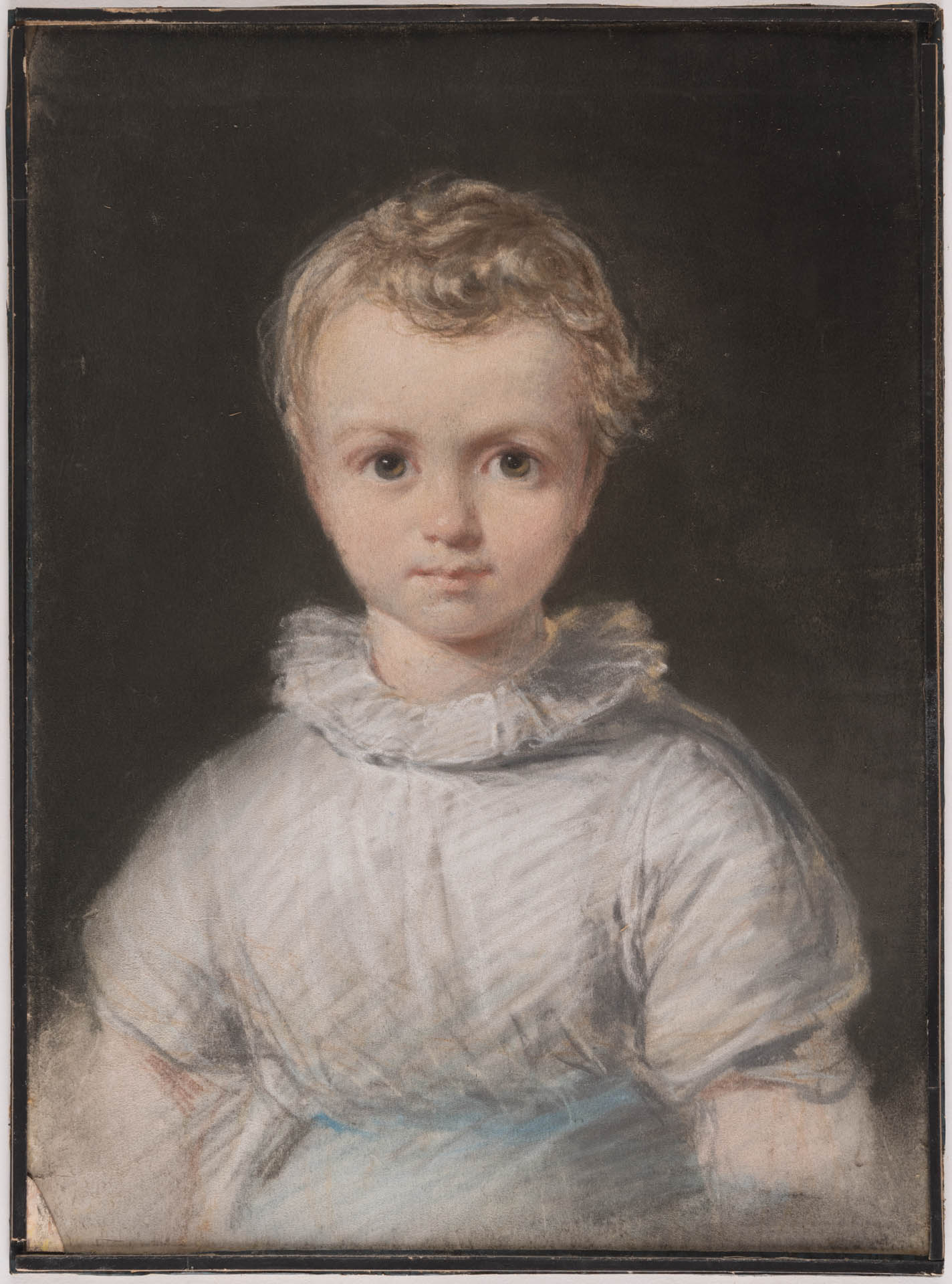
- Adèle Koekkoek as a child, pastel portrait by her grandfather Jean Augustin Daiwaille, 1844
- Born: Adelaide Alexandrine Koekkoek; October 28, 1838; Kleve
- Died: 1919 (aged 80–81); Koblenz

Adelaide Alexandrine Koekkoek (1838 – 1919) was a German still life painter from Kleve.

Koekkoek was born as the fourth daughter of five to two painters. Her Dutch father Barend Cornelis Koekkoek had built a reputation as a landscape artist specializing in finely articulated country scenes before moving to Kleve with her mother Elise Thérèse Koekkoek-Daiwaille. She became a still life painter in the style of her mother and grandfather. Her sister Marie Louise painted landscapes.

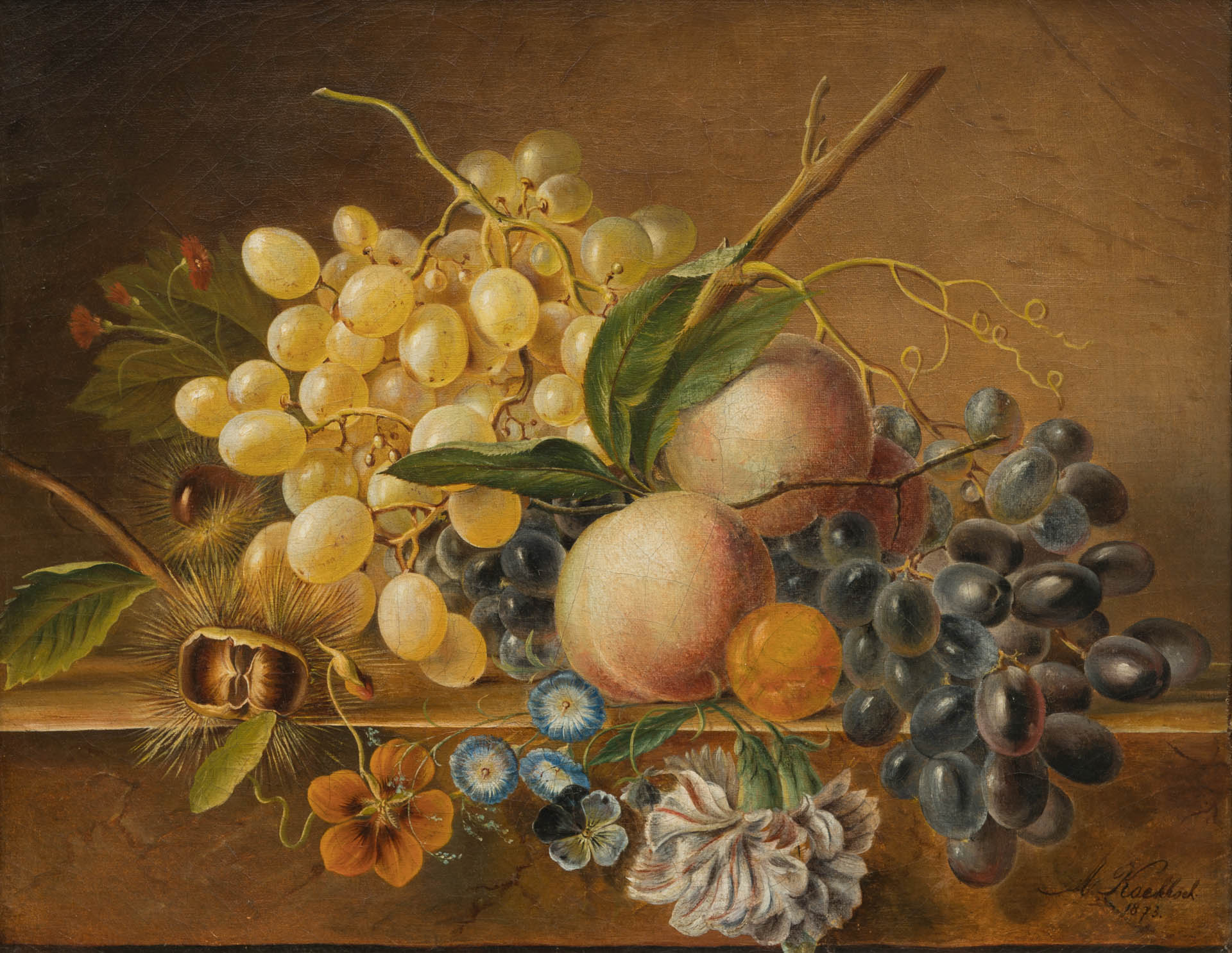
Fruit and flower painting, 1873

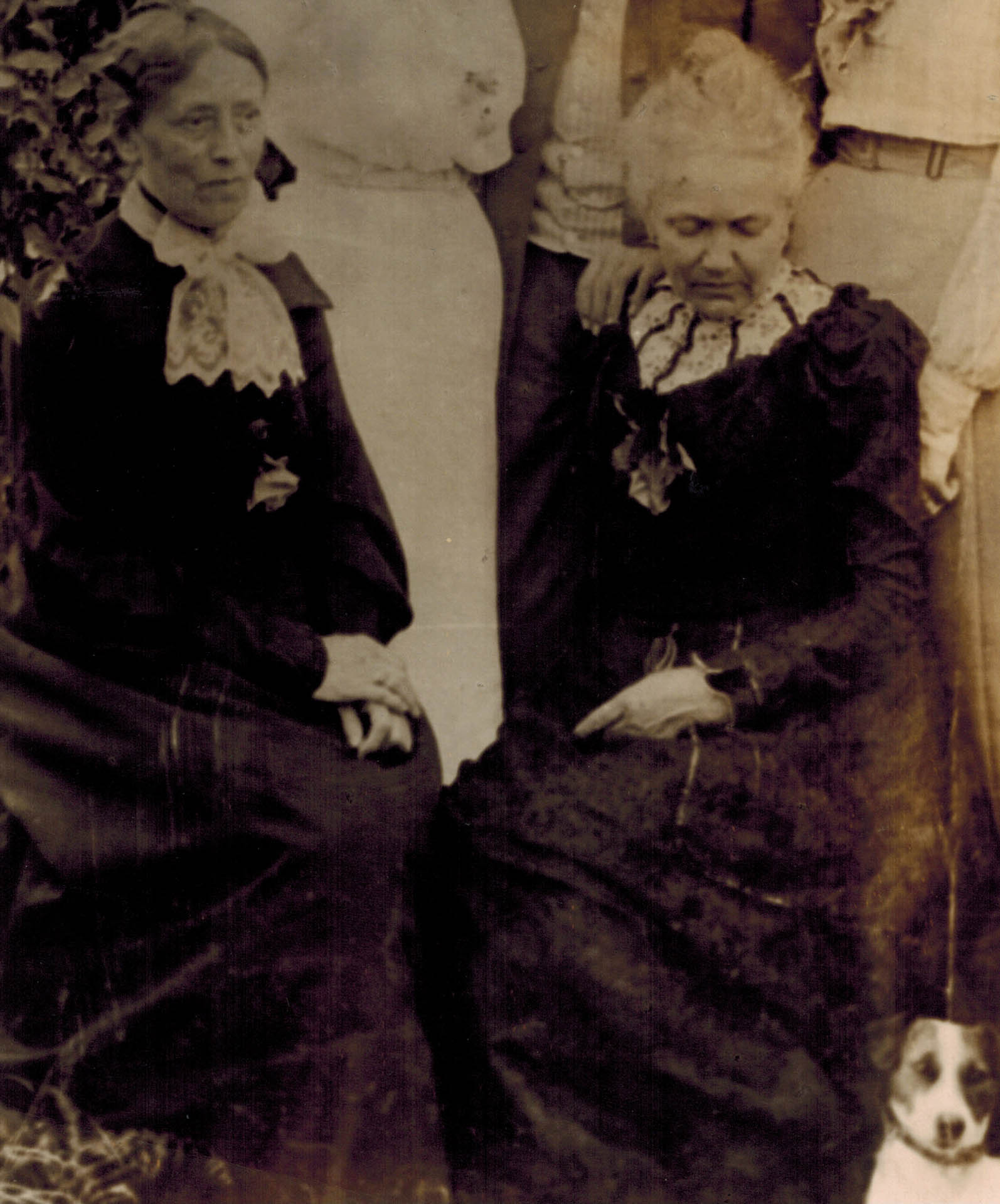
Adèle with her younger sister Marie in 1890

Koekkoek married the widower of her sister Betsie in 1880 and died in Koblenz.

Her sisters were:

1. Elise Therese Koekkoek (1834 – 1835), died in infancy
2. Jeanette Augustine (Annette) Koekkoek (1836 – 1915), married in 1867
3. Anna Elisabeth (Betsie) Koekkoek (1837 – 1878), married in 1866 to Hugo Meyer, stationmaster in Koblenz
4. Marie Louise (Marie) Koekkoek (1840 – 1910), the first to marry in 1859, she also became a painter

== See also ==
- Koekkoek family
