= Veretennikov =

Veretennikov (Russian: Веретенников) is a Russian masculine surname, its feminine counterpart is Veretennikova. The word may refer to

- Irina Veretennicoff (born 1944), Belgian physicist
- Oleg Veretennikov (born 1970), Russian football player and coach
