= Dilip Kondepudi =

Indian scientist

- Born: 1952 (age 73–74); India
- Citizenship: India, United States
- Education: University of Madras
- Scientific career
- Workplaces: Wake Forest University

Dilip Kumar Kondepudi (born 1952) is an Indian scientist and professor of physical chemistry at the Wake Forest University, known for his work on chiral biomolecules.

== Biography ==
In 1971 he completed his bachelor's degree at the University of Madras, received his PhD in physics in 1973 from the Indian Institute of Technology in Bombay, and defended his doctorate in physics on the topic "The influence of external fields on non-equilibrium systems" under the guidance of Nobel laureate I. R. Prigogine in 1979 at the University of Texas at Austin. It is considered the first to introduce the term "Gibbs energy flow" into scientific circulation. He is a Professor Emeritus at Wake Forest University.

== Publications ==
- Prigogine I. R., Kondepudi D. Modern thermodynamics — from thermal engines to dissipative structures. (Translated by Yulyi Danilov, Viacheslav Belyi, edited by Evgeny Ageev). Mir Publishers, 2002. ISBN 5-03-003538-9.

== Links ==
- Dilip Kondepudi short biography
- Dilip Kondepudi at WorldCat
