= Alexander Joseph Daiwaille =

Dutch painter

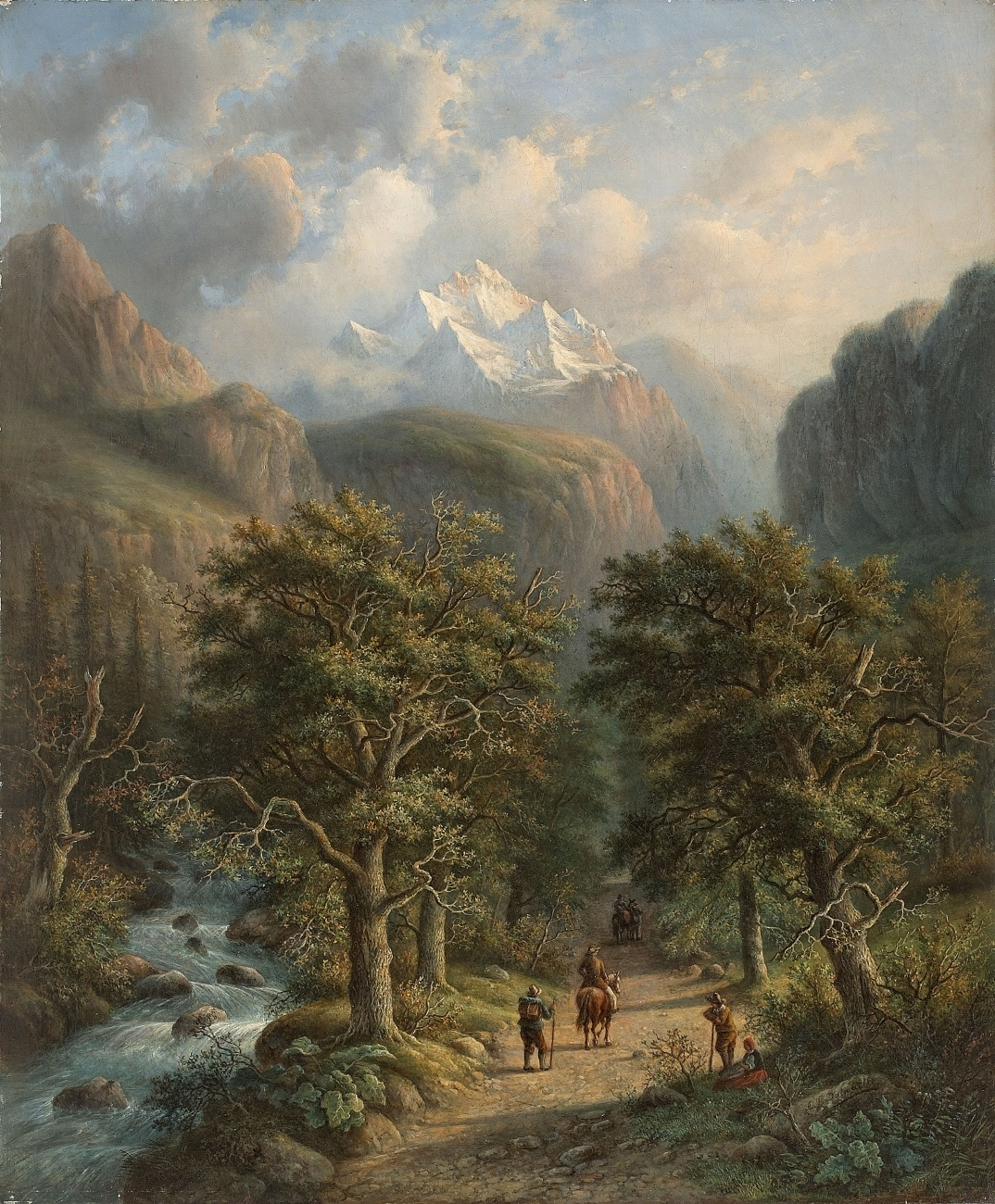
Landscape in the mountains by Alexander Joseph Daiwaille

Alexander Joseph Daiwaille (21 January 1818 – 1888) was a Dutch portrait painter.

Daiwaille was born at Amsterdam, and his father was the painter Jean Augustin Daiwaille. Alexander specialized in painting portraits, like his father, although he later in life painted landscapes. He traveled and worked all around the Netherlands and Germany, including Hilversum (1833-1834), Kleve (1834-1835), Nijmegen (1835-1836), The Hague (1836-1839), and back to Kleve (1840-1848), where he worked with his brother-in-law the landscape painter Barend Cornelis Koekkoek. Daiwaille then moved and settled in Brussels where he lived until his death in 1888.
