= International Association of Judicial Independence and World Peace =

The International Association of Judicial Independence and World Peace is a non-profit organization that promotes judicial independence in national court systems around the world. Judicial independence allows court systems to enforce the rule of law without interference by political or other governmental authorities.

== History ==
The association began in the 1980s. It conducted international projects and adopted international standards on judicial independence. The association promoted the New Delhi Minimum Code of Judicial Independence, adopted in cooperation with the International Bar Association in 1982; the Montreal Declaration on the independence of justice adopted in cooperation with The World Association of Justice in 1983; and The Mount Scopus Standards of Judicial Independence in 2008.

== Aims ==
- To promote the principle of judicial independence as a central foundation of democracy and peace, domestic and international
- To strive to encourage and support the building of culture of judicial independence
- To draft international standards of judicial independence and to revise them from time to time, based on the work and deliberations of an international team of jurists
- To conduct research projects on judicial independence and world peace
- To promote the ideals of peace, democracy, freedom and liberty by strengthening and maintaining judicial independence in all its aspects
- To help judges, judiciaries and jurists when they face threats or challenges to judicial independence
- To conduct conferences on judicial independence
- To initiate educational projects promoting judicial independence
- To follow up challenges or threats to judicial independence or practices adversely affecting judicial independence
- To support a culture of peace in all its aspects

== Main activities ==
1980-82: The members of the Association developed The Code of Minimum Standards of Judicial Independence that were adopted in New Delhi, under the framework of the International Bar Association. This was done in conferences in Berlin, Lisbon, Jerusalem and New Delhi.

1983: The members took part in drafting the Montreal Universal Declaration on the Independence of Justice.

1985: The works of the project conducted during 1980-1985 were published in Prof. Shimon Shetreet and Chief Justice Jules Deschênes, ed., Judicial independence: The contemporary debate.

1986: General Report on human rights was presented at the 12th Congress of Comparative Law, Sydney, Melbourne, Australia.

1991: The major report on "Independence and Responsibility of Judges and Lawyers" was presented in the International Congress of the World Association on Procedural Law, Coimbra - Lisbon, Portugal.

2000: The members of the Association contributed to the study of the Discretionary Power of the Judge, in the 50th Anniversary of the International Association of Procedural Law, University of Ghent.

1999-2009: Members of the Association took part in the Culture of Peace Project and in the Religions for Peace Organization International (RPO International) and organized conferences around the world.

2007-2012: Revision during series of conferences in Jerusalem 2007, Vadouz 2007, Jerusalem 2008, Kraków 2008, Cambridge 2009, Utah 2010, Vienna 2011, Hong Kong 2012 and Ghent 2012 of the 1982 New-Delhi Minimum Standards of Judicial Independence which was concluded in the Mt. Scopus International Standards on Judicial Independence.

== Officers and advisory board ==
The members of the Association are distinguished jurists and scholars from all around the world.

=== Officers ===
- President - Prof. Shimon Shetreet
- Vice President - Prof. Daniel Thurer
- Vice President - Adv. Markus BuechelDeceased 9 July 2013
- Vice President - Prof. Marcel Storme
- Secretary and Treasurer - Adv. Gian Andrea Danuser
- Auditor - Prof. Heinz C. Hoefer - Liechtenstein

=== Advisory board ===
==== Co-Chairs ====
- Professor Christopher Forsyth, University of Cambridge
- Professor Marcel Storme, University of Ghent

==== Vice Chair ====
- K. K. Venugopal, Senior Advocate, Supreme Court India

==== Members ====
- Advocate Markus Buechel, Senior Advocate, Liechtenstein
- Professor Anton Cooray, City University of Hong Kong
- Professor Maimon Schwartzschild, University of San Diego
- Professor Dr. Fryderyk Zoll, Jagiellonski University and University of Osnabruck
- Professor Wayne McCormack, The University of Utah
- Professor Dr. Walter Rechberger, University of Vienna

== Conferences ==
The Association and its members organized numerous conferences around the world. In the last decade, the Association organized conferences in Ghent, Belgium (October 2012), Hong Kong City, Hong Kong (March 2012), Vienna, Austria (2011), Salt Lake City, USA (2010), Cambridge, UK (2009), Kraków, Poland (November 2008), Jerusalem, Israel (March 2008), Vaduz, Lichtenstein (December 2007) and Jerusalem, Israel (June 2007).

One conference was held at the University of San Diego in August 2013, and focused on Judicial Independence World Peace and the Rule of Law The last conference was held in Moscow (May 29 - June 1, 2014), organised by Dmitry Magonya, Dmitry Maleshin and Irina Reshetnikova.

== The New Delhi Code of Minimum Standards of Judicial Independence ==
The 1982 New Delhi Code provided for necessary safeguards of judicial independence on the following aspects:

- Personal and Substantive Independence
- Judicial Conduct
- Collective Independence
- Internal Independence
- Judges and the Executive
- Security of Judicial Tenure
- The Legislature and Judges
- Standards of Judicial Selection

== Mount Scopus International Standards ==
The 2008 Mount Scopus International Standards emphasized the importance of maintaining constitutional safeguards of judicial Independence and securing judicial independence from numerous aspects including: collective independence of the judiciary, internal independence of the judge vis-a-vi his colleagues and his administrative superiors, the significance of insuring a reflective judiciary, one that reflects all sectors of society and the importance of providing educate resources for the judiciary to perform its functions, and the total separation of powers between judicial functions and executive responsibility.

== Publications ==
- Shimon Shetreet and Jules Deschenes, Judicial Independence: The Contemporary Debate (1985 Martinus Nijhoff).
- Shimon Shetreet and Christopher Forsyth, The Culture of Judicial Independence: Conceptual Foundations and Practical Challenges.
