= Viacheslav Belyi =

Russian scientist (1945–2020)

- Born: 8 August 1945; Termez, Uzbekistan
- Died: 20 May 2020 (aged 74); Troitsk Moscow, Russian Federation
- Education: Moscow State University
- Scientific career
- Fields: Physics; Thermodynamics
- Workplaces: IZMIRAN, Russian Federation; Universite Libre de Bruxelles
- Doctoral advisor: Yuri Klimontovich

Viachelav V. Belyi, also referred to as Slava Belyi (1 August 1945 – 20 May 2020) was a Russian scientist who specialised in physics-thermodynamics, Laureate of a scientist Prize of the Russian Federation (1991, together with Irina Veretennikoff and Yuri Klimontovich), junior, then senior and finally chief scientist at IZMIRAN (1971–2020), collaborator of Nobel prize Laureate Ilya Prigogine in 1980s and 1990s with an external affiliation to the Laboratoire de physique des plasmas at the ULB (Brussels, Belgium).

== Biography ==
Born in Termez, Uzbekistan, a town bordering Afghanistan, his father originated from eastern Ukraine, current area of Dnipro and his mother's origins were from Central Russia. At the age of 17 he moved to Moscow to study at the Moscow State University. He married there Ludmila Galakhmatova (b. 1947), a daughter of an industrialist from Urals, Nizhnyi Tagil. After their wedding in 1972, they moved to Troitsk, a scientific town in Moscow's neighborhood. With the marriage, he was a brother-in-law of another Russian scientist Andrey Slavnov who married Ludmila's sister. He had a daughter Anna (b. 1974) and a son Andrei (b. 1975). He died from COVID-19 pandemic on 20 May 2020.

== Academic career ==
He graduated from the Faculty of Physics, Moscow State University in 1969. Then he obtained a degree of candidate of science in 1971 and received a title of a doctor of science in 1988. Since 1971 he worked in IZMIRAN and specialised in kinetic theory quantum phenomena in plasma (see publications list below).

Since 1982. he maintained professional and personal contacts with Nobel Prize in Chemistry laureate Ilya Prigogine. He received a status of a visiting researcher to Solvay Institute and Centre for Statistical Physics and Plasma at the University Libre de Bruxelles (ULB).

In 1991, together with Irina Veretennikoff and Yuri Klimontovich (his scientific supervisor) he was granted the National Scientific Prize of the Russian Federation.

In 1992, he accompanied Prigogine to visit Mikhail Gorbachev.

In 1991, 1996 and 2001, he visited French foundation for prospective research called Les Treilles Foundation for events and scientific activities.

In recent years, he worked on fluctuation-dissipative theorem for the case of an inhomogeneous plasma. In 2018 V. Belyi published an article in Scientific Reports where he did put under question earlier obtained results on Thomson theorem. The scholarly debate engendered further attention to the implications for Thomson scattering spectra for inhomogeneous plasmas.

== Publications ==
- V. V. Belyi Fluctuations out of equilibrium. Philosophical Transactions R. Soc., A 376: 20170383, 2018.· | DOI:10.1038/s41598-018-25319-6 SREP-16-46572B
- V. V. Belyi Thomson scattering in inhomogeneous plasma: The Role of the Fluctuation-Dissipation Theorem, Scientific Reports –Nature. 8:7946, 2018. · DOI:10.1098/RSTA-2017-0383
- V. V. Belyi Theory of Thomson scattering in inhomogeneous plasma, Phys Rev. E97, 053204, 2018. DOI: 10.1103/PhysRevE.97.053204
- V. V. Belyi, Derivation of model kinetic equation, Europhysics Letters, 111, 40011, 2015. DOI: 10.1209/0295-5075/111/40011
- V.V. Belyi and Yu. A. Kukharenko. Bogolyubov Kinetic Equations and Dielectric Function with Exchange Interaction. // Физика элементарных частиц и атомного ядра, Physics of Particles and Nuclei, V. 41, No.7, pp. 1001- 1003, 2010.
- V.V. Belyi On the Model Kinetic Description of Plasma and a Boltzmann gas of Hard Spheres, Journal of Statistical Mechanics: Theory and Experiment, 06, P06001, 2009.
- V.V. Belyi, Fluctuation-Dissipation Dispersion Relation and Quality Factor for Slow Processes, Phys. Rev. E, V. 69, N1, p. 017104, 2004. DOI:10.1103/PhysRevE.69.017104
- V.V. Belyi Fluctuation-Dissipation Relation for a Nonlocal Plasma, Phys. Rev. Lett., V. 88, N 25, pp. 255001-4, 2002. DOI: 10.1103/PhysRevLett.88.255001
- V.V. Belyi, Yu.A. Kukharenko, J. Wallenborn, Pair correlation function and non-linear kinetic equation for a spatially uniform polarizable non-ideal plasma. Phys. Rev. Lett., V.76. N. 19, pp. 3554–3557, 1996. DOI: 10.1103/PhysRevLett.76.3554
- V.V. Belyi, I. Paiva-Veretennicoff, Electrostatic field fluctuations and form factors in multicomponent non-equilibrium plasmas. J. of Plasma Physics, V. 42, n. 1, p. 1-21, 1990. DOI:10.1017/S0022377800014598.
- В.В. Белый, Ланжевеновские источники в гидродинамических уравнениях многокомпонентной плазмы, ЖЭТФ, Т. 96, № 5, с.1668–1673, 1989; Sov. Phys. JEPT, V. 68, n. 5, p. 963-965, 1989.
- V.V. Belyi, W. Dumoulin, I. Paiva-Veretennicoff, Anomalous transport in strongly inhomogeneous systems. I. A kinetic theory of non hydro and plasmadynamics. Phys. of Fluids, V. B1, n. 2, p. 305-316, 1989; V.V. Belyi, D. Dewulf, I. Paiva-Veretennicoff, Anomalous transport in strongly inhomogeneous systems. II. The generalized hydro-dynamic of a two-component plasma, ibid, V. B1, n. 2, p. 317-324, 1989.
