= Dmitry Maleshin =

Russian lawyer, scholar, and author

Dmitry Maleshin is a Russian lawyer, scholar and author in the field of civil procedural law, legal education. He has authored more than 80 peer reviewed articles, as well as contributing to a number of text books and other works. He is currently professor at Moscow State University and a visiting professor at Saint-Petersburg University and Higher School of Economics.

== Education, teaching and advisory work ==
Maleshin received his degrees from Moscow State University in 1999 (Equivalent of J.D), 2002 (Equivalent of Ph.D), 2011 (Doctor of Law). He is a professor of civil procedural law at Moscow State University. He has also taught and scholared at a number of universities, including:

- Higher School of Economics, professor of civil procedural law since 2014:
- Moscow State University, vice-dean of Law Faculty in 2003-2013;
- Tyumen State University, advisor of the Law Faculty since 2014;
- Harvard Law School, visiting scholar in 2008;
- Yale Law School, visiting scholar in 2004.

In 2013 Maleshin participated in the Dean's elections at the Law Faculty of Moscow State University and got a majority vote, but the elections were declared invalid. That fact was highly illuminated by Russian mass-media: Kommersant, TVrain, and Izvestia.

== Academic journals ==
He is the editor-in-chief of the

- Russian Law Journal
- BRICS Law Journal

Member of the editorial boards of the following academic journals:

- Civil Procedure Review
- Herald of Civil Procedure
- University of Bologna Law Review (general student-edited law journal)

== Membership ==
He has served as a member on a wide variety of international and Russian working groups, committees and association including:

- International Association of Procedural Law, member of the Council since 2007:
- International Law Association, member of the International Civil Litigation Committee, 2006-2012:
- International Association of Judicial Independence and World Peace, member since 2013.
- Academic Council of the Moscow State University Law Faculty since 2003
- Russian Association of Legal Education, member of the Council since 2008
- Association of lawyers of Russia, Executive of the Moscow regional office in 2008-2012

== International projects ==
Selected international events organised by Dmitry Maleshin:

- First Siberian Legal Forum, "Specialisation of Judges and Courts" Tyumen city, October 17–18, 2014
- Second Siberian Legal Forum, "Administrative Justice: Comparative and Russian Contexts” Tyumen city, September 29–30, 2016

Participated in the following international research projects:

- Funding and Costs in Civil Litigation, organised by University of Oxford Centre for Socio-Legal Studies

== Selected publications ==
- Editorial. Civil Procedure in Cross-Cultural Dialogue: Eurasia Context
- Russian Style of Civil Procedure
- Some Cultural Characteristics of the New Russian Code of Civil Procedure of 2002
- The Crisis of Russian Legal Education in Comparative Perspective
- Civil Procedure in Russia, Third edition
