= Dirk Fransaer =

Dirk Jozef Alfons Fransaer (born 9 August 1958 in Dendermonde) is a Belgian engineer and director of the Flemish Institute for Technological Research in Mol, Belgium.

He graduated as a civil engineer at the University of Ghent (Ghent) in 1980 and as biomedical engineer at the Katholieke Universiteit Leuven (Leuven) in 1985.

== Honours ==
- 2010: Member of the Royal Flemish Academy of Belgium for Science and the Arts
- 2012: Commander in the Order of Leopold.
- 2014: Fray International Sustainability Award, SIPS 2014
