= Jean Augustin Daiwaille =

Dutch portrait painter and lithographer

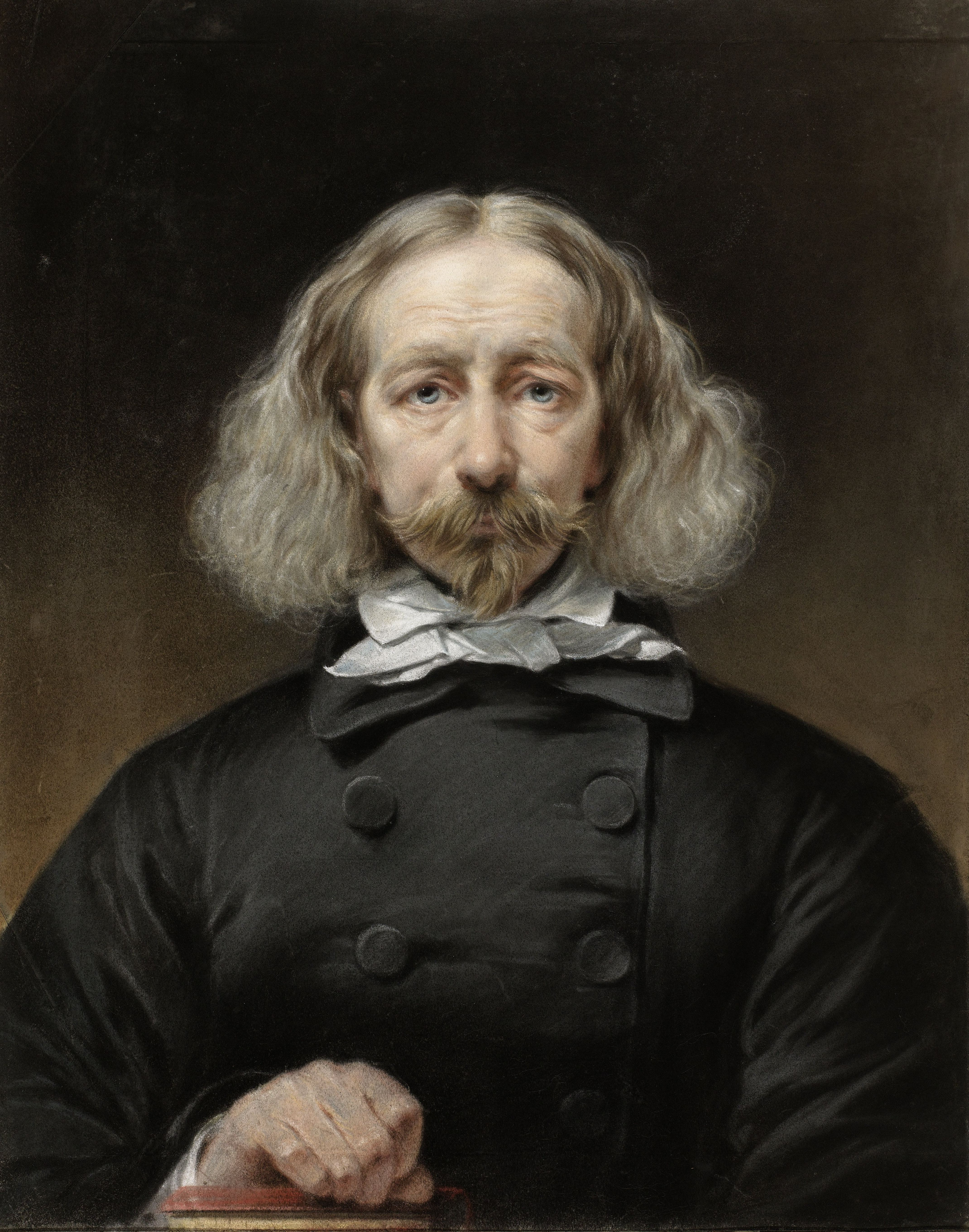
Self portrait, pastel on parchment, Rijksmuseum Amsterdam

Jean Augustin Daiwaille (6 August 1786 – 11 April 1850) was a Dutch portrait painter and lithographer.

== Life ==
Daiwaille was born in Cologne, Holy Roman Empire and went to Amsterdam, The Netherlands as a young man, where he studied under Adriaan de Lelie. He was director of the Rijksakademie from 1820 to 1826. After that time, he resided at Rotterdam, where he was very successful in painting portraits, and where he died in 1850. There is by him one etching, which is scarce.

He was an early exponent of lithography during the 1820s, overseeing the installation of a lithographic press at the new Koninklijke Academie, and instructing the students on the use of the technique. He established his own lithographic business in 1826, producing reproductions of his own paintings, and collaborating with other artists such as Barend Cornelis Koekkoek to make copies of their work.

His daughter, Elise Thérèse, married one of his pupils, the painter Barend Cornelis Koekkoek. His son, Alexander Joseph Daiwaille, also became a painter.

== Gallery ==
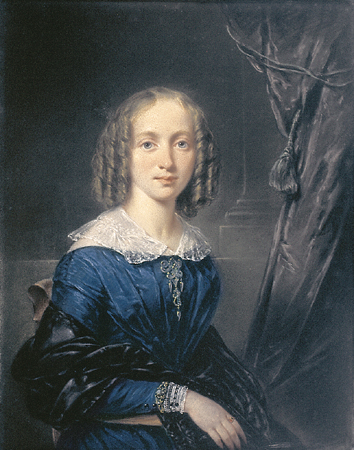
Portrait of daughter Elise Thérèse Daiwaille, circa 1835, B.C. Koekkoek-Haus Kleve

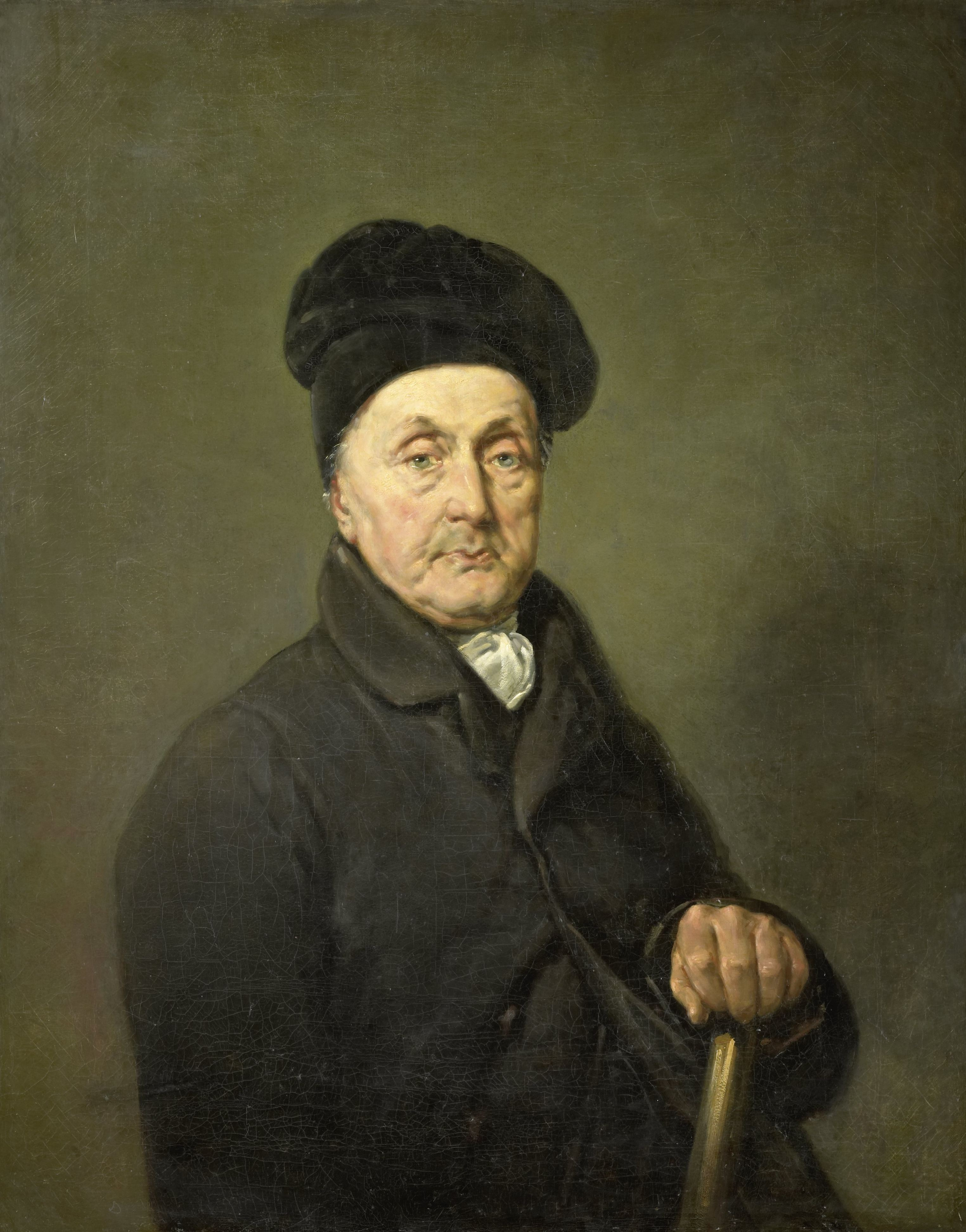
Portrait of Hendrik van Demmeltraadt, between 1810 and 1819, Rijksmuseum Amsterdam

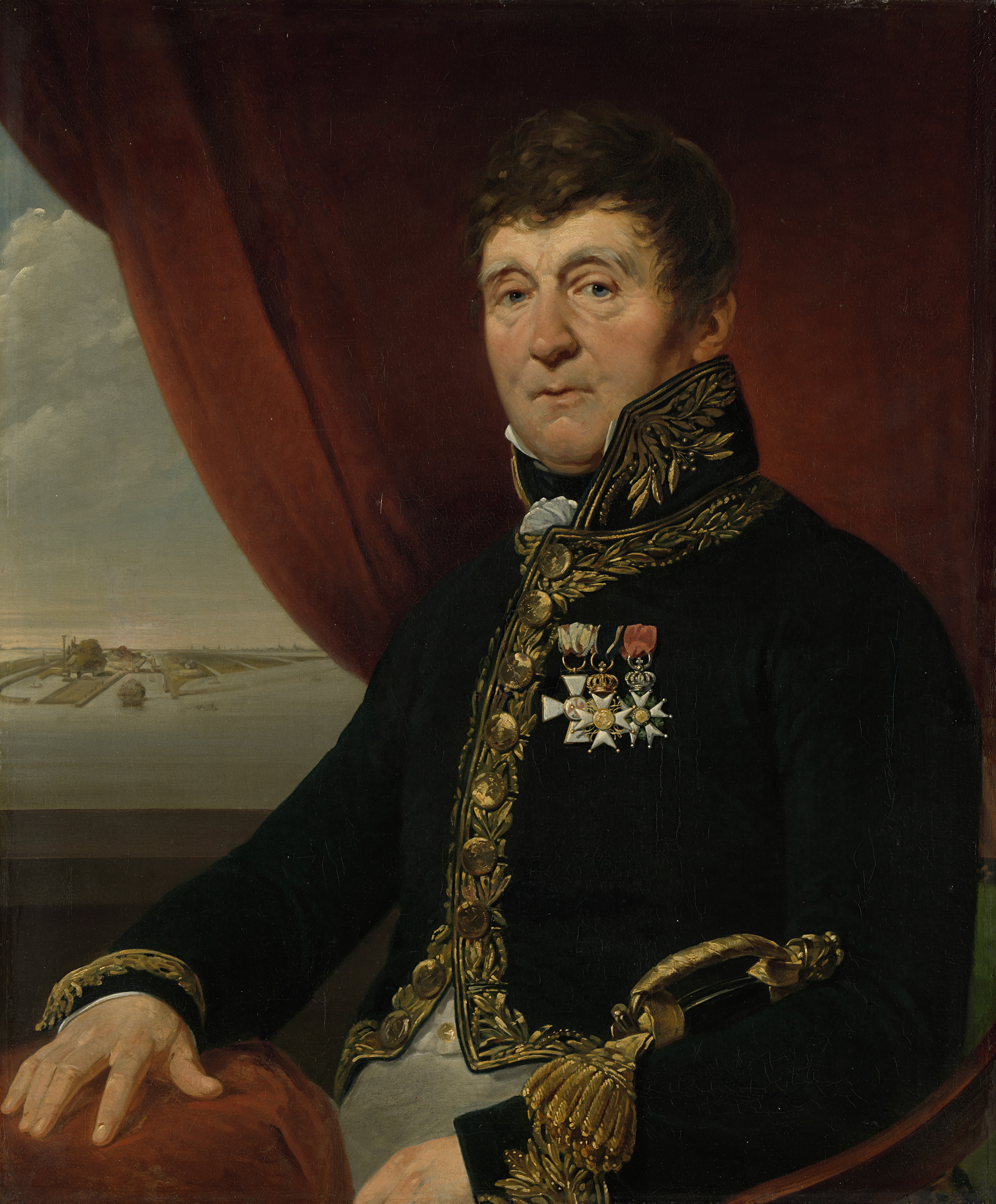
Portrait of Jan Blanken Junior, between 1820 and 1838, Rijksmuseum Amsterdam

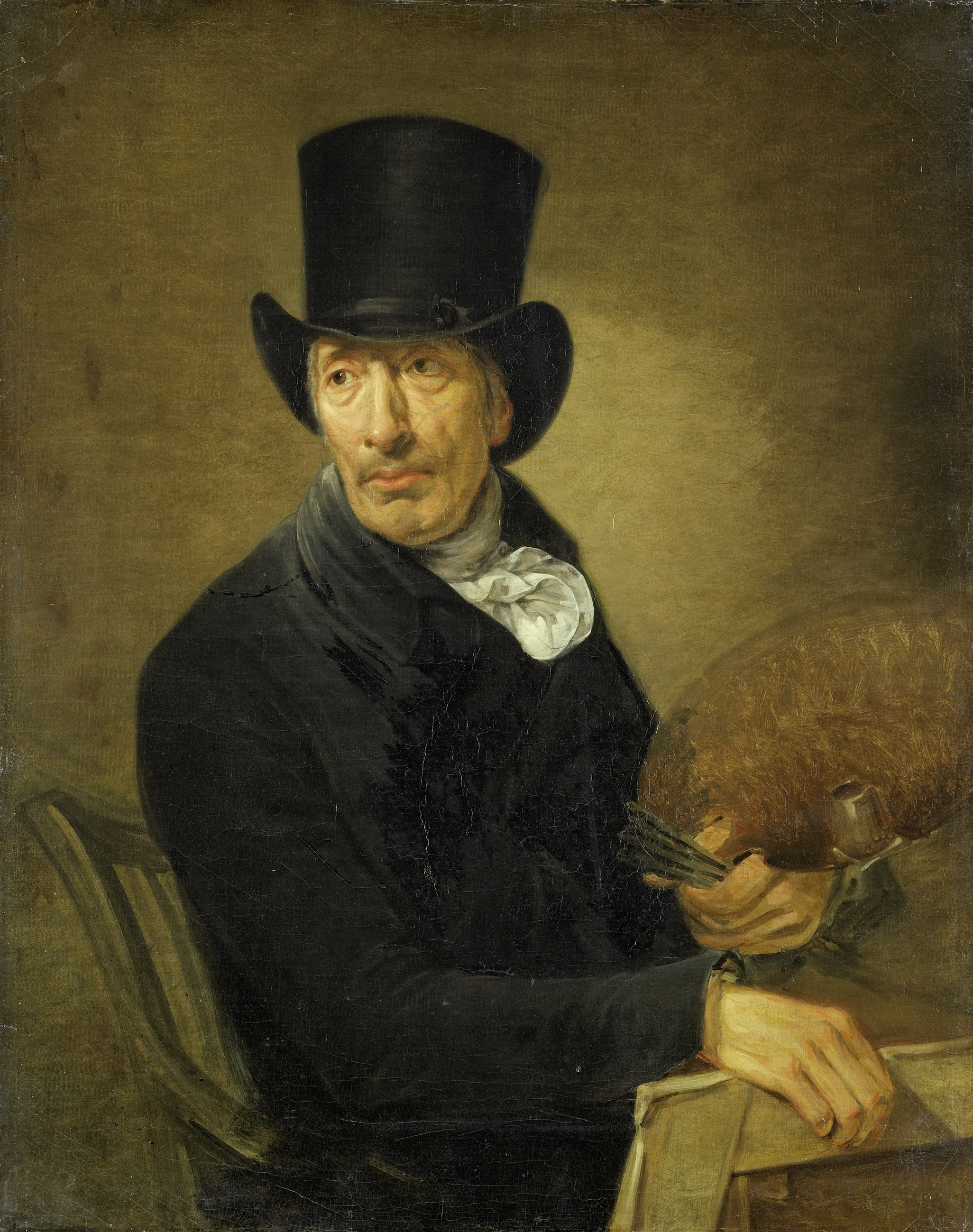
Portrait of Pieter Pietersz Barbiers, between 1810 and 1830, Rijksmuseum Amsterdam

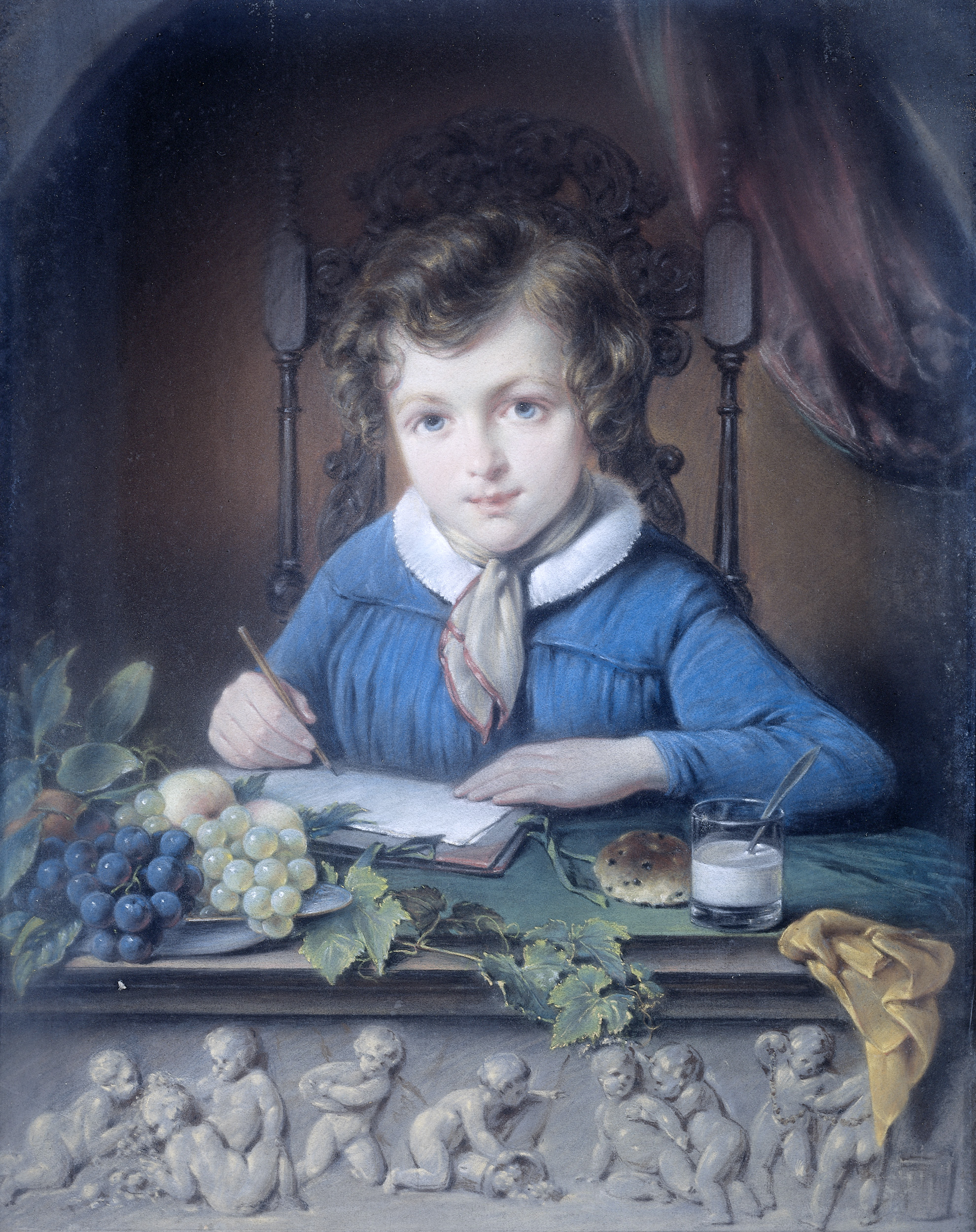
Portrait of a youth, between 1830 and 1850, Rijksmuseum Amsterdam

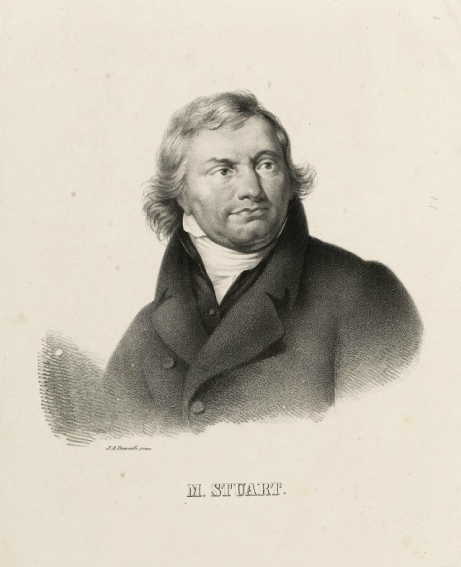
Portrait of Martinus Stuart, circa 1790
