= Elise Thérèse Koekkoek-Daiwaille =

Dutch painter

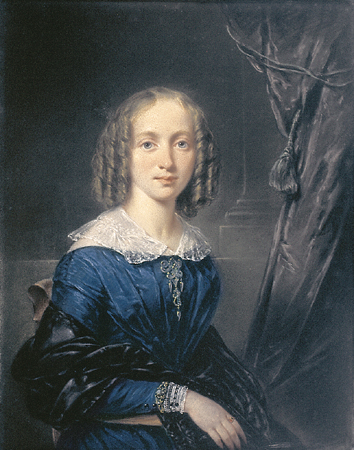
- Portrait by her father
- Born: Elise Thérèse Daiwaille; 5 May 1814
- Died: 2 June 1881 (aged 67)
- Spouse: Barend Cornelis Koekkoek
- Children: 5 daughters (including Adèle and Marie Louise)
- Parent: Jean Augustin Daiwaille

Elise Thérèse Koekkoek-Daiwaille (5 May 1814 – 2 June 1881) was a painter and lithographer from the Netherlands. She was born in Amsterdam and was taught to paint by her father Jean Augustin Daiwaille. She married the landscape painter Barend Cornelis Koekkoek in 1833. They had five daughters, of whom Adèle and Marie Louise also became painters. They ran a school for artists in Kleve, Germany and their former home is now the museum B.C. Koekkoek-Haus. She is principally known for her Principes des fleurs et des fruits, an album with six lithograph's with fruit and flower still lifes.

== See also ==
- Koekkoek family
