= Géry van Outryve d'Ydewalle =

Géry, ridder van Outryve d'Ydewalle (Brugge, 18 December 1946 - 19 August 2025) was a Belgian scientist. He was professor in psychology with memory and cognition as main topics. He was head of the Laboratory of experimental psychology at the Katholieke Universiteit Leuven (Leuven) until 2012. He worked for some time with Professor William Kaye Estes at Rockefeller University (N.Y.) and lectured at the London School of Economics. In 1992, he was awarded the Francqui Prize on Human Sciences and was elected member of the Royal Flemish Academy of Belgium for Science and the Arts. From 1980 till 2004 he was successively member, Deputy Secretary-General (1984), Secretary-General (1992) and President (1996) of the International Union of Psychological Science. He has been elected as permanent secretary of the Royal Flemish Academy in succession to Professor Baron Niceas Schamp, as of 1 September 2010. Géry van Outryve d'Ydewalle has been active as a musician (traverso) in several chamber orchestras. He is the fifth of six children of Baron Pierre van Outryve d'Ydewalle, governor of West-Flanders from 1944 to 1979.

His ancestor, Emmanuel-Louis van Outryve d'Ydewalle (originally van Outryve; 1745–1827) was created a ridder/("knight") 21 September 1771;, a hereditary title in male line. Géry van Outryve d'Ydewalle's father, Pierre, was elevated to the rank of Baron in 1982.

== Publications ==
Scientific papers

- Van Damme, I., d'Ydewalle, G. (2010). Incidental versus intentional encoding in the Deese-Roediger-McDermott paradigm: Does amnesic patients' implicit false memory depend on conscious activation of the lure?. Journal of Clinical and Experimental Neuropsychology, 32 (5), 536–554.
- Van Damme, I., Menten, J., d'Ydewalle, G. (2010). The effect of articulatory suppression on implicit and explicit false memory in the DRM paradigm. Memory.
- Van Damme, I., d'Ydewalle, G. (2010). Confabulation versus experimentally induced false memories in Korsakoff patients. Journal of Neuropsychology, 4, 211–230.
- Van Damme, I., d'Ydewalle, G. (2009). Memory loss versus memory distortion: The role of encoding and retrieval deficits in Korsakoff patients' false memories. Memory, 17 (4), 349–366.
- Van Damme, I., d'Ydewalle, G. (2009). Implicit false memory in the DRM paradigm: Effects of amnesia, encoding instructions, and encoding duration. Neuropsychology, 23 (5), 635–648.
- Van Damme, I., d'Ydewalle, G. (2008). A cognitive neuropsychological approach to false memory: Korsakoff patients and the DRM paradigm. Netherlands Journal of Psychology, 64 (3), 96–111.
- Van Damme, I., d'Ydewalle, G. (2008). Elaborative processing in the Korsakoff syndrome: Context versus habit. Brain and cognition, 67 (2), 212–224.
- Sevenants, A., Schroyens, W., Dieussaert, K., Schaeken, W., d'Ydewalle, G. (2008). Truth table tasks: The relevance of irrelevant. Thinking & reasoning, 14 (4), 409–433.
- Germeys, F., d'Ydewalle, G. (2007). The psychology of film: perceiving beyond the cut. Psychological research, 71 (4), 458–466.
- d'Ydewalle, G., De Bruycker, W. (2007). Eye movements of children and adults while reading television subtitles. European psychologist : the journal for psychology in Europe, 12, 196–205.
- d'Ydewalle, G., Van Damme, I. (2007). Memory and the Korsakoff syndrome: Not remembering what is remembered. Neuropsychologia, 45 (5), 905–920.
- Van Lommel, S., Laenen, A., d'Ydewalle, G. (2006). Foreign-grammar acquisition while watching subtitled television programmes. British journal of educational psychology, 76, 243–258.
- Sevenants, A., d'Ydewalle, G. (2006). Does it matter to be pictured from below?. Psychologica Belgica, 46 (3), 199–210.
- Verschueren, N., Schaeken, W., d'Ydewalle, G. (2005). Everyday conditional reasoning: a working memory-dependent trade-off between counterexample and likelihood use. Memory and cognition, 33, 107–119.
- De Bruycker, W., d'Ydewalle, G., Orban, G. (2005). Brain regions associated with retention and retrieval in event-based prospective memory: evidence from functional magnetic resonance imaging. Journal of the international neuropsychological society/JINS, 11 (Suppl.2), 68.
- Verschueren, N., Schaeken, W., d'Ydewalle, G. (2005). A dual process specification of causal conditional reasoning. Thinking and reasoning, 11, 239–278.
- De Neys, W., Schaeken, W., d'Ydewalle, G. (2005). Working memory and everyday conditional reasoning: retrieval and inhibition of stored counterexamples. Thinking and reasoning, 11, 349–381.
- De Neys, W., Schaeken, W., d'Ydewalle, G. (2005). Working memory and counterexample retrieval for causal conditionals. Thinking and reasoning, 11, 123–150.
- Verschueren, N., Schaeken, W., Schroyens, W., d'Ydewalle, G. (2004). The interpretation of the concepts 'necessity' and 'sufficiency' in forward unicausal relations. Current Psychology Letters, 14 (3).
- Verschueren, N., Schaeken, W., De Neys, W., d'Ydewalle, G. (2004). The difference between generating counterexamples and using them during reasoning. Quarterly journal of experimental psychology, 57A, 1285–1308. De Neys, W., d'Ydewalle, G. (2003). Causal conditional reasoning and strength of association: the disabling condition case. The European journal of cognitive psychology, 15 (2), 161–176.
- van Diepen, P., d'Ydewalle, G. (2003). Early peripheral and foveal processing in fixations during scene perception. Visual cognition, 10 (1), 79–100.
- De Neys, W., Schaeken, W., d'Ydewalle, G. (2003). Inference suppression and semantic memory retrieval: every counterexample counts. Memory and cognition, 31 (4), 581–595.
- De Neys, W., Schaeken, W., d'Ydewalle, G. (2002). Causal conditional reasoning and semantic memory retrieval: a test of the semantic memory framework. Memory & Cognition, 30, 908–920.
- Dieussaert, K., Schaeken, W., d'Ydewalle, G. (2002). The relative contribution of content and context factors on the interpretation of conditionals. Experimental Psychology, 49 (3), 181–195.
- Dieussaert, K., Schaeken, W., d'Ydewalle, G. (2002). The impact of the nature of disabling conditions on the reasoning process. Current psychology letters: behaviour, brain and cognition, 3, 87–103.
- De Neys, W., d'Ydewalle, G., Schaeken, W., Vos, G. (2002). A Dutch, computerized, and group administrable adaptation of the operation span test. Psychologica Belgica, 42 (3), 177–190.
- Schroyens, W., Schaeken, W., d'Ydewalle, G. (2001). The processing of negations in conditional reasoning: a meta-analytic case study in mental model and/or mental logic theory. Thinking and reasoning, 7, 121–172.
- Germeys, F., d'Ydewalle, G. (2001). Revisiting scene primes for object locations. Quarterly journal of experimental psychology, 54A, 683–693.
- d'Ydewalle, G., Bouckaert, D., Brunfaut, E. (2001). Age-related differences and complexity of ongoing activities in time- and event-based prospective memory. American journal of psychology, 114 (3), 411–423.
- Welkenhuysen, M., Evers-Kiebooms, G., d'Ydewalle, G. (2001). The language of uncertainty in genetic risk communication: framing and verbal versus numerical information. Patient education and counseling, 43 (2), 179–187.
- Dieussaert, K., Schaeken, W., De Neys, W., d'Ydewalle, G. (2000). Initial belief state as a predictor of belief revision. Cahiers de Psychologie Cognitive, 19 (3), 277-288A.
- d'Ydewalle, G., Denis, M. (2000). Cognitive psychology and its successful spin-offs. International Journal of Psychology, 35, 298–299.
- Schroyens, W., Verschueren, N., Schaeken, W., d'Ydewalle, G. (2000). Conditional reasoning with negations: Implicit and explicit affirmation or denial and the role of contrast classes. Thinking and reasoning, 6, 221–251.
- Dieussaert, K., Schaeken, W., Schroyens, W., d'Ydewalle, G. (2000). Strategies during complex conditional inferences. Thinking & Reasoning, 6 (2), 125–160.
- Brunfaut, E., Vanoverberghe, V., d'Ydewalle, G. (2000). Prospective remembering of Korsakoffs and alcoholics as a function, of the ongoing task. Neuropsychologia, 38 (7), 975–984.
- Lavigne, F., Vitu, F., d'Ydewalle, G. (2000). The influence of semantic context on initial eye landing sites in words.
- d'Ydewalle, G. (2000). The case against a single consciousness center: Much ado about nothing?. European Psychologist, 5, 12–13.
- Schroyens, W., Vitu, F., Brysbaert, M., d'Ydewalle, G. (1999). Eye movement control during reading: Foveal load and parafoveal processing. Quarterly journal of experimental psychology section a-human experimental psychology, 52 (4), 1021–1046.
- Van Diepen, P., Ruelens, L., d'Ydewalle, G. (1999). Brief foveal masking during scene perception. Acta Psychologica, 101 (1), 91–103.
- Schroyens, W., Schaeken, W., Verschueren, N., d'Ydewalle, G. (1999). Conditional reasoning with negations: Matching bias and implicit versus explicit affirmation or denial. Psychologica belgica, 39 (4), 235–258.
- Schroyens, W., Schaeken, W., d'Ydewalle, G. (1999). Error and bias in meta-propositional reasoning: A case of the mental model theory. Thinking and Reasoning, 5, 29–65.
- Koolstra, C., Van derVoort, T., d'Ydewalle, G. (1999). Lengthening the presentation time of subtitles on television: Effects on children's reading time and recognition. Communications, 24, 407–422.d'Ydewalle, G. (1999). The psychology of film perception. Psicologia Italiana, 17, 11–13.
- d'Ydewalle, G., Luwel, K., Brunfaut, E. (1999). The importance of on-going concurrent activities as a function of age in time- and event-based prospective memory. European journal of cognitive psychology, 11 (2), 219–237.
- d'Ydewalle, G., Van de Poel, M. (1999). Incidental foreign-language acquisition by children watching subtitled television programs. Journal of Psycholinguistic Research, 28, 227–244.
- Dieussaert, K., Schaeken, W., Schroyens, W., d'Ydewalle, G. (1999). Strategies for dealing with complex deductive problems: Combining and dividing. Psychologica belgica, 39 (4), 215–234.
- Welkenhuysen, M., Evers-Kiebooms, G., d'Ydewalle, G. (1997). Unrealistic optimism about specific genetic risks and perceived preventability. Psychologica Belgica, 37 (3), 169-181-1997.
- De Graef, P., Jolicoeur, P., d'Ydewalle, G. (1992). Introduction to the special issue on object perception and scene analysis. Canadian journal of psychology-revue canadienne de psychologie, 46 (3), 317–318.
- van Outryve d'Ydewalle, G., Praet, C., Verfaillie, K., Van Rensbergen, J. (1991). Watching subtitled television - automatic reading behavior. Communication research, 18 (5), 650–666.
- Verfaillie, K., van Outryve d'Ydewalle, G. (1991). Representational momentum and event course anticipation in the perception of implied periodical motions. Journal of experimental psychology-learning memory and cognition, 17 (2), 302–313.
- Wagemans, J., Van Gool, L., Vanden Bossche, P., d'Ydewalle, G. (1990). Orientational effects of axis and virtual lines in symmetry detection. Perception, 19, 84-84.
- Wagemans, J., Van Gool, L., Vanden Bossche, P., d'Ydewalle, G. (1990). Orientational effects in the detection of bilateral and skewed symmetry. Bulletin of the psychonomic society, 28 (510).

Books as an editor

- Progress in psychological science around the world: Volume 1: Neural, cognitive and developmental issues. (Jing, Q., Ed., Rosenzweig, M., Ed., d'Ydewalle, G., Ed., Zhang, H., Ed., Chen, H., Ed., Zhang, K., Ed.). Hove, U.K.: Psychology Press, 2006.
- Bilingualism and second language acquisition. (Morais, J., Ed., d'Ydewalle, G., Ed.). Brussels: Royal Academies for Science and the Arts of Belgium, 2006.
- d'Ydewalle, G., Psychological concepts: An international historical perspective. (Pawlik, K., Ed.). Psychology press, 2006.
- Progress in psychological science around the world: Volume 2: Social and applied issues. (Jing, Q., Ed., Rosenzweig, M., Ed., d'Ydewalle, G., Ed., Zhang, H., Ed., Chen, H., Ed., Zhang, K., Ed.). Hove, U.K.: Psychology Press, 2006.
- Cognition in human learning and motivation. (van Outryve d'Ydewalle, G., Ed., Lens, W., Ed.). Leuven & Hillsdale, NJ: Leuven University Press & Erlbaum, 1981.
- Time and the dynamic control of behavior. (De Keyser, V., Ed., d'Ydewalle, G., Ed., Vandierendonck, A., Ed.). Seattle, WA: Hogrefe & Huber, 1998.
