= Barend Cornelis Koekkoek =

Dutch painter

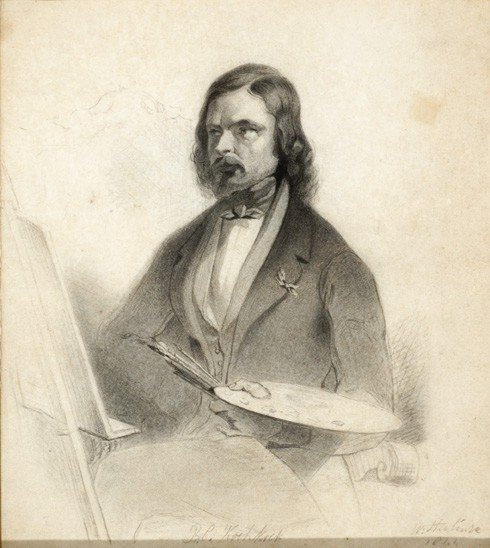
- Koekkoek (1844)
- Born: October 11, 1803; Middelburg, Netherlands
- Died: April 5, 1862 (aged 58); Cleves, Germany
- Education: Abraham Krayestein
- Known for: Landscape artist
- Spouse: Elise Thérèse Koekkoek-Daiwaille (m. 1833)

Barend Cornelis Koekkoek (October 11, 1803 – April 5, 1862) was a Dutch landscape artist and lithographer, and the most famous member of the Koekkoek family of painters.

== Biography ==
=== Early life: 1803–1824 ===
Barend Cornelis Koekkoek was born on 11 October 1803, in Middelburg, Zeeland. He was the first and eldest son of Johannes Hermanus Koekkoek‍—‌born in the province of Zeeland, to Dutch parents‍—‌and Anna van Koolwijk. Aside from Koekkoek, whose father was a Dutch renowned marine painter, from whom he received his earliest tuition, Johannes and Anna's other sons were Hermanus (the elder), Johannes (the Younger) and Marinus.

Barend grew up in an artistic environment and came to be known during his lifetime as the “Prince of Landscape Painting” and was an applauded landscapist of his time and regarded as the founding father of Dutch romantic landscape painting. The recipient of endless awards and decorations, he counted among his clients King Friedrich-Wilhelm IV of Prussia, Tsar Alexander II, and King Willem II of the Netherlands.

His brothers were both successful artists, the first as a painter of marine subjects and river scenes, the second as a landscapist. In 1817 he enrolled at the Drawing Academy of Middelburg, where he studied under Abraham Krayestein. On moving to Amsterdam in 1822, he studied for four years at the Koninklijke Academie van Beeldende Kunsten, and by 1824, at 19 years of age, he voiced his ambition to become a painter of landscapes.

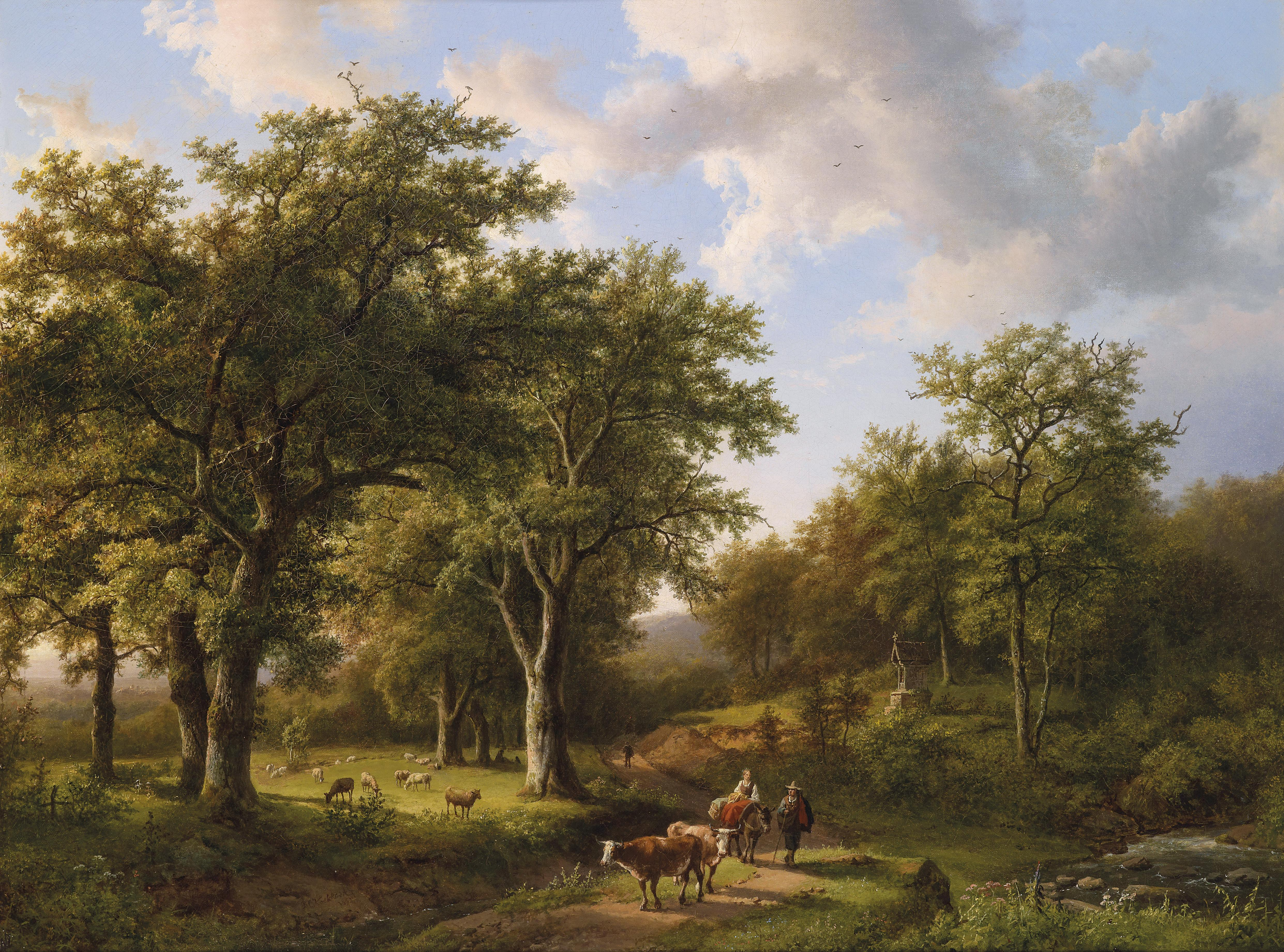
Forest Landscape with Shepherds and Cattle (1857)

He concentrated on extensive wooded landscapes in summer and winter, a theme deducted from the four season series. Like other Romantic painters such as Caspar David Friedrich, Koekkoek painted the motif of tiny figures within imposing, majestic natural environments to contrast humble humanity with the greatness of creation.

This was a popular subject matter in the Golden Age, the main source of inspiration for nineteenth-century artists. A two years stay in the rural setting of Hilversum (1826–1827), housing a colony of landscape and cattle painters, strengthened his decision. The landscapes he painted in the rural surroundings of Hilversum were received favourably. In 1829, the Amsterdam society Felix Meritis awarded one of Koekkoek's summer landscapes a gold medal. In 1833 he married Elise Thérèse Daiwaille (1814–81), the daughter of his longtime teacher and friend, Master Jean Augustin Daiwaille, with whom he had five daughters. One of them, Adèle, also became a painter.

== Career ==
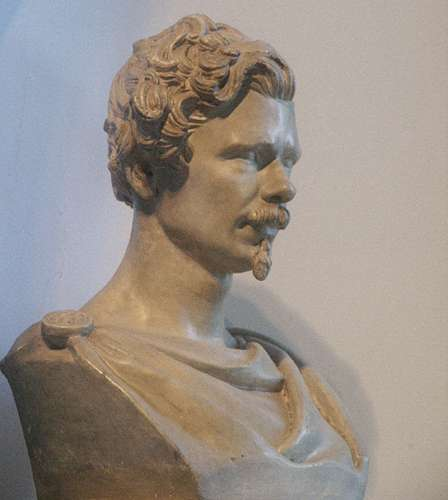
Portrait of B.C. Koekkoek

The flat Dutch countryside could not satisfy Koekkoek's romantic soul for very long. ‘Surely’, Koekkoek wrote in 1841 ‘Our fatherland boasts no rocks, waterfalls, high mountains or romantic valleys. Proud, sublime nature is not to be found in our land’. With that in mind, in the summer of 1834 he moved to the old Ducal capital of Cleves, Germany, where he found his ideal subject matter in the region of the Ahr, Ruhr and Rhine. Soon large oak trees, winding paths and panoramic views filled his paintings with an artful blend of minute detail and atmospheric mood. In Cleves, where he would spend the rest of his life, Koekkoek painted his most important landscapes, ranging from extensive river valleys to idyllic forest views dominated by one or more oaks. He often dramatized his trees as a means to emphasize man's paltriness in comparison to nature.

By 1841, Koekkoek had earned such regard from his fellow artists that he decided to publish a book of lessons for students, Herinneringen en Mededeelingen van eenen Landschapsschilder ("Recollections and Communications of a Landscape Painter"), in which he aired the view that an artist must, above all, stay true to nature through meticulous observation and rigorous draughtsmanship. This seminal work took the form of a leisurely journey along the Rhine, pointing out to the reader various qualities of nature and landscape. The same year, by popular demand from young artists eager to receive his tuition, Koekkoek founded his own drawing academy (Zeichen Collegium), and in his footsteps, many artists travelled to the former ducal residence seeking instruction from the great master at the academy, among them Frederik Marinus Kruseman, Lodewijk Johannes Kleijn, and Johann Bernard Klombeck. Closely adhering to their master's principles expressed in his writings and in his paintings, these artists collectively gave rise to the school of landscape painting referred to as 'Cleves Romanticism', blending realism with a pervading idealized atmosphere. He advised his students to study nature closely, to observe the qualities of light at dawn and at sunset and the development of storms. He also guided his students in the examination of Dutch seventeenth century masters. The 1840s-50s saw Koekkoek at the very height of his genius. In November 1859 Koekkoek suffered from a major stroke which effectively ended his career as a painter. He died April 5, 1862, in his beloved town of Cleves.

== Work ==
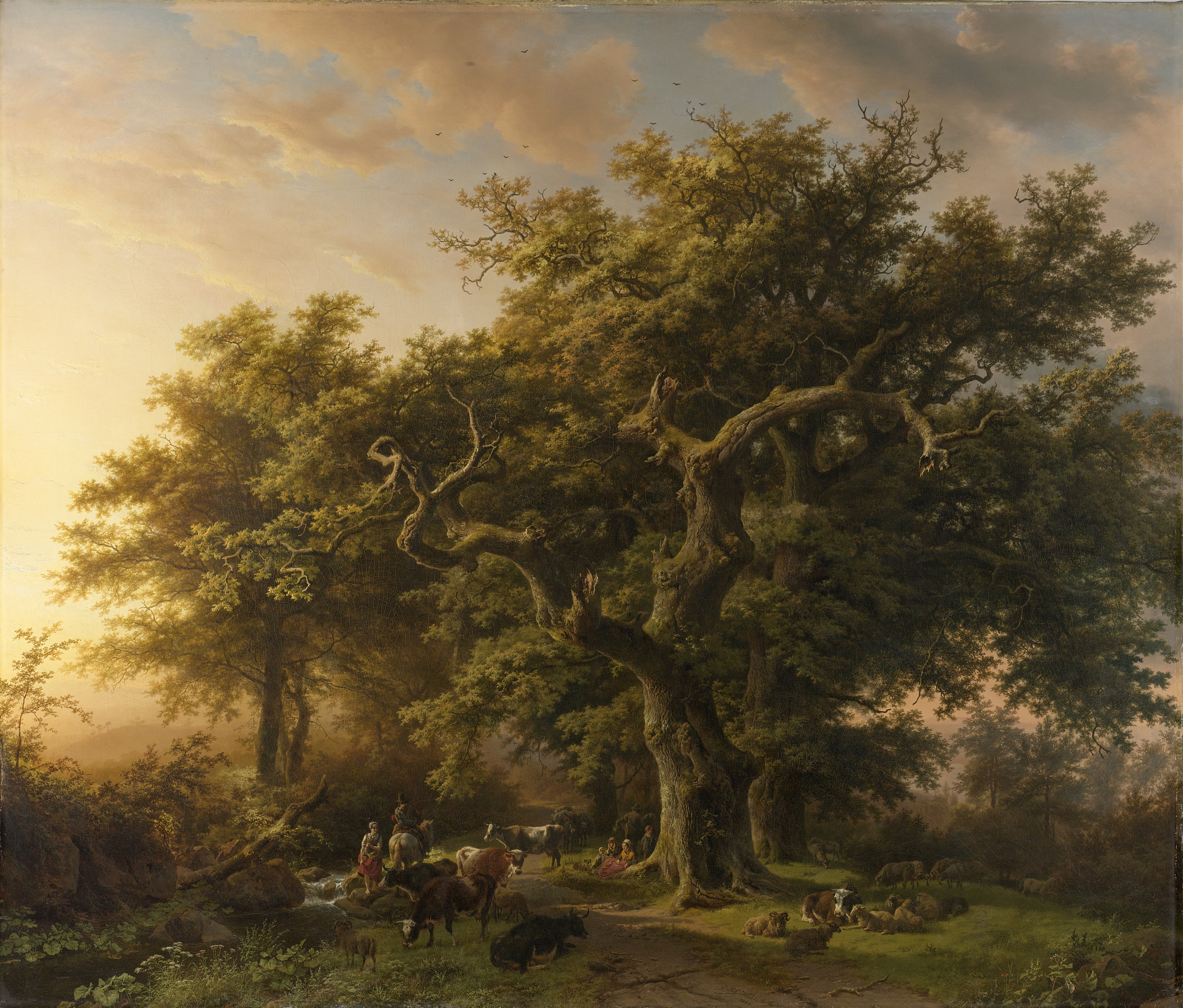
"Forest scene" (1848); Rijksmuseum, Amsterdam

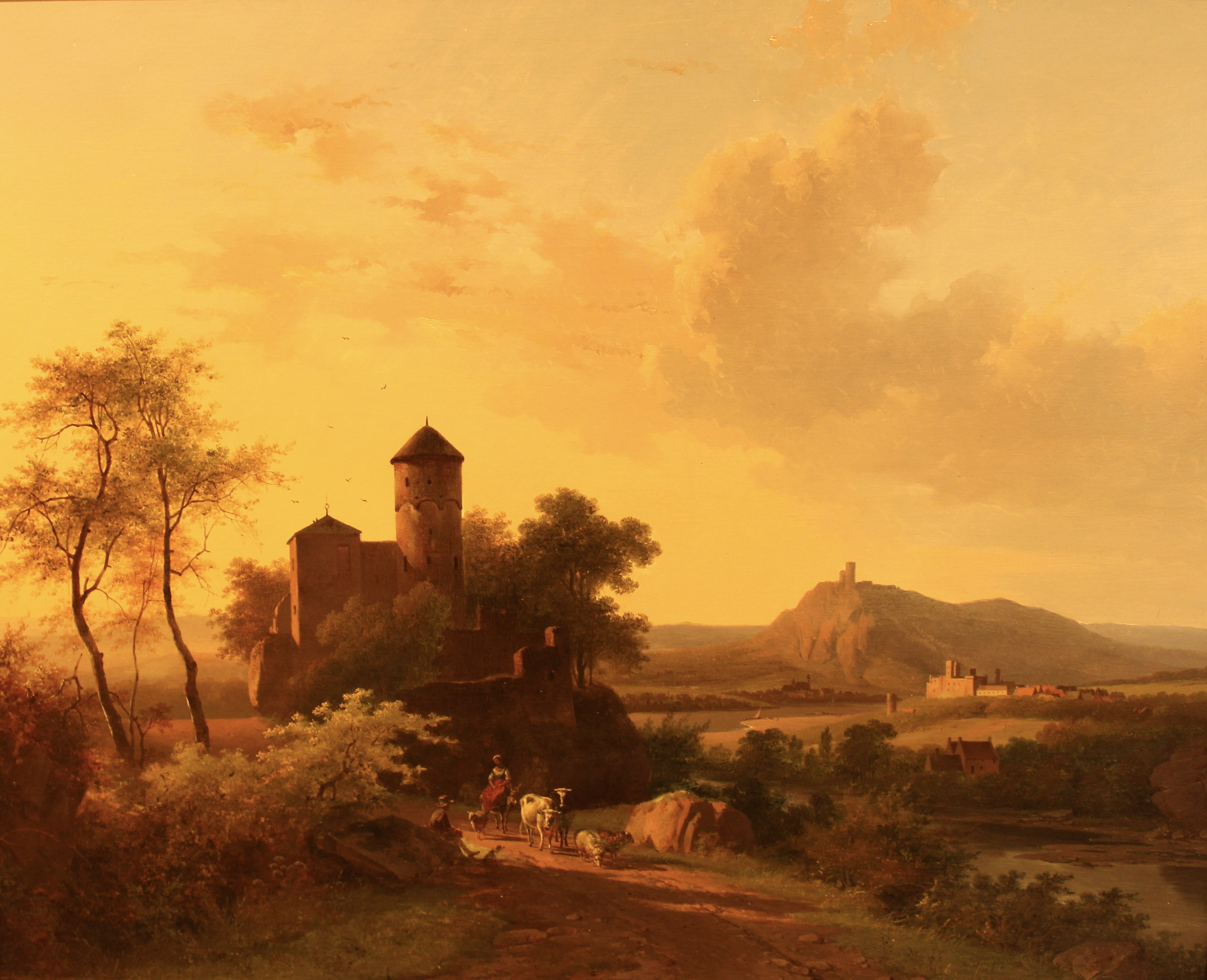
Morning in Thuringia

Koekkoek's own paintings reveal a careful study and synthesis of Dutch seventeenth-century painters. His art is firmly rooted in the great Dutch romantic tradition established by the seventeenth-century masters: Hobbema, Cuyp, Ruisdael and Wynants. The golden light and the inclusion of travellers in his work suggests Koekkoek also admired the Dutch Italianate painters of the seventeenth century, collectively known as the Bamboccianti, especially Pieter van Laer and Jan Both.

Koekkoek constructed his paintings through a combination of direct observation and idealized composition, studying both artistic theory and the natural world. In her 1973 book Dutch Painters of the Nineteenth Century, art historian G. H. Marius noted that his work is characterized by a detailed reproduction of wooded landscapes, particularly in the structure and growth of trees. Today, his paintings remain recognized for their lively compositions and nostalgic style, which draws comparison to the Dutch Golden Age. Both during his lifetime and in subsequent art history, Koekkoek has been regarded as a central figure of Dutch Romantic landscape painting.

== Haus Koekkoek, Cleves ==
Koekkoek's financial success allowed him to purchase a plot of land in downtown Cleves in 1842 and build a grand villa in italianate style over the next seven years. After his death in 1862, the house was sold and the majority of its furnishings were auctioned off in Amsterdam. In 1902 the German doctor Hans van Ackeren purchased and expanded the property, added an extension to the house and remodeled its interior in Art Nouveau style. Fortunately the house remained essentially undamaged in WW II; it was subsequently used as city-hall for several years during which time it hosted art annual exhibits by the Kleve Artist's Association. From 1960 it became the municipal museum and in 1997 it was returned to its state as an artist's residence.

Haus Koekkoek, Cleves, Germany

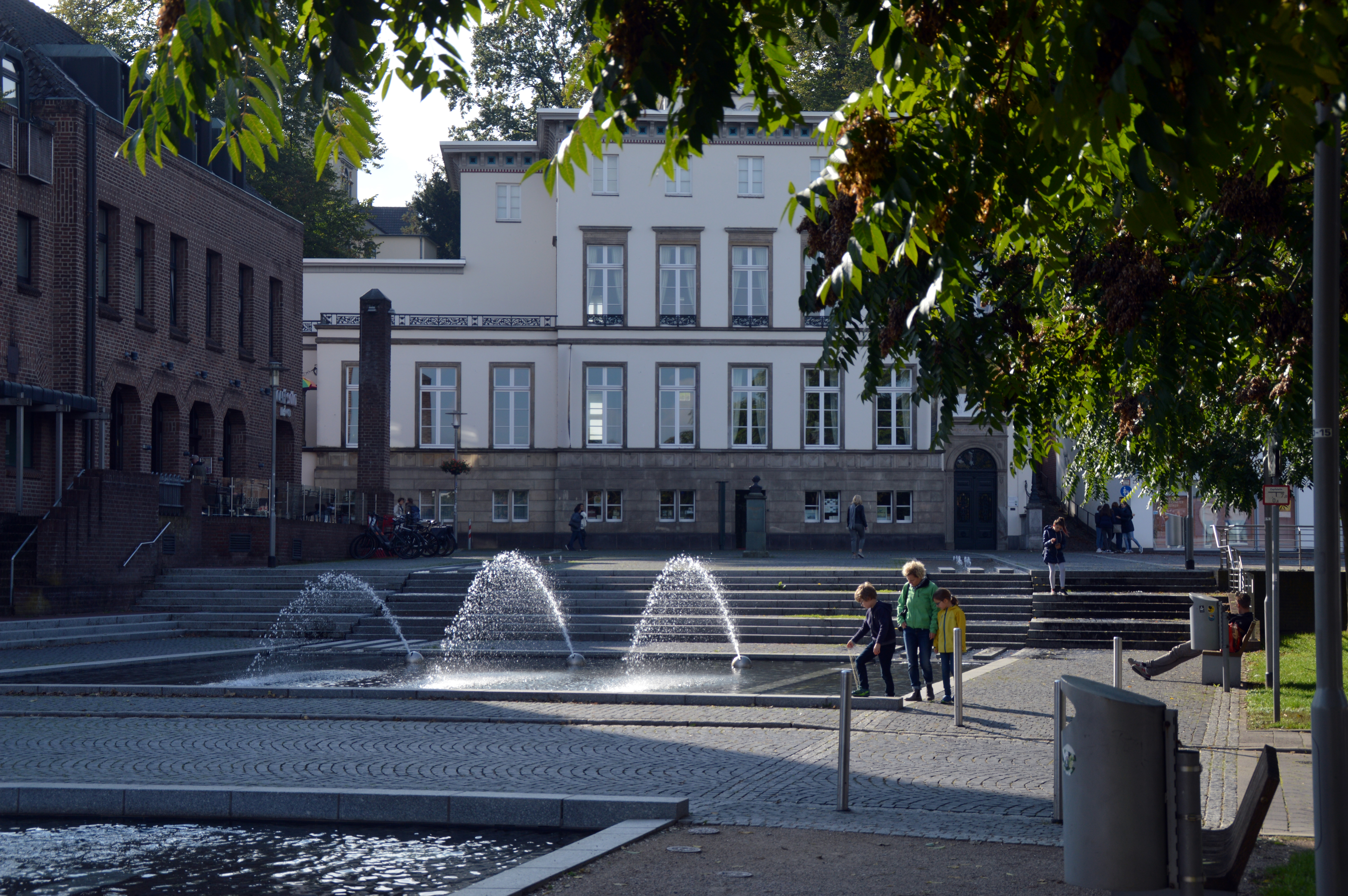
Haus Koekkoek

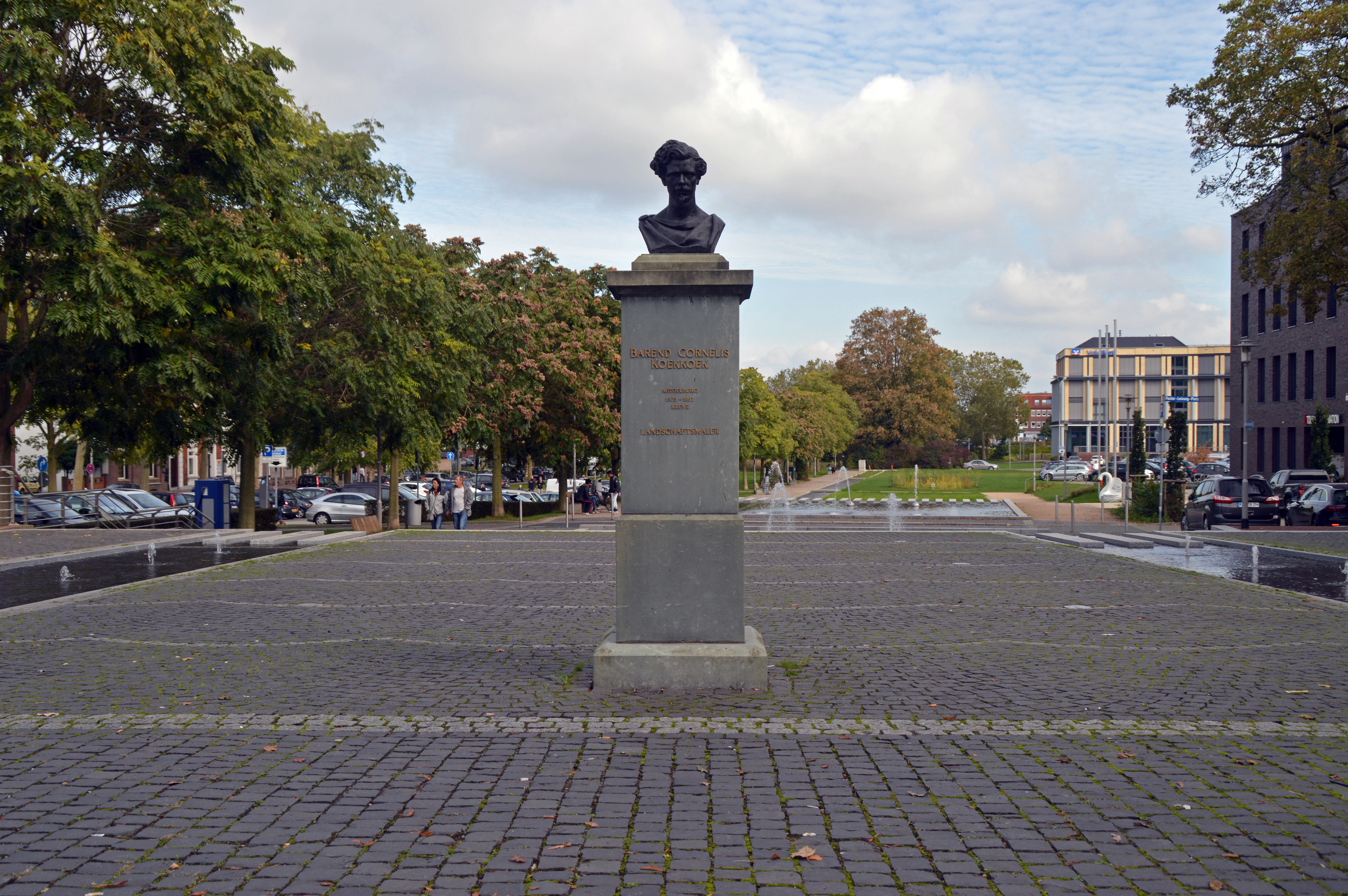
Bust Berend Cornelis Koekoek

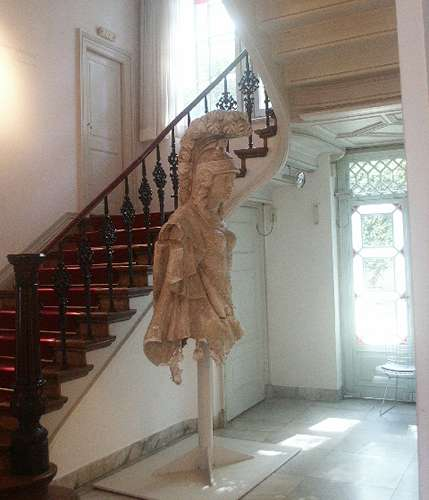
Haus Koekkoek, staircase

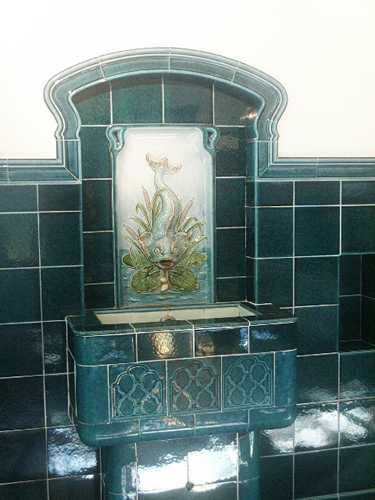
Haus Koekkoek, detail

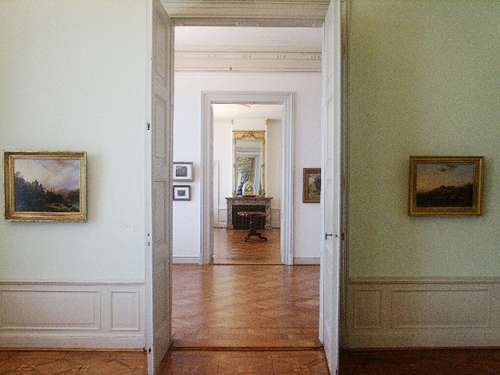
Haus Koekkoek, belle chambre

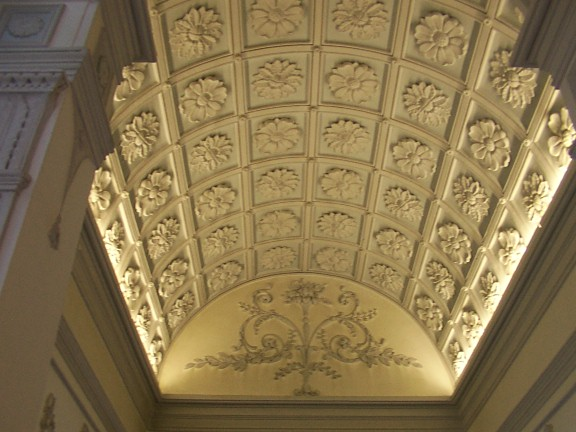
Haus Koekkoek, ceiling

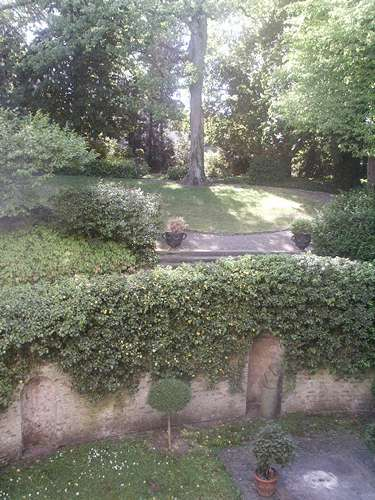
Haus Koekkoek, garden

== Works ==
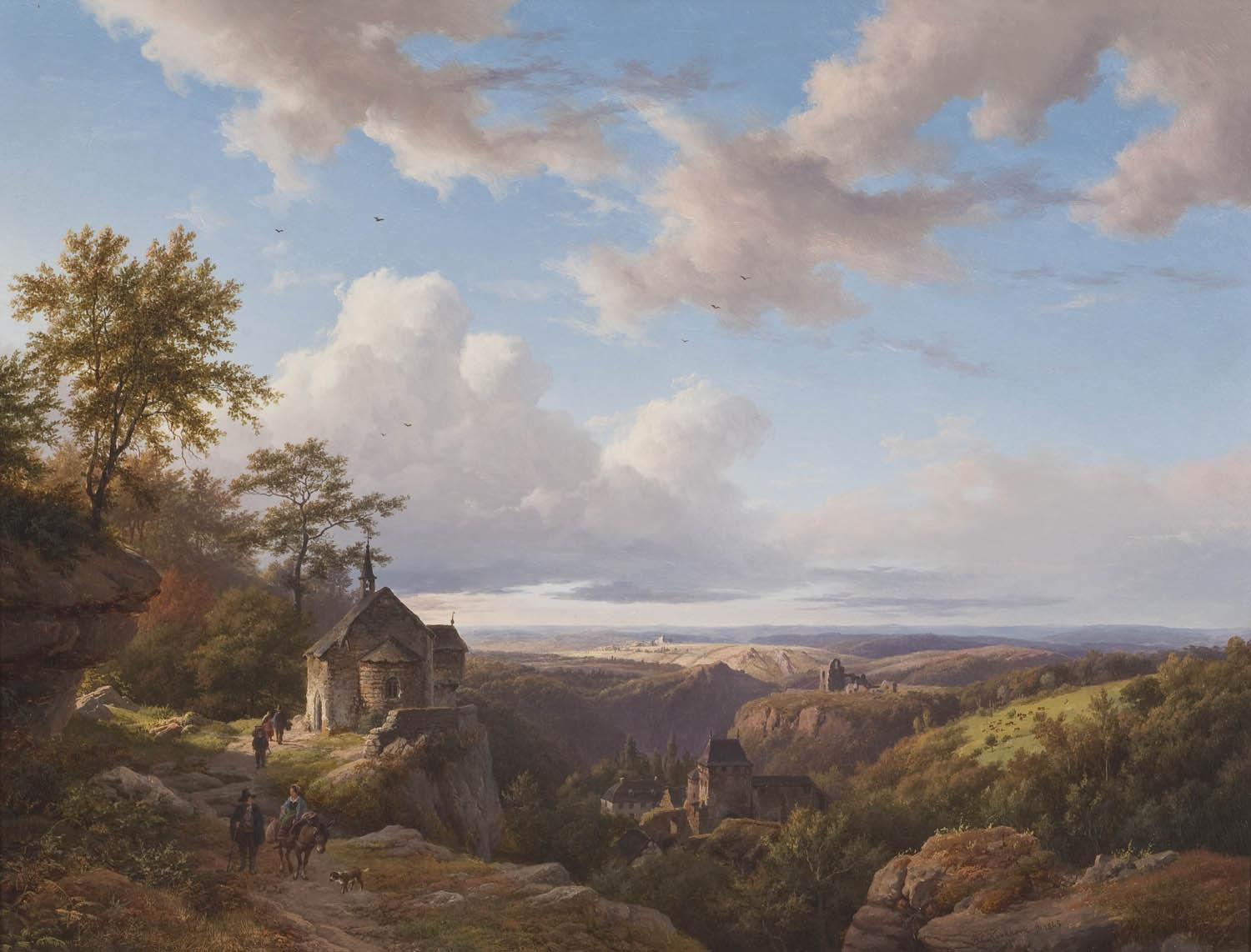
Eifel Landscape with Little Church

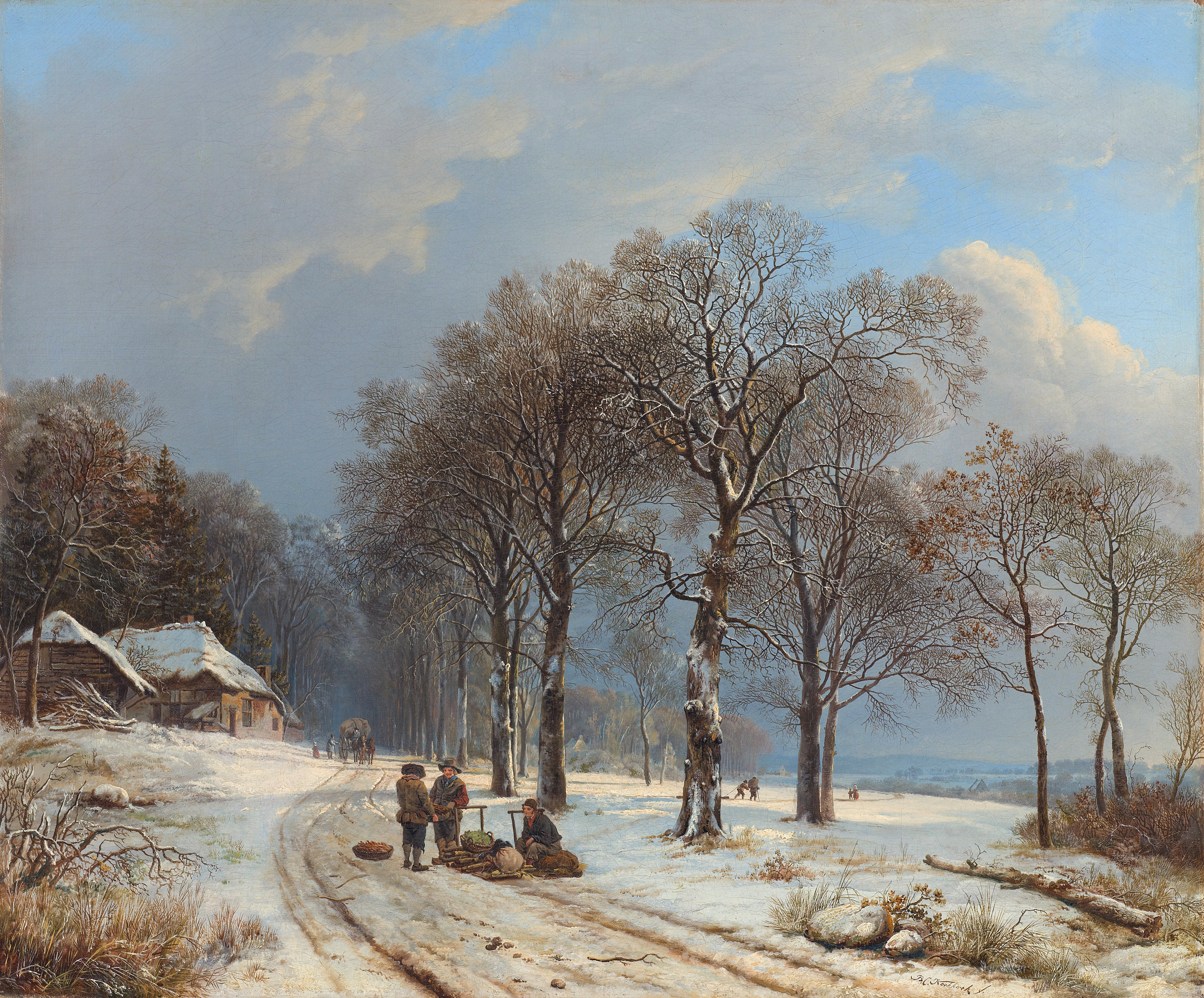
Winter Landscape

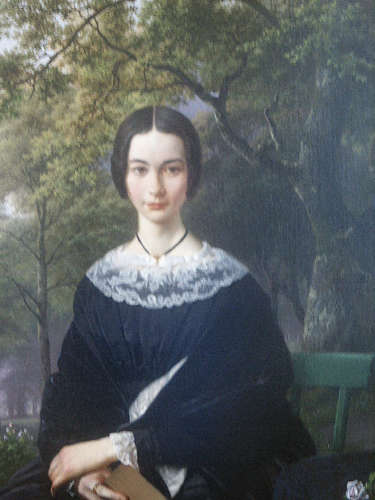
B.C. Koekkoek, portrait

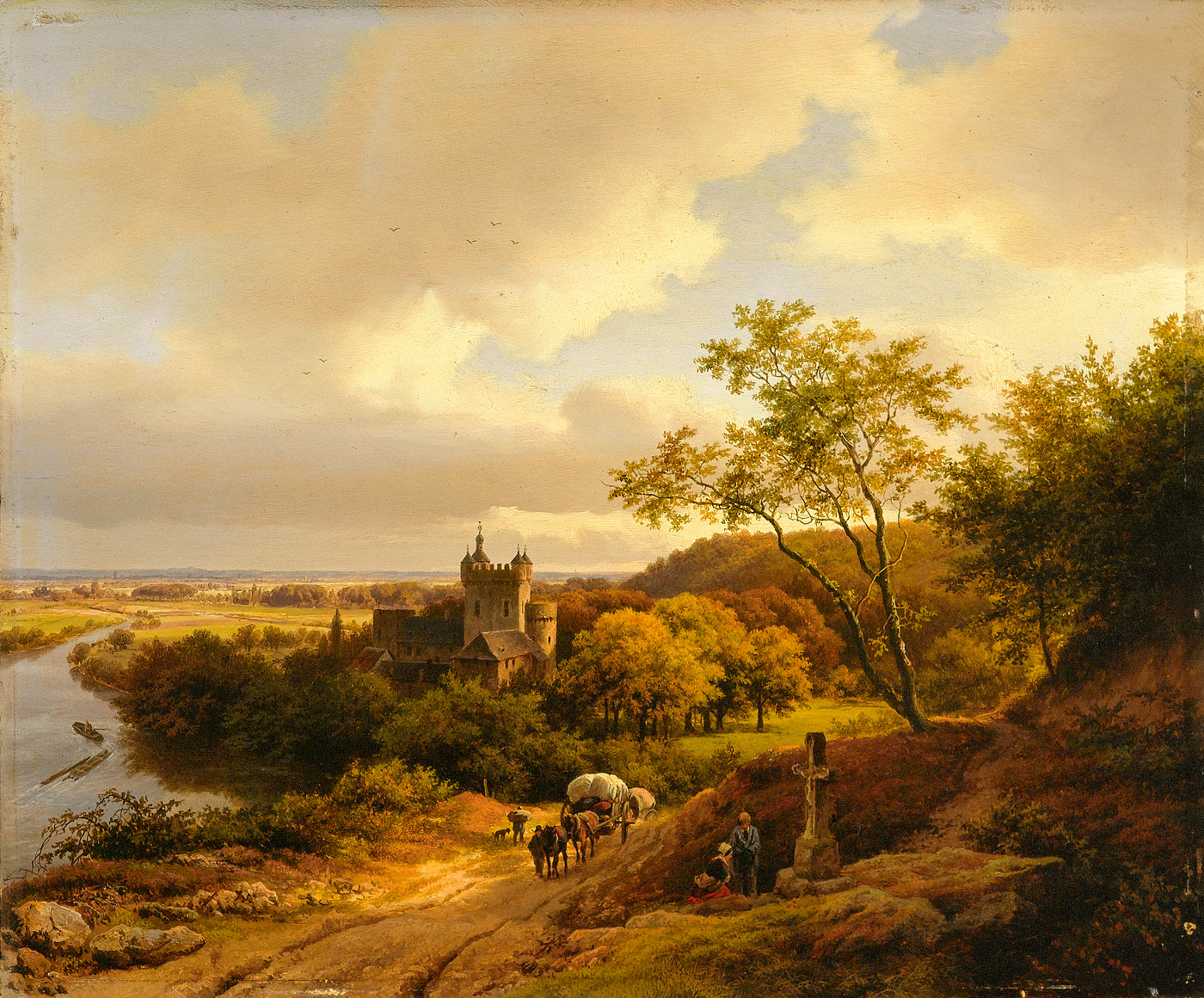
A castle on a river, between trees
