= Royal Flemish Academy of Belgium for Science and the Arts =

Royal Flemish Academy of Belgium for Science and the Arts Dutch: Koninklijke Vlaamse Academie van België voor Wetenschappen en Kunsten (KVAB)
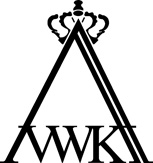
- KVAB
- Formation: 1772 (as the Theresean Academy); 1938 (as an independent institution)
- Headquarters: Brussels, Belgium
- Chairman: Ludo F. Gelders (2013/2014)
- Website: http://www.kvab.be

The Royal Flemish Academy of Belgium for Science and the Arts (Dutch: Koninklijke Vlaamse Academie van België voor Wetenschappen en Kunsten, pronounced [ˈkoːnɪŋkləkə ˈvlaːmsə ˌaːkaːˈdeːmi vɑm ˈbɛlɣijə voːr ˈʋeːtənˌsxɑpə(n) ɛn ˈkʏnstə(n)], abbr. KVAB) is an independent learned society of science and arts of the Flemish Community in Belgium. It is one of Belgium's numerous academies and traces its origin to 1772 when the Imperial and Royal Academy of Brussels was founded by empress Maria Theresia.

The academy is headquartered in the Academy Palace (Paleis der Academiën), Hertogsstraat 1, 1000 Brussels.

== Mission and goals ==
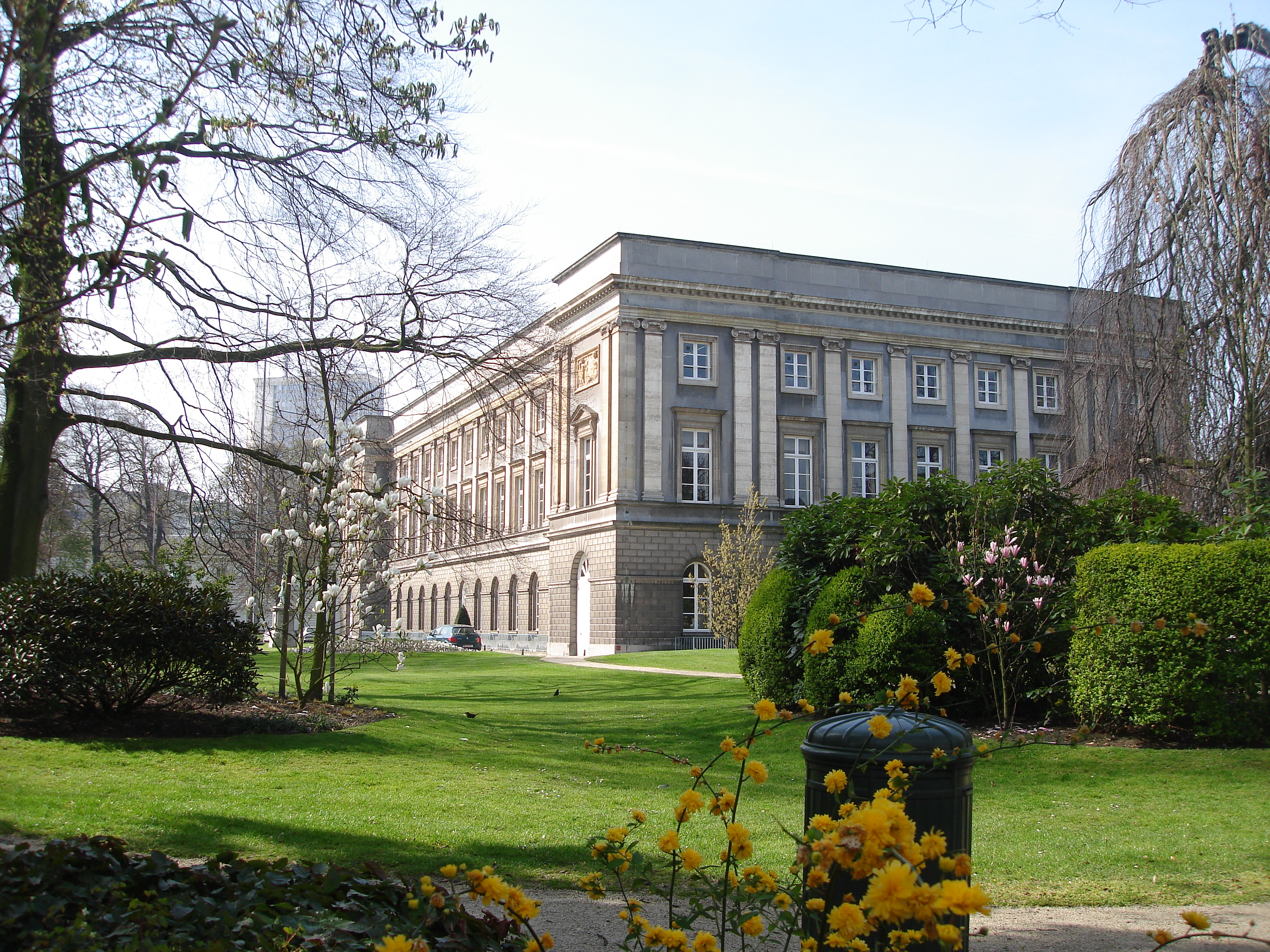
Academy Palace in Brussels

The mission and goals of the society is the practice and promotion of science and arts in Flanders. To achieve that goal a number of scientific and cultural activities is organized. Also the academy enhances and encourages the collaboration between the Flemish universities, it attracts and encourages foreign scholars to develop research activities and delegates representatives to international organisations and meetings. In addition, it advises on matters of social importance on behalf of the government, industry, educational establishments and research centres and finally the academy awards prizes to talented and promising researchers and artists.

== Administration ==
The academy is governed by a Management Committee consisting of 14 members. Every second year a new chairman (voorzitter) is elected. Since 1997 the following people have been chairman: Marcel Storme, Yvan Bruynseraede, Carl Van de Velde, Mark Eyskens, Jef Van Landuyt, Frans Boenders, Dominique Willems, Pierre Jacobs and Ludo Gelders (current chairman). On 14 December 2013 Willem Elias, a professor and dean at Vrije Universiteit Brussel, was elected as chairman for the 2015–2016 term and is expected to succeed Ludo Gelders in his office on 1 January 2015.

To perform its numerous tasks the academy can rely on an administrative office staffed by ten collaborators and managed by a permanent secretary (vast secretaris). Between 1997 and 2010 this task was fulfilled by Niceas Schamp while since 2010 the task of permanent secretary has been given to Géry van Outryve d'Ydewalle.

== Organization and members ==
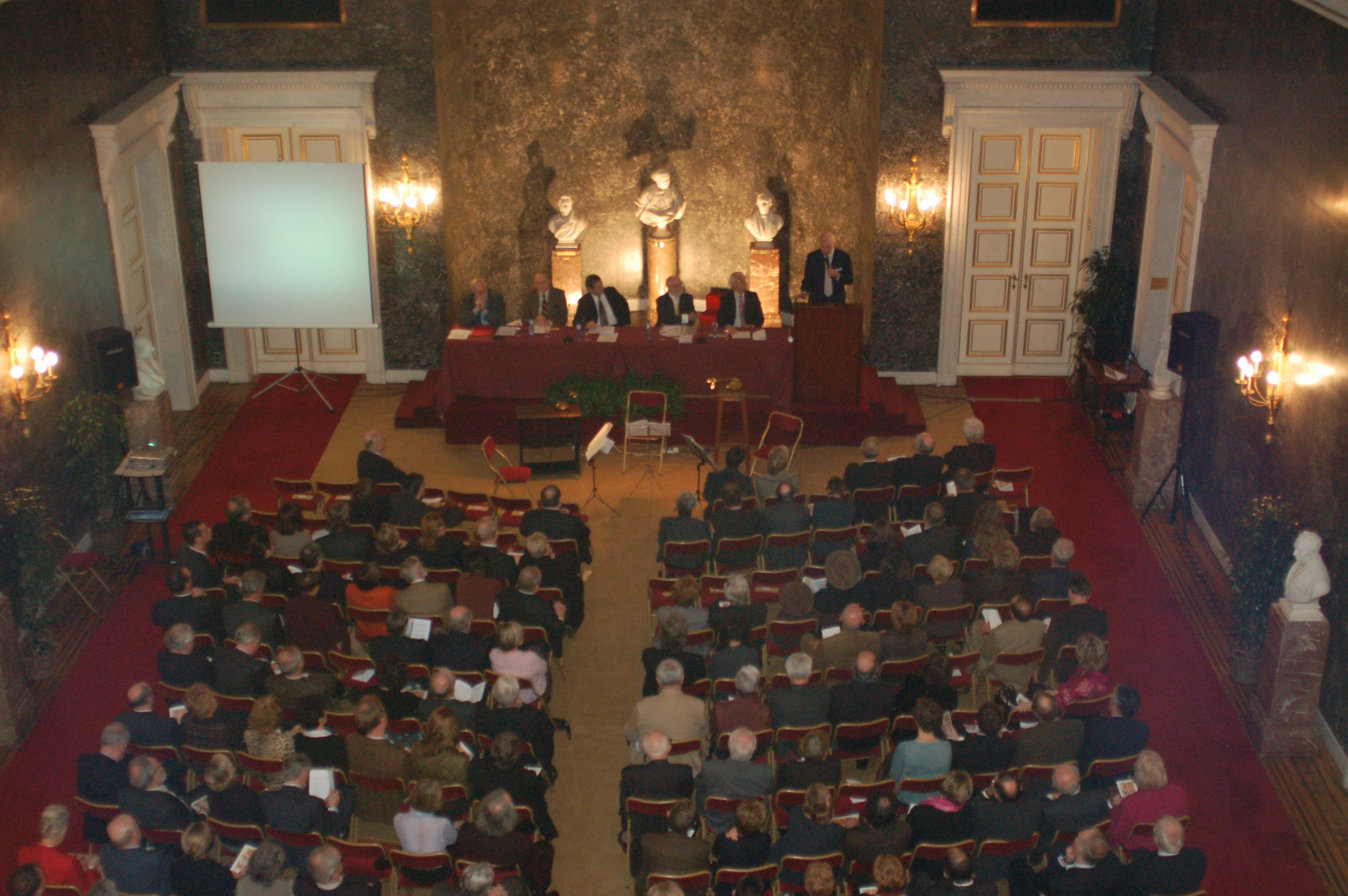
Assembly in the 'troonzaal'

The academy is divided into four major divisions (called Classes). These four classes or divisions represent the core activity of the academy and assemblies are held monthly:

- Klasse Natuurwetenschappen (Class of Natural Sciences )
- Klasse Menswetenschappen (Class of Humanities)
- Klasse Kunsten (Class of Arts)
- Klasse Technische Wetenschappen (Class of Technical Sciences)

Each class is composed of Ordinary Members (Gewone leden), Honorary Members (Ereleden) and Foreign Members (Buitenlandse leden). The maximum number of members in each class is limited to 40 persons under the age of 65. To keep in contact meetings are organized on a regular basis and in 2011 the total number of ordinary and honorary members of all classes amounted to 240.

=== Members of the class of Natural Sciences ===
- Ingrid Daubechies
- Irina Veretennicoff

=== Members of the class of Humanities ===
- Marcel Storme
- Hendrik Vervliet

=== Members of the class of Arts ===
- Anne Teresa De Keersmaeker
- Lucien Posman
- Rudi Tas
- Peter Verhoyen

=== Members of the class of Technical Sciences ===
- Dirk Fransaer

== VLAC ==
The Flemish Academic Centre for Science and the Arts VLAC (Vlaams Academisch Centrum voor Wetenschappen en Kunsten) is an IAS (Institute for Advanced Study) organized and hosted by the KVAB. VLAC was founded in 1999 to stimulate and promote scientific research in Flanders and to create unique research conditions similar to those at the Institute for Advanced Study in Princeton, the Wissenschaftskolleg in Berlin, the Swedish Collegium for Advanced Study in Uppsala or at the Netherlands Institute for Advanced Study in Wassenaar. Each year between 10 and 20 Academy Award Fellowships are awarded to mostly young foreign scientists for a certain period of time in order to get as a fellow in residence access to excellent working conditions and to do research in an outstanding environment. VLAC is a member of NetIAS, the European network of IAS centres. In addition, since 2012 VLAC has been taking part with its Brussels centre in EURIAS, the newly developed EU-supported fellowship programme.

== Academic publications ==
The KVAB has been publishing twenty monographs annually since 1939. Further publications are long term series on historical documents, Academiae Analecta and volumes of contributions based on papers read at scientific meetings (Contactfora) in Flanders.

The edition of the letters of Justus Lipsius and the Nationaal Biografisch Woordenboek (Dictionary of National Biography) in collaboration with the Koninklijke Academie voor Nederlandse Taal- en Letterkunde (KANTL) are among the most important activities with regard to Flemish cultural history.

== RASAB membership ==
Since its foundation in 2001 the KVAB has been a member of RASAB (The Royal Academies for Science and the Arts of Belgium) along with its French-speaking sister-academy ARB in order to coordinate and promote the 25 National Scientific Committees and the international activities in Belgium.

== Further activities ==
- ACF Since its foundation in 1993 the Centre for European Culture (CEC) has been organising symposia and lectures about the cultural evolution in Europe and the World. Earlier in 2013, a reorganisation of these activities took place including a name change and thus producing the Academical Cultural Forum (ACF). The name change reflects the effort to reach a more global view.
- Spring cycle (Lentecyclus). Each year the academy organises a spring cycle of three to five meetings, where the best specialists of a particular field lecture and discuss a specific topic.

== Prizes and awards ==
A broad range of scientific and art prizes is awarded each year in different kinds of subjects particularly to promising younger research workers in recognition of their achievements.

== 75 years of independence ==
On 22 October 2013 the KVAB celebrated its 75th anniversary as independent Flemish academy. From 1772 til 1938 an independent Flemish academy didn't exist and Flemish scientists and scholars of that period used to be members of the officially bilingual Royal Academy of Belgium. In 1938, however, the independent Dutch-language Koninklijke Vlaamse Academie voor Wetenschappen, Letteren en Schone Kunsten van België was created and from then on until 1971 Flemish scientists were either member of the Dutch-language Flemish academy or member of the officially bilingual ARB. This situation created confusion sometimes. As a consequence of the first state reform in Belgium in 1970, the officially bilingual Royal Academy was dissolved in 1971 and replaced by a solely French-speaking academy, ARB, for the French speaking community and a solely Dutch-speaking academy, KAWLSK, for the Flemish community. Almost 30 years later on, KAWLSK was renamed KVAB (Koninklijke Vlaamse Academie van België voor Wetenschappen en Kunsten) in 1999.

== See also ==
- Royal Academies for Science and the Arts of Belgium
- Royal Academy of Science, Letters and Fine Arts of Belgium
- Royal Academy of Dutch language and literature
- Science and technology in Flanders
- Science and technology in Belgium
