= Marcel Storme =

Belgian lawyer and politician

Marcel Storme (3 August 1930, Ghent – 30 March 2018) was a Belgian lawyer, member of the Ghent Bar, and Christian Democratic Party politician. He was the son of Professor Jules Storme and Maria Bosteels.

He went to school in the Sint-Barbaracollege in Ghent (Rhetorica 1947). He studied law at the University of Ghent and further in Paris and London, and wrote his habilitating thesis on the burden of proof (De bewijslast in het Belgisch privaatrecht, 1961).

He became Emeritus Professor of Law at the University of Antwerp and the University of Ghent, where he held the Chair in Civil Procedure.

He was a member of the Belgian Senate for the CVP (co-opted) from 1977 to 1981. He is a former president and member of the Royal Flemish Academy of Belgium for Science and the Arts, former president of the Vlaamse Juristenvereniging (Flemish Association of Lawyers) (1983–1996), president of the International Association of Procedural Law and of the Interuniversity Centre for procedural law, Chairman of the Commission for the Approximation of Procedural Law in Europe, dr. jur. h. c. Lublin University and honorary professor Beijing University.

He became a foreign member of the Royal Netherlands Academy of Arts and Sciences in 1991.

He was married on 11 July 1956 to Godelieve de Schryver, daughter of Minister of State August de Schryver and had two sons (Matthias Storme and Pieter Storme, who died young).
