= Irina Veretennicoff =

Physicist

- Born: Antwerp
- Scientific career
- Fields: Physics
- Workplaces: Vrije Universiteit Brussel
- Doctoral advisor: Radu Balescu

Irina Veretennicoff is a physicist, and professor emeritus of the Vrije Universiteit Brussel. Her major contributions to theoretical physics concern the interaction of light and matter, and photonics.

== Career ==
Veretennicoff graduated in Physics from the Vrije Universiteit Brussel (VUB) in 1973 with a doctorate under the guidance of Radu Balescu of Université libre de Bruxelles (ULB).

Irina Veretennicoff has authored over 400 papers in theoretical physics and since 1988 has been an honorary member of the Class of Natural Sciences Royal Flemish Academy of Belgium for Science and the Arts.

== Publications ==
- Vincent Ginis; Jan Danckaert; Irina Veretennicoff; Philippe Tassin (16 October 2014). "Controlling Cherenkov radiation with transformation-optical metamaterials". Physical Review Letters. 113 (16) 167402. doi:10.1103/physrevlett.113.167402. ISSN 0031-9007. PMID 25361279. Wikidata Q85894937.
- V Ginis; P Tassin; J Danckaert; CM Soukoulis; I. Veretennicoff (March 2012). "Creating electromagnetic cavities using transformation optics". New Journal of Physics. 14 (3) 033007. arXiv:1108.0598. doi:10.1088/1367-2630/14/3/033007. ISSN 1367-2630. Zbl 1448.78009. Wikidata Q122222171.
- Nancy Nieuborg; A. Kirk; A. Jourdain; Hugo Thienpont; Irina Veretennicoff (1995), Polarization-Selective Gratings for use in Optical Interconnection Systems: Technology and Perspectives, vol. 6, p. 11.5, Wikidata Q127421257

== Awards ==
- Russian State Prize for Physics and Mathematics (1990)
