= Sport Vlaanderen =

Sport Vlaanderen is the Flemish sports agency. Within Belgium, it is the Flemish counterpart of French-speaking ADEPS. Both agencies were founded in 1969 to succeed the state-founded national INEPS/NILOS.

Until 2016 Sport Vlaanderen was called Bloso, short for Bestuur voor Lichamelijke Opvoeding, Sport en Openluchtleven. The new name was assumed after a merger with the smaller departement Sport, another sports administration of the Flemish government. The new agency thereby acquired more responsibilities and greater authority over sport in Flanders.

Sport Vlaanderen has several responsibilities:

- support topsport in Flanders,
- divide government support funds over the organized sports actors in Flanders,
- operate the 13 sports centres of Sport Vlaanderen,
- organize training and courses for sports trainers,
- organize sports camps and
- making sport promotion.
