= ADEPS =

ADEPS is an administrative service of the Ministry of the French Community of Belgium charged with the promotion of sport and physical education amongst the population of the French-speaking community.

Its name is an acronym for "Administration de l'Éducation physique, du Sport et de la Vie en Plein Air". Its equivalent in the Flemish Community is Bloso (Bestuur voor de Lichamelijke Opvoeding, de Sport en het Openluchtleven). Created in 1969, these two entities were formerly a single service, INEPS, created in 1956 from the Ministry of National Education and Culture.

ADEPS and BLOSO are charged with all aspects of sport development in their own community, from the training of coaches, growth of sporting clubs, events, and communal sporting functions.

== The activities and services of Adeps ==
- Adeps has an infrastructure of 20 sport centres in the French community with a well organised structure.
