= Nadine Ivanitzky =

Ukrainian sociologist and cultural anthropologist

- Ivanitzky in 1915
- Born: 1874. Kharkiv, Kharkov Governorate, Russian Empire
- Died: March 28, 1919 (aged 44–45); London, United Kingdom
- Other names: Nadine Ivanitsky
- Occupation(s): Sociologist, cultural anthropologist
- Years active: 1908–1919

Nadine Ivanitzky (1874, Kharkiv – 28 March 1919, London) was a Ukrainian sociologist who specialized in research on primitive people. After earning a degree from the University of Geneva, she attended courses at the Sorbonne and earned a doctorate from the Free University of Brussels. Her doctoral advisor was Emile Waxweiler, who hired her as one of the ten permanent researchers at the Solvay Institute of Sociology. She was in charge of cultural anthropological research at the institute and became a specialist in studying pre-industrial cultures.

== Early life and education ==
Nadine Ivanitzky was born in 1874 in Kharkiv, in the Kharkov Governorate, of the Russian Empire. She was the next to last child in a family of eleven, who lived on an ancestral estate in Kharkiv. Ivanitzky earned a teaching diploma from the normal school in Kharkiv and at the age of eighteen moved to Geneva, Switzerland to continue her education. She studied at the University of Geneva from 1896 to 1899, earning a degree in social sciences. Leaving Switzerland, Ivanitzky took courses at the Sorbonne with Alphonse Aulard, Henri Bergson, Émile Durkheim, and Ernest Lavisse for several years. She also studied with Marcel Hébert and earned a doctorate in political science and administration from the Free University of Brussels in 1908. Her doctoral supervisor was Emile Waxweiler and her thesis was entitled "Les élites sociales" ("The Social Elites").

== Career ==
After completing her doctorate, Ivanitzky was hired as one of the ten researchers at the Solvay Institute of Sociology. The Institute of Social Sciences had been founded by chemist and industrialist Ernest Solvay in 1894 to study the socio-political development of human productivity. In 1902, it became the Institute of Sociology under the direction of Waxweiler. Waxweiler's focus was on providing researchers with access to materials and facilities where they could study and share information, which analyzed structural functionalism to determine how social relationships were created or dissolved. Ivanitzky was placed in charge of the cultural anthropological research at the institute. She became a specialist in evaluating the evolution of primitive societies, publishing numerous papers in the Bulletin de l'Institut de Sociologie Solvay. She studied Native American, Asian, African, and Pacific societies attempting to learn how over time habits and customs became codified into rules and organizational structures. At the time, indigenous societies were assumed to be "dying races" and artists, photographers, scientists, and writers were anxious to document them before they vanished. These works created wide public interest in the native inhabitants of other continents and concern that contact with Europeans would lead to their demise. From government perspectives, these types of studies justified racial policies that supported segregation, cultural assimilation, and restriction of the rights of native peoples.

In 1914, Ivanitzky was visiting in Ghent when German troops invaded. Unable to obtain travel documents as a foreigner, she posed as a Belgian friend and managed to escape to England. Making her way to London, she continued with her work at the British Museum and the Royal Anthropological Institute of Great Britain and Ireland. She also volunteered with the Red Cross. Because her trip to Britain was unplanned, Ivanitzky had left most of her work behind in Belgium. She was in the midst of evaluating racial issues in society. In 1917, along with Fernand Van Langenhove, she paid homage to Waxweiler's contributions to sociology in "La doctrine sociologique d'Émile Waxweiler", after his sudden death in 1916.

Ivanitzky's papers were collected by friends in London, who after some delay returned them to the Solvay Institute. S.-A. Deschamps and Georges Smets combined her Belgian and British notes and posthumously published her article "Les institutions des primitifs Australiens" ("The Institutions of Primitive Australians") in 1922. The work was covered in both scientific journals and popular newspapers, like Le Figaro in Paris and La Presse in Montreal. Ethnologist Guillaume Grandidier summarized her paper noting that although different from western societies, Aboriginal Australian societies respected specific territories of other aboriginal groups which were exploited for subsistence hunting and gathering. In areas in which they had not encountered Europeans, Aboriginal cultures were able to thrive, but in areas dominated by Europeans, disease and destruction of their traditional way of life was a threat. Rather than organized governance, Aboriginal societies relied on the guidance of elders and their traditions of distribution to care for the community. Sociologist Achille Ouy noted that she delineated marriage customs and methods of population control, including infanticide, used to regulate community size so that resources could sustain the population. He stated that her work was meticulously documented and was described in exacting detail, and was an "excellente monograph" (excellent monograph).

== Death and legacy ==
Ivanitzky died on 28 March 1919 in London from the influenza pandemic which followed the end of World War I. Her work continued to be cited by researchers throughout the 20th century, although later scholars recognized that the early ideas that pre-industrial societies were inferior have been discarded. She was included in 21st-century scholarship on the composition of the student body of the University of Brussels, undertaken to study the foreign students who attended the university.

== Selected works ==
- Ivanitzky, Nadine (October 1910). "La mentalité des primitifs dans ses rapports avec leur vie sociale" [The Mentality of Primitives in Relation to Their Social Life]. Bulletin mensuel (in French) (8). Brussels: Solvay Institute of Sociology. ISSN 1783-5747. article #124.
- Ivanitzky, Nadine (May 1911). "Comment la vie en groupes restreints conditionne le prolongement des rapports sociaux après la mort" [How Life in Small Groups Conditions the Continuation of Social Relations after Death]. Bulletin mensuel (in French) (15). Brussels: Solvay Institute of Sociology. ISSN 1783-5747. article #240.
- Ivanitzky, Nadine (May 1911). "Sur l'attestation des droits individuels chez certains primitifs" [On the Attestation of Individual Rights among Certain Primitives]. Bulletin mensuel (in French) (15). Brussels: Solvay Institute of Sociology. ISSN 1783-5747. article #241.
- Ivanitzky, Nadine (November–December 1911). "Sur le rôle de l'administration dans les sociétés primitives" [On the Role of Administration in Primitive Societies]. Bulletin mensuel (in French) (17). Brussels: Solvay Institute of Sociology. ISSN 1783-5747. article #276.
- Ivanitzky, Nadine (November–December 1911). "Influences de deux formes diverses de la croyance aux morts sur l'organisation sociale primitive" [Influences of Two Diverse Forms of Belief of the Dead on Primitive Social Organization]. Bulletin mensuel (in French) (17). Brussels: Solvay Institute of Sociology. ISSN 1783-5747. article #277.
- Ivanitzky, Nadine (1912). "Sur la stabilité d'une organisation politique primitive fondée sur une adaptation traditionnelle" [On the Stability of Primitive Political Organization Based on Traditional Adaptation]. Bulletin mensuel (in French) (20). Brussels: Solvay Institute of Sociology. ISSN 1783-5747. article #320.
- Ivanitzky, Nadine (1913). "Sur des formes systématisées d'instruction de la jeunesse chez les primitifs" [On Systematized Forms of Instruction of Youth among Primitive Peoples]. Bulletin mensuel (in French) (25). Brussels: Solvay Institute of Sociology: 300–305. ISSN 1783-5747.
- Ivanitzky, Nadine (1913). "Comment les attitudes des primitifs à l'égard des choses inconnues sont conditionnées par les adaptations au milieu" [How the Attitudes of Primitives to Unknown Things Are Conditioned by Adaptations to the Environment]. Bulletin mensuel (in French) (26). Brussels: Solvay Institute of Sociology: 663–672. ISSN 1783-5747.
- Ivanitzky, Nadine (November 1915). "The System of Kinship Amongst the Primitive Peoples as Determined by Their Mode of Grouping". Man. 15. London: Royal Anthropological Institute of Great Britain and Ireland: 163–165. doi:10.2307/2788800. ISSN 0025-1496. OCLC 5545574142.
- Ivanitzky, Nadine; Van Langenhove, Fernand (January 1917). "La doctrine sociologique d'Émile Waxweiler" [The Sociological Doctrine Of Emile Waxweiler]. Science Progress (in French). 11 (43). London: John Murray: 423–430. ISSN 2059-495X. OCLC 5919330957.
- Ivanitzky, Nadine (1922). Deschamps, S.-A.; Smets, Georges (eds.). Les institutions des primitifs Australiens [The Institutions of Primitive Australians] (in French). Brussels, Belgium: Maurice Lamertin. OCLC 251150677.
