= Georgii Zeliony =

Georgii Pavlovich Zeliony (Russian: Гео́ргий Па́влович Зелёный; 1878 in Odessa – 1951) was a Russian physiologist who contributed to the understanding of conditional and unconditional reflexes. He was one of I. P. Pavlov's first students. His studies of decorticated dogs led to knowledge of brain function in man and other animals. In addition, he was the first to articulate the theoretical underpinnings of sociophysiology.

== In Pavlov's lab ==
Beginning around 1905, Zeliony, along with colleagues in Pavlov’s laboratory, performed experiments on dogs (Zeliony 1906b: 80; Delabarre 1910: 85-86; Warden 1928: 507):

Experiments conducted by M. Pawlow and his pupils add confirmation to the view that “all physiological phenomena may be completely studied as if psychical phenomena had no existence.” Direct excitation of the mouth cavity of a dog produces an “unconditional” reflex secretion of the saliva. In case the exciting substance is something the dog eats, the secretion is thick; if it be one that the dog refuses, the secretion is more liquid. Any other excitant, acting on any sense whatever (or any combination of excitants), may provoke a “conditional” reflex secretion of either kind, provided it has previously acted on the animal conjointly with another excitant which has produced an unconditional reflex. The conditional reflexes are very instable and variable. But the exact conditions of their origin, their force and their disappearance can be stated in physiological terms. The so-called psychical excitants are identical with these conditional reflexes (Delabarre 1910: 85–86).

Pavlov, in his eighth lecture on conditioned reflexes, describes one of Zeliony's experiments:

A conditioned alimentary reflex was established to the simultaneous application of the tone of a pneumatic tuning-fork, which was considerably damped by being placed within a wooden box coated with wool, and of a visual stimulus of three electric lamps placed in front of the dog in the slightly shaded room (Pavlov 1927: 142–143 [Lecture VIII]).

Another of Zeliony's experiments was described by Pavlov as follows:

An alimentary reflex was established in a dog to a compound stimulus made up of the sound of a whistle and the sound of the tone d sharp of a pneumatic tuning-fork. Both these sounds appeared to the human ear to be of equal intensity, and both when tested separately elicited a secretion of 19 drops of saliva during one minute. In addition to this, another compound stimulus was established, made up of the same sound of the whistle plus the tone a of a tuning-fork of weaker intensity. When tested separately the whistle in this case elicited a secretion of seven drops of saliva during thirty seconds, and the tone only one drop (Pavlov 1927: 143 [Lecture VIII]).

Zeliony completed his doctorate in 1907, the same year in which Pavlov, his supervisor, was elected to the Academy of Russian Sciences.

== The future sociophysiology ==
On March 19, 1909, Zeliony presented a paper before the Saint Petersburg Philosophical Society in which he called for a special natural science to study the physical side of human interrelations. He called this potential new science, "physiological sociology," or, using a term he attributed to A. I. Wedensky, "sociophysiology" (Zeliony 1912b: 405–406).

Zeliony's paper, later published in the July–August 1912 issue of the Archiv für Rassen- und Gesellschafts-Biologie [Archive for racial and social biology], was reviewed by Piéron (1913) and Ellwood (1916). Piéron (1913: 366) noted that Zeliony positively compared his approach to that of Emile Waxweiler and Ernest Solvay’s Institute of Sociology in Brussels, and also that Zeliony argued that

Sociology, in order to enter the ranks of the natural sciences, must be physiological. As it is with animals (bees, ants, etc.), there will likewise be a human socio-physiology studying the reciprocal interrelations among humans. (Piéron 1913: 365).

However, owing perhaps to the fact that the French review mistakenly titled Zeliony's paper, "Über die zukünftige Soziopsychologie" [On the future sociopsychology], rather than the correct "Über die zukünftige Soziophysiologie" [On the future sociophysiology], and also to the fact that the journal in which it was published later became a mouthpiece for eugenicist, anti-semitic, Nazi propaganda, Zeliony's future field floundered.

Half a century or more later, and often without remarking on Zeliony's preliminary sketch, scattered workers in diverse fields began to rediscover sociophysiology: clinical psychiatrists (e. g., Kaiser 1952; Boyd and Di Mascio 1954; Di Mascio et al. 1955; Lacroix 1955); sociologists and ethologists (e. g., Wickler 1976; Quddus 1980; Barchas 1984, 1986; Barchas and Mendoza 1984; Waid 1984); evolutionary psychiatrists (e. g., Gardner 1996, 1997, 2001; Gardner and Price 1999; Gardner and Wilson 2004); and medical doctors (e. g., Adler 2002; Mandel and Mandel 2003).

== Revolution and disappearance ==
It appears that Zeliony continued to work and publish during the first two decades of Russia's Bolshevik and early Soviet regimes. In 1919, for instance, he became chair of the Department of Normal Physiology at the newly created Veterinarian Bacteriological Institute in Petrograd. Though Zeliony was still officially an employee of the state-run laboratory under Pavlov's leadership, in 1921, he attempted to found his own institute for the study of animal behaviour. Zeliony's proposal to secure funding for his project from the government was criticized by Pavlov and rejected (Todes 1998: 38–39).

Around the same time, Zeliony worked with P. A. Sorokin and other sociologists in both the Russian Sociological Society and the Circle for the Objective Study of Human Social and Individual Behaviour.

Later, under Stalin, it seems that Zeliony faded from view:

In 1932, before our Laboratory started on decorticate conditioning, Mettler had come across studies more recent than Zeliony’s 1911 report [i. e., Zeliony 1912a]. Using Bechterev’s shock-reinforcement technique with three dogs operated on in 1928, the objective was to determine the minimal essential functional cortex to establish conditioning (Poltyreff & Zeliony, 1929, 1930). The reports were imprecise and the animals were then still alive. At any rate, Mettler made serious attempts to communicate with Zeliony, but to no avail. According to him, “these two workers disappeared from the scene, and it was very difficult to communicate with specific people in Russia if they did not hold key positions” (Mettler, Note 1). Knowledgeable Soviet scholars have demonstrated that the period of the 1930s in the Stalin era was difficult and that many disappearances were not accidental. There is little question that the behavioral sciences had been politicized over the years since the 1917 Revolution (Girden 1983: 246).

However, in 1951, an article, by a certain G. P. Zelenyi, on methods of researching conditioned reflexes in animals, was published in a Soviet journal (Zelenyi 1951). Given the various other ways of transliterating his name, it could be the case that G. P. Zelenyi was indeed G. P. Zeliony.

== Notes and references ==
=== Works by Zeliony ===
- Zeleny, G. P. (1906a). L’orientation du chien dans le domaine des sens. Trudy obchestva russkikh vratchei [Proceedings of the Russian medical society], tome 73. (Cited in Heissler 1958: 407, 426.)
- Zeliony, G. (1906b). De la sécrétion de salive dite psychique. D’après les travaux de Pawlow et de ses élèves. L’Année Psychologique, tome 13, pp. 80–91.
- Zeliony, G. P. (1907a). [A conditioned reflex to an interruption of a sound.] Proc. of Russian Med. Soc. in Petrograd, vol. 74; also Karkov Med. Jour., 1908. (Cited in Pavlov 1927.)
- Zeliony, G. P. (1907b). [Contribution to the problem of the reaction of dogs to auditory stimuli.] Thesis, Petrograd, 1907; Prelim. Commun. Russian Med. Soc. in Petrograd, vol. 73, 1906. (Cited in Pavlov 1927.)
- Zeliony, G. P. (1909a). [A special type of conditioned reflexes.] Archive Biol. Sciences, vol. xiv, no. 5. (Cited in Pavlov 1927.)
- Zeliony, G. P. (1909b). Über der Reaktion der Katze auf Tonreiz. Zentralblatt für Physiologie, Bd. xxiii. (Cited in Pavlov 1927.)
- Zeliony, G. P. (1910a). Analysis of complex conditioned stimuli. Proc. Russian Med. Soc. in Petrograd, vol. 77. (Cited in Pavlov 1927.)
- Zeliony, G. P. (1910b). [Upon the ability of the dog to discriminate auditory stimuli applied in succession, according to different numbers of their repetition.] Proc. Russian Med. Soc. in Petrograd, vol. 77. (Cited in Pavlov 1927.)
- Zeliony, G. P. (1912a). [Observations upon dogs after complete removal of the cerebral cortex.] Proc. Russian Med. Soc. in Petrograd, vol. 79; also a second commun. in same volume. (Cited in Pavlov 1927.) (Cited in Heissler (1958: 426) as Zeleny (G. P.). Le chien sans hémisphères cérébraux, Trudy obchestva russkikh vratchei, 1912.
- Zeliony, G. P. (1912b). Über die zukünftige Soziophysiologie. [On the future sociophysiology.] Archiv für Rassen- und Gesellschafts-Biologie, vol. 9, no. 4, pp. 405–429, July–August 1912. [Als Bericht in der St. Petersburger Philosophischen Gesellschaft vorgetragen am 19. März 1909.]
- Prokofiev, G., et Zeliony, G. (1926). Des modes d’associations cérébrales chez l’homme et chez les animaux. Journal de Psychologie, XXIIIe Année, no. 10, Décembre 1926.
- Poltyrev, S. S., und Zeliony, G. P. (1929). Der Hund ohne Grosshirn. Abstracts of Communications to the Thirteenth International Physiological Congress, Boston. American Journal of Physiology, vol. 90, no. 2, October 1929, pp. 475–476.
- Zeliony, G. (1929). Effets de l’ablation des hémisphéres cérébraux. Revue de médecine, vol. 46, pp. 191–214.
- Poltyreff, S. S., und Zeliony, G. (1930). Grosshirnrinde und Assoziationsfunction. Zeitschrift für Biologie, vol. 90, pp. 157–160.
- Zélény, G. P., and Kadykov, B. I. (1938). [Contribution to the study of conditioned reflexes in the dog after cortical extirpation]. Méd. exp. Kharkov, no. 3, 31–43. (Psychological Abstracts, 1938, 12, No. 5829.)
- Zelenyi, G. P. (1951). О методике исследования условных рефлексов у животных. (O metodike issledovanija uslovnykh refleksov u zhivotnykh.) [On a method of investigating conditioned reflexes in animals.] Журнал Выщей Нервно Деятельности Имени И. П. Павлова [Zhurnal vysshei nervno dejatel'nosti imeni I. P. Pavlova], 1(2):147-59, 1951 Mar-Apr. (Cited in Medline.)

=== Other sources ===
- Adler, H. M. (2002). The sociophysiology of caring in the doctor–patient relationship. Journal of General Internal Medicine, vol. 17, no. 11, pp. 883–890.
- Barchas, P. R., ed. (1984). Social Hierarchies: Essays Toward a Sociophysiological Perspective. Westport, CT: Greenwood.
- Barchas, P. R. (1986). A sociophysiological orientation to small groups. In E. J. Lawler, ed., Advances in Group Processes, vol. 3, pp. 209–246. Greenwich, CT: JAI Press.
- Barchas, P. R., and Mendoza, S. P., eds. (1984). Social Cohesion: Essays Toward a Sociophysiological Perspective. Westport, CT: Greenwood.
- Boyd, R. W., and Di Mascio, A. (1954). Social behavior and autonomic physiology (a sociophysiologic study). Journal of Nervous and Mental Disease, vol. 120, nos. 3–4, pp. 207–212.
- Delabarre, E. B. (1910). [Review of L’Année Psychologique. Treizième Année, 1907; Quatorzième Année, 1908. Publiée par Alfred Binet. Paris, Masson et Cie.] Science, New Series, vol. 32, no. 811, July 15, 1910, pp. 85–86.
- Di Mascio, A., Boyd, R. W., Greenblatt, M., and Solomon, H. C. (1955). The psychiatric interview (a sociophysiologic study). Diseases of the Nervous System, vol. 16, no. 1, pp. 4–9.
- Ellwood, C. A. (1916). Objectivism in sociology. American Journal of Sociology, vol. 22, no. 3, November 1916, pp. 289–305.
- Gardner Jr., R. J. (1996). Psychiatry needs a basic science titled sociophysiology. Biological Psychiatry, vol. 39, no. 10, pp. 833–834.
- Gardner Jr., R. J. (1997). Sociophysiology as the basic science of psychiatry. Theoretical Medicine, vol. 18, no. 4, pp. 335–356.
- Gardner Jr., R. J. (2001). Affective neuroscience, psychiatry and sociophysiology. Evolution and Cognition, vol. 7, no. 1, pp. 25–30.
- Gardner Jr., R. J., and Price, J. S. (1999). Sociophysiology and depression. In T. E. Joiner and J. C. Coyne, eds., The Interactional Nature of Depression: Advances in Interpersonal Approaches. Washington, DC: American Psychological Association.
- Gardner Jr., R. J., and Wilson, D. R. (2004). Sociophysiology and evolutionary aspects of psychiatry. In J. Panksepp, ed., Textbook of Biological Psychiatry. New York: Wiley.
- Girden, E. (1983). Conditioning decorticate canines in Culler’s laboratory: Some reflexions and second thoughts. American Journal of Psychology, vol. 96, no. 2, Summer 1983, pp. 243–252.
- Heissler, N. (1958). Quelques travaux des psychologues soviétiques sur la réaction d’orientation. L’Année Psychologique, tome 58, no. 2, pp. 407–426.
- Kaiser, L. (1952). Naar een stichting voor Sociophysiologie. Medisch Contact, vol. 12, no. 9, pp. 143–145.
- Lacroix, A. C. (1955). Le myo-œdème sociophysiologique; son intérêt dans la connaissance des états collectifs de malnutrition. Bulletin de la Société de Pathologie Exotique et de ses Filiales, vol. 48, no. 2, pp. 185–191.
- Mandel, S. and Mandel, H. (2003). Comment on "The sociophysiology of caring in the doctor–patient relationship," by Adler, H. M. Journal of General Internal Medicine, vol. 18, no. 4, p. 317.
- Pavlov, I. P. (1927). Conditioned reflexes: An investigation of the physiological activity of the cerebral cortex. G. V. Anrep, trans. London: Oxford University Press.
- Piéron, H. (1913). [Analyses bibliographiques. III. Psychologie comparée. 6° Psychologie ethnologique et sociale. Psychologie religieuse: G. P. Zeliony. — Ueber die zukünftige Soziopsychologie (Sur la socio-psychologie future). — Archiv für Rassen und Gesellschafts-biologie, 1912, 4.] L’Année Psychologique, Tome 20, pp. 365–366.
- Quddus, M. A. (1980). Sociophysiology of political attitudes: some preliminary observations from Bangladesh. PhD dissertation in political science, University of Idaho.
- Todes, D. (1998). Павлов и Большевики. [Pavlov and the Bolsheviks.] ВИЕТ, no. 3, pp. 26–59.
- Waid, W. M., ed. (1984). Sociophysiology. New York: Springer Verlag.
- Warden, C. J. (1928). The development of modern comparative psychology. Quarterly Review of Biology, vol. 3, no. 4, December 1928, p. 507.
- Wickler, W. (1976). The ethological analysis of attachment. Sociometric, motivational and sociophysiological aspects. Zeitschrift für Tierpsychologie, vol. 42, no. 1, pp. 12–28.

== See also ==
- Biological psychology
- Classical conditioning
- Physiological psychology
- Psychophysiology
- Reflex
- Social psychology (psychology)
- Social psychology (sociology)
- Sociophysiology
- Ivan Pavlov
- Pitirim Sorokin
