= Leopold Park =

Park in Brussels, Belgium

- Parc Léopold (French); Leopoldpark (Dutch)
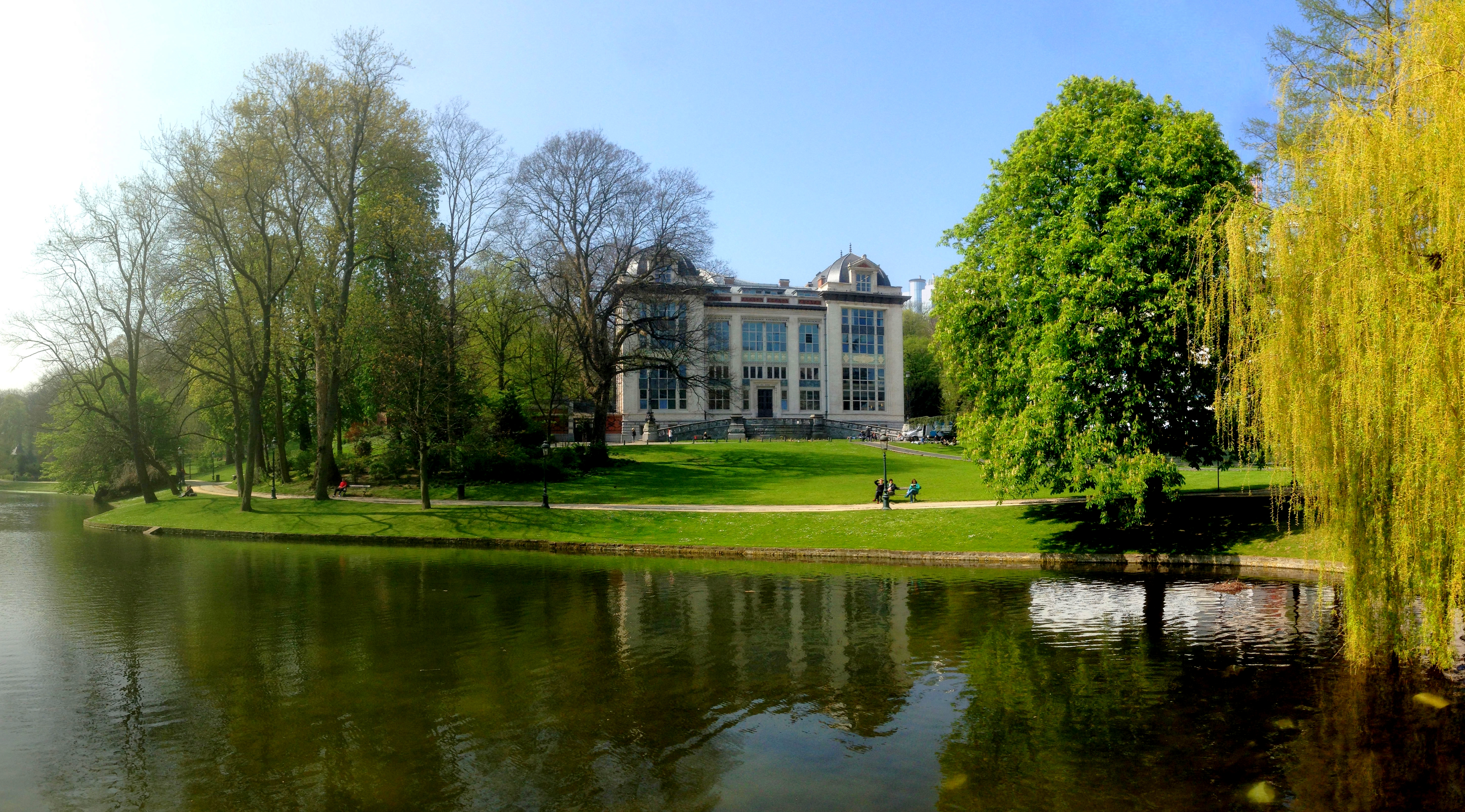
- Leopold Park's pond with the Lycée Émile Jacqmain in the background
- Interactive map of Leopold Park
- Type: Public park
- Location: City of Brussels, Brussels-Capital Region, Belgium
- Coordinates: 50°50′18″N 4°22′48″E
- Area: 6.43 ha (15.9 acres)
- Created: c. 1880
- Status: Open year-round
- Public transit: Brussels-Luxembourg; 1 5 Maelbeek/Maalbeek and Schuman

Leopold Park (French: Parc Léopold, pronounced [paʁk leɔpɔl(d)]; Dutch: Leopoldpark, pronounced [ˈleːjoːpɔltˌpɑr(ə)k]) is an urban public park of 6.43 ha (15.9 acres) located within the Leopold Quarter (European Quarter) of Brussels, Belgium. It is adjacent to the Museum of Natural Sciences and the Paul-Henri Spaak building, the seat of the European Parliament.

The park's outstanding feature is its pond, fed by the Maelbeek stream. Many rare trees (remnants of a botanical garden) and animals such as mallards, moorhens, coots, and even Egyptian geese and rose-ringed parakeets thrive in this urban environment.

== History ==
The Eggevoorde Estate had dominated the Maelbeek valley in Brussels since the Middle Ages, but portions had been sold off in the following centuries. In 1851, a portion of the estate was sold off in exchange for shares in the Zoological and Horticultural Society, and the area became what is today Leopold Park. The park was intended to be a venue for scientific and leisure activities. Horticultural gardens and a zoo were created along with a community hall, a reading room, and a café-restaurant. However, the zoo was poorly managed and the management company went bankrupt in 1876. The horticultural gardens, on the other hand, were quite successfully managed by Jean Jules Linden, and they became a commercial and scientific success story until his death in 1898. The City of Brussels bought the old zoological gardens in 1908 and converted them into a public recreational park containing a variety of attractions, including the current Museum of Natural Sciences.

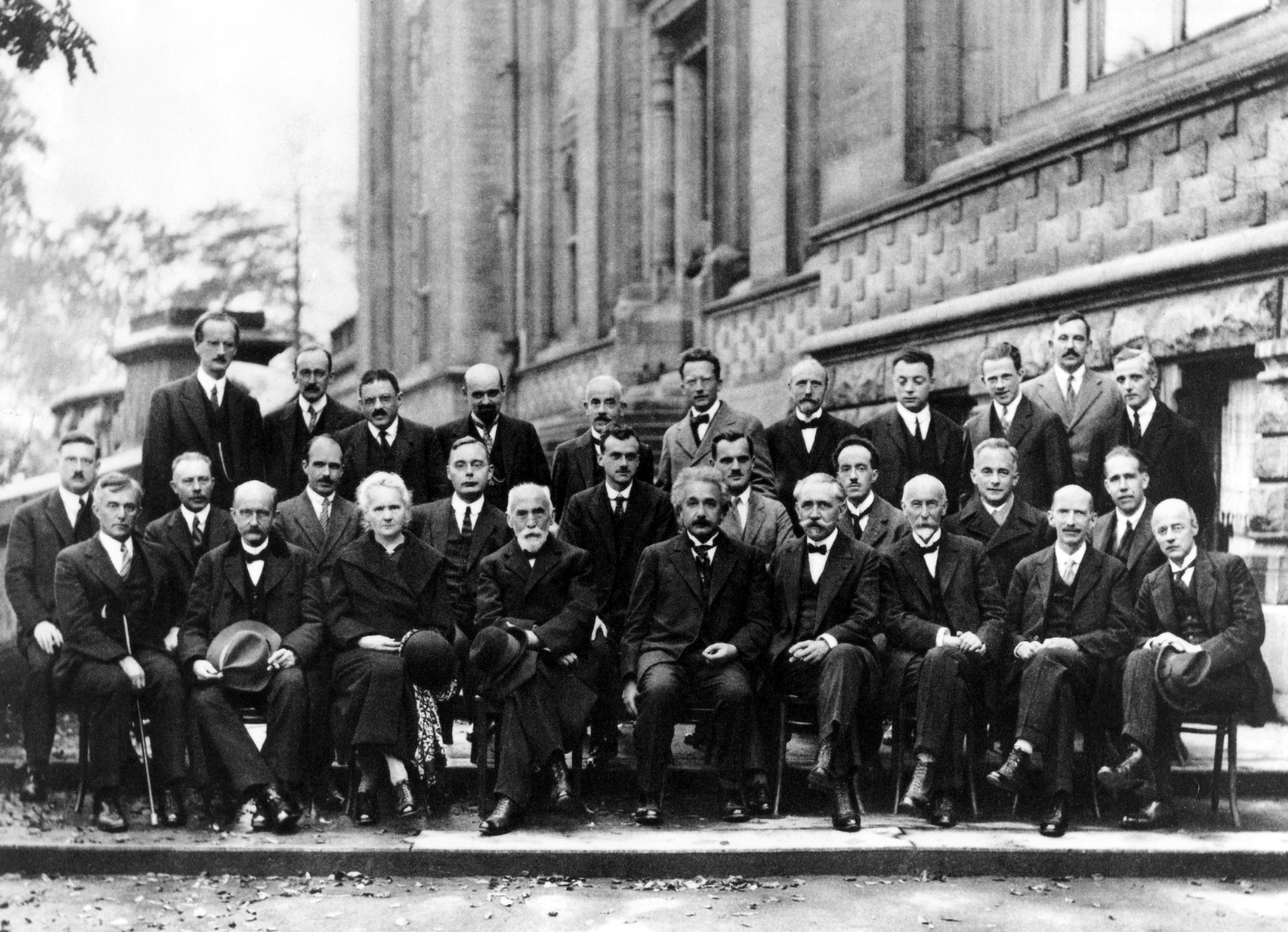
The 1927 Solvay Conference in Brussels was the fifth world physics conference.

In 1884, Ernest Solvay and Paul Heger, professors at the Université libre de Bruxelles (ULB), began a project to create an expanded university campus in the park. Several of the university's new institutes were established there, and still stand today, including the original site of the Solvay Institute of Sociology, as well as its sister institution, the Solvay Institute of Physiology, which was completed in 1894. It was in that building that the famous fifth Solvay Conference on Physics and on Chemistry took place in October 1927.

Over the following years, a campus was established for the Solvay School of Commerce, but construction of additional buildings was soon curtailed for fear of encroaching on the park and its fragile wildlife. In 1930, the Lycée Émile Jacqmain secondary school moved into the former Institute of Physiology; it later expanded to include the School of Commerce and the Institute of Anatomy. These buildings have remained to this day, but only one still belongs to Solvay (and houses the Solvay Conference). The Institute of Hygiene, Therapeutics, and Bacteriology, for its part, was demolished to make way for the Eastman Dental Hospital.

== Buildings ==
Leopold Park contains several historic buildings, such as the Pasteur Institute (in activity from 1903 to 1987, converted into the representation of Bavaria since 2004), the former Solvay School of Commerce, the Solvay Institute of Sociology, the Solvay Institute of Physiology, as well as the former Solvay Library, which houses the Security & Defence Agenda, Friends of Europe and Maisons de l'Europe think tanks.

Most of the buildings were converted into offices for the European institutions in the 1980s. The former Institute of Physiology now houses the Lycée Émile Jacqmain. In 2017, the House of European History, a history museum, opened in the refurbished Eastman Dental Hospital. The building of the Royal Belgian Institute of Natural Sciences is also located in the park.

Leopold Park buildings

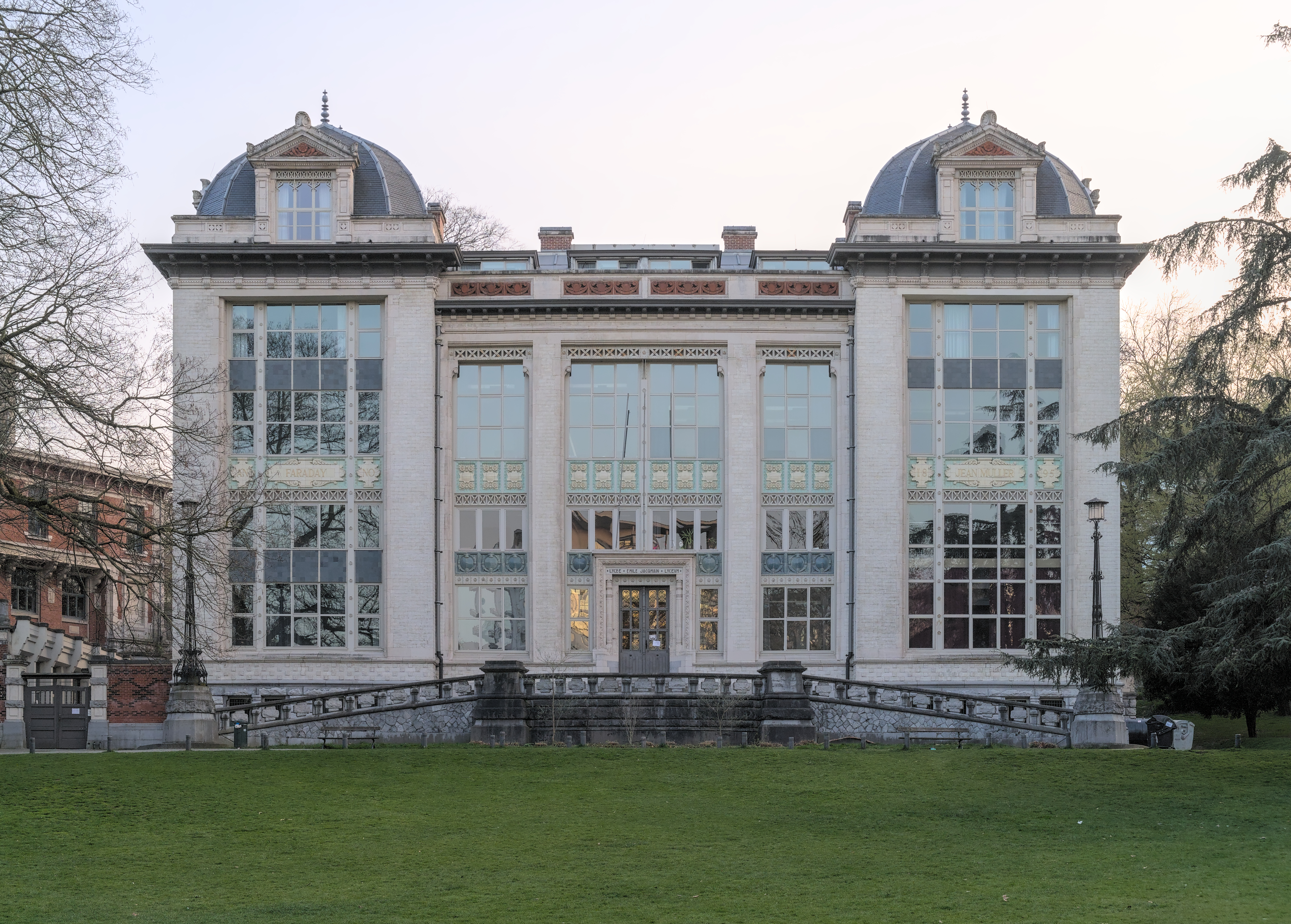
Former Institute of Physiology, venue of the fifth Solvay Conference in 1927, now the Lycée Émile Jacqmain

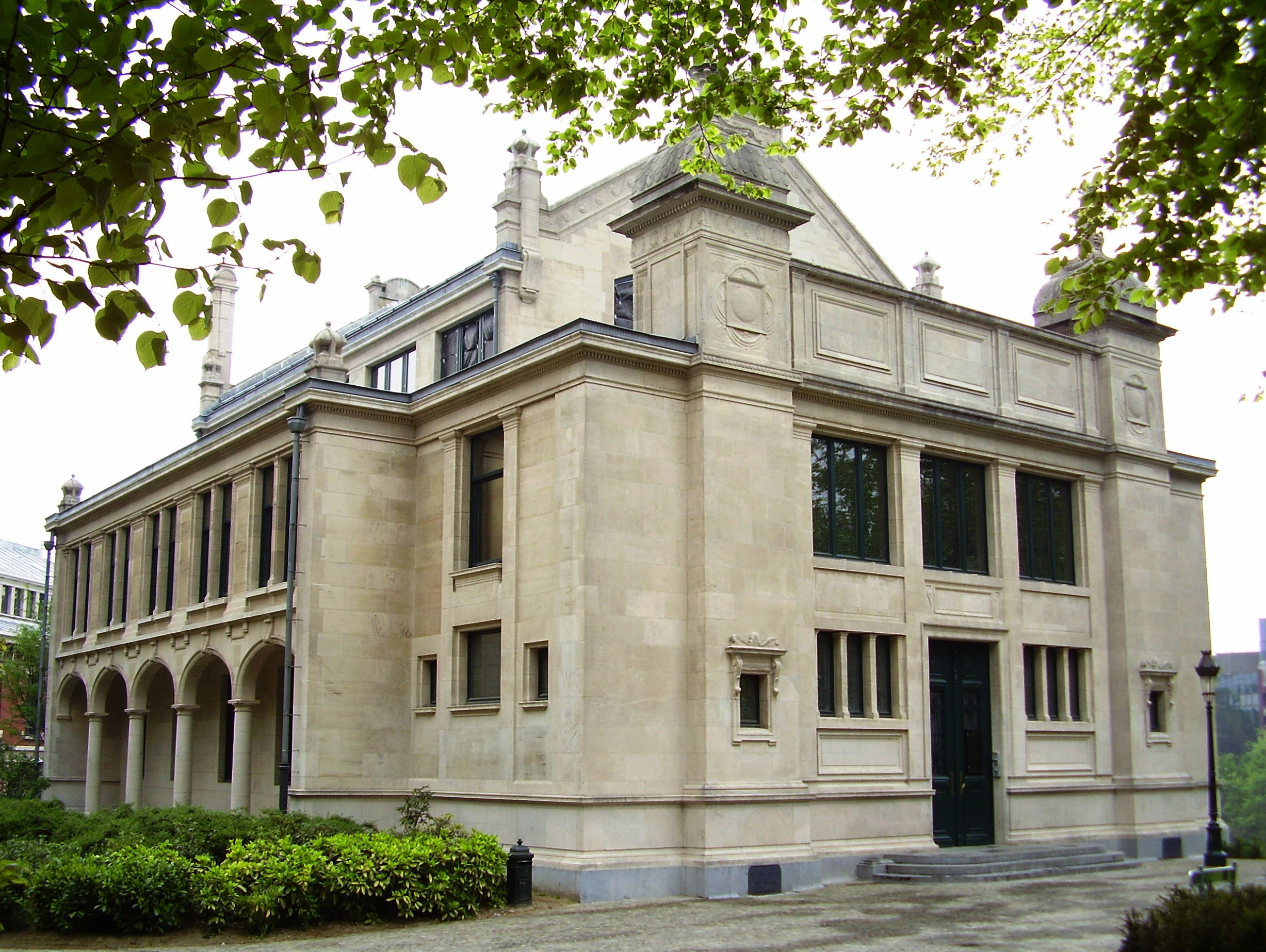
Former Institute of Sociology, now the Solvay Library

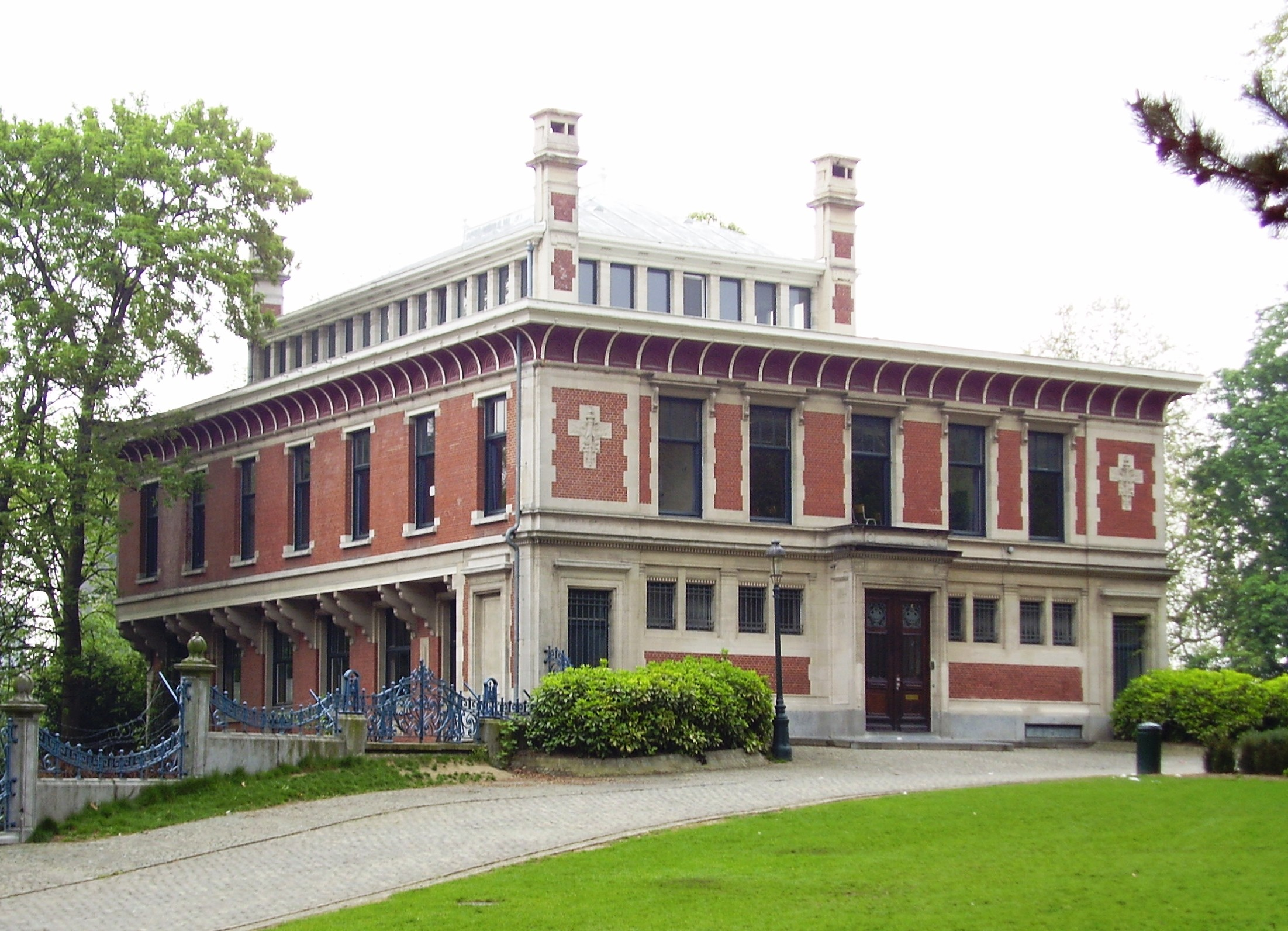
Former Solvay School of Commerce, now the Lycée Émile Jacqmain (annexe)

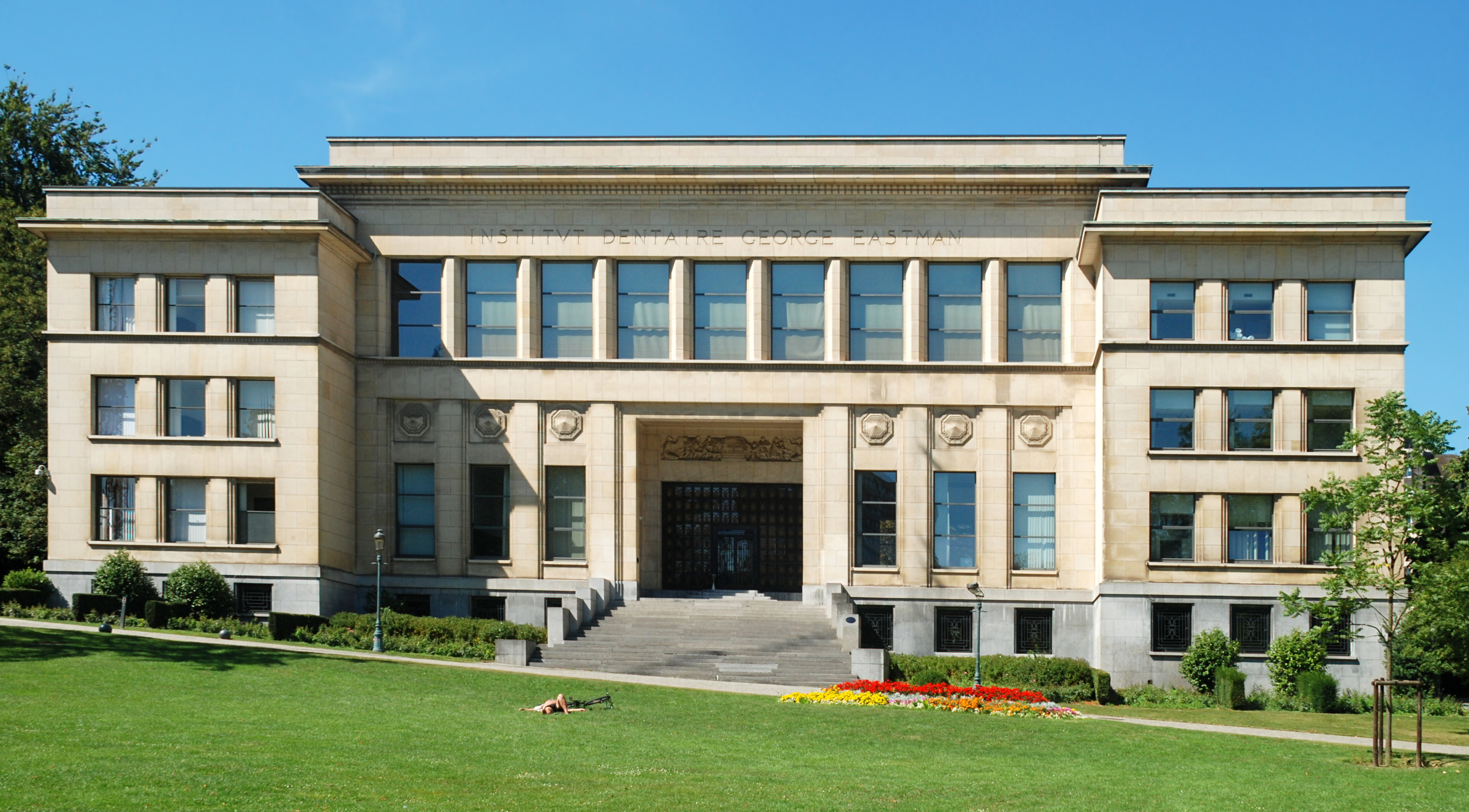
Former Eastman Dental Hospital, now the House of European History

== Remarkable trees ==
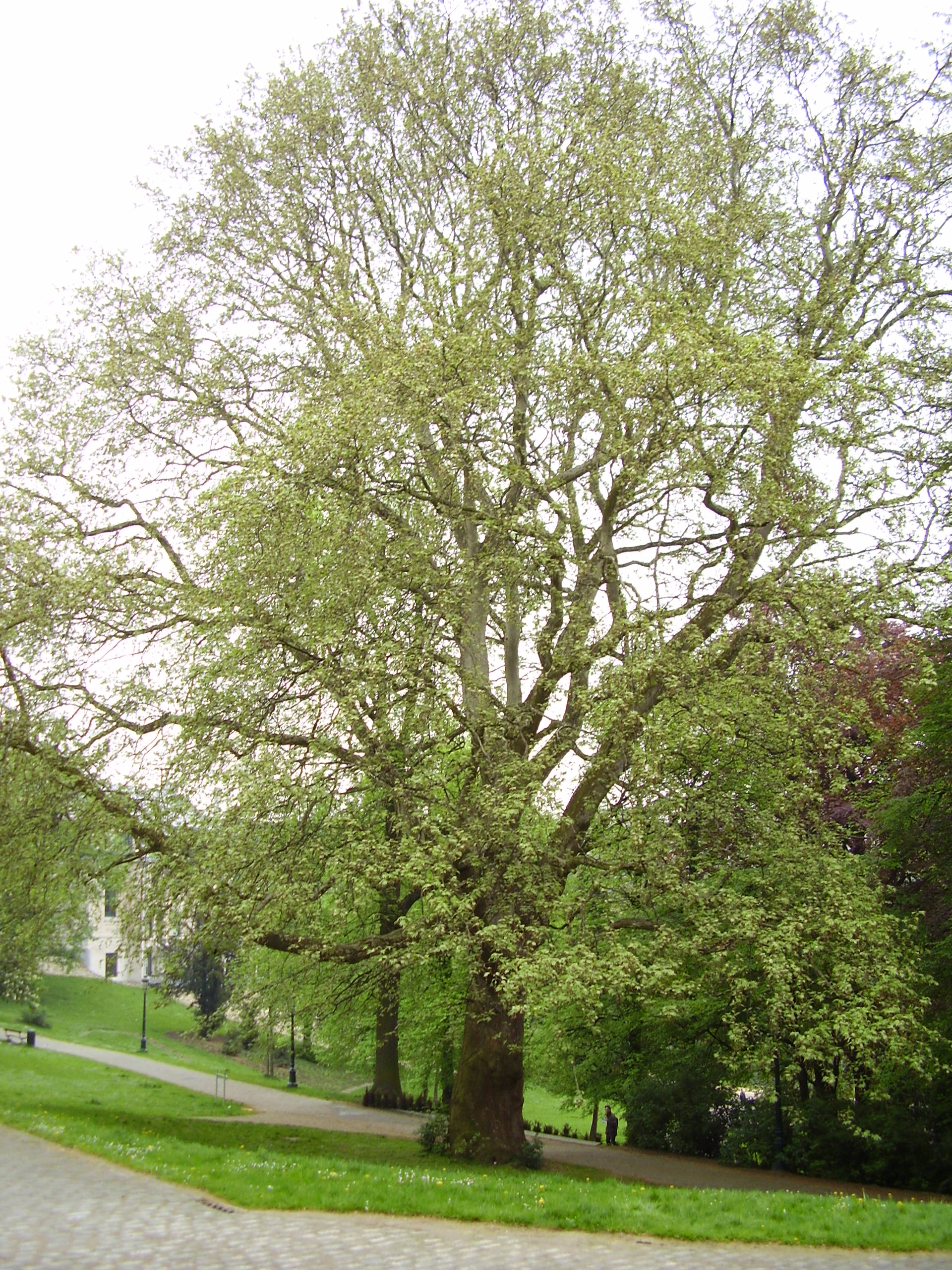
Oriental plane in Leopold Park

Below are some of the park's remarkable trees listed by the Monuments and Sites Commission:

English name	Latin name	cir. in cm
Oriental plane	Platanus orientalis	586
Horse-chestnut	Aesculus hippocastanum	444
European beech	Fagus sylvatica	391
Tulip tree	Liriodendron tulipifera	342

== See also ==
- List of parks and gardens in Brussels
- History of Brussels
- Belgium in the long nineteenth century
