= House of European History =

Museum of European history in Brussels, Belgium

House of European History (HEH)

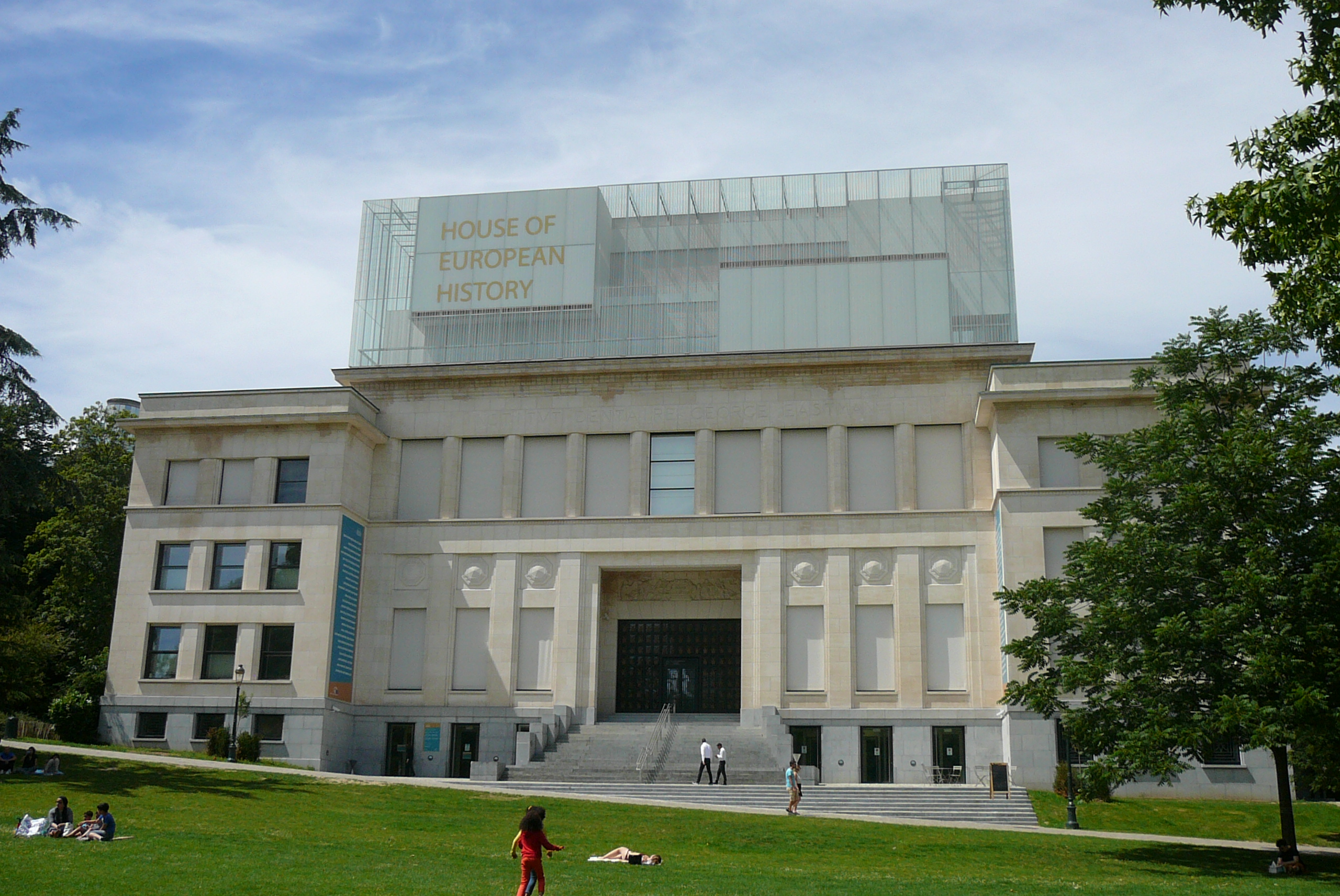
- House of European History in the former Eastman Building, Leopold Park, Brussels
- Interactive map of the House of European History (HEH) area
- Former names: Eastman Dental Hospital; Eastman Building

General information
- Type: History museum
- Location: European Quarter, Leopold Park, Rue Belliard / Belliardstraat 135, 1000 City of Brussels, Brussels-Capital Region, Belgium
- Coordinates: 50°50′24.1″N 4°22′42.6″E
- Inaugurated: 6 May 2017; 9 years ago

Technical details
- Floor area: 8,000 m^{2} (86,000 sq ft)

Design and construction
- Architects: Atelier Chaix & Morel et Associés

Other information
- Public transit: Brussels-Luxembourg; 1 5 Maelbeek/Maalbeek and Schuman

Website
- historia.europa.eu/en

The House of European History (HEH) is a history museum and cultural institution in Brussels, Belgium, focusing on the recent history of Europe. It is an initiative by the European Parliament, and was proposed in 2007 by the Parliament's then-president, Hans-Gert Pöttering; it opened on 6 May 2017.

As a cultural institution and exhibition centre, the House of European History presents a permanent exhibition on European history and European integration, as well as temporary exhibitions. Its collection includes objects and documents relating to European history, presented chronologically and thematically. It also organises educational programmes and cultural events, and produces publications and online content.

The museum is located in the former Eastman Dental Hospital, in Leopold Park, next to the Lycée Émile Jacqmain and close to the European institutions.

== History ==
The idea of creating a museum dedicated to European history was launched on 13 February 2007 by then-President of the European Parliament, Hans-Gert Pöttering, in his inaugural speech. One of the key objectives of the project was "to enable Europeans of all generations to learn more about their own history and, by so doing, to contribute to a better understanding of Europe's development, now and in the future."

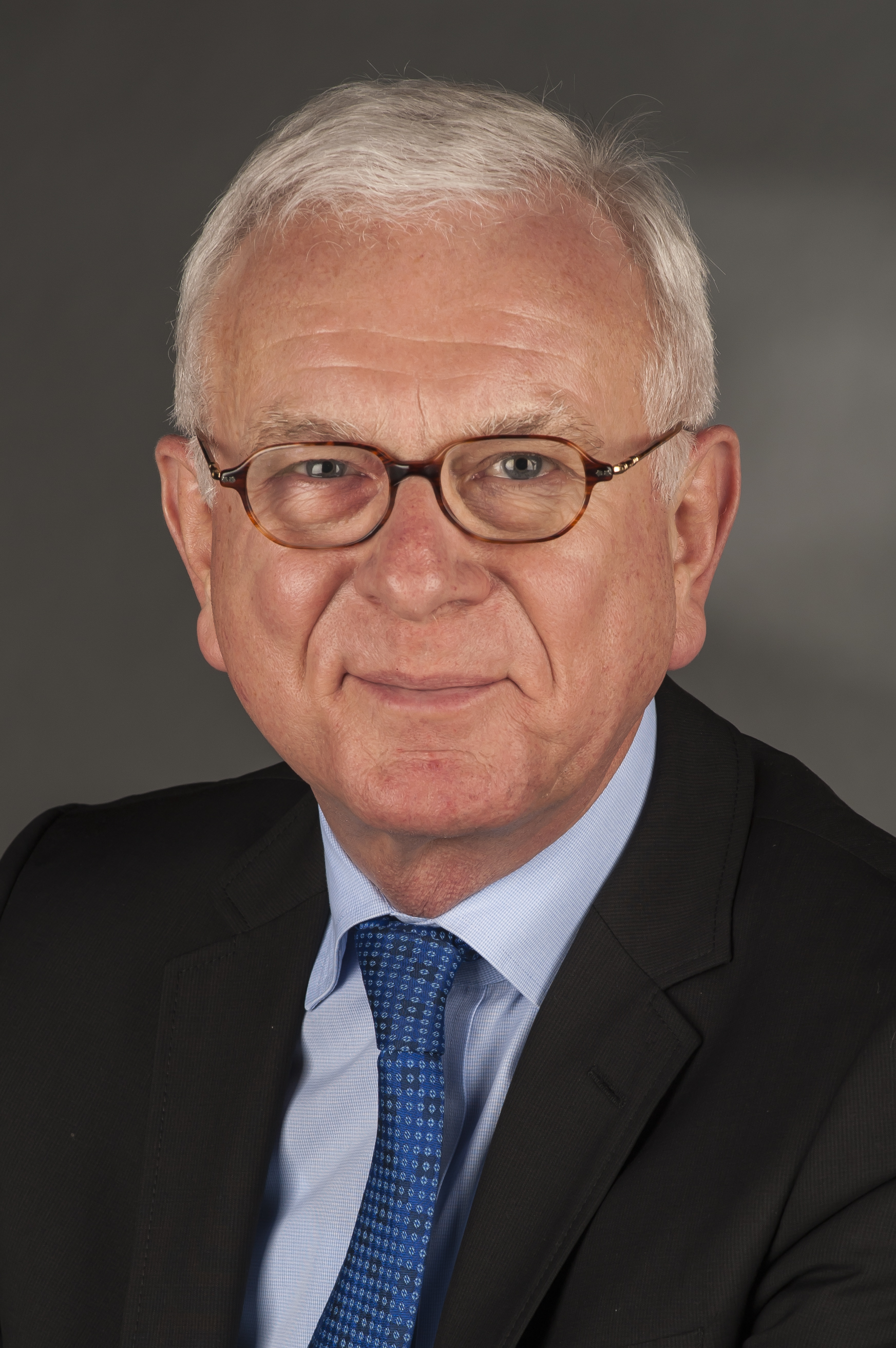
President of the European Parliament, Hans-Gert Pöttering, launched the idea of the museum in 2007.

In October 2008, a committee of experts led by Professor Hans Walter Hütter, the Head of the House of the History of the Federal Republic of Germany, submitted a report entitled "Conceptual Basis for a House of European History", which established the project's general concept and content and outlined its institutional structure.

In June 2009, the Bureau of the European Parliament decided to assign the former Eastman Dental Hospital to the future museum and, in July, launched an international architectural competition. On 31 March 2011, Atelier d'architecture Chaix & Morel et associés (France), JSWD Architects (Germany) and TPF (Belgium) were awarded the contract to carry out the building's renovation and extension. With the backing of an expert board, which brought together internationally renowned specialists chaired by Professor Włodzimierz Borodziej, a multi-disciplinary team of professionals led by historian and curator Taja Vovk van Gaal was set up within the European Parliament's Directorate-General for Communication to prepare the exhibitions and the structure of the future establishment.

The cost of the development phase in 2011–2015 equalled €31 million for the building's renovation and extension, €21.4 million for the permanent and the first temporary exhibitions (€15.4 million for fitting-out exhibition and other spaces, €6 million for multilingualism) and €3.75 million to build up the collection. The museum is funded by the European Parliament.

== Collection and scope ==
The House of European History gives visitors the opportunity to learn about European historical processes and events, and engage in critical reflection about their implications on the present day. It is a centre for exhibitions, documentation and information, which places processes and events within a wider historical and critical context, bringing together and juxtaposing the contrasting historical experiences of European people.

The museum provides a transnational overview of European history, while taking into account its diversity and its many interpretations and perceptions. It aims to enable a wide public to understand recent history in the context of previous centuries that have marked and shaped ideas and values. In this way, the museum aims to facilitate discussion and debate about Europe and the European Union (EU).

With a surface area of approximately 4,000 m^{2} (43,000 sq ft), the permanent exhibition is the museum's centrepiece. It also has 800 m^{2} (8,600 sq ft) for temporary exhibitions. Using 1,500 objects and documents from over 300 museums and collections from across Europe and beyond, and an extensive range of media, it provides a journey through European history, principally that of the 20th century, with references to notable periods and events, as well as a particular emphasis on the development of European integration.

=== Permanent exhibition ===
Spanning five floors, the permanent exhibition's galleries use objects and multimedia resources to take visitors on a narrative that focuses on European history, particularly during the 19th and 20th centuries. The permanent exhibition presents European political, economic, social and cultural history in a chronological layout, but with a thematic approach.

The exhibition begins with the myth of the goddess Europa, delving into Europe's ancient roots and the continent's heritage of shared traditions and achievements, before continuing through Europe's journey towards modernity in the 19th century and the rebuilding process following World War II. The final section challenges visitors to critically assess European history, its potential and its future.

In December 2012, in the context of the Nobel Peace Prize awarded to the EU, it was decided that the Nobel medal and diploma will form part of the museum's permanent exhibition, as the first objects in its collection.

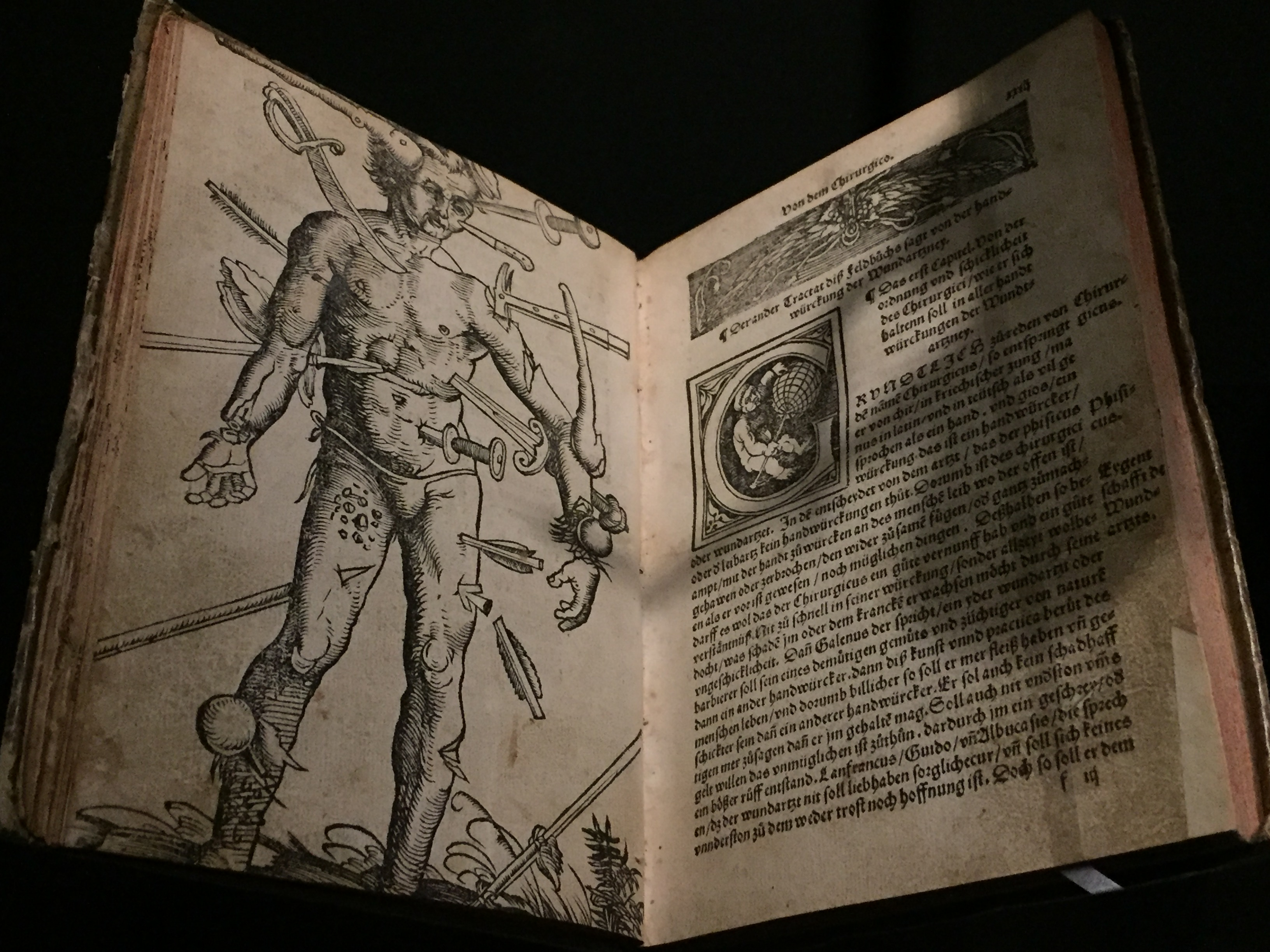
Field surgery book by Hans von Gersdorff and Hans Wechtlin (1526)

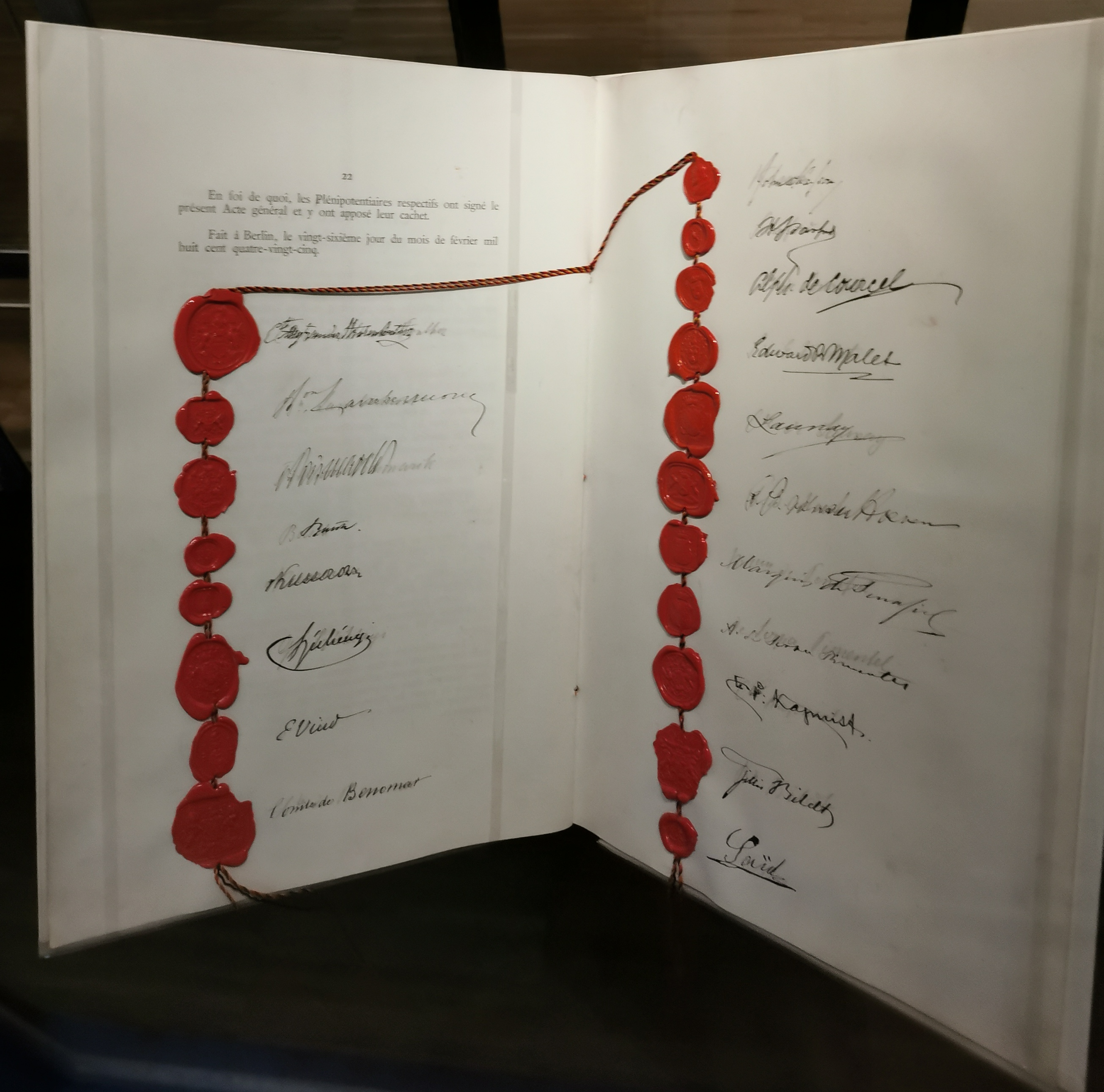
Seals and signatures on the Belgian copy of the General Act of the Berlin Conference (1885)

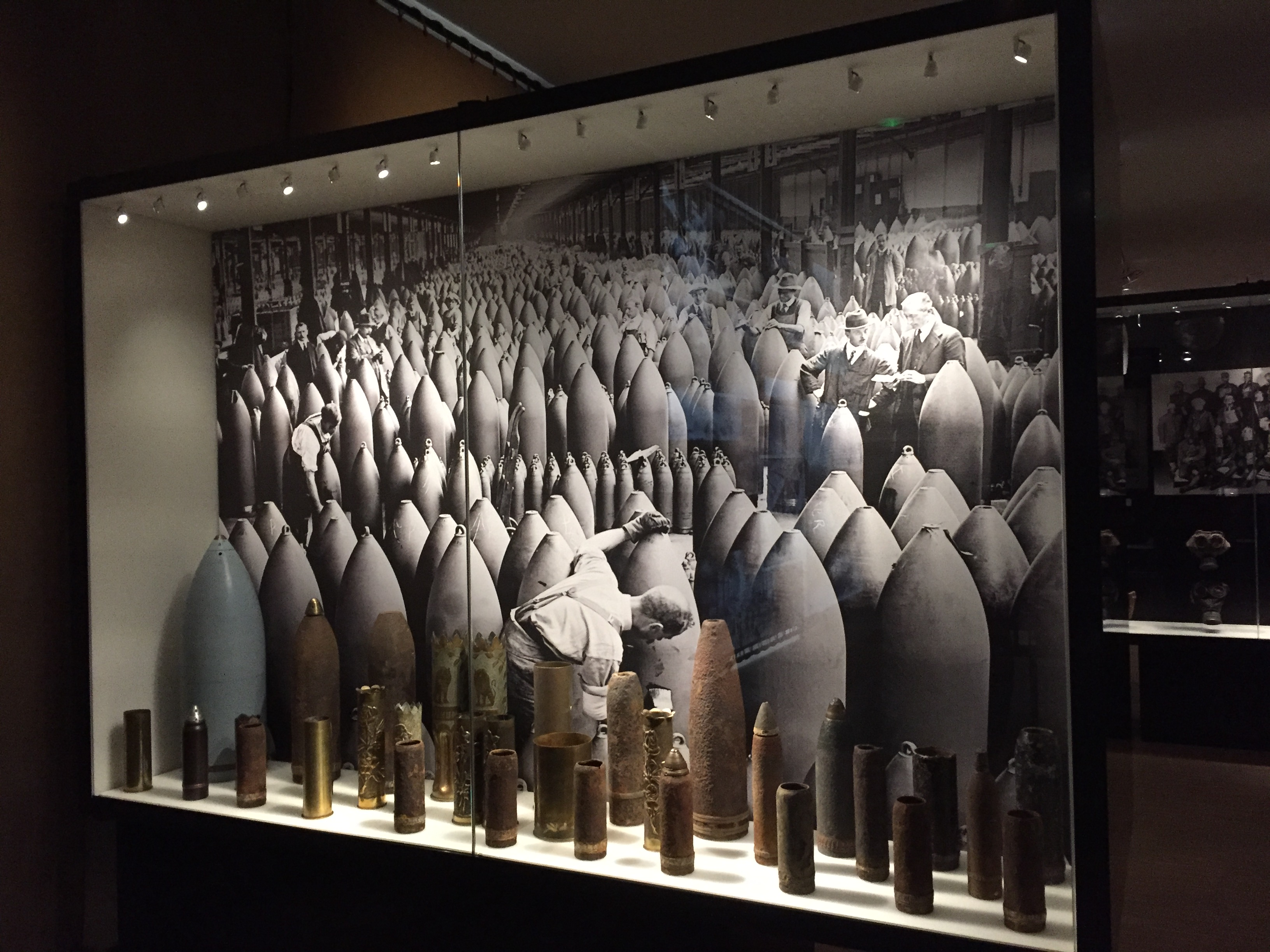
Bombshells from World War I, some converted into works of art by soldiers (1914–1918)

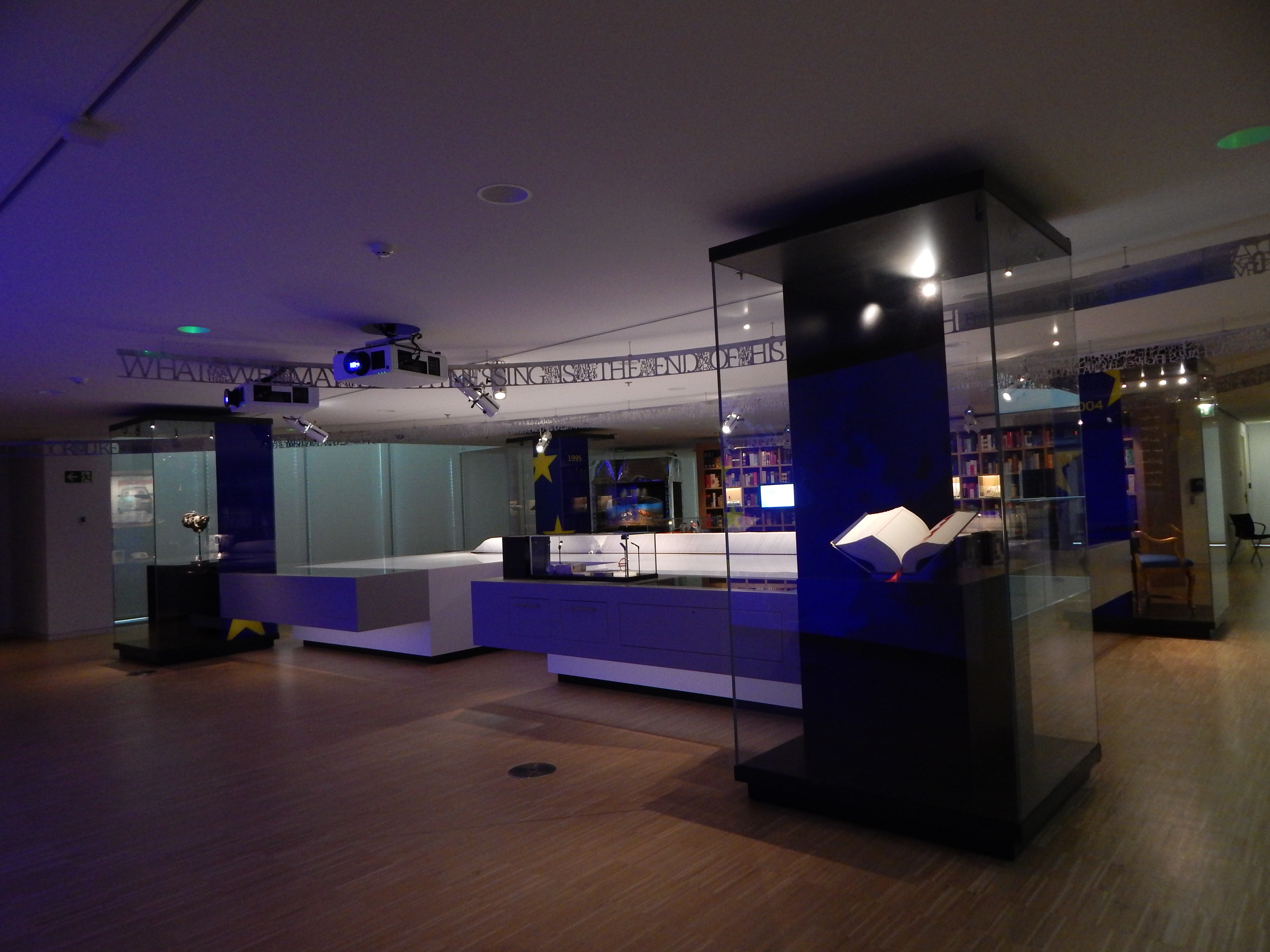
The Treaty of Rome (1957), the founding treaty of what is now the European Union (EU)

=== Temporary exhibitions ===
The House of European History's programme also includes a yearly temporary exhibition that provides the opportunity to expand upon or extend the themes and periods from the permanent exhibition. This allows for different or innovative types of exhibitions and varied content, in ways that are attractive to different audiences. As with the permanent exhibition, these temporary exhibitions take a transnational and interdisciplinary approach. They are in four languages (English, French, German and Dutch).

=== Digital ===
As part of the museum's mission to be accessible to audiences from across the continent and provide new means of conveying transnational history, a range of digital products has been launched.

== Location and accessibility ==
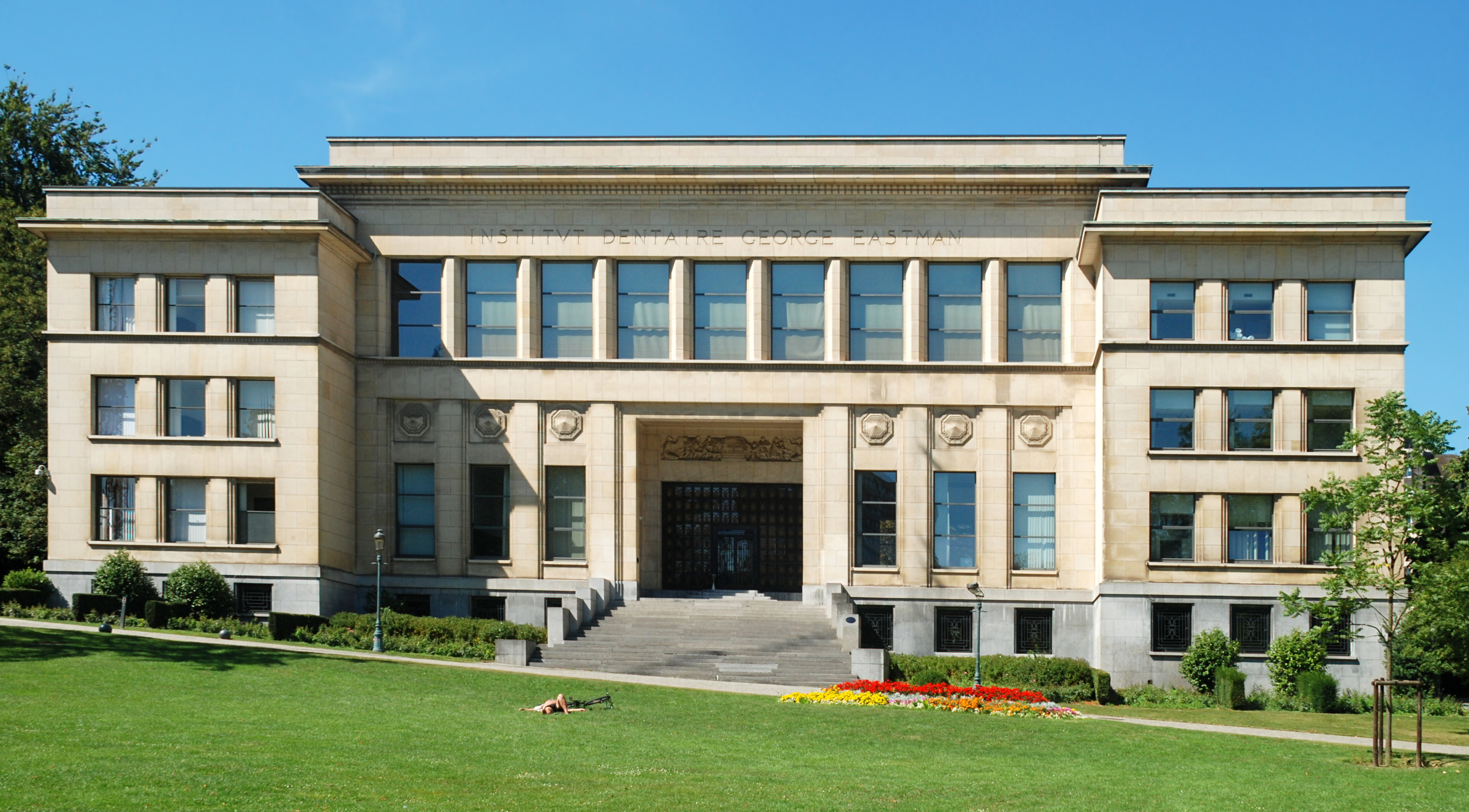
The former Eastman Dental Hospital pictured in 2009, before its refurbishment

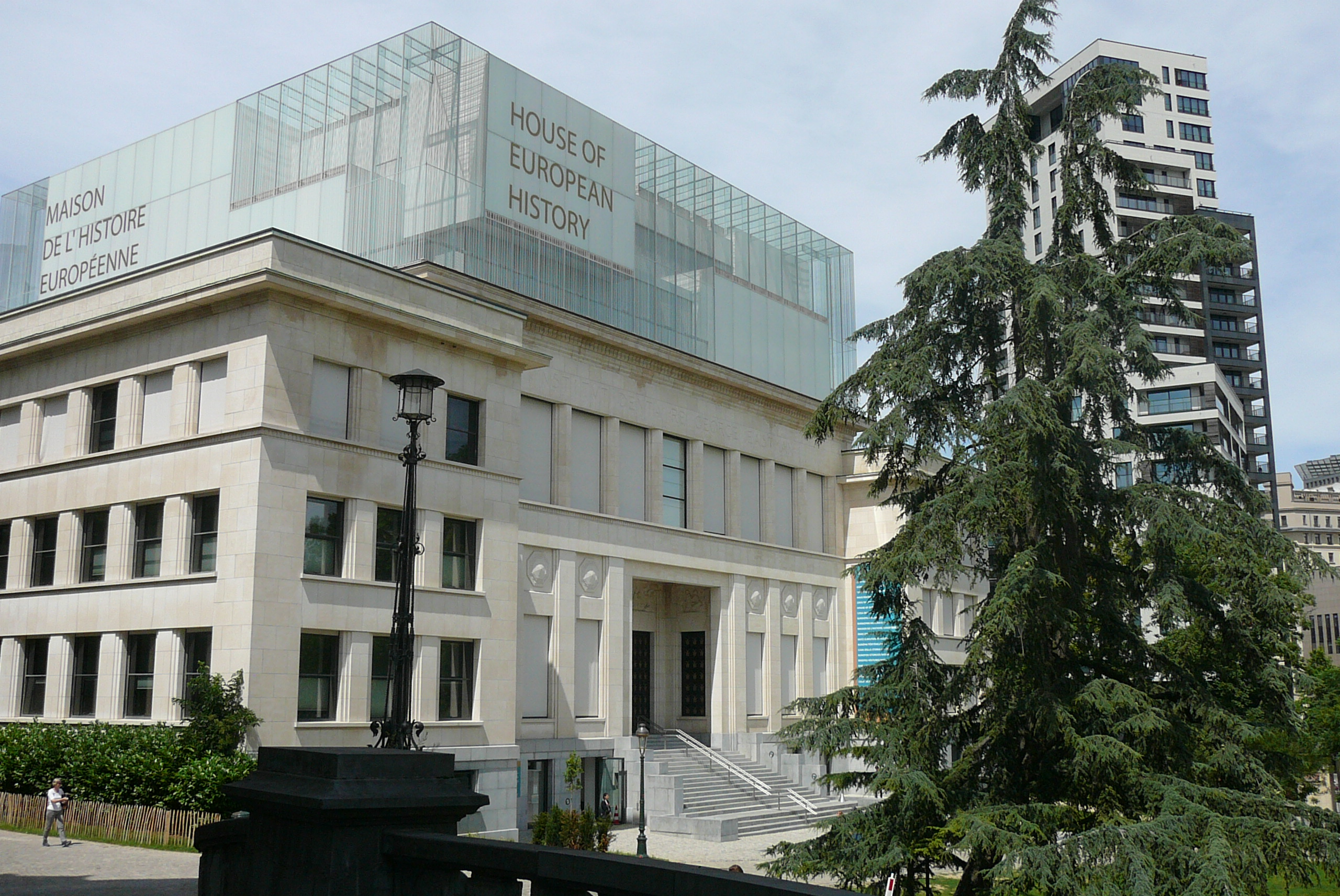
The building in 2017, following refurbishment, with the roof extension

The former Eastman Dental Hospital, originally designed to house a dental clinic, was named after George Eastman, the American philanthropist and inventor of the Kodak camera. His generous donations allowed the creation of dental centres in New York, London, Rome, Paris, Brussels and Stockholm, dedicated to providing free dental care for disadvantaged children.

In 1933, the Eastman Foundation commissioned the Swiss-Belgian architect Michel Polak, known for his Art Deco style and particularly the Résidence Palace in Brussels, to design the new building. Inaugurated in 1935, the building is notable both in terms of its engineering and its Art Deco elements. In the former children's waiting room, there is a series of murals by the painter Camille Barthélémy illustrating La Fontaine's Fables.

Leopold Park, which contains several historic buildings, such as the Pasteur Institute, the former Solvay School of Commerce, the Solvay Institute of Sociology, the Solvay Institute of Physiology, as well as the former Solvay Library, was listed in 1976. The Eastman Building itself is not listed. The dental clinic closed its doors before the building was converted into offices for the European institutions in the 1980s.

The museum is visitor-centred, wheelchair- and pushchair-friendly and open to all, in compliance with the European Parliament's policies relating to accessibility. To that end its main offers are presented via an interactive tablet in 24 languages, corresponding to the EU's official languages at the time of opening. Given that multilingualism is an expression of Europe's cultural diversity, the museum wants its visitors to experience its multilingual exhibits and services as one of the institution's main assets.

== Management and direction ==
The House of European History was created at the initiative of the European Parliament but is run independently. The museum is directed by a Board of Trustees, chaired by the former president of the European Parliament Hans-Gert Pöttering. Its members have included Étienne Davignon, Włodzimierz Borodziej, Miguel Angel Martinez, Gérard Onesta, Doris Pack, Chrysoula Paliadeli, Hans-Walter Hütter, Charles Picqué, Alain Lamassoure, Peter Sutherland, Androulla Vassiliou, Diana Wallis, Francis Wurtz, Mariya Gabriel, Rudi Vervoort, Pierluigi Castagnetti, Sabine Verheyen, Johan Van Overtveldt, Domènec Ruiz Deveza, Harald Rømer, Pedro Silva Pereira, Martin Hojsík, Iliana Ivanova, Reinhard Bütikofer, Assita Kanko, Dimitrios Papadimoulis, Oliver Rathkolb and Klaus Welle.

The Academic Committee, currently chaired by Oliver Rathkolb, comprises historians and museum curators. Its members have included Basil Kerski, John Erik Fossum, Constantin Iordachi, Emmanuelle Loyer, Sharon Macdonald, Daniela Preda, Kaja Širok, Luke van Middelaar, Daniele Wagener, Andreas Wirsching, Matti Klinge, Anita Meinarte, Hélène Miard-Delacroix, Mary Michailidou, Maria Schmidt, Anastasia Filippoupoliti, Louis Godart, Luisa Passerini, Wolfgang Schmale, Dietmar Preißler, Paul Basu, Gurminder K. Bhambra, Josep Maria Fradera, Olivette Otele and Steven van Hecke.

The academic team that is responsible for curating exhibitions is led by Constanze Itzel.

== Controversies ==
Since its initial conception, the House of European History project has been controversial, especially in the UK. The alleged "attempt to find a single unifying narrative of the histories of 27 disparate member states" has been criticised by the British think tank Civitas, saying "the House of European History can achieve nothing but a disingenuous paradox, aiming to tell the history of all the 27 states, but in fact relating no history at all."

More than the museum's contents, the museum's costs have come under fire. The costs were accused of having "more than doubled", the projects initial £58 million cost estimate were accused to have more than doubled to £137 million. Some criticised the spending during the Great Recession, including UKIP MEP Marta Andreasen who stated, in 2011, that "It defies both belief and logic that in this age of austerity MEPs have the vast sums of money to fund this grossly narcissistic project."

The museum's permanent exhibition was criticised by Platform of European Memory and Conscience, which accused the museum of favourable bias in relation to the portrayal of communism in the Eastern Bloc. The Acton Institute criticised the permanent exhibition for "erasing religion" as a factor in European history.

== See also ==
- Parlamentarium
- BELvue Museum
- European History Network
- List of museums in Brussels
- Art Deco in Brussels
- History of Brussels
