= Sociophysiology =

Sociophysiology is the "interplay between society and physical functioning" (Freund 1988: 856) involving "collaboration of two neighboring sciences: physiology and sociology" (Mauss 1936: 373). In other words, sociophysiology is physiological sociology, a special science that studies the physiological side of human (and other animals') interrelations (Zeliony 1912: 405–406).

== Interdisciplinary field of research ==
In addition to having been termed an "interdisciplinary area for research, an area which demonstrates the concomitant relationship between physiology and social behavior" (Di Mascio et al. 1955: 4), sociophysiology may also be described as "social ethology" and "social energetics" (Waxweiler 1906: 62). That is, the "physiology of reactive phenomena caused by the mutual excitations of individuals of the same species" (Waxweiler 1906: 62).

The interdisciplinary nature of sociophysiology largely entails a "synthesis of psychophysiology and social interaction" (Adler 2002: 884) such that a "socio-psycho-biological study" (Mauss 1936: 386) of "biologico-sociological phenomena" (Mauss 1936: 385) may ensue. Such "socio-psycho-biological study" has uncovered a "sharing of physiology between people involved in a meaningful interaction" (Adler 2002: 884), as well as "mutually responsive physiologic engagement having normative function in maintaining social cohesion and well-being in higher social animals" (Adler 2002: 885). This "mutually responsive physiologic engagement" brings into play the "close links uniting social phenomena to the biological phenomena from which they immediately derive" (Solvay 1906: 26).

== Interpersonal physiology ==
Furthermore, sociophysiology explores the "intimate relationship and mutual regulation between social and physiological systems that is especially vital in human groups" (Barchas 1986: 210). In other words, sociophysiology studies the "physio- and psycho-energetic phenomena at the basis of social groupings" (Solvay 1906: 25). Along these lines, Zeliony (1912) noted that

The changes of society are the result of the activities of the nervous system. Excitations vary with the same animal and with the same class of animals. The problem of the socio-physiologist is to find out what are the excitors and what the inhibitors. Physiology gives the laws of the nervous system.... Thus the duty of the socio-physiologist is to give a description of the nervous processes of groups which have resulted in changes in the [physical and social] environment.

— Georgii Pavlovich Zeliony, summarized in Ellwood, C. A. (1916). Objectivism in sociology. American Journal of Sociology, vol. 22, no. 3, p. 297–298.

In addition, sociophysiology "describes structure-function relationships for body structures and interactive functions relevant to psychiatric illness" (Gardner 1997: 351), and also "assumes that psychiatric disorders are pathological variants of the motivation, emotions, and conflict involved in normal communicational processes" (Gardner and Price 1999: 247–248). Psychiatry, thus, involves the diagnosis and treatment of what Lilienfeld (1879: 280) termed "physiological social pathology", and may be classed as a subfield of sociophysiology, called "pathological sociophysiology" by Zeliony (1912: 405). As summarized by Ellwood (1916), Zeliony thought that, in the future,

A socio-physiological pathology will become necessary. Its field of observation will be the deviations from the norm which are observed either as a result of the pathological differences in the organism or as a result of other conditions, as in the insane or those addicted to the use of alcohol.

— Georgii Pavlovich Zeliony, Ellwood, C. A. (1916). Objectivism in sociology. American Journal of Sociology, vol. 22, no. 3, p. 298.

Ellwood (1916: 298) also noted that Zeliony's future sociophysiology, being a natural biological science, must be Darwinian.

In short, sociophysiology is "reciprocal, interpersonal physiology" (Adler 2002: 885). Such interpersonal physiology may have implications in the realm of human politics. For example, the findings of a recent study "suggest that political attitudes vary with physiological traits linked to divergent manners of experiencing and processing environmental threats" (Oxley et al. 2008: 1669).

== See also ==
- Biological psychology
- Ethology
- Evolutionary psychology
- Physiological psychology
- Psychophysiology
- Social interaction
- Social psychology
- Sociobiology
- Sociophysics
- G. P. Zeliony

== Sources ==
- Adler, H. M. (2002). The sociophysiology of caring in the doctor–patient relationship. Journal of General Internal Medicine, vol. 17, no. 11, pp. 883–890.
- Barchas, P. R. (1986). A sociophysiological orientation to small groups. In E. J. Lawler, ed., Advances in Group Processes, vol. 3, pp. 209–246. Greenwich, CT: JAI Press.
- Di Mascio, A., Boyd, R. W., Greenblatt, M., and H. C. Solomon. (1955). The psychiatric interview (a sociophysiologic study). Diseases of the Nervous System, vol. 16, no. 1, pp. 4–9.
- Ellwood, C. A. (1916). Objectivism in sociology. American Journal of Sociology, vol. 22, no. 3, pp. 289–305.
- Freund, P. E. S. (1988). Bringing society into the body: Understanding socialized human nature. Theory and Society, vol. 17, no. 6, pp. 839–864.
- Gardner Jr., R. J. (1997). Sociophysiology as the basic science of psychiatry. Theoretical Medicine, vol. 18, no. 4, pp. 335–356.
- Gardner Jr., R. J., and J. S. Price. (1999). Sociophysiology and depression. In T. E. Joiner and J. C. Coyne, eds., The Interactional Nature of Depression: Advances in Interpersonal Approaches. Washington, DC: American Psychological Association.
- Lilienfeld, P. (1879). Die sociale Physiologie. Volume 4 of Gedanken über die Socialwissenschaft der Zukunft. Mitau: E. Behre's Verlag.
- Mauss, M. (1936). Les techniques du corps. Journal de Psychologie, vol. 32, nos. 3–4, 15 mars – 15 avril 1936. Reprinted in M. Mauss, Sociologie et anthropologie, Paris: PUF, 1950, pp. xxx-xxx. doi:10.1522/cla.mam.tec
- Oxley, D. R. et al. (2008). Political attitudes vary with physiological traits. Science 19 September 2008: Vol. 321. no. 5896, pp. 1667–1670. doi:10.1126/science.1157627
- Solvay, E. (1906). Note sur des formules d’introduction à l’énergétique physio- et psycho-sociologique. Fascicule 1 des Notes et Mémoires de l’Institut de Sociologie, Instituts Solvay, Parc Léopold, Bruxelles. Bruxelles et Leipzig: Misch et Thron.
- Waxweiler, E. (1906). Esquisse d’une sociologie. Fascicule 2 des Notes et Mémoires de l’Institut de Sociologie, Instituts Solvay, Parc Léopold, Bruxelles. Bruxelles et Leipzig: Misch et Thron.
- Zeliony, G. P. (1912). Über die zukünftige Soziophysiologie. Archiv für Rassen- und Gesellschafts-Biologie, vol. 9, no. 4, pp. 405–429.
