= Solvay Institute of Sociology =

Sociology Institute in Brussels, Belgium

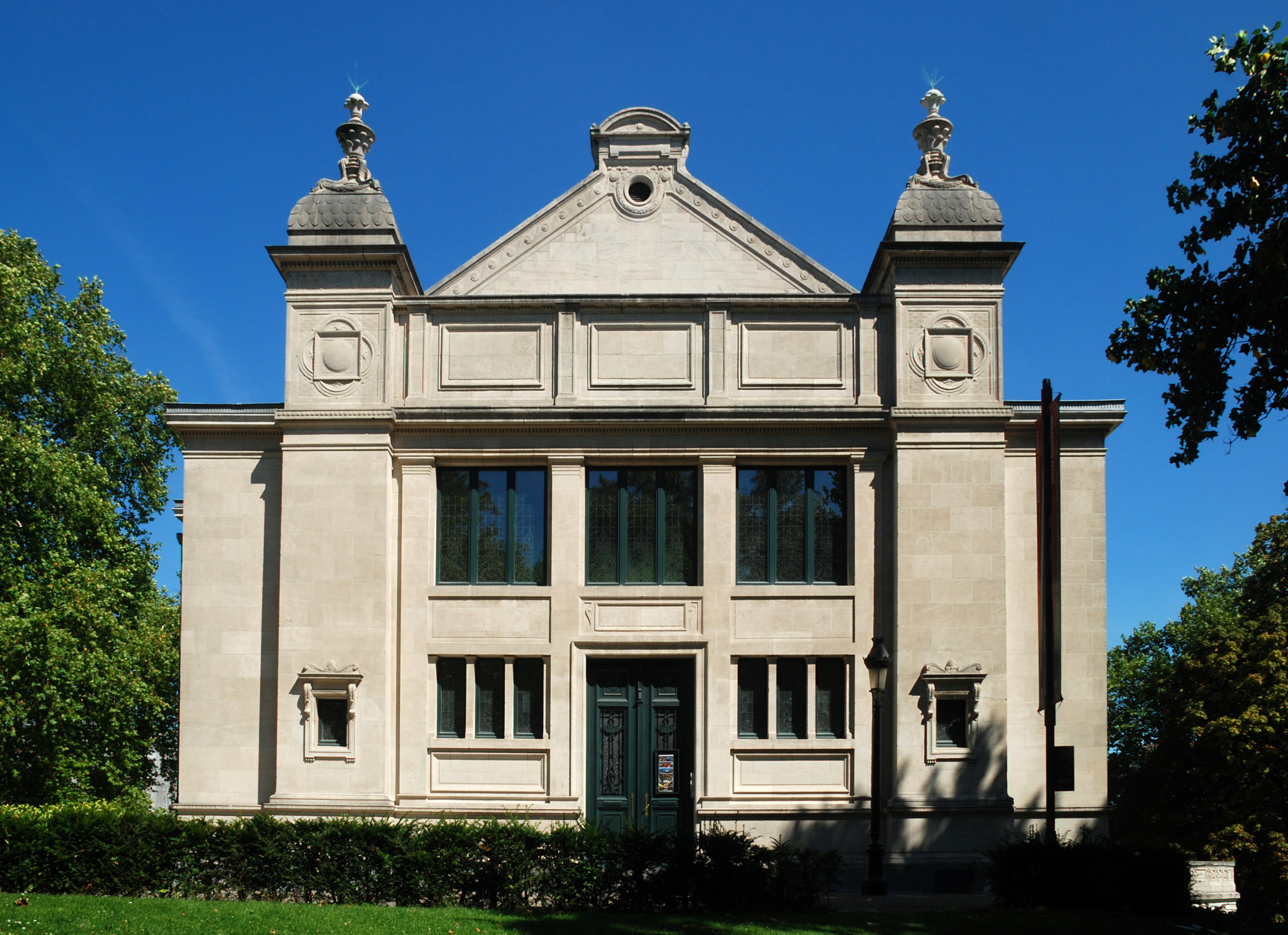
The Solvay Institute of Sociology in Leopold Park, Brussels, was inaugurated on 16 November 1902, renovated in 1994, and now holds the Bibliothèque Solvay.

The Solvay Institute of Sociology (French: Institut de Sociologie Solvay; abbreviated SIS) is a sociology institute in Brussels, Belgium. It assumed its first "definitive form" on 16 November 1902, when its founder Ernest Solvay, a wealthy Belgian chemist, industrialist, and philanthropist, inaugurated the original edifice of SIS in Leopold Park. Under the guidance of its first director, Emile Waxweiler, SIS expressed a "conception of a sociology open to all of the disciplines of the human sciences: ethnology, of course, but also economics [...] and psycho-physiology, contact with which was facilitated by the proximity of the Institute of Physiology".

While SIS is now part of the Université libre de Bruxelles (ULB) and known more simply as that university's Institute of Sociology (French: Institut de Sociologie), the approach instigated by Solvay and Waxweiler still serves as methodological framework: a synergy between basic and applied research involving interdisciplinary studies firmly anchored in social life.

== Institutional history ==
In 1894, Solvay established ISS (Gaspari 2002: 602; IS 2005). In addition, in 1897, Solvay gave to "the School of Political and Social Sciences annexed to the University of Brussels, a sum sufficient to assure its existence over three years" (Rey 1903: 196). However, in 1901, as a reflection of his views about the "close links which [...] unite sociological phenomena to the biological phenomena from which they immediately derive" (Solvay 1902/1906: 26), Solvay disbanded ISS in order to organize SIS along lines more directly and intimately attached to those of the Solvay Institute of Physiology [SIP; Institut de Physiologie Solvay] he had created in 1891 (Solvay 1902/1906: 26; Vatin 1996: 486; Gaspari 2002: 602; Ducenne 2004; IS 2005). SIS was due to become property of the Université libre de Bruxelles twenty-five years after its creation (Rey 1903: 196); this transfer actually occurred only twenty-one years later, in 1923 (Anonymous 1960: 213).

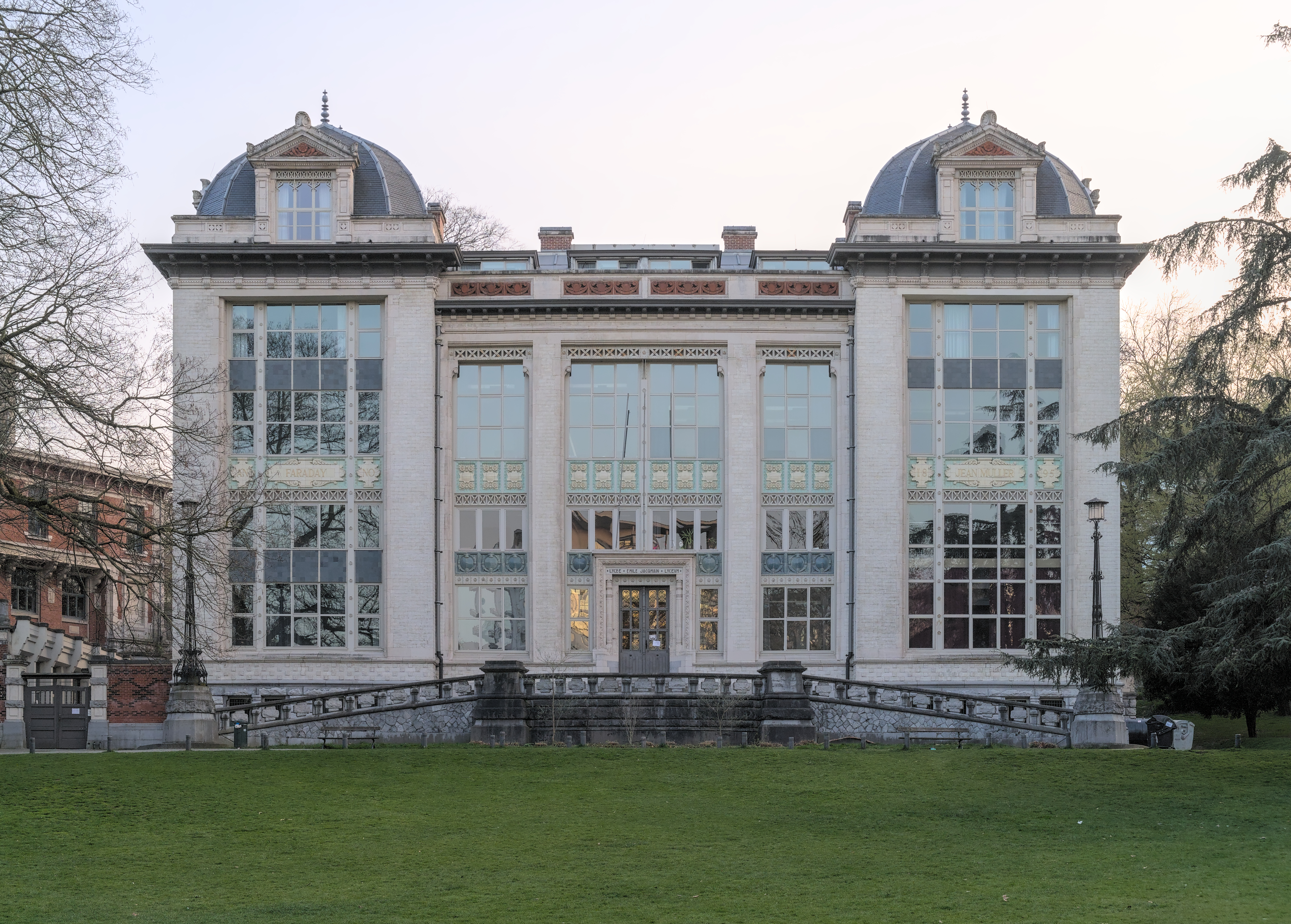
The Solvay Institute of Sociology's sister institution, the Institute of Physiology, was completed in 1894.

Designed by Belgian architects Constant Bosmans and Henri Vandeveld, SIS was built on a hillside in Leopold Park not far from its sister, SIP, which latter had been designed by Jules-Jacques Van Ysendijck and completed between 1892–1894 (CRM 2000: II; Ducenne 2004; BS 2006).

From its inauguration in 1902, Émile Waxweiler, "one of Belgium's leading thinkers" (Sarton 1917: 168), was installed as the first director of SIS. Waxweiler retained this post until his sudden and accidental death in 1916 (Sarton 1917: 168).

According to George Sarton, SIS "soon became one of the most hospitable places in Belgium: if a stranger applied for admission, nobody ever inquired into his religious or political ideas; all willing workers, big or small, were welcome. Waxweiler had taken great pains to organize this institute, to make of its library, catalogue, and collections an almost perfect instrument, to give to it that atmosphere of freedom and scholarship which is in itself an inspiration" (Sarton 1917: 168).

Sarton (1917: 168) furthermore states that the point of view guiding SIS during Waxweiler's time was "essentially functional," involving "the consideration of social facts, not under their formal, external, descriptive aspect, but rather under their genetic, internal, explanatory aspect."

The ambitious course of research which SIS had embarked upon under Waxweiler's guidance may readily be summarized by the rubrics under which his Archives Sociologiques arrayed and reviewed new works contributing either to the progress of human sociology or to its introduction (cited in Sch. 1912: 37):

- Introduction
  - Energetics and general biology in their relations with sociology [Energétique et biologie générale dans leurs rapports avec la Sociologie]
  - Ethology of interindividual relations among living beings other than humans [Ethologie des rapports interindividuels chez les êtres vivants autres que les hommes]
  - Human and comparative physiology and psychology in their relations to sociology [Physiologie et psychologie humaines et comparées dans leurs rapports avec la Sociologie]
- Human Sociology
  - Social accommodation [Accommodation sociale]
  - Social organisation [Organisation sociale]
  - Doctrine and method [Doctrine et méthode]

In addition, thanks to Solvay's largesse, Waxweiler's expansive vision, and its implantation in an architectural space of its own, SIS — utilizing modern methodologies from its very beginning — was never enthralled by any particular school of thought, such as that cast by Durkheim on the bulk of Francophone sociology, and functioned as "a true 'laboratory,' conducting in-depth inquiries, often involving statistical instrumentation, on the conditions of urban life, labor organisation, economic development, or even the ethnography of the Belgian Congo" (Vatin 1996: 486).

Following Waxweiler's death in 1916, SIS was run jointly by Maurice Anciaux and Georges Barnich until 1920, thence by Barnich and Georges Hostelet until 1923 (IS 2007), when the institute, in accordance with Solvay's original plan (Rey 1903: 196), was ceded to the Université libre de Bruxelles (Anonymous 1960: 213).

It seems that during the time Barnich and Hostelet served as directors, SIS was not immune to the eugenical movement that was inflaming minds the world over throughout the 1920s. In early October 1922, for example, The International Commission of Eugenics met in Brussels, where the commission's chairman, Major Leonard Darwin, gave an address entitled "L'Eugénique" at SIS, as did a Professor Doctor Winner [or Wimmer] of Copenhagen, on "Mental Heredity" (Anonymous 1922: 626). On Tuesday, October 10, a meeting in the "large hall" of SIS inaugurated the institute's "eugenics room" (Anonymous 1922: 626-627). In early 1923, apparently, this "small room" became the Belgian National Office of Eugenics (Anonymous 1923).

Following its incorporation into the Université libre de Bruxelles, the directors of the Institute of Sociology have been eight in number: Ernest Mahaim (1923–1935), Georges Smets (1935–1952), Henri Janne (1952–1959), Arthur Doucy (1959–1980), Nicole Delruelle-Vosswinkel (1980–1989), Jacques Nagels (1989–1998), Alain Eraly (1998–2003), and currently, since 2003, Firouzeh Nahavandi (IS 2007).

== Publication history ==
=== Notes et Mémoires ===
Along with the documents relating to the establishment of SIS, Solvay presented an essay, Note sur des formules d'introduction à l'énergétique physio- et psycho-sociologique (in-8°, 55 pages; Bruxelles, Lamertin), which sketched an introduction to the "physio-sociological and psycho-sociological energetics" that SIS, with Waxweiler at the helm, was entailed conjointly to explore with SIP (Rey 1903; Solvay 1902/1906; IS 2007). Four years later, Solvay reissued this essay as the first fascicule of the Institute's in-4° series of publications, Notes et Mémoires [Notes and Monographs] (Solvay 1902/1906).

Abel Rey's 1903 review of this essay, though lauding the remarkable ends to which Solvay put his fortune — an example he wished others in France as well as in Belgium would follow — was highly critical:

One would be tempted to continue approving him without reserve in regards his scientific conceptions, if their foundation was, as he says, the application to the social sciences of the fruitful and proven methods of physical chemistry and biology, since everyone believes that this entails the methods of minute observation and experimental comparison which have provided these sciences with their bases and their inductions. Unfortunately, it is not so, and from the start M. Solvay would formulate a deductive sociological method, analogous to that of mathematical physics, or of chemical mechanics, and still without analogue in the field of biology, unless it be in the singular concepions of the author (Rey 1903: 196).

We believe, in effect, that psycho-sociological phenomena are of such a complexity that they resist any effort of analysis in [Solvay's] sense. And if ever we succeed in reducing them to elements so simple as to treat them in a wholly mechanical fashion, which is perhaps possible, though in a distant future, the relevant laws will be formulated without a doubt in a much more complicated way, and will arrive at results completely different from the simplistic results we have just examined [in Solvay's essay]. May we express a wish? That is, that the Solvay Institute employ its resources and the work of its students in a patient and minute observation of social phenomena. May it do good historical work, make good use of the comparative method; may it collect documents and may it critique them; may it engage itself in serious statistical enquiries, leaving aside a premature generalisation, and an illusory assimilation of the social sciences with the physical-chemical sciences. Mathematical systematisation will come, when it is able, much later, without doubt very much later (Rey 1903: 199-199).

It seems that SIS did indeed take Rey's wish to heart, and follow his advice.

=== Études sociales ===
In addition to the large-format Notes et Mémoires begun in 1906, SIS had earlier (1904) begun publication of two smaller series, Études sociales [Social Studies] in-8° and Actualités sociales [Social Current Events] in-16° (Solvay 1902/1906: frontispiece).

In 1906, the list of publications in the Social Studies series comprised:

1. Les syndicats industriels en Belgique, par G. De Leener, 2^{e} édition, revue et augmentée, 1904.
2. De l'esprit du gouvernement démocratique: Essai de science politique, par A. Prins, 1906.
3. Les concessions et les régies communales en Belgique, par E. Brees, 1906.

=== Actualités sociales ===
The object of this in-16° series was to make available, in language accessible to the layman, works pertaining to the growth of human productivity. By February 1906, the following works had been published in this series (Solvay 1902/1906: frontispiece):

1. Principes d'orientation sociale, résumé des études de M. Ernest Solvay sur le Productivisme et le Comptabilisme, 2^{e} édition, 1904.
2. Que faut-il faire de nos industries à domicile? par M. Ansiaux, 1904.
3. Le charbon dans le nord de la Belgique. Le point de vue technique, G. De Leener. Le point de vue juridique, L. Wodon. Le point de vue économique et social, par E. Waxweiler, 1904.
4. Le procès du libre-échange en Angleterre, par D. Crick, 1904.
5. Entraînement et fatigue au point de vue militaire, par J. Joteyko, 1905.
6. L'augmentation du rendement de la machine humaine, par L. Querton, 1905.
7. Assurance et assistance mutuelles au point de vue médical, par le même, 1905.
8. Les sociétés anonymes : abus et remèdes, par T. Théate, 1905.
9. La lutte contre la dégénérescence en Angleterre, par M. Boulenger et N. Ensch, 1905.

=== Bulletin Mensuel and Archives sociologiques ===
In January 1910, Waxweiler, as editor the institute's Bulletin Mensuel [Monthly Bulletin] (Anonymous 1911: 552), began overseeing reviews of the works he was acquiring for the institute's Archives sociologiques [Sociological Archives], which had been started in order "to apply the new sociological point of view introduced by him [in Waxweiler 1906] to as many topics as possible, in order to test it, to fix a new orientation, and also to render the new way of thinking more subtle and fruitful" (Sarton 1917: 168). The institute's Bulletin Mensuel was "in the strictest sense a scientific periodical, being devoted to the review of all articles and books which contribute in any way to the explanation of the phenomena of the social life, whether they are published under the titles of biology, physiology, psychology, or those of the several social sciences, history, law, political economy, science of religions, ethnography and sociology" (Anonymous 1911: 552). The first, more substantial half of the Bulletin published extensive critical reviews and discussions of recent additions — whether books or articles — to the Archives, while the second half consisted simply of lists of works and shorter reviews (Anonymous 1911: 552; Sch. 1912: 37).

For instance, the first part of the February 1911 issue of the Bulletin contained the following articles (Tenney 1911: 348):

- The organization of social life among termites
- The adaptation of mentally abnormal individuals to society
- The influence of the social environment upon the lower classes in great cities
- The influence of "conventionality" in the appreciation of works of art
- Why war, from the point of view of the psychology of conflict, is becoming less destructive of human life in spite of development in armaments
- Group organization on the basis of common interests
- The rôle of personal names in primitive organization
- The conditions determining the modification of the technique of a primitive people, when influenced by contact with a semi-civilized population
- The determination by environment of the direction of technical invention
- The evolution of ideas which sustain classes and the social hierarchy
- Conscious and unconscious modes of transmitting rituals
- The function of human instinct and that of the social environment in the development of morals
- A sociological interpretation of a new jurisprudence
- On the sociological conception of law
- Geography and sociology
- Certain applications of the comparative method in the history of art.

While the issue published in April of the same year contained the following critical reviews and discussions (Anonymous 1911: 553):

- Variations in the effects of cerebral lesions of the same localization, according to the degreeof culture of individuals
- Mental reactions and social reactions
- Evolution and revolution in epochs of social reorganization
- Persistence of primitive organization in English society of the Middle Ages
- The determinism of successive adaptations in the financial administration of the Romans
- Conflict of adaptations in social evolution
- Concerning the connections between technical inventions and their influence upon the organization of industry
- Concerning the rôle of manufacturing on a large scale upon the concentration of certain industrie
- An example of the theoretic exaggeration of the social power of money
- The formation of oligarchies in political parties
- The rôle of Iogical systems in the movements of opinion
- The apparent social character of prayer
- The influence of political factors upon the evolution of religions
- The evolution of assemblies
- The conditions of the penetration of new ideas in primitive mentality
- The rôle of sociology and that of statistics in the explanation of social facts (a review of Charles A. Ellwood's Sociology and Modern Social Problems)

== See also ==
- Solvay Conference
- Emile Waxweiler

== Notes and references ==
=== References ===
- [Anonymous]. (1911). [Review of: Bulletin Mensuel de l'Institut de Sociologie Solvay, edited by Emile Waxweiler.] The American Economic Review, vol. 1, no. 3, pp. 552–553.
- [Anonymous]. (1922). The International Commission of Eugenics. Science, New Series, vol. 56, no. 1457, pp. 626–627.
- [Anonymous]. (1923). The National Office of Eugenics in Belgium. Science, New Series, vol. 57, no. 1463, p. 46.
- [Anonymous]. (1960). L'Institut de Sociologie Solvay. Revue Française de Sociologie, vol. 1, no. 2, pp. 213–215.
- Bibliothèque Solvay [BS]. (2006). Historique.
- Collège Royal des Médecins de l'agglomeration bruxelloise [CRM]. (2000). Le visage de la médecine: Un siècle d'architecture hospitalière à Bruxelles. Colmed Info, no. 981, Avril-Mai 2000, pp. I-III.
- Ducenne, C. (2004). Le parc Léopold.
- Gaspari, O. (2002). Cities against states? Hopes, dreams and shortcomings of the European Municipal Movement, 1900-1960. Contemporary European History, vol. 11, no. 4, pp. 597–621.
- Institut de Sociologie [IS]. (2005). Vivre ensemble au XXIème siècle. Brochure of the Colloque international de l'Institut de Sociologie, 6-7 octobre 2005. See also Calenda.
- Institut de Sociologie [IS]. (2007). Bienvenue sur le site de l'Institut de Sociologie.
- Rey, A. (1903). [Review of Solvay 1902/1906]. Revue philosophique de la France et de l'étranger, année 28, tome 55, pp. 196–199.
- Sarton, G. (1917). Emile Waxweiler (1867–1916). The Nation, vol. 104, no. 2693, pp. 168–169.
- Sch., Th. (1912). [Compte rendu du Bulletin mensuel (no. 15, mai 1911) de l'Institut de Sociologie Solvay.] Revue critique d'histoire et de littérature, année 46, semestre 1, tome 73, pp. 36–37.
- Solvay, E. (1902/1906). Note sur des formules d'introduction à l'énergétique physio- et psycho-sociologique. Bruxelles: Lamertin, in-8°, 55 pages,1902. Fascicule 1 des Notes et Mémoires de l'Institut de Sociologie, Instituts Solvay, Parc Léopold, Bruxelles. Bruxelles et Leipzig: Misch et Thron, in-4°, 26 pages, 1906.
- Tenney, A. A. (1911). [Review of: Le Bulletin Mensuel de l'Institut de Sociologie Solvay. Edited by Emile Waxweiler, director of the Institute.] Political Science Quarterly, vol. 26, no. 2, pp. 347–348.
- Vatin, F. (1996). [Review of: L'univers de la sociologie en Belgique de 1900 à 1940, by Jean-François Crombois.] Revue Française de Sociologie, vol. 37, no. 3, pp. 485–487.
- Waxweiler, E. (1906). Esquisse d'une sociologie. Fascicule 2 des Notes et Mémoires de l'Institut de Sociologie, Instituts Solvay, Parc Léopold, Bruxelles. Bruxelles et Leipzig: Misch et Thron, in-4°, 306 pages.
