= Security & Defence Agenda =

Belgian think tank

The Security & Defence Agenda (SDA) was a security and defence think-tank based in Brussels. Its activities included debates, international conferences and a range of publications. In October 2014, most of the activities of the SDA were incorporated into the Friends of Europe think-tank.

The Security & Defence Agenda (SDA) provided a neutral meeting point for defence and security specialists from NATO and the EU. The SDA developed into a new forum for the discussion of defence and security policies. With the rapidly evolving nature of the security environment, the SDA championed new ways of consulting global opinion on security issues, including the world's only mass-participation online security policy event, the Security Jam, and its Cyber-Security Initiative.

The Security Jam continues to be run by Friends of Europe. This brings together participants and from the security sector at large – civilians and military from national governments, international organisations, NGOs, think-tanks, academia, business and the media. The Jam aims to develop solutions to global security challenges.

The SDA welcomed high-ranking personalities from the world of security and defence, including US Defense Secretary Robert Gates. Recep Tayyip Erdoğan, Anders Fogh Rasmussen, Cecilia Malmström, Neelie Kroes, Pauline Neville-Jones, Alexander Vershbow, General James L. Jones, Elmar Mammadyarov and many others.

== Advisory board ==
The SDA received guidance from its Advisory Board, led by Jaap De Hoop Scheffer and Javier Solana.

Members included:

- Gen. Stéphane Abrial
- Claude-France Arnould
- Gen. Knud Bartels
- Gilles de Kerchove
- Giampaolo Di Paola
- Ambassador Hüseyin Diriöz
- Bates Gill
- Frederick Kempe
- Brig. Gen. Ilkka Laitinen
- Janusz Onyszkiewicz
- Ioan Mircea Pascu
- Mikhail Remizov
- Walter Stevens
- Leendert van Bochoven
- Geoffrey Van Orden
- Lt. Gen. Ton van Osch
- Alexander Vershbow
- Pierre Vimont
- Veronika Wand-Danielsson

The Director of the SDA was Giles Merritt, who is also Secretary-General of the think-tank Friends of Europe and Editor of the policy journal Europe's World.
