= Emile Waxweiler =

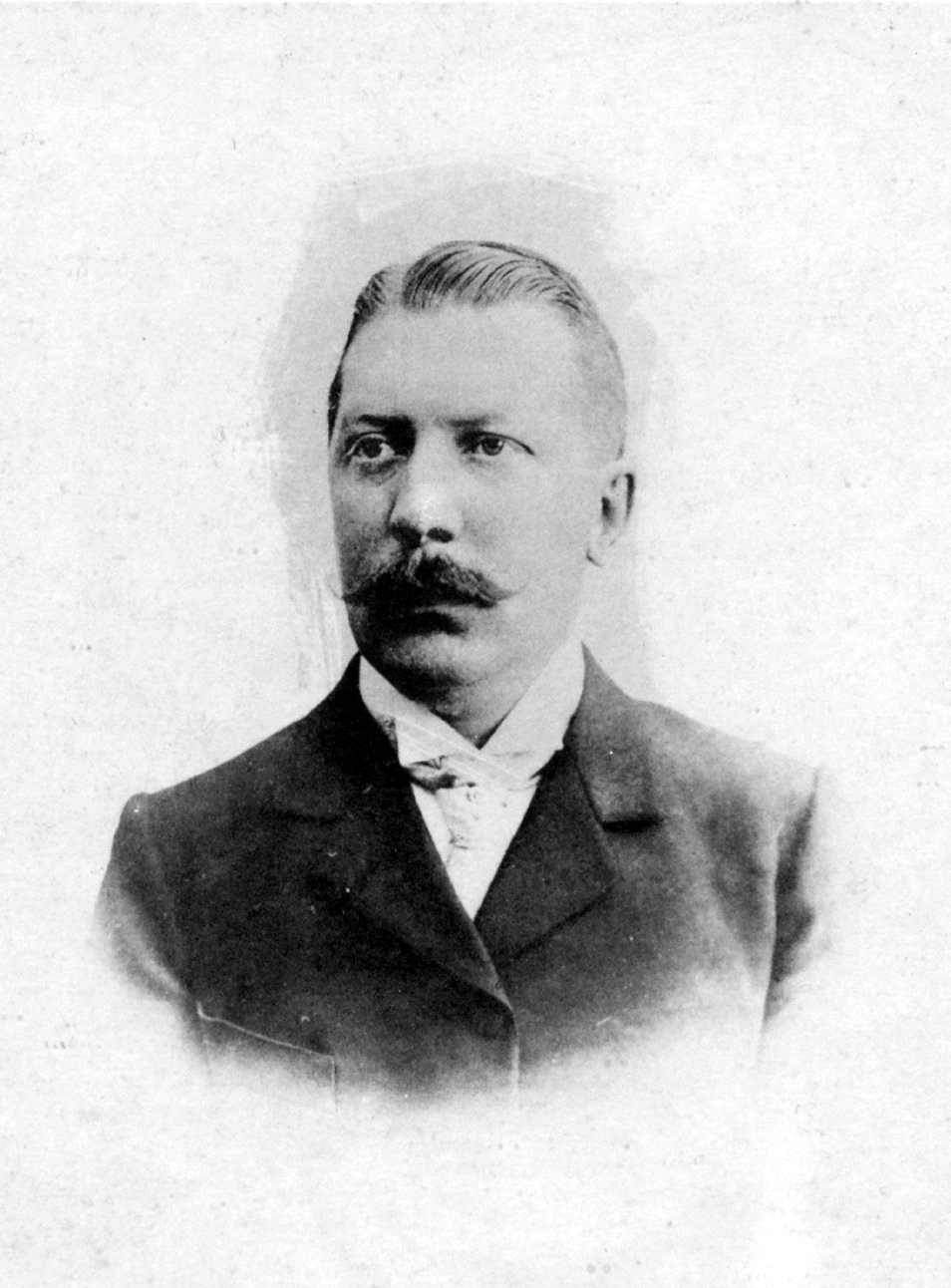
Photograph of Waxweiler

Emile Waxweiler (1867–1916) was a Belgian engineer and sociologist. He was a member of the Royal Academy of Belgium and the International Institute of Statistics (Sarton 1917: 168).

Waxweiler was born in Mechelen, Belgium, 22 May 1867, and died in a street accident in London, where he was attached to the London School of Economics, in late June 1916 (Sarton 1917: 168).

Waxweiler's education included taking the “highest degree” in engineering from the University of Ghent, and spending a year in the United States, where he studied labor questions and industrial organization (Sarton 1917: 168). In 1895, he was appointed head of the statistics section of the Belgian Office of Labor, and from 1897 on, Waxweiler taught courses in political and financial economics, statistics and demographics, as well as descriptive sociology, at the Université libre de Bruxelles (Sauveur 1924: 395–396). However, these teaching obligations did not prevent him from serving, beginning in 1901–1902, as director of the Solvay Institute of Sociology (Sarton 1917: 168; Sauveur 1924: 395).

In addition to his career-long emphasis on the importance of statistics as an analytical tool for all of the life sciences (Sauveur 1924: 397; Waxweiler 1909a), Waxweiler's major scientific contribution was his conception of sociology as a subfield of biology, in particular, ethology (Waxweiler 1906). In his Esquisse d’une sociologie of 1906, Waxweiler defined sociology (along with its alternative names of “social ethology” and “social energetics”), as “the science, one could almost say, the physiology of reactive phenomena caused by the mutual excitations of individuals of the same species, without distinctions of sex” (Waxweiler 1906: 62–63).

Furthermore, Waxweiler early on advocated a system of profit-sharing by which employees become co-partners with their employers (Waxweiler 1898; Gide 1899: 240; Willoughby 1899: 121), and also argued for compulsory education laws and limits on child labor in Belgium (McLean and Waxweiler 1906).

In the final two years of his life, Waxweiler published two popular books dealing with Germany's invasion of Belgium in 1914 (Waxweiler 1915; 1916).

== Esquisse d’une sociologie ==
Waxweiler's Esquisse d’une sociologie [Sketch of a sociology] was published as the second fascicule of the Solvay Institute of Sociology’s Notes et Mémoires series. As George Sarton (1924: 168) explained, “The Esquisse displayed a vast programme of research that Waxweiler had been obliged to outline as a working basis for the Institute of Sociology. This Institute had been founded a few years before, thanks to Ernest Solvay’s munificence, and entrusted to Waxweiler in 1902.”

The Esquisse, along with the other fascicules of the Notes et Mémoires series published by the Solvay Institute of Sociology in 1906, was reviewed by A. F. Chamberlain in the April 1907 issue of the American Journal of Psychology:

In his “Outlines of Sociology,” Emile Waxweiler, who is a professor of the University of Brussels, treats, in the first part, of sociology (adaptation to environment, living milieu and social milieu, sociological phenomena in comparative sociology) and, in the second, sociological analysis (sources and method, social formation, social aptitudes, activities and synergies). Professor Waxweiler defines “social ethology,” or “sociology,” since that term already exists, as “the science, or rather, the physiology of the reactional phenomena due to the mutual excitations of individuals of the same species without distinction of sex.” The basis of social affinity is the “impression of organic likeness (similitude),” and the evolution of man’s nervous system has determined characteristic phenomena from the sociological point of view,—”the faculty of perceiving inter-individually specific likeness of organization proceeds on a par with what is called the manifestations of intelligence, i. e., with the complexity of the nervous system” (p. 74). More and more has man become “the animal formed by the other individuals of his species.” [...] The only activities of the individual which interest the sociologist are his external activities, and those only in so far as they “produce effectively in another individual of the same species, without distinction of sex, a certain reaction” (p. 169). Activities are distinguished as conjunctive, protective, injurious, competitive, divulgative, gregarious, repetitive, initiative, acquisitive, selective; the social synergies a[s] conformity, interdependence, cephalization, co-ordination, conscience, etc. There is much interesting matter in this volume and the bibliography (pages 297–306, 2 cols. to page) proves the author’s wide reading,—he has made good use of the Pedagogical Seminary and the writings of American devotees of “child study.” But for all this his book is, as he terms it, properly enough, “a sketch.” A useful feature is the “sociological dictionary” (pages 281–295) containing some 2,200 terms without definitions, of more or less sociological import, gleaned from the vocabulary of the French language (Chamberlain 1907: 261–262).

A. W. Small’s review in the November 1906 issue of the American Journal of Sociology, however, took a dimmer view of this last-mentioned “sociological dictionary:”

There is a curious appearance of something short of precision in the “Lexique sociologique,” appended to the volume. This glossary contains upwards of 2,400 words without definition or explanation, “Susceptibles de suggérer directement un phénomène sociologique c’est-à-dire un phénomène réactionnel entre deux ou plusieurs individus de la même espèce, sans distinction de sex” (!). Why the invidious distinction in favor of these 2,400 terms, and against the remaining thousands in the vocabulary? Whether a syllable of human speech suggests a sociological reaction to our mind does not depend upon the syllable, but upon our knowledge of its history. As phenomena of human association words are of one common origin, and if they do not suggest sociological relations it is our fault. Such a list would be absolutely useless, except as a measure of the sociological suggestibility of a given individual (Small 1906: 425).

On the other hand, Joseph Schumpeter, writing in the pages of the Economic Journal, called Waxweiler's Sketch one “of the few which really advance the science” (Schumpeter 1907: 109), as well as “a book which ought not to be overlooked by anyone interested in sociology, or even in social science in general” (Schumpeter 1907: 111).

== Notes and references ==
=== Waxweiler bibliography ===
- McLean, F. H., and Waxweiler, E. (1906). Child labor in Belgium. Annals of the American Academy of Political and Social Science, vol. 28, pp. 105–113.
- Slosse, A., and Waxweiler, E. (1910). Enquête sur le régime alimentaire de 1065 ouvriers belges. Bruxelles: Misch et Thron.
- Waxweiler, E. (1895). Les hauts salaires aux Etats-Unis. Paris: Bibliothèque Gilon.
- Waxweiler, E. (1896a). Les lois protectrices du travail. Notes de Suisse. Bruxelles: Christophe Bruylant.
- Waxweiler, E. (1896b). La réglementation du travail du dimanche en Suisse. Rapport à M. le Ministre de l’Industrie et du Travail sur une mission d’études faite en août, 1895. Bruxelles: Lebègue.
- Waxweiler, E. (1897). L’organisation internationale de la statistique du travail. Congrès de la législation du travail, Bruxelles. [Cited in Sauveur (1924).]
- Waxweiler, E. (1898). La participation aux bénéfices: Contribution à l'étude des modes de rémunération du travail. Paris: Arthur Rousseau.
- Waxweiler, E. (1900). Du rôle d'une union internationale pour la protection légale des travailleurs. Paris. [Cited in Sauveur (1924).]
- Waxweiler, E. (1901). Die belgische Lohnstatistik und die Lohngestaltung der Kohlenarbeiter 1896–1900. Jahrbücher für Nationalökonomie und Statistik, Dritte Folge Bd. XXII (LXXVII), pp. 161–187.
- Waxweiler, E. (1905). Recherches statistiques sur l’alimentation ouvrière. Bulletin de l’Institut International de Statistique, tome XIV, pp. 206–213.
- Waxweiler, E. (1906a). Esquisse d’une sociologie. Bruxelles & Leipzig: Misch & Thron.
- Waxweiler, E. (1906b). Sur l’interprétation sociologique de la distribution des salaires. Remarque additionnelle to C. Henry (1906), Mesure des capacités intellectuelle et énergétique. Notes d’analyse statistique. Bruxelles & Leipzig: Misch & Thron.
- Waxweiler, E. (1909a). La statistique et les sciences de la vie. Bulletin de l’Institut International de Statistique, tome XVIII, pp. 211–219.
- Waxweiler, E. (1909b). L’enquête de l’Institut Solvay sur l'alimentation de la classe ouvrière en Belgique. Bulletin de l’Institut International de Statistique, tome XVIII, pp. 462–473.
- Waxweiler, E. (1912). Sur les conditions sociales de la formation et de la diffusion d’une doctrine scientifique dans ses rapports avec la religion et la magie. Bulletin de l’Institut Solvay, no. 21, pp. 916–936.
- Waxweiler, E. (1915). La Belgique neutre et loyale. Paris: Payot.
- Waxweiler, E. (1916). Le procès de la neutralité belge, réplique aux accusations. Paris: Payot.
- Waxweiler, E. (1974). Recueil de textes sociologiques d’Emile Waxweiler, 1906–1914. Introduction par F. Vanlangenhove. Bruxelles: Palais des Académies.

=== Other references ===
- Bie, P. de. (1974). La sociologie d’Emile Waxweiler. Bruxelles: Palais des Académies.
- Chamberlain, A. F. (1907). Instituts Solvay. Travaux de Sociologie. Notes et Mémoires. Misch et Thron, Éditeurs. Bruxelles et Leipzig, 1906. [Review of Fascicules 1–6 of Notes et Mémoires.] The American Journal of Psychology, vol. 18, no. 2, pp. 261–264.
- Frost, H. H. (1960). The functional sociology of Emile Waxweiler and the Institut de Sociologie Solvay. Bruxelles: Académie Royale de Belgique.
- Gide, C. (1899). [Review of: La Participation aux Bénéfices, by Emile Waxweiler.] The Economic Journal, vol. 9, no. 34, pp. 238–240.
- Small, A. W. (1906). [Review of: Esquisse d’une sociologie, by Emile Waxweiler.] The American Journal of Sociology, vol. 12, no. 3, pp. 424–426.
- Sarton, G. (1917). Emile Waxweiler (1867–1916). The Nation, vol. 104, no. 2693, pp. 168–169.
- Sauveur, M. (1924). Waxweiler, Emile. Bulletin de l’Institut International de Statistique, tome XXI, pp. 394–398.
- Schumpeter, J. (1907). [Review of: Esquisse d’une Sociologie, by E. Waxweiler.] The Economic Journal, vol. 17, no. 65, pp. 109–111.
- Vatin, F. (1996). [Review of: L’univers de la sociologie en Belgique de 1900 à 1940, by Jean-François Crombois.] Revue Française de Sociologie, vol. 37, no. 3, pp. 485–487.
- Willoughby, W. F. (1899). [Review of: La participation aux bénéfices: Contribution à l'étude des modes de rémunération du travail, by Emile Waxweiler.] Annals of the American Academy of Political and Social Science, vol. 13, pp. 120–121.

== See also ==
- Sociophysiology
- Solvay Institute of Sociology
- G. P. Zeliony
