= Charles A. Ellwood =

American sociologist (1873–1946)

Charles Abram Ellwood (January 20, 1873 near Ogdensburg, New York – September 25, 1946) was an American sociologist who was professor of sociology at University of Missouri-Columbia and Duke University. He has been described as one of the leading American sociologists of the interwar period, studying intolerance, communication and revolutions and using many multidisciplinary methods.

He argued that sociology should play a role in directing cultural evolution through education of society. He pioneered social psychology research in sociology.

== Early life ==
Ellwood was born to Gibson and Maria Walrath Ellwood on January 20, 1873, on the family farm close to Black Lake, New York. He studied at Cornell University from 1892 to 1896.

== Academic career ==
After graduating from Cornell in 1896, he joined University of Chicago where graduated with a PhD in sociology and philosophy in 1899. His dissertation, "Some Prolegomena to Social Psychology", was published in the American Journal of Sociology. He studied at University of Berlin from 1897 to 1898.

For one year he was lecturer and instructor at the University of Nebraska and in 1900 became professor of sociology at the University of Missouri. He became also advisory editor of the American Journal of Sociology and associate editor of the Journal of Criminal Law and Criminology. In 1904 he served as president of the Missouri Confederated Charities. He was the fourteenth president of the American Sociological Association in 1924. He spent the first 30 years of his career and rose to national prominence at the University of Missouri-Columbia. From 1930 to 1946, Ellwood chaired the sociology department at Duke University. He authored the 1940 book, The World's Need of Christ, which argues that the teachings of Jesus has solutions to the major ills of humanity.

He became professor emeritus in 1944.

Ellwood was influenced by Lester F. Ward, Charles Horton Cooley, John Dewey, and Edward A. Ross.

An excerpt from the Missouri University (MU) Sociology Web site reads:

Charles Ellwood was from the era in which sociology was emerging as a particular field of study distinguished from philosophy, political economy, religion, and other fields. Ellwood defended a scientific conception of sociology, but he also argued that sociology should address social problems and contribute directly to social reform. His moral and religious convictions fed directly into his sociology. Later, some advocates of a more scientific sociology would classify scholars like Ellwood as "do-gooders" who held sociology back from its scientific ambitions. Ellwood wrote an influential textbook on Social Problems which sold over 200,000 copies and established the model for social problems courses around the country. Thesis and dissertation topics at MU in Ellwood's period were largely focused on social problems including poverty and racial inequality in Columbia and other Missouri towns. One of his students, Terence Pihlblad, earned both his M.A. and Ph.D. at Missouri and subsequently joined the MU department as a professor, serving in that capacity, with minor interruptions, into the 1970s. Pihlblad's dissertation, completed in 1925 under Ellwood's direction, criticized the then-popular notion that intelligence tests might be used to determine which racial and ethnic groups were superior. Pihlblad argued that intelligence test scores reflect educational and social backgrounds rather than native intelligence. A tragic event in the 1920s (recounted by retired business executive, Bob Beasley, at the Centennial Symposium held by the Department of Sociology in September 2000) illustrates the kind of public controversy that has often affected MU sociology since the 1920s. In 1923 a young Black man was lynched in Columbia after being falsely accused of a sexual assault against a young white woman. He was hanged from a bridge over the main road running by the MU campus. In the aftermath of the event, according to Beasley's report, Charles Ellwood was a vocal, public critic of the lynching and of the local citizens for allowing such a thing to happen in Columbia. Ellwood became the target of Ku Klux Klan threats and much local indignation. In the same time period, Terry Pihlblad must have been writing his critique of the use of intelligence tests to determine racial and ethnic superiority. Also, Herbert Blumer, later to become a prominent sociologist at the University of Chicago and the University of California at Berkeley, completed an M.A. degree at MU in 1925 and stayed for a few years as a teacher. He became a target of public criticism around 1927 for suggesting in a guest lecture at Stephens College that there are no pure races, a point which Ellwood and Pihlblad had both argued in their writings.

== Personal life ==
He was married to Ida Breckinridge. They had one son, Walter B. Ellwood.

He died in his Durham, North Carolina home on September 25, 1946.

== Publications ==
- Sociology and Modern Social Problems (1910)
- Sociology in its Psychological Aspects (1912; French trans., 1914)
- The Social Problem: A Constructive Analysis (1915)
- An Introduction to Social Psychology. 1917.
- The Reconstruction of Religion. 1922.
- Methods in Sociology. Duke University Press, 1933.

He also monographs and special articles on social psychology.
