= Ernest Solvay =

Belgian chemist, industrialist, philanthropist (1838–1922)

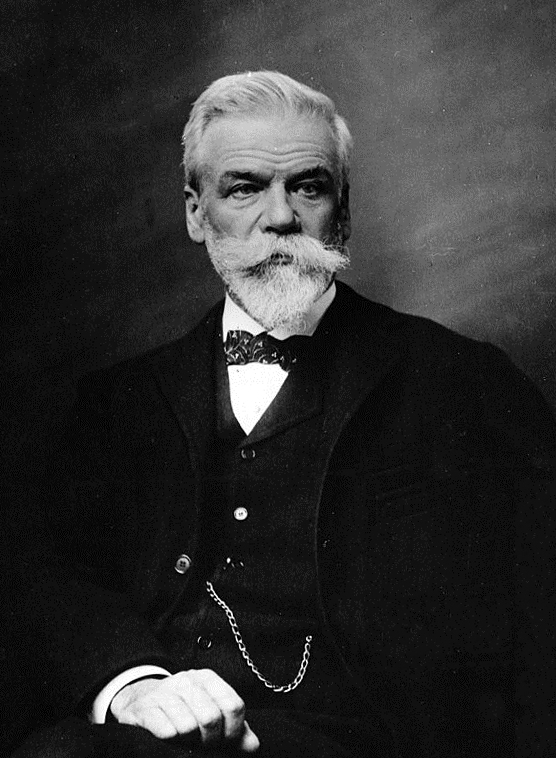
- Ernest Solvay (c. 1900)
- Born: 16 April 1838; Rebecq, Belgium
- Died: 26 May 1922 (aged 84); Ixelles, Brussels, Belgium
- Known for: ammonia-soda process
- Scientific career
- Fields: chemistry

Ernest Gaston Joseph Solvay (French: [sɔlvɛ]; 16 April 1838 – 26 May 1922) was a Belgian chemist, industrialist and philanthropist.

== Biography ==
Born in Rebecq, he was prevented by his acute pleurisy from going to university. He worked in his uncle's chemical factory from the age of 21.

In 1861, he, along with his brother Alfred Solvay, developed the ammonia-soda process (also known as the Solvay process) for the manufacturing of soda ash (anhydrous sodium carbonate) from brine (as a source of sodium chloride) and limestone (as a source of calcium carbonate). The process was an improvement over the earlier Leblanc process. Through his friendship with François Hoebeke, founder and owner of the bottling company Top Bronnen of Nederbrakel, later became the first company to develop and produce carbonated non-alcoholic drinks in Belgium.

He founded the company Solvay & Cie and established his first factory at Couillet (now merged into Charleroi, Belgium) in 1863, and further perfected the process until 1872, when he patented it. Soon, Solvay process plants were established in the United Kingdom, the United States, Ukraine, Russia, Germany and Austria. Today, about 70 Solvay process plants are still operational worldwide.

His patents brought Solvay considerable wealth, which he used for philanthropic purposes, including the establishment in 1894 of the "Institut des Sciences Sociales" (ISS) or Institute for Sociology at the Free University of Brussels (now split into the Université libre de Bruxelles and the Vrije Universiteit Brussel), as well as International Institutes for Physics and Chemistry. In 1903, he founded the Solvay Business School which is also part of the Free University of Brussels. In 1911, he began a series of important conferences in physics, known as the Solvay Conferences, whose participants included Max Planck, Ernest Rutherford, Maria Skłodowska-Curie, Henri Poincaré, and (then only 32 years old) Albert Einstein. A later conference would include Niels Bohr, Werner Heisenberg, Max Born, and Erwin Schrödinger.

He was twice elected to the Belgian Senate for the Liberal Party and granted honorary title of Minister of State at the end of his life. Solvay, New York and Rosignano Solvay, the locations of the first Solvay process plants in the United States and in Italy, are also named after him.

Solvay died in Ixelles at the age of 84 and is buried in Ixelles Cemetery.

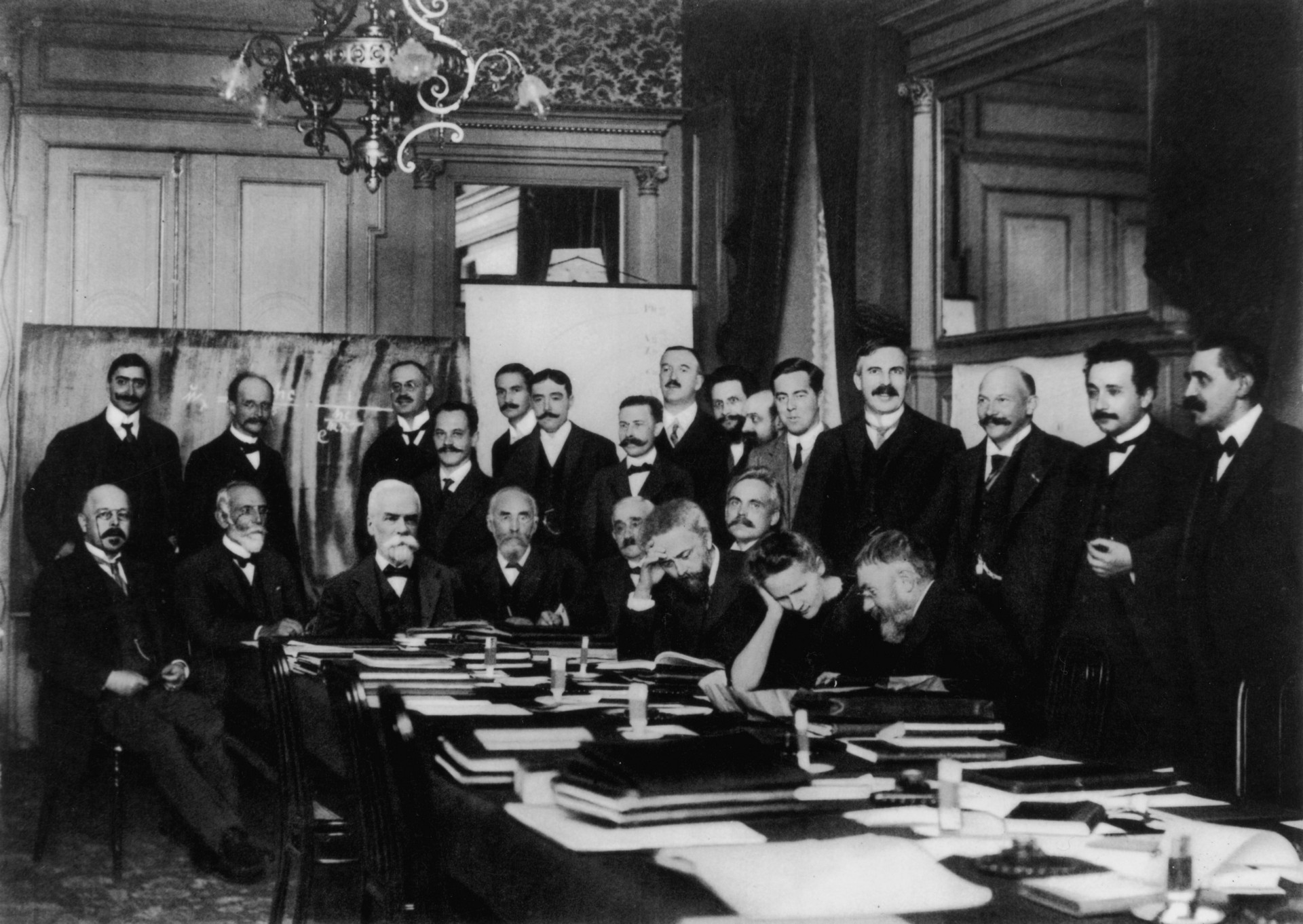
The portrait of participants to the first Solvay Conference in 1911. Ernest Solvay is the third seated from the left. Solvay was not present at the time the photo was taken, so his photo was cut and pasted onto this one for the official release

== Honours ==
- 1918 : Minister of State, By Royal Decree.
- Grand Cordon in the Order of Leopold, by Royal Decree. 21 November 1918
- Grand Cordon in the Legion of Honour France, 7 November 1919

== See also ==
- Solvay Institute of Sociology
- Emile Waxweiler
- Solvay Hut

== Literature ==
- Bertrand, Louis, Ernest Solvay. Een hervormer op maatschappelijk gebied, Brussels, Agence Dechenne, 1918, 113 p.
- Boianovsky, Mauro, Erreygers, Guido, Social comptabilism and pure credit systems. Solvay and Wicksell on monetary reform, in : Fontaine, Philippe, Leonard, Robert, (ed.), The experiment in the history of economics, London, Routledge, 2005, pp. 98–134.
- Despy-Meyer, Andrée, Devriese Didier (ed.), Ernest Solvay et son temps, Brussels, Archives de l'ULB, 1997, 349 p.
- Erreygers, Guido, The economic theories and social reform proposals of Ernest Solvay (1838–1922), in : Samuels, Warren J. (red.), European economists of the early 20th century, volume 1. Studies of neglected thinkers of Belgium, France, The Netherlands and Scandinavia, Cheltenham-Northampton, Edward Elgar, 1998, pp. 221–262.
- Rapaille, Maxime, Solvay, un géant. Des rives de la Sambre aux confins de la terre, Bruxelles, Didier Hatier, 1989, 187 p.
- Author not stated. "Vie D'Ernest Solvay" Bruxelles, Chez le Libraire Lamertin, 1929, 164 pp. Ten heliogravures (two in color) Soft cover. Notation at front reads "Les principaux travaux d'Ernest Solvay, sur des questions scientifiques, politiques et sociales, paraitront en deux volumes, de meme format que celui-ci, chez Lamertin, fin 1929, sous le titre : Notes, Lettres et Discours d'Ernest Solvay."
