= Dominique Leroy =

Belgian businesswoman (born 1964)

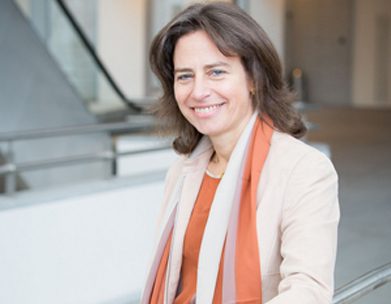
Dominique Leroy

Dominique Leroy (born 8 November 1964, Ixelles) is a Belgian businesswoman who has been serving as member of the Board of Deutsche Telekom with responsibility for the Europe segment since 2020. Prior to her assignment at Deutsche Telekom she was the CEO of telecommunications company Proximus Group from January 2014 until September 2019 and an adviser at Bain & Company.

== Education ==
Leroy holds a Master in Industrial Engineering and Management from Solvay Business School.

== Career ==
Leroy was at Unilever as Managing Director for Belgium and Luxembourg from September 2007 until October 2011. She was the national customer development director of Unilever Belgium from February 2006 until August 2007.

She was Head of the Consumer Market at Proximus from October 2011, and later was executive vice president of the consumer business unit and was a member of the management committee of Belgacom. The ministers of the Belgian Cabinet appointed Leroy as successor to Didier Bellens on 9 January 2014. She became the first woman to head the company and, at the time, the only female CEO among companies in Belgium’s BEL 20 stock market index.

By late 2018, the Financial Times reported that Leroy was one of the candidates for succeeding Gavin Patterson as CEO of the BT Group; the job instead went to Philip Jansen. In early 2019, she was summoned to meet Belgian Prime Minister Charles Michel after media reported a cost-cutting plan at Proximus that would involve a net headcount reduction of 650 jobs.

Thursday September 5, 2019 she announced her resignation as CEO of Proximus effective December 1, 2019 to become CEO of Dutch telecom provider KPN. On September 30, 2019 KPN announced that Leroy was no longer a candidate for the position of CEO, since she was under investigation by the Belgian Financial Services and Markets Authority for insider trading.

During 2020 she was an Advisor to Bain & Company.

== Other activities ==
=== Corporate boards ===
- T-Mobile US, Member of the Board of Directors (since 2022)
- Hellenic Telecommunications Organisation S.A. (OTE Group), Member of the Board of Directors (since 2022)
- T-Mobile Polska, Chairwoman of the Board of Directors (since 2022)
- GSMA, Member of the Board and of the Audit Committee (since 2022)
- Apheon, Member of Apheon Capital Advisory Committee (since 2020)
- Saint-Gobain, Independent Director, Member of the Nomination and Remuneration Committee (since 2017)
- Ahold Delhaize, Member of the Board of Directors (2016-2021)
- Belgacom ICS, Chairwoman of the Board of Directors (since 2016-2019)
- Lotus Bakeries, Member of the Board of Directors (2009-2018)
- Bain & Company, Independent Senior Advisor (2019-2020)
- BICS, Chairwoman of the Board (2014-2019)
- Delhaize Group, Independent Member of the Board of Directors (2015-2016)
- Telindus Luxemburg, Member of the Board of Directors (2015-2016)
- Tango Luxemburg, Chairwoman of the Board of Directors (2014-2016)

=== Non-profit organizations ===
- European Round Table of Industrialists (ERT), Member
- Solvay Brussels School of Economics and Management, Chairwoman of the Advisory Board (2015-2019)
- World Economic Forum, Member of the International Business Council
- ETNO, Member
- YPO Group, Member
