= Tyntec =

tyntec
- Type: Private
- Industry: Telecommunications
- Founded: 2002; 24 years ago
- Defunct: July 31, 2026
- Fate: Bankrupted
- Headquarters: London, The United Kingdom
- Area served: Worldwide
- Key people: Nicola Wolfram (CEO), Thorsten Trapp (Cofounder, CTO)
- Products: Messaging; Voice; Phone Numbers; Number Information Services; Operator Services
- Number of employees: 100+
- Website: www.tyntec.com

Tyntec (or tyntec, as spelled by the company) was a global application-to-person messaging operator, cloud communications provider, and a US Inter-Carrier Vendor incorporated in London, UK.

== History ==
Tyntec was founded by entrepreneurs Dr. Ralph Eric Kunz and Thorsten Trapp in 2002. In 2017, it regrouped its regional operations, Tyntec Limited in the UK, Tyntec GmbH in Germany, Tyntec Inc. in the US, and Tyntec Pte Ltd in Singapore, under a new holding company, the Tyntec Group Limited, based in London.

On 19th June 2026 the Limited was placed into insolvency; on 10th July 2026 the GmbH followed. On 31th July 2026 Tyntec stopped all operations.

== Funding ==
In June 2008, tyntec founders sold a minority share of the company to HarbourVest, an independent global alternative investment firm. In December 2010, tyntec received investment from Iris Capital, a pan-European growth fund specializing in technology, media and telecommunications. In 2016, the management of tyntec acquired the company from HarbourVest Partners and Iris Capital, backed by Cipio Partners, a Germany-based private equity firm.

== Technology ==
tyntec built and developed a scalable proprietary patent-protected technology infrastructure that was installed at the operator level, which gave it direct operator-level connectivity to the GSM network.

The signal routing and delivery platform, housed in the technical operations center in Dortmund, was the core of tyntec's messaging platform. It was designed to be scalable and to handle high volumes of traffic without service degradation. It also provided several interfaces, which were available across all networks.

tyntec's direct access into the global mobile network through its agreements with operators meant that the company could directly reach the subscribers' handset. This was particularly important in crisis situations, when networks are often overloaded or go down.

== Awards ==
In 2010, tyntec was awarded the Red Herring 100 Europe Award. In 2011 it was awarded the Red Herring Global 100 Award for its tt.One solution. In the same year it also won the Internet Telephony Product of the Year Award.

== Competitors ==
Competitors were Sinch, Soprano Design, Twilio, Infobip, Vonage (Nexmo), Clickatell, and BICS (TeleSign).
