= Louvain School of Management =

Business school of UCLouvain, founded in 1897

- Former names: École des sciences commerciales et consulaires (1897–1972); Institut d'administration et de gestion (1972–2005)
- Motto: Excellence and Ethics in Management
- Type: Public university faculty
- Established: 1897 (129 years ago)
- Parent institution: UCLouvain
- Affiliations: EQUIS, CEMS, PIM
- Dean: Prof. Per J. Agrell
- Vice Deans: Profs. Philippe Grégoire (LLN), François Fouss (Mons), Ingrid Poncin, Ina Aust-Gronarz
- Academic staff: 175
- Administrative staff: 40
- Students: 1346 (2018, graduate)
- Undergraduates: 347 (2018)
- Postgraduates: 513 (2018)
- Doctoral students: 60 (2018)
- Other students: 250
- Location: Louvain-la-Neuve, Mons, Charleroi, Belgium; 50.66831°N 4.61244°E
- Colours: Louvain blue and LSM gold
- Website: lsm.be

The Louvain School of Management (LSM; formerly IAG) is the international business school of the University of Louvain (UCLouvain), Belgium, founded in 1897. The faculty offers courses on the campuses of Louvain-la-Neuve, UCLouvain FUCaM Mons and UCLouvain Charleroi.

The school is accredited by the European Quality Improvement System (EQUIS) and is the Belgian member of the Community of European Management Schools (CEMS).

LSM offers Bachelor's and Master's degrees (Master in Management Science and Master in Business Engineering), PhD programs and conducts research in Economics and Management Sciences and Executive Education Programs, including an Executive Master Program in Business Administration.

The core faculty comprises 55 professors (all of them having a PhD degree), and around 150 visiting faculty members from corporate world or other universities. The school is also affiliated with two research and development institutes, the Louvain Research Institute in Management and Organizations and Louvain Institute for Data Analysis and Modelling with over 100 active PhD and Post-Doctoral researchers.

== History ==
The Louvain School of Management was founded in 1897 under the name "école des sciences commerciales et consulaires" as a department of UCLouvain. In 1972 it became the "Institut d'Administration et de Gestion" (lAG), under the Faculty of Economic, Social and Political Sciences and Communication.

In 1989 the School started to offer a systematic exchange program. It is a member since 1989 of the CEMS network and since 1990 of the PIM network. It is also affiliated through the University to a large number of international corporate, research and education networks such as CLUSTER or COIMBRA.

In 2005 it became an autonomous part of UCLouvain and started to brand itself internationally as the Louvain School of Management. In 2006 it launched its International executive MBA. It became an independent faculty in 2010.

In 2011, LSM merged with the department of management of the Facultés universitaires catholiques de Mons (now UCLouvain FUCaM Mons). So far, LSM is operating on three campuses: Louvain-la-Neuve, Mons and Charleroi. Negotiations for a full merger with two other universities, the Facultés universitaires Notre-Dame de la Paix (FUNDP) located in Namur and the Facultés universitaires Saint-Louis (FUSL) located in Brussels, were halted in 2012, however the latter (UCLouvain Saint-Louis - Bruxelles) has de facto integrated UCLouvain in 2018, fully merged by September 2023.

== Academic programs ==
The Louvain School of Management offers the following main graduate programs in French or English:

- Master in Management Science (120 ECTS, 2 years)
- Master in Business engineering (120 ECTS, 2 years)
- Master in Management (1 year) (60-75 ECTS, Master-after-Master or "Junior" MBA)
- PhD in Economics and Management Sciences (180 ECTS, 3 years)

The Master in Business Engineering and the Master in Management Science include the following specialised tracks:

- Master in International Management (CEMS MIM programme)
- Master with one full year abroad (“International Business”)
- Master with one year spent in a partner institution (Double Degree)
- Master with a specialisation in entrepreneurship (“CPME”)

A one-year, 75 ECTS version of the Master in Business Engineering and Master in Management is also offered for foreign students with already a four- or five-year degree in management.

In addition, the school proposes elective modules in different fields: finance, marketing, European business, e-commerce, human resources, tax policy, accounting and control, supply chain management, logistics and transport, digital marketing, innovation management, technological project, business data analytics, ...

Executive Masters such as the International Executive MBA (IEMBA) are also offered.

== Accreditation ==
Louvain School of Management holds the international accreditation EQUIS since 2006, unconditional five-year since 2019. LSM as part of UCLouvain is a higher education institute, recognized and subsidized by decree, accredited by the Belgian agency AEQES.

== Rankings ==
LSM the only Belgian school to offer the CEMS Master in International Management Program (MIM) ranked n°8 worldwide by the Financial Times in 2019 (1st position in Belgium among Masters in Management). The School is ranked #1 in Belgium by Eduniversal as the only Belgian management school with the highest rank (five palmes). In addition, the Master in Business Engineering at LSM is annually ranked in the Financial Times (70th position worldwide, three-year average 2018-2019-2020).

== Research ==
The research activities in the management faculty are carried out mainly in three research institutes of UCLouvain.

The Louvain Research Institute in Management and Organizations is organized in four research groups:

- The Centre for Research in Entrepreneurial Change and Innovative Strategies (CRECIS)
- Lab4Hum
- The Centre on Consumers Relations and Responsible Marketing (CERMA)
- The Center in Management Information Systems (CEMIS)

The Louvain Institute for Data Analysis and Modelling is producing management research within

- Center for Operations Research and Econometrics (CORE)
- Louvain Finance (LFIN)

The Institute for the Analysis of Change in Contemporary and Historical Societies is a larger institute with faculty from the Louvain School of Management primarily active in

- Centre de recherches interdisciplinaires, Démocratie, Institutions, Subjectivité (CRIDIS)

== International relations ==
LSM has a large network of academic partners in the world, it is notably part of the CEMS, Partnership in International Management (PIM) and the 'Consortium Linking Universities of Science and Technology for Education and Research' (CLUSTER) networks.

LSM also has established double degrees agreement universities abroad, including: The University of Cologne, Aalto University School of Economics, EGADE, Norwegian School of Economics, Nova School of Business and Economics, Instituto Superior Técnico, University of Economics, Prague, Aix-Marseille University and the Fundação Getúlio Vargas. Other agreements, aimed at reducing the length of the studies for an MBA program at these universities for LSM graduates, have been signed with the University of Chicago Booth School of Business and the Samuel Curtis Johnson Graduate School of Management at Cornell University.

LSM also offers an International Business track allowing a full year abroad by combining a one-semester academic exchange with a 6-months internship in a foreign company. Most LSM's Master students undertake at least one term abroad as part of their studies in one of the 150 different universities who have agreement with the school. As well, most of the students do an internship of 3 to 6 months.

== Alumni ==
The Louvain School of Management's alumni are grouped in the Alumni LSM association. Amongst the 20 biggest Belgian companies quoted in the BEL20 index, 7 have their CEO and/or at least one member of the board who are alumni of the Louvain School of Management.

Famous alumni are:

- John J. Goossens (1944-2002), former CEO of Belgacom (now Proximus Group)
- Pierre-Olivier Beckers, former CEO of Delhaize/Food Lion
- Frank Beuselinck, former CEO of DHL Belgium
- Michel Georgis, former CEO of Proximus, former Executive Vice-President Consumer Business Unit of Belgacom
- Jean Hilgers, chairman of the board of the National Bank of Belgium
- Georges Jacobs, former chairman of the board of UCB (company) and of Delhaize Group
- Jean-Claude Logé, former CEO of Systemat
- Claude Meyer, former CEO of Procter & Gamble Europe
- Aloïs Michielsen, former chairman of the board Solvay
- Charles Picqué, politician, former Minister-President of the Brussels Region
- Jean Stéphenne, former CEO of GlaxoSmithKline Biologicals
- Michel Tilmant, former CEO of ING
- Philippe Vander Putten, former CEO of Brussels Airlines

== See also ==
- Université catholique de Louvain
