= Aled Miles =

British-American internet security expert (born 1965)

- Born: Aled Euros Miles; 23 May 1965 (age 61); Wales, UK
- Education: Stanford University; St. Mary's University
- Occupations: President and CEO, Formstack
- Employer: Intellistack
- Organization: Welsh Government Envoy
- Board member of: Royal Welsh College of Music and Drama; Whispir; Sapien; Wildstar.tv; Stay Safe Online

Aled Euros Miles OBE (born 23 May 1965) is a British-American information technology executive and internet security expert currently based in Los Angeles, California.

Miles is the President and CEO of Intellistack, the Welsh Government Envoy to the United States (appointed in September 2020), and serves on the Board of Lixa. Previously he was the CEO of Sauce Labs, and the CEO and member of the board of global tech firm, TeleSign Corporation.

He is a graduate of St. Mary's University and the Stanford Graduate School of Business, and previously was on the executive committee as a senior vice-president at the global security firm, Symantec.

== Career ==
Miles began his business technology career at the security firm Symantec. He worked in various roles over his twenty-year tenure, eventually reaching the position of senior vice-president, where he oversaw the global Norton division.

In 2006, Miles relocated to the United States to become president and COO of Los Angeles-based Helinet Aviation Services, a helicopter services provider. During this time, he also became the CEO of Cineflex Camera Systems, which developed gyro-stabilized camera systems used in aerial broadcast production. During his tenure, Cineflex was awarded Emmy recognition for its role in the filming of the BBC's documentary series, Planet Earth. In 2007 Cineflex was acquired by Nasdaq-listed company Axsys Technologies (AXYS). In 2009, Axsys was acquired by General Dynamics and Miles returned to Symantec.

In 2015, leaving Symantec's executive committee, Miles was executive vice-president and general manager for the identity and access management software company ForgeRock. In 2017, Miles became CEO of TeleSign, a Communications Platform as a Service company mainly involved in two-factor authentication services, based in Marina del Rey, California. In 2017, Miles oversaw the $230 million acquisition of TeleSign by the Belgian communications company Belgacom ICS. BICS is a joint venture between Proximus, SwissCom & MTN.

In October 2019, Miles was appointed CEO of Sauce Labs, based in San Francisco, California, replacing former CEO, Charles Ramsey.

As of December 2023, Miles is the CEO of Intellistack (formerly Formstack).

== Boards ==
Miles is and has been on several boards in both the business and non-profit sectors. He currently serves on the Board of Lixa. Previously, Miles was the executive chairman of Industrial IoT company IoTium and was a non-executive director of the Australian cyber security company Sapien alongside The Hon. Stephen Smith and Lieutenant General (ret.) James Clapper, former Director of National Intelligence under U.S. President Barack Obama. He served on the board of the NCSA from 2017 to 2018.

Due to his work on Planet Earth through Cineflex, he was founding board member of Wildstar.tv led by the award-winning producers and directors, Vanessa Berlowitz and Mark Linfield.

He was a founding advisory board member of Surf Air, a California-based unlimited flight commuter airline, and was a member of the CGI Leadership, Education and Development program administered by the Clinton Global Initiative.

In September 2020, he was appointed as the Welsh Government Envoy to the United States, acting as a trade ambassador and representative to enhance and grow the diplomatic & trade relationship between Wales and the U.S.

In 2024, Miles was in his sixth and final year as a director/board member of The National Conservatoire of Wales under the presidency of H.R.H. King Charles III.

He currently sits on the board of Royal Welsh College of Music and Drama.

Miles has been a long-time patron of Rainbow Trust Children's Charity, where he has been on the board of trustees.

Miles is also an Innovator In Residence at USC Viterbi.
