= Ryan Disraeli =

American businessman

- Born: Ryan Disraeli; San Diego, California, US
- Education: University of Southern California (BS)
- Occupations: CEO, Inspectiv
- Known for: Co-founder of TeleSign

Ryan Disraeli is an American businessman, and a co-founder and the CEO of TeleSign. In 2022, Disraeli was named CEO of cybersecurity company, Inspectiv.

== Early life and education ==
Raised in San Diego, California, Disraeli attended the University of Southern California (USC), where he studied business at USC Marshall School of Business. In 2018, Disraeli was awarded the USC Marshall School of Business Alumni Entrepreneur of the year award.

== Career ==
In 2005, while he was a sophomore at USC, Disraeli cofounded an online security service company, TeleSign. Disraeli worked as vice president of the company for fraud services and helped expand TeleSign's communications platform-as-a-service (CPaaS) to any developer capable of invoking a REST Application Programming Interface (API). Disraeli helped TeleSign raise $78 Million dollars in funding and grew annual revenues to more than $100 Million with hundreds of employees across the globe.

Disraeli regularly provides commentary in the area of behavioral biometrics and Multi-factor authentication. He also regularly comments on online security and fraud-related issues. In 2017, Disraeli was named to Forbes 30 under 30 for enterprise technology. In the same year, TeleSign was acquired for 230 million dollars by Belgacom ICS.

In June 2022, Disraeli was named CEO of Inspectiv, a cybersecurity startup company.
