= Deneve =

Deneve is a surname of French origin, being a variant of the surname Denefe, which originated as a habitational surname for someone from places called Neffe in Belgium. Notable people with the surname include:

- Paul Deneve (born 1961), Belgian businessman
- Rita Deneve (1944–2018), Belgian singer
- Stéphane Denève (born 1971), French conductor
