= Orlan =

French contemporary artist

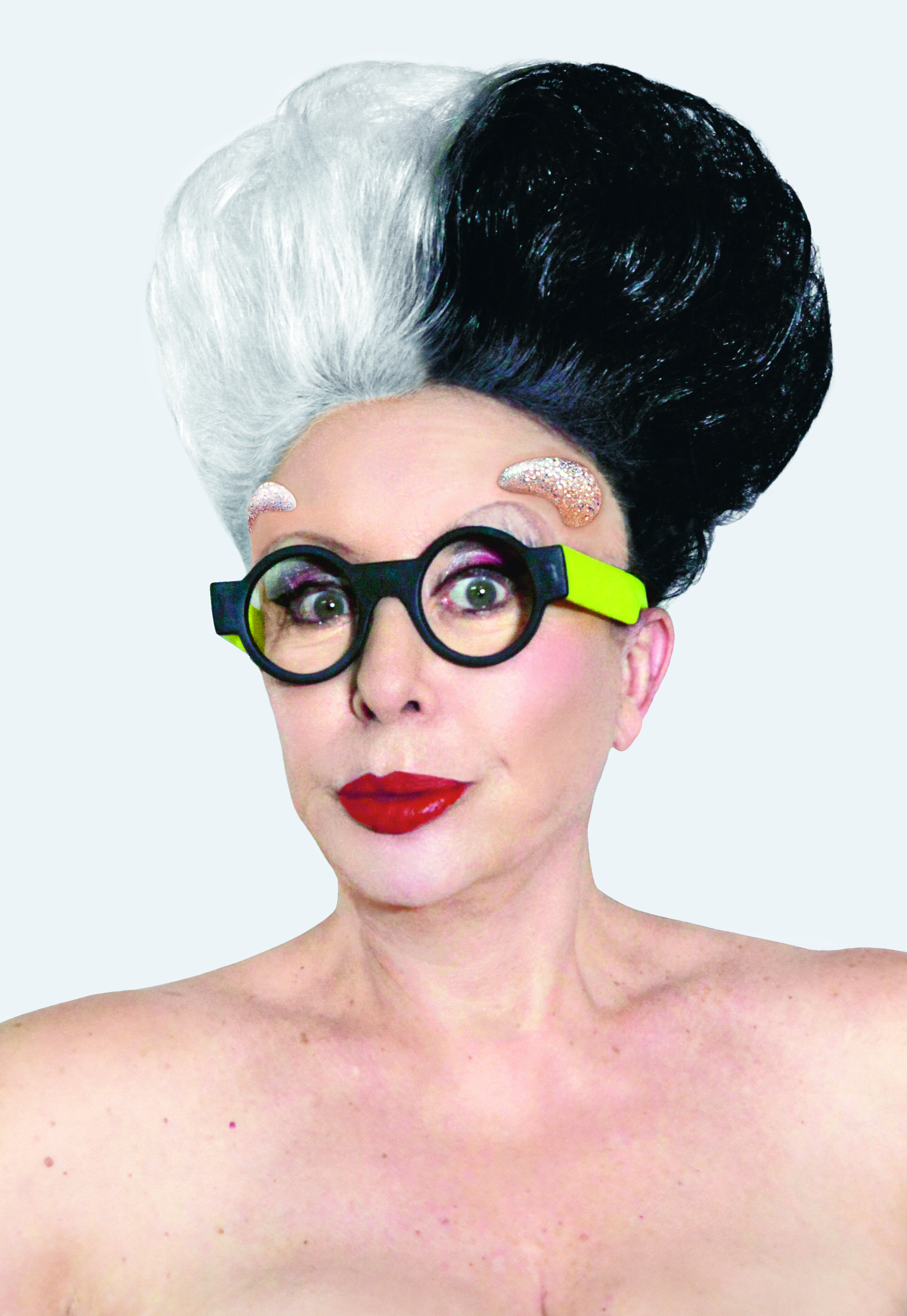
- Orlan in 2021
- Born: Saint-Étienne, France
- Website: www.orlan.eu

Orlan (stylized as ORLAN) is a French multi-media artist who uses sculpture, photography, performance, video, video games, augmented reality, artificial intelligence, and robotics as well as scientific and medical techniques such as surgery and biotechnology to question modern social phenomena. She has said that her art is not body art, but 'carnal art,' which lacks the suffering aspect of body art.

== Biography ==
Since the 1960s and 70s, Orlan has challenged how the body is shaped by political, religious, and social norms, often through feminist art. Her work uses her own body to explore identity, frequently through photography.

In 1976, she wore a dress printed with her nude image. Around the same time in Portugal, she displayed cut-out photos of her body parts, like an arm or breast.

In 1977, she performed Kiss of the Artist at FIAC in the Grand Palais, Paris. She sat behind a life-sized photo of her nude torso, turned into a slot machine that gave kisses for coins. The piece caused controversy and cost her a teaching job.

In 1978, she founded the International Symposium of Performance in Lyon, running it until 1982. Her 1990–1993 "carnal art" series involved live surgical performances, sparking debate though they were a small part of her work.

In 1982, she and Frédéric Develay launched Art-Accès-Revue, the first online art magazine on Minitel.

In the late 1990s and early 2000s, her Self-Hybridations series digitally merged her face with those from various cultures.

Later, she used biotechnology in Harlequin Coat, made from her own and others' cells.

She taught at the École nationale supérieure d'arts de Paris-Cergy, had residencies at ISCP (2005) and the Getty Research Institute (2006).

In 2013, she sued Lady Gaga for plagiarism linked to Born This Way, but lost both the initial case and appeal, being ordered to pay legal costs.

That year, she won the Grand Prix de la Réputation for internet visibility, alongside Philippe Starck and Yann Arthus-Bertrand.

During COVID-19 lockdowns, she wrote her autobiography, Strip-Tease : tout sur ma vie, tout sur mon art, published by Gallimard.

On November 29, 2021, she was named a Knight of the Legion of Honor by Minister Roselyne Bachelot.

=== The Reincarnation of Sainte-ORLAN ===
In 1990, Orlan began The Reincarnation of Sainte-ORLAN. It involved a series of plastic surgeries through which the artist transformed herself into elements from famous paintings and sculptures of women. As a part of her "Carnal Art" manifesto, these works were filmed and broadcast in institutions throughout the world, such as the Centre Georges Pompidou in Paris and the Sandra Gehring Gallery in New York.

Orlan picked these characters, "not for the canons of beauty they represent... but rather on account of the stories associated with them." Orlan defines cosmetic surgery as "nomadic, mutant, shifting, differing." She has stated, "my work is a struggle against the innate, the inexorable, the programmed, Nature, DNA (which is our direct rival as far as artists of representation are concerned), and God!".

Being showcased in the Paris International Contemporary Art Fair.

== In the 2000s ==
In 2001, Orlan orchestrated a series of filmic posters, "Le Plan du Film," with various artists and writers. She collaborated in 2008 with the Symbiotica laboratory in Australia, resulting in the bio-art installation "The Harlequin's Coat."Part of ORLAN's ongoing work includes "Suture/Hybridize/Recycle," a generative and collaborative series of clothing made from Orlan's wardrobe and focusing on suture: the deconstruction of past clothing reconstructed into new clothing that highlights the sutures.

It receives the Reputation on line Prize (Grand Prix de le-réputation) in 2013, organized by the art critic Alexia Guggemos, Plastic Arts category, which rewards the most popular personalities on the Internet alongside Phillipe Starck for design and Yann Arthus-Bertrand for photography.

In 2018, Orlan created a robot in her own image, " Orlanoïde", equipped with collective and social artificial intelligence that speaks with her voice by reading texts from a text generator: presented at the Grand Palais, for the exhibition "Artists and Robots", the robot is also part of a performance entitled "Electronic and verbal striptease" and also benefits from a motion generator. It is a work in progress, currently, the developers of the Art and science gallery in Dublin are developing other capacities.

In 2019, she was honored with the special prize of WOMAN OF THE YEAR, awarded by the Prince of Monte Carlo. Orlan is also appointed Professor Emeritus of the Accademia di Belle Arti di Roma.

She is represented in France by the Ceysson & Bénétière Gallery. In September and October 2024, her work titled Corps-sculpture sans visage en mouvement dansant avec son ombre n°6 (1967) was included in Ceysson & Bénétière Gallery's group exhibition, Clairvoyant.

== See more ==
- Smith, K. (2007). Abject Bodies Beckett, Orlan, Stelarc and the politics of contemporary performance. Performance Research, 12(1), 66–76.
- Zerihan, R. (2012). ORLAN: A Hybrid Body of Artworks. Contemporary Theatre Review, 22(3), 426–428.
- Ayers, R. (1999). Serene and Happy and Distant: An Interview with Orlan. Body & Society, 5(2/3), 171.
- Knafo, D. (2009). Castration and Medusa: ORLAN's Art on the Cutting Edge. Studies in Gender & Sexuality, 10(3), 142–158.
- Lovelace, C. (1995). ORLAN: Offensive Acts. Performing Arts Journal, 17(1), 13–25. doi:10.2307/3245692 Orlan: Offensive Acts
- Rose, B. (1993). Is it art? ORLAN and the transgressive act. Art in America, 81(2), 82.
- Sayej, N. (2020, March 26). ORLAN: "I walked a long way for women." The Guardian. ORLAN: 'I walked a long way for women'
