= Anthony Asael =

Belgian photographer

- Born: 19 November 1974 (age 50); Brussels, Belgium
- Education: Solvay Business School
- Occupation(s): Photographer, explorer
- Years active: 2000–present

Anthony Asael (born 1974) is an international photographer who works for the Getty agency (previously Corbis. He is of Turkish and Italian origin. He is also the founder of the not-for-profit organization Art in All of Us. Anthony Asael has traveled through, photographed and taught in all 193 UN member countries.

== Early life ==
At 7 years old, he developed his black-and-white photography in his lab. He traveled with and learned from Ruggero Gabbai – a professional Italian photographer and film director.

== Art in All of Us ==
Anthony graduated from Solvay Business School in Belgium. He held several management positions at various IT and telecommunication companies. In 2004 he decided to dedicate to the non-profit sector and founded Art in All of Us, an organisation that claims to promote tolerance and cultural exchanges in schools. Having traveled throughout the world and encountered with different cultures, Asael aims at giving a right of expression to children and building more tolerance through artistic exchanges and communication. He wants Art in All of Us to be the international platform of child art exchanges, promoting tolerance and creative cultural exchanges while using the universal language of Art.

The World Art Book of Art in All of Us (also called Art in All of Us, The World seen through the Eyes and Rhymes of the Children) was launched the 20 November 2009 at the United Nations in New York in the frame of the 20 years anniversary of the Children Rights Convention. It presents in one book each of the 193 UN member countries through a local child, with a single portrait and a drawing and a poem by the child. Anthony Asael was the main photographer in this expedition.

== Exhibitions ==
Asael's artwork and photography have been shown in over 80 exhibitions since 2000. His exhibitions "Colors and Scents", "The 8 Millennium Goals", "Children Rights", "Know your World" and the "Children World Art Tour" has toured through 5 continents. He was featured in 2006–2008 within exhibitions on the Millennium Goals in Brussels, Milan, Antwerp, Toronto, New York City and in Santiago for the 60th anniversary of the Unicef. The Children World Art Tour was launched in 2010 at Antwerpen-Centraal railway station and Tour & Taxis in Brussels.

In 2012, with Art in All of Us, his work was shown at the World Expo 2012 in Yeosu, South Korea and in Rio de Janeiro for the Rio+20 UN Conference on Sustainable Development.

== Awards and recognition ==
With Art in All of Us, he has provided photography classes to over 388,000 children in over 1650 schools through partnership with UNICEF or SOS Children Villages.

He and Art in All of Us has also been honored at the UNICEF for the 20 years anniversary of the Children Rights Convention and exhibited in the UNICEF headquarters for the event at the same time as launching their World Art Book .

In 2009, he also won the first Prize of the Smile Festival in Paris organized by the art critic Alexia Guggemos, founder of the Smile Museum, from the hands of Sabine Weiss, president of the jury.

== Bibliography ==
- September 2012 – Princess Laria and the Cow Coloring Book, Kitanie, 1st Edition, USA, ISBN 978-1935734482
- September 2011 – Children of the World, Rizzoli, 1st Edition, USA, ISBN 978-0-7893-2267-8
- November 2009 – Art in All of Us, The World seen through the Eyes and Rhymes of the Children, RE Producciones, 1st Edition, Chile, ISBN 978-2-8052-0037-3
- November 2009 – Si Tous les Enfants du Monde, Playbac Éditions, 1st Édition, France, ISBN 978-2809603057
