= Solvay Brussels School of Economics and Management =

Belgian business school

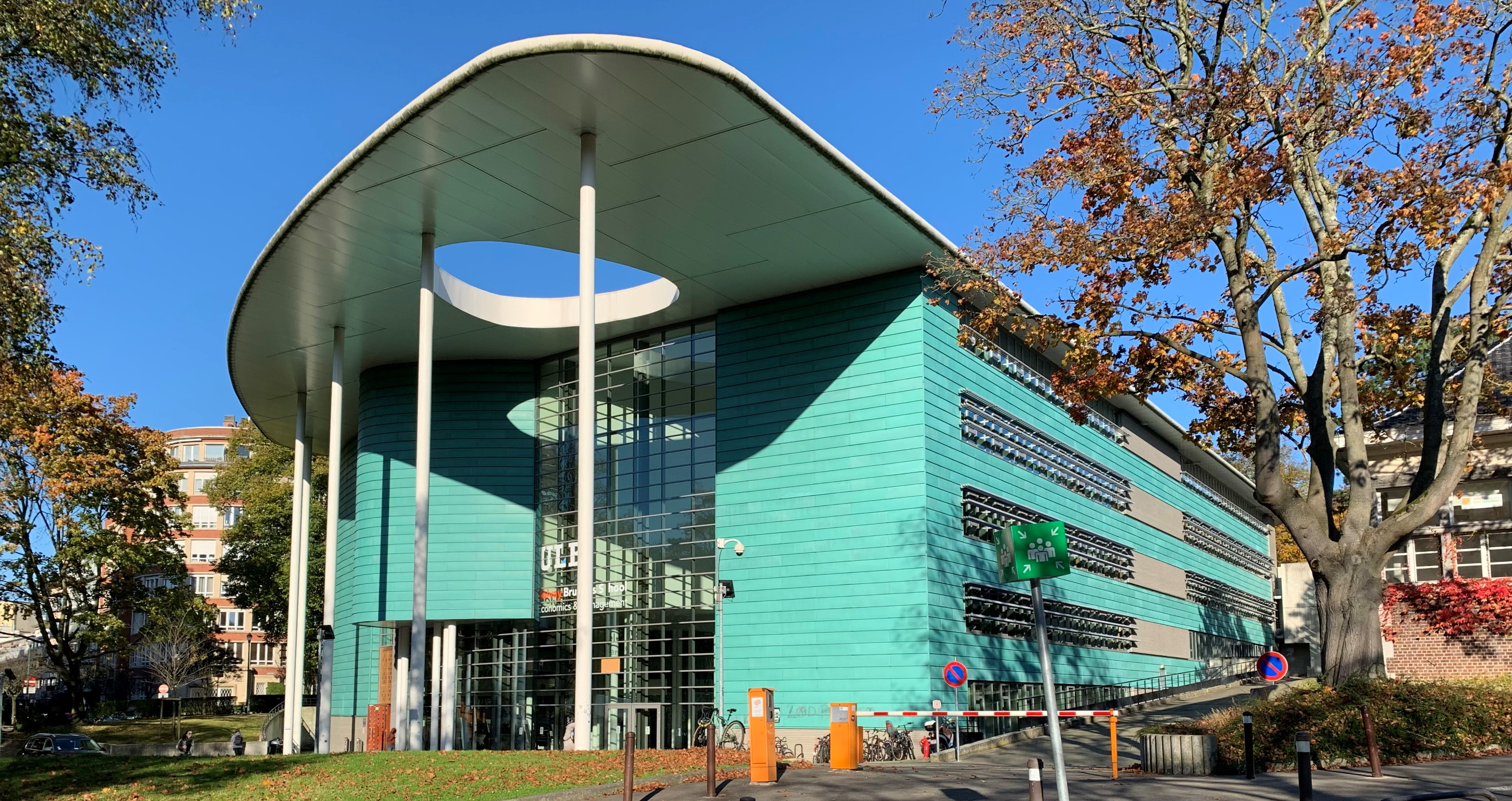
- Solvay Brussels School's main building
- Type: Faculty of the Université libre de Bruxelles
- Established: 1899: ULB Department of Economics; 1903: Solvay Business School; 2008: Merger to SBS-EM
- Affiliations: Université libre de Bruxelles, EQUIS, AMBA
- Dean: Catherine Dehon
- Academic staff: 630
- Students: 3,700
- Undergraduates: 1,950
- Location: Brussels, Belgium; 50°48′50″N 4°22′44″E
- Campus: Urban: Solbosch/Solbos, ULB
- Website: sbsem.ulb.be

The Solvay Brussels School of Economics and Management (abbreviated as SBS-EM and also known as simply Solvay) is a school of economics and management, and a Faculty of the Université libre de Bruxelles (ULB), a French-speaking private research university located in Brussels, Belgium. Business education started in 1899, and Solvay was established in 1903 through a donation from the industrialist Ernest Solvay.

== Overview ==
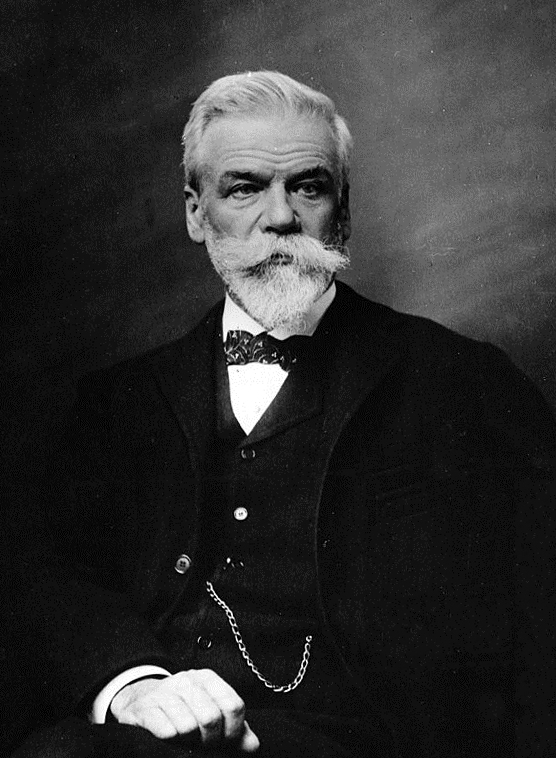
Ernest Solvay, the school's founder and namesake

The roots of the Solvay School stretch back to the founding of the Department of Economics of the Free University of Brussels in 1899, and the founding of the Solvay Business School in 1903. Ernest Solvay founded and funded a business-oriented institution under the name of École de Commerce Solvay, as a private initiative established with the support of the Brussels business community.

The Solvay Brussels School of Economics and Management was established in 2008 as a result of the merger of the Department of Economics and the Solvay Business School. In 2010, the new entity built a new building on the Solbosch/Solbos campus and became a full faculty of the Université libre de Bruxelles (ULB). More than 5.000 students attend some thirty programmes at the School today.

== Campus ==
The school is located in the Ixelles neighborhood of Brussels on the Solbosch, the central and largest campus of the Université libre de Bruxelles (ULB). The main building is situated on the corner of the Avenue Franklin Roosevelt/Franklin Rooseveltlaan and the Avenue Jeanne/Johannalaan near the Bois de la Cambre/Ter Kamerenbos, and was built in 2010.

== Academics ==
=== Programmes ===
The school grants academic undergraduate degrees (Bachelor of Science), academic master's degrees (Master of Science), advanced master's degrees (pre-experience) and professional/executive master's degrees (post-experience), including more than thirty Executive Education programmes.

==== Undergraduate B.Sc. programmes ====
- B.Sc. in Business Engineering (in French and in English)
- B.Sc. in economics (in French and in English)

==== Graduate M.Sc. programmes ====
Solvay currently offers six separate Master's of Science degrees in:

- M.Sc. in Business Engineering (partly French and English)
- M.Sc. in Management Science (English only)
- M.Sc. in Economics: Business Economics (partly French and English)
- M.Sc. in Economics: Governance and Public Policy In Europe (English only)
- M.Sc. in Economics: Research in Economics (English only)

Solvay also offers three complementary Master's of Science degrees (MCC: Master complémentaire conjoint) in:

- M.Sc. in Management
- M.Sc. in Microfinance
- M.Sc. in Data Science, Big Data (in English)

==== Postgraduate programmes (pre-experience) ====
These programmes are given by Solvay Lifelong Learning.

- Masters in Finance:
  - Advanced Master in Financial Markets
- Masters in Management:
  - Advanced Master in Innovation and Strategic Management
  - Advanced Master in Biotech and Medtech Ventures

==== Professional/Executive programmes (post-experience) ====
These programmes are given by Solvay Lifelong Learning.

- Executive master's programmes
  - Executive MBA
  - Accelerated Programme in Management
  - Executive Master in Tax Management (French-only)
  - Executive Master in Management
  - Executive Master in Digital Marketing & Sustainable Strategies
  - Executive Master in Cybersecurity Management
  - Executive Master in Information Risk and Cybersecurity
  - Executive Master en Management des Institutions de Santé et de Soins (French-only)
  - Executive Master in International Association Management
  - Executive Programme en Management et Philosophie
- Executive education programmes

==== Doctoral programmes ====
- PhD in economics (Economics and Statistics & Quantitative Economics)
- PhD in management (Management & Applied Economics)

=== Partners ===
The Solvay Brussels School of Economics and Management has developed a network of more than 140 partners in 40 countries, with whom some 230 student exchanges are organised each year. The School is the only in Belgium that requires students to undertake a six-month exchange programme in a university abroad. Such exchanges take place principally in Europe, within the framework of the SOCRATES and ERASMUS programmes, but also in the United States, Canada, Mexico, Peru, Argentina India (IIM Ahmedabad), Korea, Japan, Thailand, Vietnam, China, Taiwan and Singapore.

- Argentina:
  - Universidad de San Andrés
- Canada:
  - Goodman School of Business, Brock University
  - Carleton University
  - HEC Montréal
  - McGill University
  - Sauder School of Business, University of British Columbia
  - University of Lethbridge
- China:
  - Peking University HSBC Business School
- Mexico:
  - Tecnológico de Monterrey
- Peru:
  - Universidad del Pacifico
- United States
  - Darden Graduate School of Business Administration, University of Virginia
  - Fox School of Business, Temple University

=== Rankings and accreditations ===
- Financial Times 2016: 45st MSc in management (Europe)

== Solvay Lifelong Learning ==
Solvay Lifelong Learning (SLL) is the executive education division of the Solvay Brussels School of Economics and Management (SBS-EM), a faculty of the Université libre de Bruxelles (ULB) in Belgium. Established to address the evolving educational needs of professionals, managers, and entrepreneurs, SLL offers a comprehensive portfolio of programmes designed to support continuous personal and professional development.

=== History and Affiliation ===
Solvay Lifelong Learning operates under the umbrella of the Solvay Brussels School of Economics and Management, which traces its academic roots back over 120 years of excellence in business education, having been established in 1903 by industrialist Ernest Solvay. As a faculty of the Université libre de Bruxelles (ULB), the school maintains a strong academic foundation dedicated to training business leaders and entrepreneurs equipped to adapt to the evolving global landscape. Solvay Brussels School is recognized as the first French-speaking business school in Belgium to hold multiple international accreditations.

=== Academic Programs ===
The institution offers programs structured into three main categories: Advanced Masters, Executive Education, and Company-Specific Programmes.

==== Advanced Masters ====
These programs are primarily designed for recent Master's graduates and junior professionals, providing hands-on, practical knowledge to prepare them for successful careers in business. Examples include:

- Advanced Master in Innovation & Strategic Management
- Advanced Master in Financial Markets
- Advanced Master in Biotech & Medtech Ventures

==== Executive Education ====
The Executive Education portfolio is tailored for experienced professionals seeking to elevate their careers and drive transformative change within their organizations. The offerings cover various functional areas:

- General Management: Including the Executive MBA and the Accelerated Management Programme.
- Finance & Tax Management: Such as the Executive Master in Tax Management and Finance for Non-Financials.
- Digital Transformation & Governance: Including the Executive Master in Cybersecurity Management.
- Sustainability: Programs like Sustainability Fundamentals and the Executive Programme in Future-Proof Real Estate.
- Leadership: Focused on areas like People Leadership and Regenerative Leadership.

==== Company-Specific Programmes ====
Solvay Lifelong Learning partners with companies to develop tailor-made, in-house programs designed to address specific organizational challenges and enhance business performance for teams across management, finance, marketing, and strategy.

The core of the offering is a co-creation methodology to ensure the training effectively bridges the gap between an organization's current skills and its strategic goals. The design process involves:

1. Needs Analysis: Deeply analyzing the company's mission, strategy, teams, and specific challenges.
2. Programme Co-creation: Building a customized training journey based on specified objectives and business results. This process includes developing a skills map covering both technical and behavioral competencies.
3. Academic Team Selection: Selecting specialized experts and coaches who combine deep academic knowledge with practical professional experience.

The programs are built on four key pillars: Strategy, Practice, Collaboration, and the use of Activation Materials. Learning is practical, based on real-life cases, and integrates diverse media and interactive tools like business games, workshops, and field visits. To ensure the training acts as a "genuine agent of change," most programs incorporate elements like wrap-ups/takeaways for collaborative reflection, and individual coaching sessions to ensure participants translate learned skills into measurable business results. Expertise covers a wide range of areas, including Business Administration, Leadership, Sustainability, Innovation, and Digital Transformation.

=== Accreditations and Legacy ===
Solvay Lifelong Learning benefits from the legacy and international standing of the Solvay Brussels School. Key figures and distinctions associated with the school include:

- The school holds three international accreditations (including AMBA, EQUIS, and Qfor), placing it among a select group of globally recognized business schools.
- It maintains an extensive global network of 35,000+ alumni across more than 65 countries.
- The institution emphasizes a rigorous curriculum and a rich heritage of academic excellence, preparing professionals to navigate complex business challenges and lead transformations.

== Research ==
The Solvay Brussels School of Economics and Management is a research-based institution, in two respects. First, the duty of all core faculty members includes the production of scientific output (e.g. publications in peer-review international journals and scientific conferences) and the supervision of PhD candidates. Second, the SBS-EM provides an infrastructure for research, through its three main research centres, the CEB (Centre Emile Bernheim), DULBEA (Department in Applied Economics of ULB), and ECARES (European Centre for Advanced Research in Economics and Statistics), and their doctoral schools. Over the past 5 years, many publications have been produced, including 241 articles in international scientific journals and 41 books.

The CEB, ECARES and DULBEA are the main, 'broad-based', research centers affiliated to the SBS-EM. The two additional thematic research centers are CERMi (Centre Européen de Recherche en Microfinance / Center for European Research in Microfinance), and the Centre for Knowledge Economics (Centre de l'économie de la connaissance).

Affiliated to the SBS-EM, CEB is its research institute in management sciences. It aims to develop and promote advanced scientific research in management sciences. The centre hosts more than 75 (full-time and part-time) professors and researchers in key management disciplines. The CEB's teaching and research staff is currently active in the following management fields: accounting, marketing, business strategy, financial markets, corporate management, industrial economics, management of innovation and international trade.

DULBEA was founded by Etienne Sadi Kirschen in the 1950s, based on the new developments taking place in economics and the theory of econometrics. The DULBEA also gives prominence to recommendations in the field of economic policy.

ECARES, founded in 1991, began as a joint political initiative of the ULB Institute of European Studies and the Centre for Economic Policy Research (CEPR), a network of some 500 researchers in Europe.

CERMi (Centre Européen de Recherche en Microfinance / Center for European Research in Microfinance), draws together researchers, involved in microfinance activities in developing countries, from CEB and from the Research Centre Warocque (Université Mons-Hainaut). The CERMi also collabores with the European Microfinance Programme.

The Centre for Knowledge Economics allows the School to bring together all its researchers on one specific topic.

== Student life ==
The Solvay Brussels School of Economics and Management has an active student life, complementary to the student societies of the Université Libre de Bruxelles:

- Cercle Solvay, the student society of economics
- Bureau Etudiant Solvay, the student government
- Solvay Business Game, the business game
- High School Challenge
- Solvay Mentoring Program
- Solvay Consulting Club
- Solvay Finance Club

=== Solvay Finance Club ===
One of the youngest organisations is the Solvay Brussels School Student Finance Club, created in 2010. It is a student run organization that aims to offer its members a wide variety of finance related activities, whether it is investment banking, investment management, venture capital/private equity, or corporate finance. The founders' idea was to create a club that prepares its members for careers in the financial field by fostering an environment that helps them to translate their theoretical knowledge into practice, and that stimulates continuous learning and awareness of recent trends and developments. The club offers those pursuing careers in finance a professional and social network. It constitutes an interface between the finance industry and its members.

=== Solvay Consulting Club ===
In 2011, the SBS Student Consulting Club (SCC) was created. Its mission statement is: "The SCC conducts customized consulting services to deliver hands on solutions. It believes in cultivating integer people who drive entrepreneurship in all businesses and strive to functionally develop committed students." The organization is growing rapidly, both in terms of members and in terms of consulting projects conducted. It won the JADE Belgium Junior Enterprise Challenge in 2012.

The club aims at becoming a Junior Enterprise, which is a certified label by JADE.

=== ESTIEM ===
Besides the programs developed by the school, students also have the opportunity to take part in ESTIEM activities via the Local Group Brussels, part of Cercle Solvay. ESTIEM is the organisation for European Students of Industrial Engineering and Management, whose goal is to establish and foster relations between students across Europe and to support them in their personal and professional development, with a network consisting of 74 local groups in 28 countries, reaching out to 60,000 students.

== People ==
=== Faculty ===
- Paul Bairoch, economic historian
- Mathias Dewatripont, economist and member of the board of directors of the National Bank of Belgium
- Alain Eraly, economist and sociologist
- André Farber, business engineer and mathematician, former president of the European Finance Association
- Victor Ginsburgh, economist
- Étienne Sadi Kirschen, economist
- Ginette Kurgan, economic historian
- Peter Praet, member of the board of the European Central Bank and former Director of the National Bank of Belgium
- Gérard Roland, former professor at the Free University of Brussels and now professor at University of California, Berkeley
- André Sapir, economist and supervisor of the Sapir Report
- Françoise Thys-Clement, economist and former rector of the ULB
- Robert Tollet, economist
- Bruno van Pottelsberghe, economist and former Chief Economist of the European Patent Office

=== Alumni ===
The alumni network currently has a community of more than 20,000 members in more than 65 countries worldwide. The Solvay Alumni is the association that represents all graduates from the Solvay Brussels School of Economics and Management or one of its satellite institutions. Within the particular context of Belgium, a country marked in the past by religious and ideological rifts, alumni associations play an extremely important role, especially for the universities.

Notable alumni include the following:

==== Banking and financial services ====
- Bruno Colmant, CEO of Banque Degroof Petercam, former CEO of NYSE Euronext
- Stephane De Baets, founder of international asset management firm Elevated Returns and pioneer in blockchain-based real estate investing
- Pierre Drion, former CEO of Pertcam, chairman of the Fondation ULB
- Pierre Lagrange, partner and co-founder of GLG Partners
- Dominique Leroy, CEO of Proximus Group
- François Narmon, former CEO of Dexia, former president of the Belgian Olympic Committee
- Gilles Samyn, CEO of Compagnie Nationale à Portefeuille or CNP

==== General management ====
- Didier Bellens, former CEO of Belgacom, former CEO of the Groupe Bruxelles Lambert
- Alain Deneef, Belgian businessman
- Paul Deneve, vice-president of Apple, former CEO of Yves Saint Laurent
- Christian Jourquin, former CEO of Solvay
- Dominique Leroy, CEO of Belgacom
- Alexandre Vandamme, Belgian businessman and board member of Inbev

==== Government / public service / non-profit ====
- Hubert Ansiaux, governor of the National Bank of Belgium (1957–1971)
- Rik Daems, politician
- Eugène de Barsy, former President of the Belgian Banking, Finance and Insurance Commission (CBFA)
- Paul De Groote, Minister for National Recovery (1947–1949)
- Lodewijk De Raet, economist and politician
- Maurice Frère, governor of the National Bank of Belgium (1944–1957)
- Camille Gutt, Head of the International Monetary Fund
- Jean-Paul Harroy, Governor of Ruanda-Urundi
- Paul Hatry, Belgian politician, former Minister
- Roberto Lavagna, former Minister of Economy and Production of Argentina
- Amer Husni Lutfi, former Syrian Minister of Economy
- André Oleffe, former Belgian Minister of Economy
- Eliane Tillieux, Belgian Minister of Health
- Michel van den Abeele, former Director-General of the European Commission, Director-General of Eurostat and Permanent Representative of the European Commission to the OCDE and UNESCO

==== Academics ====
- Marianne Bertrand, Professor of Economics at the University of Chicago
- Claude Javeau, Professor of sociology
- Robert Tollet, economist, professor at ULB and former president of the Conseil central de l'Économie

==== Sports ====
- Paul Frère, Belgian Racing driver and journalist
- Claire Michel, Belgian professional triathlete and Olympian

==== Entertainment ====
- Anthony Asael, Belgian photographer and explorer
- Guillaume de Posch, CEO of RTL Group, former CEO of ProSiebenSat.1
- Jean-Paul Philippot, CEO of French-speaking public broadcast company RTBF
- Philippe Swan, Belgian singer and songwriter
- Jean Van Hamme, writer
- Alex Vizorek, humorist and actor
