= John J. Goossens =

John J., Baron Goossens (25 November 1944 – 8 November 2002) was a Belgian businessman. He was the Chief Executive Officer of Belgacom and chairman of the Royal Automobile Club of Belgium. He acceded to the Belgian hereditary nobility with the personal title of baron in May 2002.

== Education ==
After his secondary education at the Collège Saint Michel in Brussels, he obtained a licentiate, in trade - and financial sciences from the Louvain School of Management at the Université catholique de Louvain (UCLouvain) in 1968. In 1971, he obtained a Master of Business Administration at the Columbia University in New York. He was a member of "Up with People".

== Career ==
In 1968, he started his career at General Motors Overseas Corporation. In 1971, he left the United States and returned to Belgium as a management trainee at Texaco. In 1976, he was promoted to sales manager and then general manager. In 1989, John Goossens took the lead of the Antwerp subsidiary company of the French telecom group, Alcatel Bell.

In 1995, he succeeded Bessel Kok as the head of Belgacom. He thus became the first CEO representing the new S.A. Belgacom after its privatization. He prepared the company for the liberalization of the telecom market via the plans Turbo and BeST. In 2003 he was succeeded by Didier Bellens.

== Literature ==
- Y.-W. DELZENNE & J. HOUYOUX, Le nouveau dictionnaire des Belges, 1998.
- Humbert DE MARNIX DE SAINTE-ALDEGONDE, État présent de la noblesse belge, Annuaire 2007, Brussel, 2007.

== Sources ==
- John J. Goossens (in French)
