= Scarlet (company) =

Belgian telecommunications company

- Scarlet logo
- Type: Subsidiary
- Industry: Telecommunications
- Founded: 1992 in the Netherlands.
- Founder: Paul Gelderloos
- Defunct: 1 October 2022
- Headquarters: Brussels, Belgium
- Area served: Belgium
- Products: Fixed line and mobile telephony, internet, digital television
- Owner: Proximus Group
- Parent: Part of the Proximus Group since 1 October 2022.
- Website: scarlet.be

Scarlet is a Belgian low-cost telecom brand of the Proximus Group, established in 1992, that offers fixed and mobile telephony, fixed internet and digital television services. Originally founded in the Netherlands, it became active in Belgium in 1997 and is a part of the Proximus Group since February 2008.

Scarlet was the first to scrap roaming charges in EU countries, over a year before the official EU regulations abolished intra-European Union roaming.

== Netherlands ==
Scarlet was founded in the Netherlands in 1992 by Paul Gelderloos as an independent ISP and telephony provider, initially part of U.S.-based Telegroup. In 1999, it went independent with investors like NeSBIC CTE Fund (part of Fortis) and Egeria, the Brenninkmeijer family's firm.

Acquired by Belgacom Group (Proximus since 2014) in 2008, its Dutch operations split in 2011 and were divested via management buy-out in June 2014, rebranded as Stipte ('punctual' in Dutch), later acquired by Fiber Netherlands in 2016.

== Belgium ==
The brand entered the Belgian market in 1997 and grew through acquisitions such as KPN Belgium (2002), Planet Internet Belgium (2003), and Tiscali Belgium (2004).

Scarlet gained widespread recognition in the Netherlands and Belgium in 2004 with the launch of Scarlet One: the first dual-play package on the market featuring ADSL internet and VoDSL telephony over internet.

On 15 February 2008, Scarlet Belgium was acquired by the then Belgacom Group (renamed Proximus in 2014). The Dutch and Belgian operations were separated in 2011. The Dutch branch was sold in 2014 following a management buy-out and renamed Stipte through a rebranding.

Since 1 October 2022, Scarlet has been fully integrated into Proximus NV, and remains active in Belgium as a commercial trademark with a focus on price-quality.

== BIPT Rate Studies ==
In both 2024 and 2025 reports by the Belgian Institute for Postal Services and Telecommunications (BIPT), Scarlet ranked as a top choice for value across nearly all user profiles, from standalone internet to full packs.

== Fixed telephony and digital TV services ==
Scarlet offers television services also in HD using IPTV service of its parent company Proximus.

Scarlet offers fixed telephony and digital TV services in Belgium, only available through packs that bundle them with internet, included in select Trio packs, combining internet, TV and a fixed line or mobile phone subscription.

=== Television stations per region ===
- Brussels
- Flanders
- Wallonia

== Scarlet in the Caribbean ==
From 2008 to 2011, Belgacom was also the owner of Scarlet B.V., which had been active since 2000 in the Netherlands Antilles, specifically on Curaçao and Sint Maarten, offering GSM subscriptions and EZ-TALK calling cards. The company also provided WiMAX solutions on the islands and ADSL subscriptions under the "Carib-online" brand.
