= Claude Javeau =

Belgian sociologist and professor (1940–2021)

- Born: 22 September 1940; Liège, Belgium
- Died: 12 August 2021 (aged 80); Brussels, Belgium
- Occupations: Sociologist; Professor

Claude Javeau (22 September 1940 – 12 August 2021) was a Belgian sociologist and professor.

He studied at the Solvay Brussels School of Economics and Management. He was a professor of sociology at the Université libre de Bruxelles from 1987 to 2005. He also succeeded Henri Janne as the university's Director of the Center for General Sociology. He was a guest professor at multiple universities.

Claude Javeau died in Brussels on 12 August 2021 at the age of 80.

== Publications ==
- La société au jour le jour : écrits sur la vie quotidienne (1991)
- L’enquête par questionnaire. Manuel à l’usage du praticien (1992)
- Leçons de sociologie (1997)
- Six novelettes obliques (1997)
- Prendre le futile au sérieux (1998)
- Deux images et le désir (1999)
- Dieu est-il gnangnan? (1999)
- Le Petit Murmure et le Bruit du monde (1999)
- Esquisse d'une histoire naturelle du plouc (2000)
- Mourir (2000)
- Le Bricolage du social. Un traité de sociologie (2001)
- Se perd(u)re(r) (2001)
- La Culotte de Madonna (2001)
- L'Éloge de l'élitisme (2002)
- Fragments d'une philosophie de la parfaite banalité (2002)
- Petit manuel d'épistémologie des sciences du social (2003)
- Des Impostures sociologiques (2014)
- Je hais le football (2015)
