= Aloïs Michielsen =

Belgian businessman

Aloïs Michielsen (born Turnhout, Belgium, 6 January 1942) is a Belgian businessman. He obtained a master's degree as a civil engineer (chemistry) and a degree in applied economic sciences at the Universite Catholique de Louvain (Belgium). He obtained a PhD on studies in business administration at the University of Chicago (U.S.).

He started his career in the Solvay Group on 6 January 1969, at the Marketing Division. On 31 May 1990, he was appointed director and member of the executive committee. On 14 April 1994 he was appointed vice-chairman of the executive committee, and on 4 June 1998, he was appointed chairman of the executive committee. On 9 May 2006 he took over the chair of the board of directors from Baron Daniel Janssen, while Christian Jourquin succeeded him as chairman of the executive committee.

He was made Chevalier de l’Ordre de Léopold (Belgium) in 1988.

== Sources ==
- Aloïs Michielsen
