= Jean-Paul Philippot =

Belgian television executive

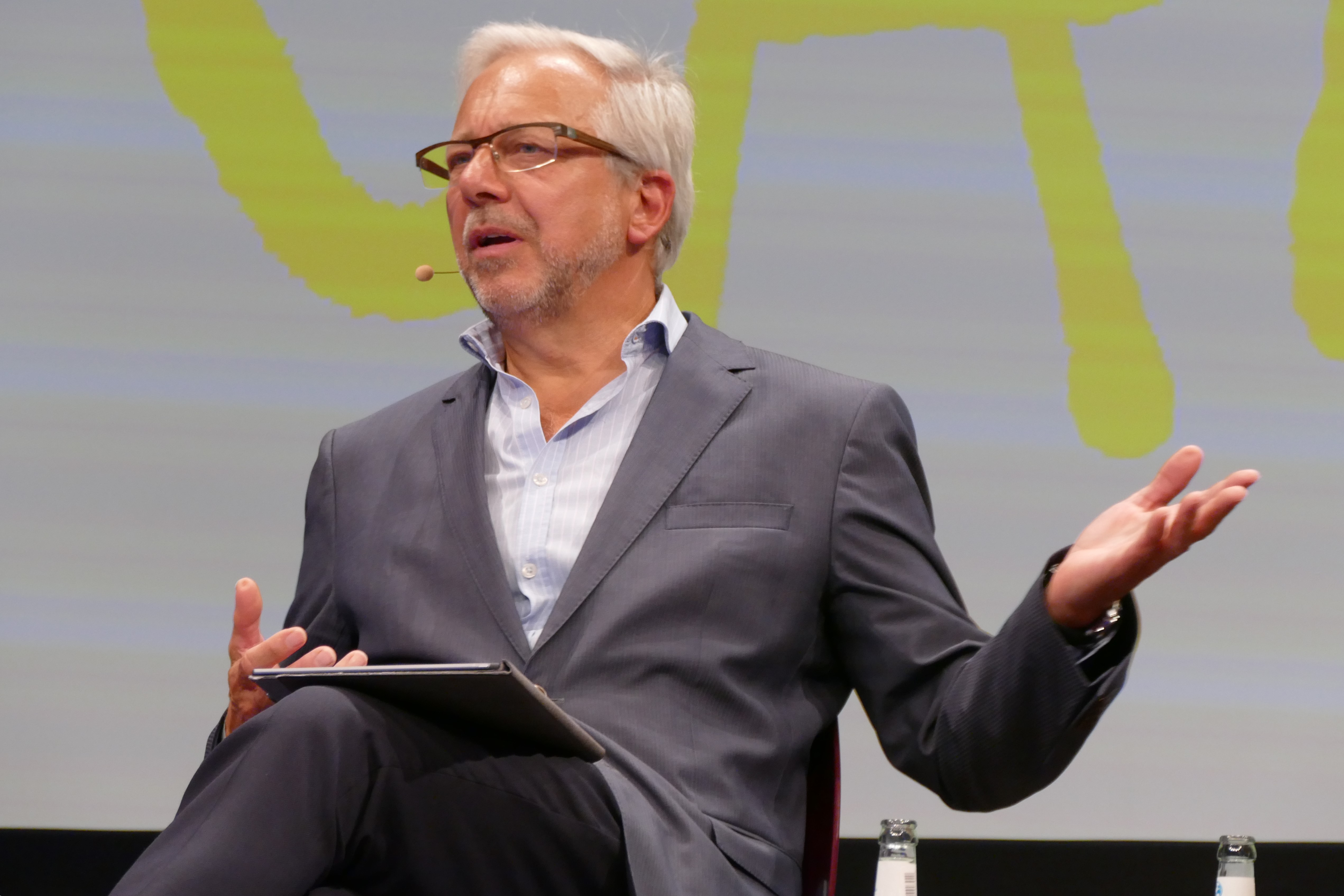
Jean-Paul Philippot in 2024

Jean-Paul Philippot (French: [ʒɑ̃ pɔl filipɔ]; born June 26, 1960) is the current administrator-general of Radio télévision belge de la communauté française (RTBF) and a former president on the European Broadcasting Union (EBU).

== Background ==
Born in Liège, Belgium, on 26 June 1960, Philippot graduated in Commercial Engineering from the Solvay Business School of the Université libre de Bruxelles in 1984.

== Career ==
Philippot was appointed administrator general of the RTBF in 2002 and immediately embarked on a policy of retrenchment and centralisation recommended by Andersen Consulting, which led to strikes and protests.

In December 2015 the former editor-in-chief of the RTBF television news accused him of being in the pocket of the Socialist party. In March 2016 Philippott was reported to be the best-paid public employee in French-speaking Belgium, and the only one whose annual pay exceeded the statutory maximum of 250,000 euros. In April 2016 he told a parliamentary committee on media that the RTBF was not top-heavy with managers and they were not overpaid.

He was elected as the president of the EBU at the general meeting in July 2008 held in Budapest, Hungary. In 2016 he was re-elected for his fifth consecutive term.
