= Philippe Vander Putten =

Belgian businessman (born 1959)

Philippe Vander Putten (born 1959) is a Belgian businessman. He is the former chief executive officer of Brussels Airlines and the CEO of the Belgian Olympic Committee.

== Education ==
Vander Putten earned a master's degree in management at the IAG (now Louvain School of Management) of the University of Louvain (UCLouvain, Belgium). He obtained an MBA at the University of South Carolina.

== Career ==
In 1982 he started his career as assistant brand manager at Procter & Gamble Benelux. In 1984 he began working for L'Oréal Belgilux. From 1986 until 1998 he worked for Kraft and Kraft Jacobs Suchard, where he became vice-president for Europe. In 1994 he was elected Marketeer of the Year. On 1 September 1998, he became the CEO of Proximus, where he succeeded Jan Neels. He then became the CEO of Brussels Airlines, resulting of the merger between SN Brussels Airlines and Virgin Express. He resigned in 2008 as CEO of Brussels Airlines. After that he worked for smaller companies, such as Cleverphone (temporary phone numbers) and Distec (distributor of scientific equipment). On 1 September 2013, he became CEO of the Belgian Olympic and Interfederal Committee. He is a director of the Fountain group and of Viangros.

== Family ==
Philippe Vander Putten is married and father of three children.

== Sources ==
- Philippe Vander Putten
- Philippe Vander Putten, CEO Brussels Airlines
- Philippe Vander Putten Photo
