= Michel Tilmant =

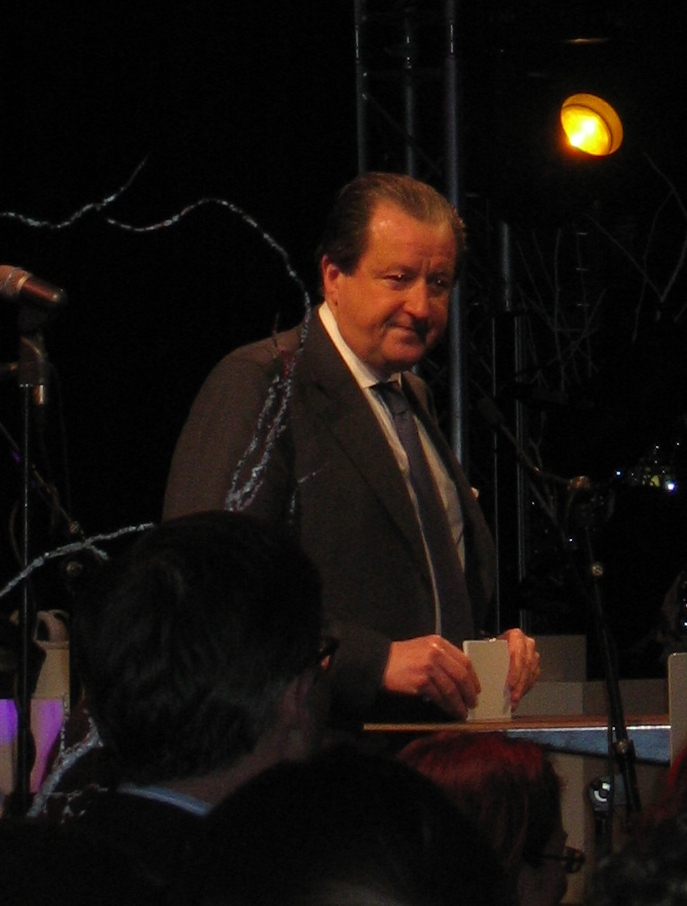
- Michel Tilmant at a Christmas drink in 2007 at ING
- Born: 21 July 1952
- Occupation: Banker
- Known for: ING Group

Michel Tilmant (born 21 July 1952) is a banker and the former CEO of ING Group, a globally operating banking and insurance business based in the Netherlands.

== Biography ==
Tilmant, a French speaking Belgian, graduated from the Université catholique de Louvain (Louvain School of Management) in Business Administration and European Affairs. He began his career in finance with Morgan Guaranty Trust Company of New York, serving as Head of European Investor Services in Paris and London, Head of Operations Services in New York, and General Manager of the Brussels branch. In 1991 he became Chief Operating Officer of Banque Internationale à Luxembourg. In 1992, Tilmant joined the Executive Committee of Bank Brussels Lambert (BBL). He became CEO in 1997, one year before ING acquired BBL. That year, he became Chairman of ING Barings and in his appointment as Vice-Chairman of the ING Group and CEO of ING Europe followed in 2000. In April 2004, he succeeded Ewald Kist as CEO of the ING Group.

Dutch Finance Minister Wouter Bos wanted to dismiss ING CEO Michel Tilmant in October 2008, when the government ING capital injection of 10 billion euros was granted. Finance Minister Bos temporarily abandoned the idea since no replacement was available. In January 2009 Tilmant was replaced by Jan Hommen, chairman of the non-executive board. A little over a year before, on 8 November 2007, the same Tilmant had threatened in (the Dutch Financial Times (FD)) to have ING headquarters moved to Brussels to enable him to pay himself and his staff higher salaries and bonuses. He was critical on the moderate economic climate in the Netherlands. He was particularly annoyed with the quality of education and the debate on excessive pay in the Netherlands.

On 26 January 2009 ING announced that he would give up the CEO position because of the "special developments of the previous months and his personal condition".

On 25 January 2010, one year after his sudden resignation, Tilmant refused to be questioned by the 'Commissie de Wit' the Dutch Financial Crisis Inquiry Commission on the occurrences that led to the technical bankruptcy of ING under his jurisdiction. Former Non Executive Board Member and former Labor Prime Minister of the Netherlands Wim Kok was severely criticized for his explanation on his ratification of the extravagant salary increase (584%) granted to Tilmant and his board in 2004 to stay in line with salaries paid in the Banking industry. After leaving ING, Tilmant joined the board of the Luxembourg-based Foyer Group as an executive director.
