= John Cordier =

John Cordier (1 September 1941 – 22 January 2002) was a Belgian businessman.

== Life and career ==
He founded Telindus in 1969, a modem and network component company. In October 1999 he succeeded Julien De Wilde as President of the board of directors of Agoria.

John Cordier was also very active in supporting sports, he served as President of the Belgian football club K.V. Mechelen for eleven years from 1982 to 1993. Under his management and thanks to his financial support the club became an important player in Belgian soccer during that period, and beat AFC Ajax in the UEFA Cup Winners' Cup final in 1988.

== Sources ==
- John Cordier overleden
- John Cordier overleden
