= Jean-Claude Logé =

Belgian businessman (born 1941)

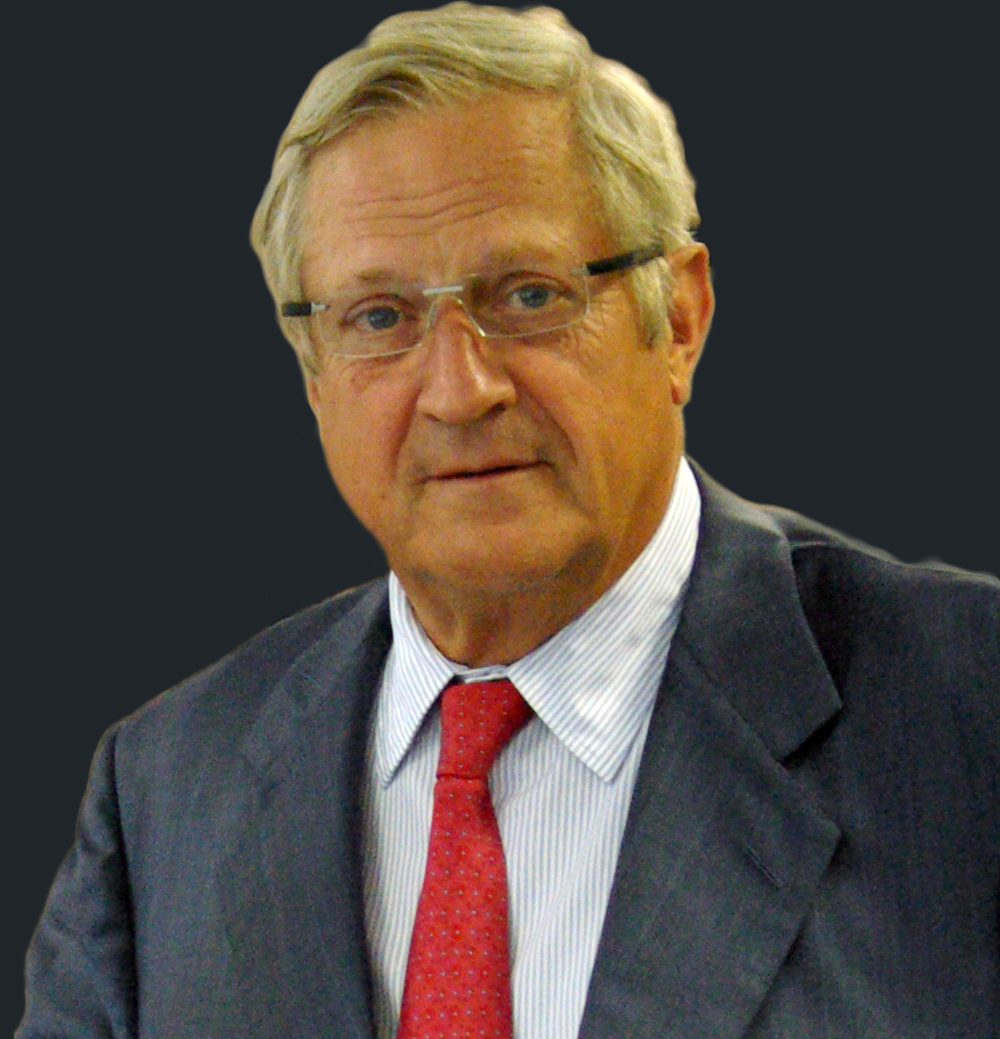
- Logé in 2008
- Born: 30 March 1941 (age 85)
- Education: Master's degree in business science and finance at Louvain School of Management
- Occupation: Businessman

Jean-Claude Logé (born 30 March 1941) is a Belgian businessman. He obtained a master's degree in business science and finance at the Louvain School of Management (University of Louvain) in 1963. In December 1984 Jean-Claude Logé, together with Bernard Lescot and Pierre Herpain, created the ICT company Systemat. In 1996, the readers of the Belgian weekly business magazine Trends Tendances elected him Manager of the Year.

In January 2011, he left the management of his company to retire in Africa. He creates a foundation, the HDC Cap Skiring foundation, in Senegal.

Returning to Belgium in 2016, Jean-Claude Logé was the victim of a scam led by his second wife, Huguette Elsocht, who seized his property in Senegal.

In 2017, he published his book under the title Systemafric 1.0 and 2.0 with Éditions de l'Hirondelle, in which he recounts his life as an entrepreneur and his African setbacks as a billionaire ex-big boss.
