= Christian Jourquin =

Belgian businessman

- Education: Solvay Brussels School of Economics and Management; Harvard Business School
- Occupation: Businessman

Christian Jourquin is a Belgian businessman and chief executive officer of Solvay between May 2006 and May 2012, a Belgian chemical and pharmaceutical company.

== Education ==
He graduated in commercial engineering at the Solvay Brussels School of Economics and Management (Belgium). In addition he graduated from the International Senior Management Program of the Harvard Business School (United States).

== Career ==
He started his professional career at Solvay in 1971 and has worked for the group ever since. In 1971, he started his career as an Attaché to the finance department of Solvay at the Italian headquarters in Milan. Between 1980 and 1990, he managed Solvay Duphar in the Netherlands, which represented a large part of the international pharmaceutical activities of Solvay. Between 1990 and 1996, he worked for Solvay at the Iberian Peninsula (Spain and Portugal), Solvay Interox in 1996 and the processing sector of the group from 1997 to 2000. He was general manager of the chemicals sector at Solvay SA until 30 April 2006 and since May 2006 he has been chief executive officer and chairman of the executive committee of Solvay SA, till May 2012. He also served as director of Solvay America, Inc.

== Sources ==
- Christian Jourquin
- Christian Jourquin
