= Telindus =

Belgian telecommunications company

- Type: first independent, later subsidiary
- Industry: ICT
- Founded: 1969
- Headquarters: Heverlee Belgium
- Key people: Michel De Coster, CEO
- Products: ICT Products and Services
- Revenue: €618 million in 2005
- Website: www.telindus.com

Telindus was a legal entity based in Belgium that offered ICT services and solutions to the corporate and public sector, both in Belgium and internationally. These solutions also contained management and support services in relation to their ICT contracts.

Telindus was founded by John Cordier in 1969. Based in Heverlee, which is a part of Leuven, it was listed on the stock market in 1985 and grew in Europe by taking over various companies. In 2005, it achieved a turnover of €618 million, had 2,750 employees, and was present in 6 western European countries.

In January 2006 Belgium's largest telecommunications provider Belgacom Group, today named Proximus Group acquired Telindus for it to become its IT services subsidiary. Telindus continued to operate under the brand name Telindus - Proximus ICT. On January 4, 2010 the existence of Telindus as a legal entity ended as it was then fully absorbed into the Proximus Group. The Group retains Telindus as a brand name.

== Company history ==
- 1969 Start of the Group's activities. John Cordier is appointed Director.
- 1979 The first foreign subsidiary is opened in Luxembourg. New subsidiaries are soon established in France, Italy, Germany, the Netherlands, Spain, Switzerland, and the United Kingdom.
- 1985 Telindus is listed on the Stock Exchange.
- 1996 Infrastructure and security service capabilities for various operators are further developed in the late 1990s.
- 2001 Telindus begins to acquire companies across Europe.
- 2006 Telindus is taken over by the Belgacom Group, today named Proximus Group but retains its brand, corporate identity, and autonomy. Belgacom's Network & System Integration department is incorporated into Telindus.
- 2008 Belgacom today named Proximus narrows Telindus country focus: Belgacom is reducing the number of country offices at its ICT services unit Telindus. The company will maintain offices in Belgium, the Netherlands, Luxembourg, France, the UK, Ireland and Spain, but eight other country organisations (Germany, Italy, Portugal, Switzerland, Sweden, Thailand, China) where the units are too small or making losses.
- 2010 On January 4, 2010, Belgacom, today named Proximus ends the existence of Telindus as a legal entity and absorbs all of its operations into those of the Group.
- 2011 Belgacom, today named Proximus divests Telindus Ireland and Telindus Spain to Agile Networks and Acuntia respectively leaving 5 country organisations.
- 2014 Belgacom, today named Proximus enters negotiations with Vivendi to sell its stake in Telindus France.
- 2015 Proximus signed an agreement on 3 December 2015 to purchase all the other shares in Telindus Luxembourg. As a result, Proximus will own 100% of the share capital of Telindus Luxembourg.
