= Mobile messaging operator =

A mobile messaging operator is a specialized form of mobile network operator that provides mobile messaging services such as SMS or Multimedia Messaging Service to businesses or other mobile operators.

== Types of mobile messaging operators ==
There are two types of mobile messaging operators, aggregators and SS7 (Signaling System 7) providers.

The aggregator model involves the mobile messaging operator signing multiple individual agreements with mobile operators to facilitate two-way SMS traffic through that operator's SMSC (Short Message Service Center). SMS messages are delivered to the operator's SMSC, but not the subscriber's handset; the SMSC takes care of further handling of the message through the SS7 network.

The SS7 model enables mobile messaging operators to route data directly through the SS7 system, giving the provider greater control and visibility of the transmission path during SMS routing. In this way, SMS messages can be sent directly to and from recipients without having to go through the SMSCs of other mobile operators.

Some mobile messaging operators also operate a mixed model, combining SS7 and aggregated connectivity.

== Uses of mobile messaging operators ==
Mobile messaging operators can provide businesses or other mobile operators with a range of messaging services, including:

- SMS transmission and reception
- Short codes and long numbers
- Mobile ticketing
- Mobile authentication services Two-factor authentication#Wireless Tokens
- Premium rate SMS services Premium rate SMS#Premium-rated short messages
- SMS Voting
- Mobile interaction services

== See also ==
- SMS gateway
- Bulk messaging
