= Paul Deneve =

Belgian businessman (born 1961)

- Born: 16 February 1961 (age 65); Brussels
- Education: Solvay Brussels School of Economics and Management (ULB); University of Chicago; Stanford University
- Occupations: Former vice president at Apple; former president and CEO of YSL
- Years active: 1985
- Board member of: Comité Colbert

Paul Deneve (born 16 February 1961) is a Belgian business executive and former vice president at Apple from 2013 to 2017. He is the former chief executive of Yves Saint Laurent (YSL), a subsidiary of Kering. Between 1997 and 2013, he managed a number of companies in the luxury sector, including Courreges, Nina Ricci, Lanvin and YSL.

== Early life and education ==
Deneve grew up in Belgium. He graduated from the Solvay Business School at ULB, University of Brussels. He also holds an MBA from the University of Chicago and an MSc in Management from Stanford University.

== Career ==
Deneve began his career in 1985 as an internal auditor at ExxonMobil EMEA, before becoming a financial controller at Oriflame International. He then went on to hold several sales and marketing positions within Apple Europe, from 1990 until 1997.

In 1997, Deneve joined the fashion house Courreges as Managing Director and went on to take the helm of Nina Ricci between 2003 and 2005. He was President of Lanvin from 2006 to 2008, where he worked closely with the Artistic Director Alber Elbaz.

In April 2011, Deneve was made President and CEO of YSL and in March 2012, he announced the appointment of Hedi Slimane as Creative Director.

In July 2013, Apple Inc announced Deneve will be joining the company as vice president. In their announcement, Apple Inc specified that Deneve would work on "special projects" and report directly to Tim Cook. He assumed the role that September 16, then began working on the Apple Watch. During his tenure, he brought in other YSL execs to Apple, including Catherine Monier, then YSL Europe president and retail director. In December 2017, Deneve officially left Apple.

Alongside the film producer Stuart Parr, Paul Deneve acquired and developed the Venetian velvet slippers ("friulane") company Piedàterre.

== Boards ==
Since May 2012, he has been a member of the Executive Committee of the Fédération Française de la Couture, du Prêt-à-Porter des Couturiers et des Créateurs de Mode (English: French Federation of Fashion and of Ready-to-Wear of Couturiers and Fashion Designers), as well as a jury member for the ANDAM Fashion Awards.

In 2008 he was elected member of the board of the Comité Colbert, the French luxury goods association, and was subsequently re-elected in June 2012.

Deneve is an advisor to several Silicon Valley start-ups, and is a Sloan Fellow at Stanford University.

== Personal life ==
Deneve is married with Anne-Sophie Deneve, an art collector.
