= Didier Bellens =

Belgian businessman

- Born: 9 June 1955
- Died: 28 February 2016 (aged 60)
- Education: Solvay Business School
- Occupation: Businessman

Didier Bellens (9 June 1955 – 28 February 2016) was a Belgian businessman. Until 15 November 2013, he was the CEO of Belgacom, the leading telecommunications company of Belgium. He was married and had three children. He died on 28 February 2016.

== Education ==
Bellens graduated in 1978 as a commercial engineer at the Solvay Business School of the Université Libre de Bruxelles (Brussels).

== Career ==
Bellens started his career in 1978 as an auditor at Deloitte Haskins & Sells. During his time at Deloitte he was engaged on the audits of the Belgian subsidiary of General Motors. In 1981 he became financial director of the Compagnie Brussel Lambert holding (GBL). He managed the investment portfolio and prospected potential investments. He became Deputy Manager of the Pargesa Holding in Geneva in 1985, where he was responsible for the management of holdings, mergers and acquisitions. Didier Bellens managed the participations of the GBL group in the company.

In 1992 Didier Bellens came back to the Groupe Bruxelles Lambert as Managing Director, taking charge of the group's strategic participations in companies such as Royale Belge, the BBL, and the CLT. He played an instrumental role in the merger between AXA and Royale Belge, and the change and the negotiations leading to the merger between CLT (Compagnie Luxembourgeoise de Télédiffusion) and UFA. He also participated in the exchange of shares between RTL and Bertelsmann, which gave RTL a minority participation in Bertelsmann, and the change of ownership of the BBL. He joined the RTL Group in 2001, which was created through the merger of CTL-UFA and Pearson Television (now FremantleMedia), as its CEO, where he focused on the group's international expansion. He concluded the merger with Pearson Television and launched the RTL Group on the stock market.

In March 2003, Didier Bellens was appointed Belgacom's president and chief executive officer as the successor to John J. Goossens. In March 2009 his mandate at Belgacom was renewed in March for a six-year term. His position at the head of Belgacom almost ended in 2011 after a strong dispute with the company board and the Belgian federal minister for Civil Service and Public Enterprises, Inge Vervotte. After a few incidents (accusation of conflict of interest, derogatory comments about the government, alleged covert promotion of confidante) the government decided in 2013 the relationship of trust was seriously damaged and Didier Bellens' position was no longer justifiable. He was dismissed on the basis of serious professional misconduct.

== Other activities ==
Bellens was a member of the Board of Directors of Belgacom ICS, the Telindus Group, Proximus, Scarlet SA, and Tango. He was also a member of the Board of Directors of AXA Belgium, VOKA (the Flemish Chamber of Commerce and Industry) and was on the steering committee of the FEB (Federation of Commerce in Belgium). In addition, he served as independent Chairman of the Appointments and Remuneration Committee, and as independent Director of the Board of Directors of the Compagnie Immobilière de Belgique. He was also advisor to CV Capital Partners and member of the International Advisory Council of the New York Stock Exchange.

He was also a member of the Board of Directors of the Erasmus Foundation and the ULB Foundation, and served as Vice Chairman of the Solvay Business School's Consultative Council.

In April 2016, Bellens was named in the Panama Papers.
