= TeleSign =

American digital identity company

Telesign
- Company type: Acquired by BICS
- Founded: 2005
- Headquarters: Marina del Rey, {{{location_country}}}
- Key people: Christophe Van de Weyer (CEO), Thomas Dhondt (CFO), Mark Hydar (CTO)
- Industry: Digital identity, fraud prevention, communications
- Products: Voice; SMS; Digital Identity; 2FA; RCS
- Website: www.telesign.com

Telesign is a California-based company offering digital identity verification and communication services. Their technology helps businesses prevent fraud and improve customer interactions. Telesign's CEO is Christophe Van de Weyer.

== History ==
Telesign was founded in 2005 by Darren Berkovitz, Ryan Disraeli, and Stacy Stubblefield. The company introduced two-factor authentication as a security measure for online accounts. Its founders were recognized as entrepreneurial alumni by USC, and the company originated from the Curious Minds technology incubator.

As of 2014, the company had raised $49 million in funds.

In April 2017, Telesign announced that it is being acquired by BICS, a Belgium-based company for $230 million.

In December 2021, Telesign announced it intends to go public via a business combination with North Atlantic Acquisition Corporation (NASDAQ: NAAC).
