= Proximus Group =

Belgian telecommunication company

Proximus public limited company under Belgian public law
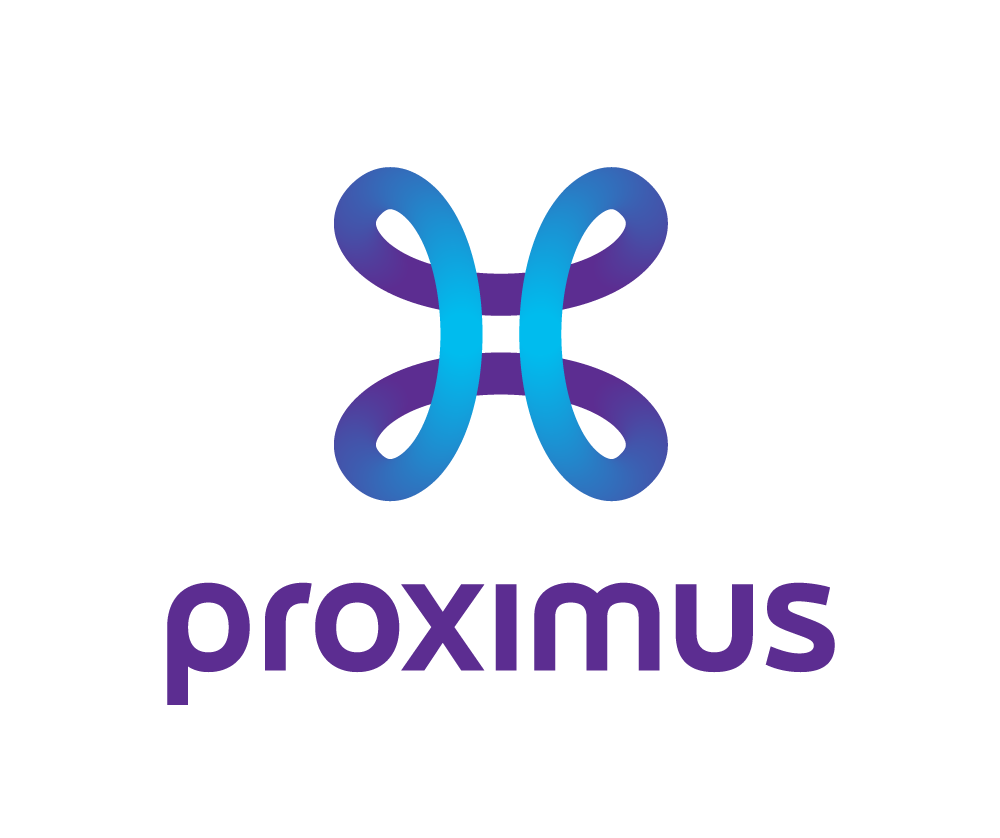

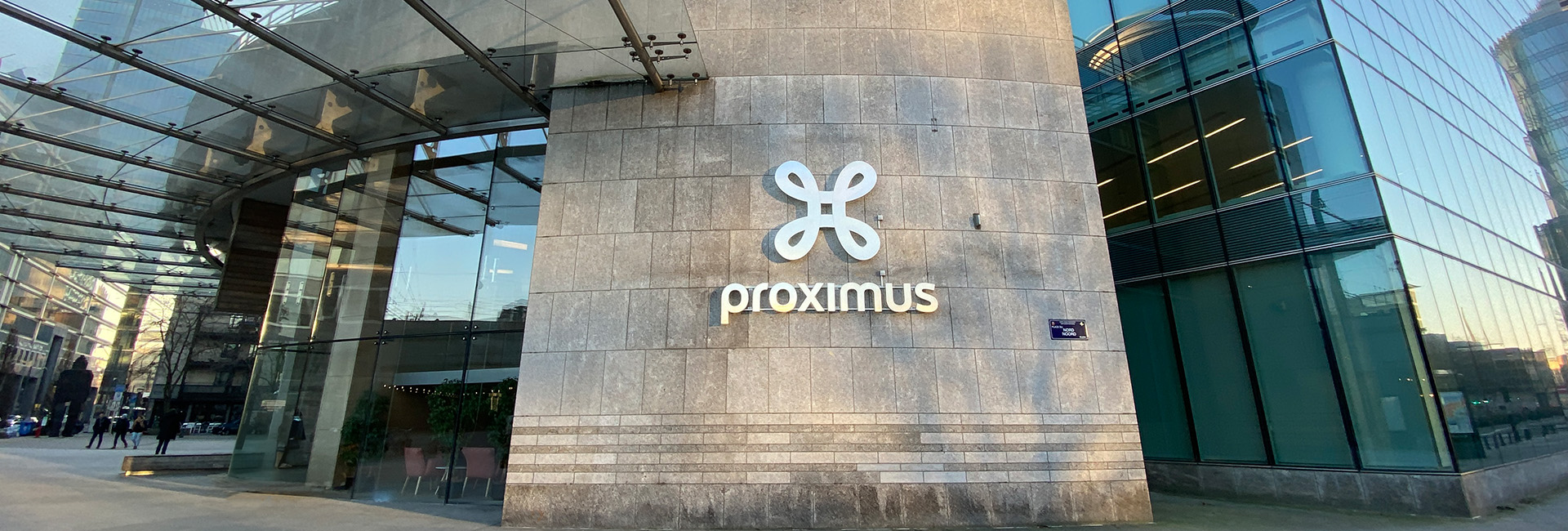
- Trade name: Proximus Group
- Native name: Proximus NV van publiek recht/SA de droit public
- Type: Publicly listed statutory corporation
- Industry: Telecommunications
- Headquarters: Brussels, Belgium
- Key people: Stijn Bijnens (CEO); Stefaan De Clerck (Chairman)
- Products: Fixed line and mobile telephony, internet, digital television, IT services
- Revenue: €6.430 billion (2024)
- Net income: €447 million (2023)
- Owner: Belgian Government (53.51%)
- Number of employees: 11,654 (2023)
- Website: proximus.com

The Proximus Group is a provider of digital services and communication solutions operating in Belgium and international markets. In Belgium, the company offers its main products and services under the brands Proximus, Scarlet, and Mobile Vikings. The Group also operates in Luxembourg as Proximus Luxembourg SA, with the brands Tango and Telindus Luxembourg, and in the Netherlands as Telindus Netherlands. Internationally, activities are carried out by BICS, Route Mobile and Telesign. Proximus Accelerators is the ecosystem of IT partners Be-Mobile, ClearMedia, Codit, Davinsi Labs, Proximus Spearit and Telindus.

Since 31 December 2023, 53.51% of the Proximus Group is owned by the Belgian State. Proximus owns 4.56% of its own shares, and the remaining 41.93% are free tradable on the market.

== History ==
=== 1879 to 1914: the beginning of telephony in Belgium ===
The Belgian telegraph services installed a telephone line in parliament in 1879, marking the start of telephony in the country. Subsequently, private entrepreneurs applied to operate telephone networks in various Belgian cities, prompting the government to establish a legislative framework to regulate telephony. By 1896, the entire telephone sector came under government ownership.

By 1913, most railway stations and post offices had public telephone booths.

=== From World War I to 1930: transition to an autonomous public company ===
During World War I, telecommunications in Belgium came to an abrupt end due to the state-owned company's financial dependence. The damage and dismantling of networks during the war required massive investments. On 19 July 1930, the RTT (French: Régie des Télégraphes et des Téléphones, lit. 'Telegraph and Telephone Administration') was founded, the Belgian national telegraph and telephone company. Increasingly, people started using telephones at home.

=== 1930 to World War II: RTT's integration into the state's industrial policy ===
Through the RTT, the government invested huge sums in the Belgian telephone network. A growing portion of the population from various social classes now had access to telephony.

At the same time, another phenomenon emerged, which soon became a heavy burden for the company. During the economic crisis of the 1930s, the government used RTT in its industrial and employment policies. By forcing complete automation of the Belgian telephone network, the government tried to reduce the high unemployment rate in the sector. This strongly restricted the autonomy of the RTT.

The 1930 law clearly stated that the company could independently design and implement an investment program. However, by imposing its employment policy, the government directly contradicted the basic principle of the law. This led to a structural problem at the RTT soon after the war.

=== From World War II to 1986: from high-tech company to crisis ===
Immediately after World War II, the RTT faced significant damage and partial dismantling of its networks. To quickly revive the sector, the government decided to provide financial assistance. During this period, the demand for telecommunication services increased rapidly. The number of subscribers grew significantly: from approximately 350,000 in 1946 to 522,000 in 1951 and then to over a million in 1965. This growth in the customer base led to a high pace of investment, making RTT a leader in technological and social development by the end of the 1960s.

However, this expansion policy also had a downside. From the late 1960s, debts began to accumulate. The economic crisis gripping the world from 1973 onwards did not help. Furthermore, the company was embroiled in a corruption scandal known as the RTT scandal. The company's financial situation only worsened, and from the mid-seventies, the RTT was forced to cut costs.

Throughout the 1980s, the conviction grew that the telecommunications sector would become one of the key drivers of development in the late twentieth century. Thus, from 1981 onwards, the RTT launched a major reorganisation to solve specific structural issues of the company.

=== From 1987 to 2004: the Belgacom law and sector evolution under the influence of Europe ===
In 1987, another player entered the scene: the European Commission introduced its Green Paper on the development of the common market for telecommunications services and equipment, focusing on market liberalisation. This Green Paper served as the basis for the Belgian Law of 21 March 1991, which established a new type of government-owned company with enhanced autonomy. The Belgian telecommunications sector was reorganized, and in 1992, the RTT was replaced by Belgacom PLC, an autonomous public-sector company. The company and the state entered into a management contract that ensured the provision of certain public services and granted the company more autonomy than was stipulated in the 1930 Act.

From 1994 onwards, European convergence processes were accelerated. The European Commission stated in a new Green Paper that network operation and telephony should also be open to competition. Belgacom PLC evolved into a company limited by shares under public law. On 1 July 1994, Belgacom launched the Proximus mobile network, entrusted to a subsidiary, Belgacom Mobile. Belgacom remained a 75% shareholder, with the remaining 25% owned by Air Touch (which became Vodafone in 1999).

In 1996, the Belgian government sold 50% minus 1 Belgacom share to the ADSB Telecommunications consortium. This consortium consisted of Ameritech (SBC), Tele Danmark, and Singapore Telecom, along with three Belgian financial institutions: Sofina, Dexia, and KBC.

In 1997, Belgacom International Carrier Services (BICS), a carrier and wholesale department, was established. With the complete liberalisation of the telecom market on 1 January 1998, Belgacom acquired Skynet, the first internet access provider in Belgium and one of the largest web portals in the country. Its internet activities were integrated into the Belgacom brand, which launched ADSL in the Belgian market. In 2000, BICS established offices in Asia, Oceania, the Americas, and the Middle East. In 2001, it launched its mobile offering.

In 2001, the BeST plan was introduced to restructure the company by dividing it into four business units. Belgacom also divested certain activities, including Belgacom France, Ben, its security operations, and the French operations of Infosources. The consequences of the BeST plan for the staff became apparent in 2002: many employees were offered options to quit, work part-time, or retrain.

In an increasingly open market where competition was becoming more aggressive, Belgacom decided in 2003 to radically change its image. A new logo, new colours, and a desire to be closer to the customer were intended to bring new momentum. These radical changes in the company's philosophy foreshadowed the operator's initial public offering (IPO). On 22 March 2004, Belgacom was listed on the stock market for the first time. The Belgian government remained the majority shareholder, holding 50% plus 1 of all shares, while the ADSB consortium sold all its shares.

The IPO enabled the Belgian operator to release significant resources to finance its ambitions: offering fixed internet access via broadband or fibre optic (through the Broadway project).

In 2004, the operator conducted the first tests of digital television in a few hundred households, aiming to tap into new revenue streams in a market where competition from triple-play packages (television, telephony, and internet) like IPTV was intensifying.

=== From 2005 to 2009: consolidation, convergence, and the first bundled offers ===
In 2005, Belgacom and Swisscom Fixnet signed an agreement to merge their international carrier activities, consolidating their position in the international market. Belgacom TV was launched in the Belgian market, acquiring broadcasting rights for Belgian football for a three-season period. Belgacom introduced Belgium's first digital TV service via ADSL, expanding its services to include fixed telephony, mobile telephony, high-speed internet, and television. This move aimed to diversify revenue streams amidst declining profit margins in its other activities. Additionally, in 2005, Proximus became the first mobile telephony provider in Belgium to offer 3G services to the public.

In 2006, Belgacom acquired Telindus, enhancing its range of ICT services and network integration solutions tailored for businesses and professionals. Belgacom also completed the acquisition of the remaining 25% stake in Proximus from Vodafone and acquired Euremis, a provider of mobile CRM solutions catering to companies in the fast-moving consumer goods (FMCG) and pharmaceutical sectors. In April 2007, Proximus and Belgacom introduced their initial bundled offerings, referred to as 'packs'. Furthermore, Belgacom focused on advancing its digital television services during this period.

In 2008, Belgacom initiated the acquisitions of Scarlet and Tele2 Luxembourg, and acquired Scarlet NV. In June 2008, the provider also acquired Tango from Tele2, an operator active in Luxembourg and Liechtenstein.

=== From 2010 to 2013: TV Everywhere and the first 4G network ===
In 2010, Belgacom Group completed the full integration of its subsidiaries, including Belgacom Mobile SA/Proximus, Telindus NV, Telindus Sourcing SA, the activities of Belgacom Skynet SA, and the Belgian activities of Telindus Group NV, into Belgacom SA, thereby forming a single legal entity. Partnerships were also signed with Jinni, In3Depth, Blinkx, and OnLive to develop the Belgacom TV entertainment platform further. Additionally, FON, the world's largest Wi-Fi community, became a partner.

After several incidents, CEO Didier Bellens was fired in 2011. Ray Stewart and Stefaan De Clerck were appointed temporary CEOs until a new CEO was found.

In 2011, Belgacom introduced Belgacom TV Everywhere, enabling customers to access Belgacom TV across various devices, including TVs, PCs, tablets, and smartphones, through Wi-Fi and 3G connectivity. Additionally, Belgacom established an exclusive partnership with Deezer to enhance its content library with music streaming services. BICS initiated a roaming hub contract with MTN Group, the largest mobile operator in Africa and the Middle East. Concurrently, Telindus launched the Telindus Telecom brand, focusing on providing connectivity and data centre solutions for the business and professional sectors.

In 2012, Proximus inaugurated Belgium's first 4G network, while Tango did the same in Luxembourg. Belgacom introduced Internet Everywhere, an integrated solution catering to both home and mobile internet needs. Belgacom Group also acquired The Phone House chain of stores that year.

In 2013, Proximus unveiled new mobile pricing plans tailored to different types of phones: Smart for smartphone users and Easy for customers using classic mobile phones. Belgacom acquired significant spectrum in the 800 MHz frequency band to enhance its 4G capabilities. Through Home&Care, the company provided security solutions that enabled customers to monitor their homes via smartphones or tablets remotely. Meanwhile, Scarlet introduced TRIO, a triple-play package combining fixed telephony, broadband internet, and TV services.

In the same year, Belgacom, along with other telecommunications operators and Belgian banks, formed Belgian Mobile Wallet NV, a collaborative initiative aimed at creating a Belgian mobile payment solution named Sixdots. The objective was to promote the use of smartphones for payments instead of traditional bank cards and card readers. Despite efforts, the project faced challenges and was halted in 2015.

=== From 2014 to 2019: Bye-bye Belgacom, hello Proximus ===
On 9 January 2014, Dominique Leroy was appointed as the new CEO and chairwoman of the executive committee of the Proximus Group for a period of 6 years. Leroy focused on enhancing the company's offerings and prioritised growth through her Fit for Growth strategy.

In 2014, it was decided to phase out the Belgacom brand name gradually. Starting in the autumn of 2014, Proximus became the new commercial name for all fixed, mobile, and IT products, while other brands, such as Scarlet, remained intact.

In April 2015, shareholders approved changing the company name from Belgacom to Proximus, effective June 22.

In 2016, Proximus established a unique Smart Mobility company named Be-Mobile. Commercial offerings were revamped with the introduction of new all-inclusive products: Tuttimus for residential customers and Bizz All-in for small businesses. Proximus invested in Citie, an innovative retail platform that supports the local economy and facilitates closer interaction among merchants, shoppers, and local governments. In December 2016, Proximus announced Fibre for Belgium, a €3 billion investment plan aimed at delivering high-speed internet to residents and businesses. Proximus also introduced HD voice calls via 3G and 4G on mobile phones and conducted successful tests for the next-generation mobile networks (4.5G and 5G).

Fibre for Belgium was deployed for the first time in 2017 in seven cities across Belgium. Proximus extended its partnership with Vodafone for Belgium and Luxembourg and acquired Davinci Labs, enhancing its presence in the cybersecurity market. Starting from 12 June 2017, Proximus customers were able to surf, call, and text within the European Union without additional charges. The MyProximus app was launched, and Proximus acquired application developer Unbrace. Additionally, BICS completed the acquisition of Telesign, a US-based communication platform and service company. On 29 December 2017, Proximus discontinued its telegram service after over 150 years.

In 2018, Proximus acquired Umbrio to bolster its position in the expanding IT, network, and analytics market. The Dutch company ION-IP was also acquired to invest in the emerging Benelux Managed Security Market. Proximus successfully completed the acquisition of CODit and secured a commercial Fibre-to-the-Business wholesale deal with telecom operator Destiny. 2018 saw the first successful 5G outdoor trial in Belgium, conducted in collaboration with Huawei, and the launch of the NB-IoT network for connecting digital gas and electricity meters for Fluvius.

Meanwhile, major Belgian banks and mobile operators, including Proximus, introduced Itsme. This digital identification app enables Belgian citizens to log in and verify their identities with government agencies, banks, insurers, and other private companies.

=== From 2019 to the present day: the digital shift ===
In 2019, Proximus unveiled the #shifttodigital strategy, aimed at expediting transformation efforts to ensure the company's continued relevance in the Belgian market and safeguard its future. The strategy encompassed both operational enhancements and a social component, which sparked strikes and protests among some members of the workforce. Following extensive negotiations, an agreement was reached between management and the trade unions, which was subsequently approved by the board of directors.

The brand promise "Think possible" was also launched in 2019, and the digital TV platform Proximus TV was rebranded as Proximus Pickx. Proximus and Orange Belgium collaborated under the name MWingz.

In September 2019, Proximus announced that Dominique Leroy had decided to leave the company on 1 December due to international career plans. CFO Sandrine Dufour temporarily assumed the role of CEO. Guillaume Boutin was appointed as the new CEO on 1 December 2019. He had been with Proximus since August 2017 as Chief Consumer Market Officer.

Together with DPG Media and Rossel, Proximus launched a digital press offering called My e-Press. They entered a partnership with construction firm Besix for smart buildings. The first 5G demonstrations focused on live video streaming, industrial robots, drones, virtual reality, and cloud gaming.

In February 2020, Proximus and the Port of Antwerp signed a Memorandum of Understanding for the project "The Digital Schelde" to prepare the port's digital transformation by developing a private 5G network. In March, CEO Guillaume Boutin presented his new strategy #inspire2022. The long-term plan is based on four strategic pillars: the deployment of fixed and mobile gigabit technologies, the transformation into a digitally native company, the development of partnerships and ecosystems, and a strengthened focus on sustainable and digital business operations.

Simultaneously, the company announced its intention to significantly accelerate the rollout of the fibre optic network through joint venture agreements with EQT and Eurofiber. It was deployed in sixteen cities in December 2020: Aalst, Antwerp, Brussels, Charleroi, Ghent, Hasselt, Kortrijk, Knokke-Heist, Leuven, Liège, Mechelen, Namur, Ostend, Sint-Niklaas, Roeselare, and Vilvoorde.

Proximus launched the first 5G network in Belgium and also introduced "Flex" to the market, a new range of packages. An agreement was reached with Eurofiber and DELTA Fiber to expand and accelerate the rollout of the fibre optic network in Belgium. In June 2020, Proximus entered into a strategic partnership with Belfius to establish a neobank – a fully digital internet bank named Banx. Proximus Codit and Unbrace merged and an agreement was reached with Disney+.

In October 2024, the Proximus Group announced its plan to sell its data centers to Datacenter United for €128 million. This move allows Proximus to focus on its core business operations and strategic initiatives. On March 3, 2025, the acquisition was officially completed, marking a significant milestone in the company's growth. By divesting its data centers, Proximus can now channel its resources towards innovation and enhancing its primary services, ensuring a sharper focus on customer satisfaction and industry leadership.

== Main brands and activities of the group ==
=== Proximus ===
Proximus is the primary brand of the Proximus Group. The current Proximus brand consolidates older brands, including Proximus Mobile (formerly Belgacom Mobile) and Proximus TV (formerly Belgacom TV).

=== Proximus NXT ===
Proximus NXT focuses on fibre and 5G networks within the business world in the Benelux region.

=== Scarlet ===
Scarlet was founded in 1992 in the Netherlands. It is a triple-play telecommunications company.

=== Mobile Vikings ===
In June 2021, Proximus received approval from the Belgian competition authority for the acquisition of Mobile Vikings, which includes the Jim Mobile brand.

=== Proximus Media House (PmH) ===
Proximus Media House is the Proximus Group's partner for editing and broadcasting (live) productions and media activities on every platform. PmH fully manages the digital channels Pickx, Pickx+, Pickx+ Sports, and Pickx Live.

=== Connectimmo ===
Connectimmo is the real estate arm of the Proximus Group. It manages the commercial, financial, legal, and technical aspects of the Proximus Group's real estate portfolio (comprising more than 1000 buildings/sites).

=== Doktr ===
Doktr enables hybrid healthcare through video consultation. The company is supported by Proximus, Solidaris/Socialist Mutualities, and Mutualité Chrétienne/Christian Mutualities.

=== Proximus Ada ===
Proximus Ada is a Belgian centre that combines artificial intelligence and cybersecurity.

=== Ads & Data ===
Ads & Data is a collaboration between Proximus/Skynet, Pebble Media, Telenet/SBS, and Mediahuis.

=== Tango ===
Tango is the brand under which the Proximus Group markets its products and services in Luxembourg. The company specialises in fixed and mobile telephony, internet, and television services for individuals and small businesses with fewer than 10 employees.

=== Telindus ===
Telindus was acquired by Belgacom in 2006. In 2010, Belgacom ceased Telindus' activities as a separate legal entity and incorporated them into Belgacom SA. The Telindus brand name is still used in Luxembourg and the Netherlands.

=== BICS (Belgacom International Carrier Services) ===
BICS (Belgacom International Carrier Services) was founded in 2005 as a joint venture between Belgacom, Swisscom Fixnet and MTN Group.

=== Telesign ===
Telesign is a company that specialises in digital identity services and authentication.

== Group structure ==
As of 2023, the Proximus Group consists of nine separate units: the CEO's department, Consumer Market, Enterprise Market, Corporate Affairs, Network & Wholesale, Customer Operations, Human Capital, Digital & IT, and Finance.

== Financial data ==
Financial data in millions of euros:

Year	2012	2013	2014	2015	2016	2017	2018	2019	2020	2021	2022	2023
Total revenue before non-recurring items	6462	6318	6112	6012	5873	5802	5829	5697	5481	5579	5914	6048
Net income	712	630	654	482	523	522	508	373	564	443	450	357

== Board of Directors ==
Period	Chairman
RTT
1991 - 1992	Benoît Remiche
Belgacom
1992 - 1994	Benoît Remiche
1994 - 2003	Michel Dussenne
2003 - 2004	Jan Coene
2004 - 2013	Theo Dilissen
2013 - 2015	Stefaan De Clerck
Proximus Group
2015–present	Stefaan De Clerck

Period	CEO
RTT
? - 1988	Jozef De Proft
1988 - 1991	Louis Eggermont
1991 - 1992	Bessel Kok
Belgacom
1992 - 1995	Bessel Kok
1995 - 2002	John Goossens
2003 - 2013	Didier Bellens
2013 - 2015	Dominique Leroy
Proximus Group
2015 - 2019	Dominique Leroy
2019–2025	Guillaume Boutin
2025-present	Stijn Bijnens

== GCHQ hack ==
In 2012/2013, the British intelligence agency GCHQ hacked Belgacom. Information leaked by the whistleblower Edward Snowden in 2013 revealed that the British intelligence agency was behind the cyberattack Operation Socialist, which infiltrated the computer network of Belgacom using Regin malware. The hack made the company realise the importance of maintaining a constant focus on cybersecurity. In 2020, Proximus invested 7.5 million euros in its Corporate Cyber Security Program, and in 2022, established Proximus Ada, a new subsidiary dedicated to AI and cybersecurity.

== See also ==
- Belgacom Towers
- European Competitive Telecommunications Association
- John J. Goossens
- Bessel Kok
