= Alexia Guggemos =

French art critic and writer (born 1966)

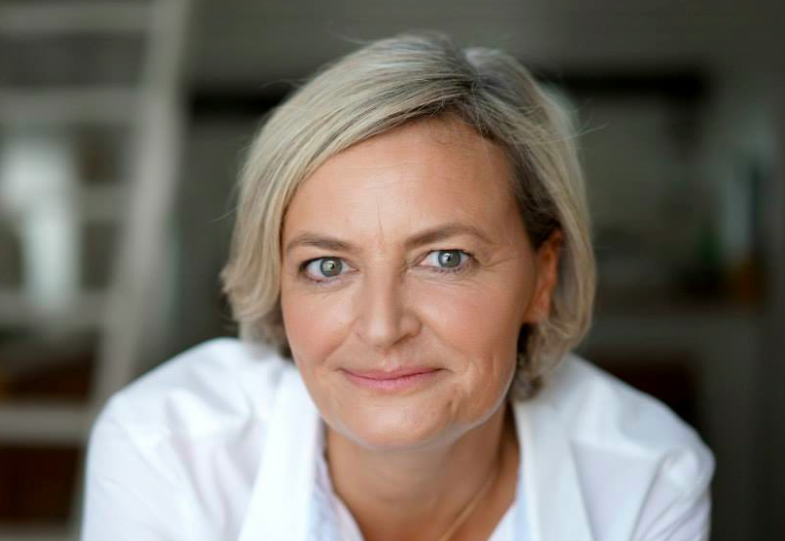
Alexia-guggemos

Alexia Guggémos (August 8, 1966) is a French art critic, curator, writer and digital sociologist. The Art Gorgeous Magazine ranked her in the top 20 most influential women of the French art scene (2019).

She has written for HuffPost, 20 Minutes, and is the founder of UNIK Art Magazine.

She published several books about art, artists, and social media.

== Digital sociologist ==
After the creation of the Grand Prize of e-reputation in 2011 which allowed her to point out France's delay in the use of social media and to bring out the mechanics of marketing for art, Alexia Guggémos founded a monitoring unit called the Social Media Observatory (L'Observatoire Social Media). Each year, it publishes a barometer of the artistic scene in the digital ecosystem.

She leads experiential education actions like the Operation Art Students Week, to encourage art school students to make themselves known on Instagram. She participated in France in the development of Museum Week, the first social media cultural event which in 2019 mobilized six thousand cultural institutions worldwide. In 2019, she published The Digital Survival Guide – Social media for the use of creators at Editions in Fine (Les Echos Group) in which she analyzes the power of social media.

== Art critic and curator ==
After studying at the École du Louvre, directing the literary and artistic magazine Cargo, publishing artists' books, Alexia Guggémos trained in new technologies.

In 1996, she created the Musee du Sourire (Museum of Smile), the first virtual museum dedicated to smile in art, exclusively on the internet and without being housed in a building. Dedicated to contemporary art, its collection is made of around a hundred works by around thirty artists such as, Sabine Weiss, Andres Serrano, Invader. Orders are regularly placed with artists, as with Madame Mo, who created an animation about the smile of Mona Lisa. For the museum's 20th anniversary, artist Christophe Weber has produced an interactive performance based on the paintings of Jean-Honoré Fragonard.

General Delegate of the International Internet Film Festival (1999–2001), she was responsible for the selection of digital creations and led an interactive writing workshop at the Royal Saltworks of Arc-et-Senans. Photographer Mireille Loup created an interactive short film Une femme de 30 ans (2001). She curated exhibitions at Colette, in Paris, and on the Internet for the Opline Prize.

She gives conferences on art and new media and was at the Centre Pompidou, at the Gaîté-Lyrique or at the Cube, the multimedia center of Issy-les-Moulineaux.

Member of the International Association of Art Critics (AICA), she is responsible for the development of digital. Nominated for the 2017 AICA Prize, Alexia Guggémos presented the work of Gilles Barbier. She has participated in several monographs including that of Catherine Ikam, and of the Franco-Haitian painter Hervé Télémaque, with whom she has published a book of interviews, Confidence.

== Writer ==
Alexia Guggemos has written several books on art, artists and social media.

To honor the memory of French poet Boris Vian, the Cohérie Boris Vian entrusted Alexia Guggémos the production of the event book celebrating in 2020 the centenary of the author of L'Écume des jours. Boris Vian 100 ans in collaboration with Nicole Bertolt, representative of the memory of Boris Vian. She received an award for the book.

In 2020, the Magazine Connaissance des Arts created a web-serie about art history based on her book « L’Histoire de l’art pour les nullissimes » (2017) (Art history for dummies).

Books

- Le Manuel de No Big Deal, Interviews with philosophe Fabrice Midal (1999)
- Histoire d'une collection, Éditions du Musée du sourire (2003)
- Les Médias sociaux à l'usage des artistes, Éditions Thémistocle (2011, 2014)
- Génération blogueuses, collective book, Editions du Chêne (2012)
- Confidence – Entretiens avec Hervé Télémaque, Somogy Éditions d'Art (2015)
- Hervé Télémaque, collective book, Editions Flammarion (2015)
- Catherine Ikam, monographie, Éditions du Centre des arts numériques d'Enghien-les-Bains (2016)
- L'Histoire de l'art pour les nullissimes, Editis (2017)
- Le Guide de Survie digitale – Les réseaux sociaux à l'usage des créateurs, In Fine Editions d'art, Les Échos (2019)
- Boris Vian 100 ans, Hérédium (2020)
- Rares Sourires Enquête dans les musées du monde (2025)

== Awards and distinctions ==
2020 : Prize of Jazz Book for her book Boris Vian 100 ans

The Art Gorgeous Magazine ranked her in the top 20 most influential women of the French art scene (2019)
