= BICS (company) =

Belgian telecom company

- Industry: Telecommunications
- Founded: 1997
- Headquarters: Brussels, Belgium
- Key people: Matteo Gatta (CEO until 02/2024)
- Website: bics.com

BICS is active in digital communications, cloud communication services, mobility and IoT for telecom players, virtual network operators, service providers, enterprise software providers and global enterprises. It is a subsidiary of Proximus Group. The company was founded in 1997 and is headquartered in Brussels, Belgium with sales offices and Service Operation Centers worldwide, including Dubai, Singapore, Bern, San Francisco and New York. BICS provides services across more than 200 countries, carries around 50% of the world's data roaming traffic and partners with more than 500 mobile operators. In 2021 BICS carried over 20.8 billion minutes of international traffic and generated revenues for 999 million Euros.

== History ==
- 1997, Belgacom created its International carrier Services business unit. Later, in the early years 2000, the Belgacom Group deliberately separated the financial reporting of its International Carrier Services to increase financial transparency and accountability.
- January 2005, the international carrier activities were transferred into a wholly owned subsidiary: BICS SA (Belgacom International Carrier Services SA).
- July 2005, Belgacom SA and Swisscom agreed to consolidate their international carrier businesses into a joint venture company, Belgacom International Carrier Services SA (BICS). In this JV Belgacom spun off all the existing international telecommunications carrier services activities and related assets previously run within the Belgacom Carrier & Wholesales business unit. As a result of this transaction, Swisscom and Belgacom assumed joint control over Belgacom International Carrier Services SA (BICS) with respectively 72% and 28% shares.
- June 2009, BICS announced an agreement with South Africa's MTN Group to combine international carrier services. Under the terms of the deal MTN took an equity stake in BICS in return for merging the assets of its own international wholesale subsidiary MTN ICS. BICS operated as MTN's official international gateway for carrier services globally. Post implementation of the transaction, BICS' shares distribution becomes the following: Belgacom own 57.6% of BICS, Swisscom 22.4% and MTN 20.0%.
- October 2017, BICS announced it had completed the acquisition of US-based CPaaS provider, TeleSign.
- January 2021, BICS announced the appointment of Matteo Gatta as CEO of the Group
- February 2021, Proximus acquired full ownership of BICS, buying out MTN and Swisscom's shares in the company.
- June 2021, BICS launches 5G test lab environment
- December 2021, BICS acquires CPaaS specialist 3M Digital Networks, also known as MobTexting

== BICS' coverage ==
BICS owns and operates a high capacity MPLS enabled global network based on a wholly owned and operated 100 Gbit/s capable DWDM network in the Netherlands, France, Germany, Italy, Switzerland, Luxembourg, UK and Belgium augmented with leased capacity and submarine cable assets to serve the global footprint.

BICS' international network includes over 700 direct connections in 180+ countries, capacity on 75 submarine cables (including the TAT-14, SMW3, FLAG, Yellow/AC-2 and SAT-3/WASC) with 200 landing points, participation in the Intelsat and Eutelsat satellite systems, and over 300 bilateral agreements with other operators. To secure capacity between Europe and Asia for future requirements.

To add physical redundancy, in 2008 BICS invested in the EIG (Europe India Gateway) cable system through their partner Omantel. BICS fully own Teleport in La Ciotat with a large allowed Leased Spectrum (76°5E to 31°5W).

For mobile data, BICS operates its own signalling, SMS, MMS and GRX platforms, which connect up to 400 mobile networks across the globe. Peering connections have been established with over 30 hubbing providers to extend the company reach to the overall mobile community.

== Products and technologies ==
BICS routes voice and data communications across the different networks on an international scale. The voice and mobile data products and services are part of the Mosaic product portfolio. The company is evangelist of developments in new telecommunication technologies as 4G, IP, Wi-Fi, etc. In the first half of 2013 BICS announced the performance of the first intercontinental 4G roaming connection over its IPX platform, between Europe and Asia. BICS historically started off as a voice-only provider, but began to diversify its offering with mobile oriented solutions in the early years 2000.

In 2019, BICS launched the first 5G intercontinental roaming service and enabled Europe's first 5G roaming service.

In 2022, BICS launched its Communications Platform-as-a-Service (CPaaS) Platform.
