= Zelyony =

Zelyony (alternatively Zelyoniy or Zelyonyy) may refer to:

- Zelyony (surname)
- Zelyony, Bashkortostan, a village in Bashkortostan, Russia
- Zelyony Island (Rostov-on-Don), an island in the Don near Rostov-on-Don, Russia
- Zelyony Island (Kuril Islands), an island in the Kuril Island chain

== See also ==
- Zeleny
