= Zelyony Island =

Zelyony Island (Russian: Зелёный Остров, romanized: Zelyony Ostrov) may refer to:

- Zelyony Island (Kuril Islands), an uninhabited island in the Kuril Island chain, Sakhalin Oblast, Russia
- Zelyony Island (Rostov-on-Don), river island situated in the lower reaches of the Don River, Rostov Oblast, Russia

== See also ==
- Zelyony Ostrov, a village in Astrakhan Oblast, Russia
