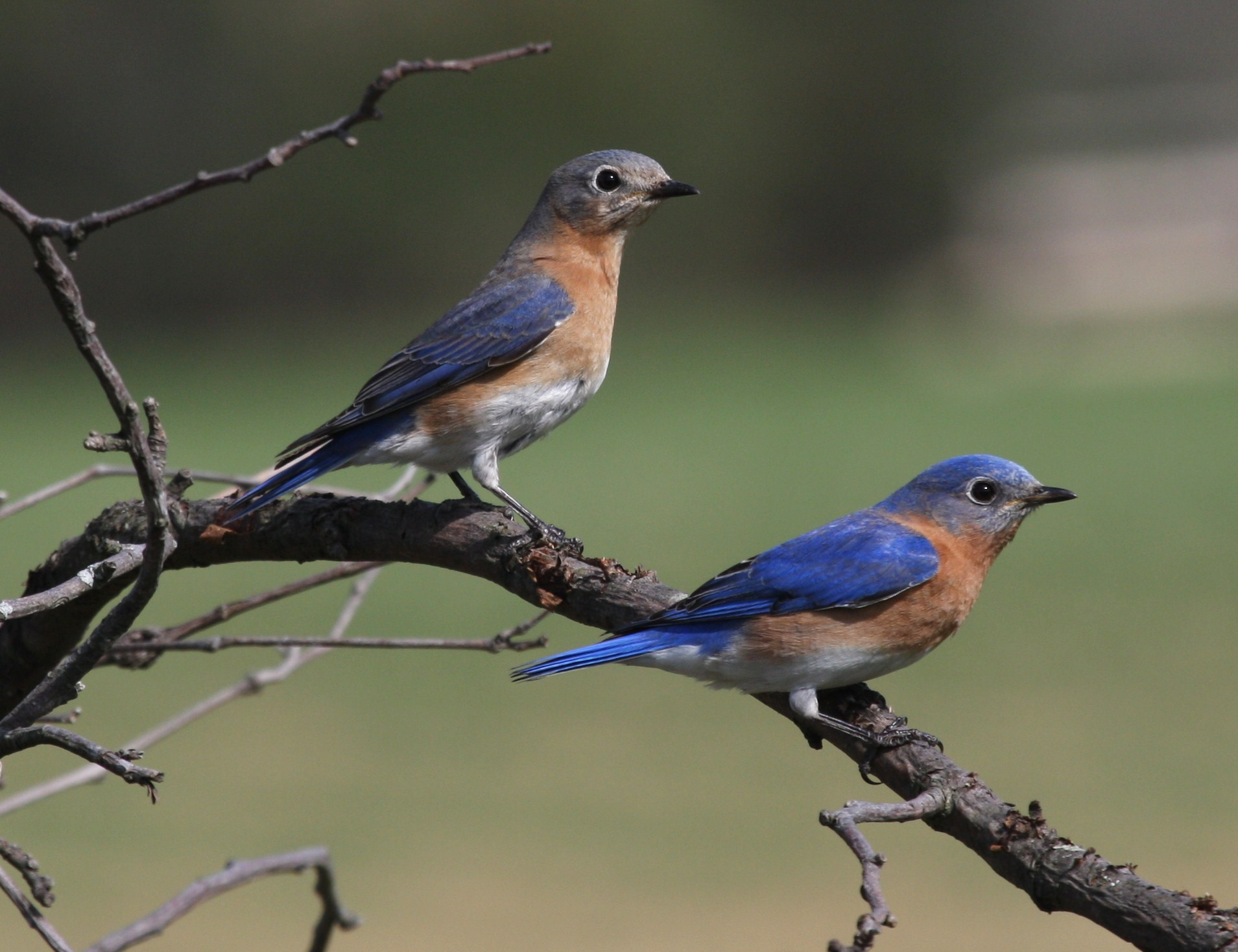
- Female (left) and male (right) in Michigan

Conservation status
- Least Concern (IUCN 3.1)

Scientific classification
- Kingdom: Animalia
- Phylum: Chordata
- Class: Aves
- Order: Passeriformes
- Family: Turdidae
- Genus: Sialia
- Species: S. sialis

Binomial name
- Sialia sialis (Linnaeus, 1758)
- Geographic distribution of S. sialis Breeding range Year-round range Wintering range

Synonyms
- Motacilla sialis Linnaeus, 1758

= Eastern bluebird =

Eastern bluebird Temporal range: Late Pleistocene–present

Species of bird

The eastern bluebird (Sialia sialis) is a small North American migratory thrush found in open woodlands, farmlands, and orchards.

The bright-blue breeding plumage of the male, easily observed on a wire or open perch, makes this species a favorite of birders. The male's call includes sometimes soft warbles of jeew or chir-wi, or the melodious song chiti WEEW wewidoo. It is the state bird of Missouri and New York.

== Taxonomy ==
The eastern bluebird was formally described by the Swedish naturalist Carl Linnaeus in 1758 in the tenth edition of his Systema Naturae under the binomial name Motacilla sialis. The type location is South Carolina. Linnaeus based his short Latin description on the earlier more detailed descriptions by the English naturalists Mark Catesby and George Edwards. The eastern bluebird is now placed in the genus Sialia that was introduced by the English naturalist William Swainson in 1827 with the eastern bluebird as the type species.

Seven subspecies are recognized:

- S. s. sialis (Linnaeus, 1758) – south, southeast Canada, east, central US and northeast Mexico
- S. s. bermudensis Verrill, AH, 1901 – Bermuda
- S. s. nidificans Phillips, AR, 1991 – east central Mexico
- S. s. fulva Brewster, 1885 – southwest US to central Mexico
- S. s. guatemalae Ridgway, 1882 – southeast Mexico and Guatemala
- S. s. meridionalis Dickey & Van Rossem, 1930 – El Salvador, Honduras and north Nicaragua
- S. s. caribaea Howell, TR, 1965 – east Honduras and northeast Nicaragua

== Description ==
Eastern bluebirds measure 16–21 cm (6.3–8.3 in) long, span 25–32 cm (9.8–12.6 in) across the wings, and weigh 27–34 g (0.95–1.20 oz).

Male bluebirds have a bright head, back, and wings. Their breast is a brownish red. Females are lighter with gray on the head and back and some blue on their wings and tail. In females, the breast is usually lighter in color than in males, and is more orange.

== Distribution and habitat ==
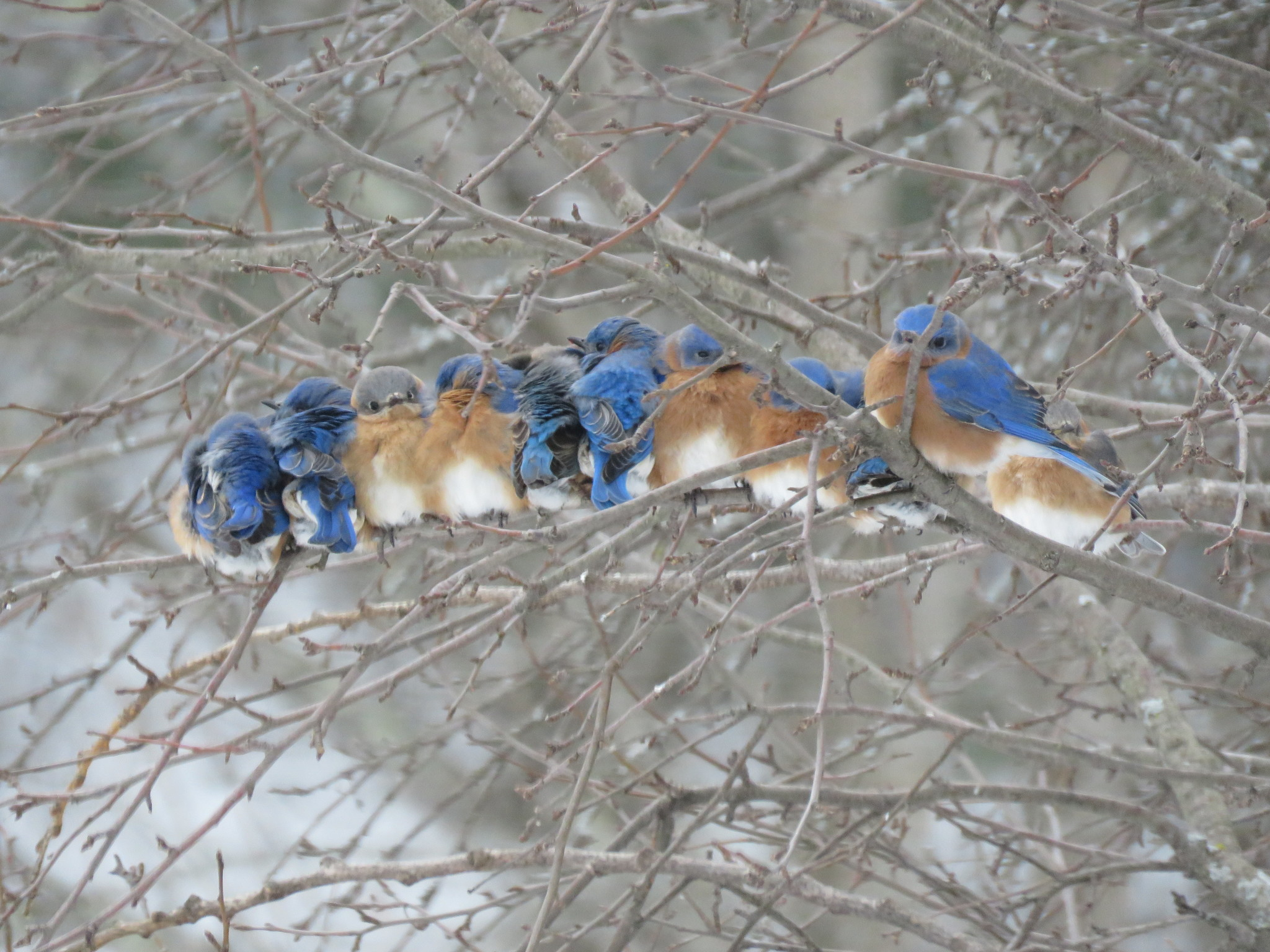
S. s. sialis, Vermont

The eastern bluebird is found east of the Rockies, southern Canada to the Gulf states, and southeastern Arizona to Nicaragua. The increase in trees throughout the Great Plains during the past century due to fire suppression and tree planting facilitated the western range expansion of the species. as well as range expansions of many other species of birds. From 1966–2015 the eastern bluebird experienced a greater than 1.5% annual population increase throughout most of its breeding and year-round ranges, with exceptions including southern Florida and the Ohio River valley.

Bluebirds tend to live in open country around trees, but with little understory and sparse ground cover. Original habitats probably included open, frequently burned pine savannas, beaver ponds, mature but open woods, and forest openings. Today, they are most common along pastures, agricultural fields, suburban parks, backyards, and even golf courses. Populations also occur across eastern North America and south as far as Nicaragua. Birds that live farther north and in the west of the range tend to lay more eggs than eastern and southern birds.

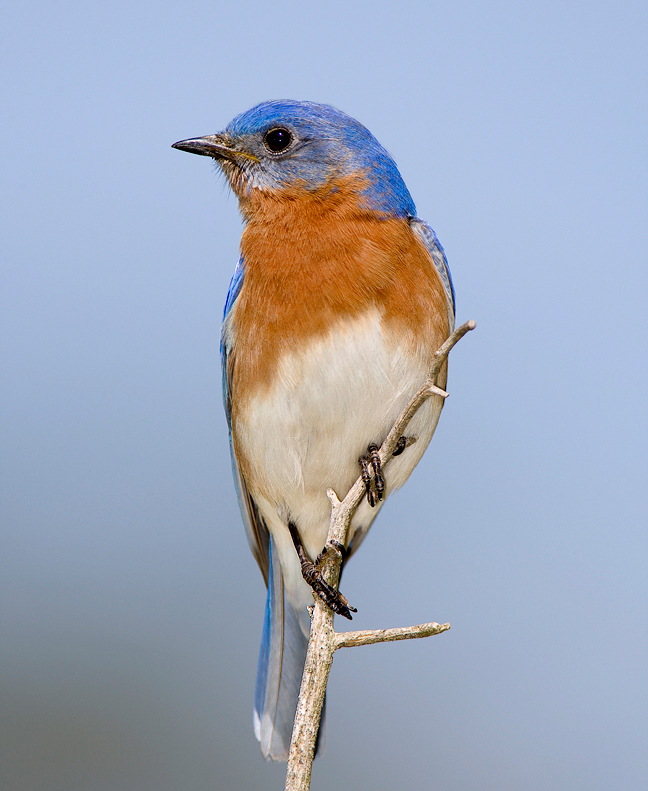
Male

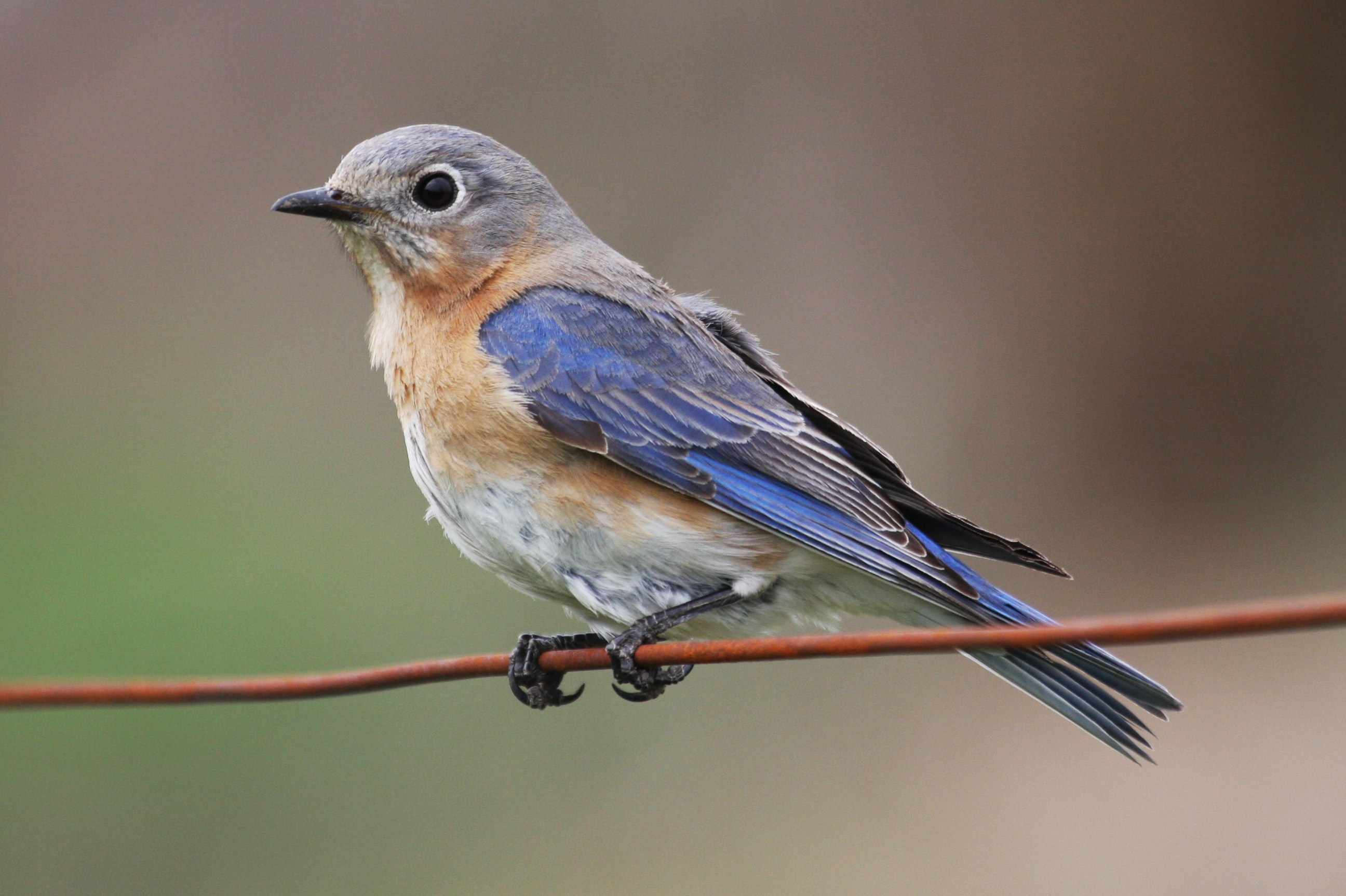
Female

An isolated, insular subspecies of the eastern bluebird is found on Bermuda, and has a distinctive, brighter blue coloration compared to mainland populations. This population was formerly thought to have predated the colonization of the islands (making it one of only three extant, resident pre-colonization Bermuda landbirds, alongside the Bermuda white-eyed vireo and gray catbird). However, analysis of fossil strata found no evidence for the existence of bluebirds on the islands prior to European colonization. Using simulations and molecular evidence, a 2013 study found that the Bermuda bluebirds likely descend from very small founder population from a single colonization event during the 1600s. This colonization event could either be a natural one by migratory individuals or an anthropogenic introduction by early settlers, who are known to have introduced several other eastern North American birds like the northern cardinal (Cardinalis cardinalis) to Bermuda very shortly after colonization. It is likely that the alteration to the islands' ecosystem due to the clearing of native forest facilitated this colonization by providing optimal bluebird feeding habitat, along with a lack of predators.

== Behavior and ecology ==
Eastern bluebirds are social, and will sometimes gather in flocks of over a hundred. However, they are territorial during the breeding season and may continue to defend a feeding area throughout the winter.

Eastern bluebird
Calls and songs of the eastern bluebird

=== Breeding ===
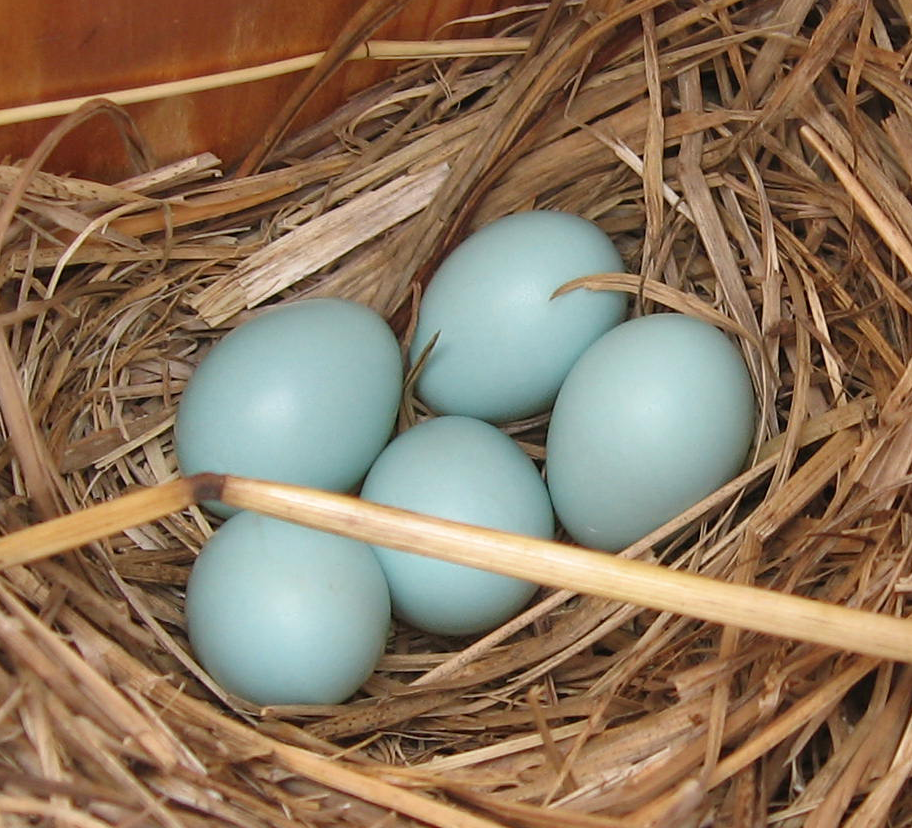
Eggs

Mating occurs in the spring and summer. A mature female typically raises two broods each season. Nests are constructed in trees within abandoned woodpecker holes or other cavities that provide adequate protection (usually several feet above ground). Construction of the nest is done primarily by the female and takes around 10 days to complete. These nests are small, cup-like structures lined with grass, feathers, stems, and hairs. Each female lays three to seven light-blue or, rarely, white eggs. The female incubates the eggs, which hatch after 13 to 16 days. The young cannot care for themselves upon hatching. The female broods the chicks for up to seven days after hatching. Fledglings then leave the nest 15 to 20 days after hatching.

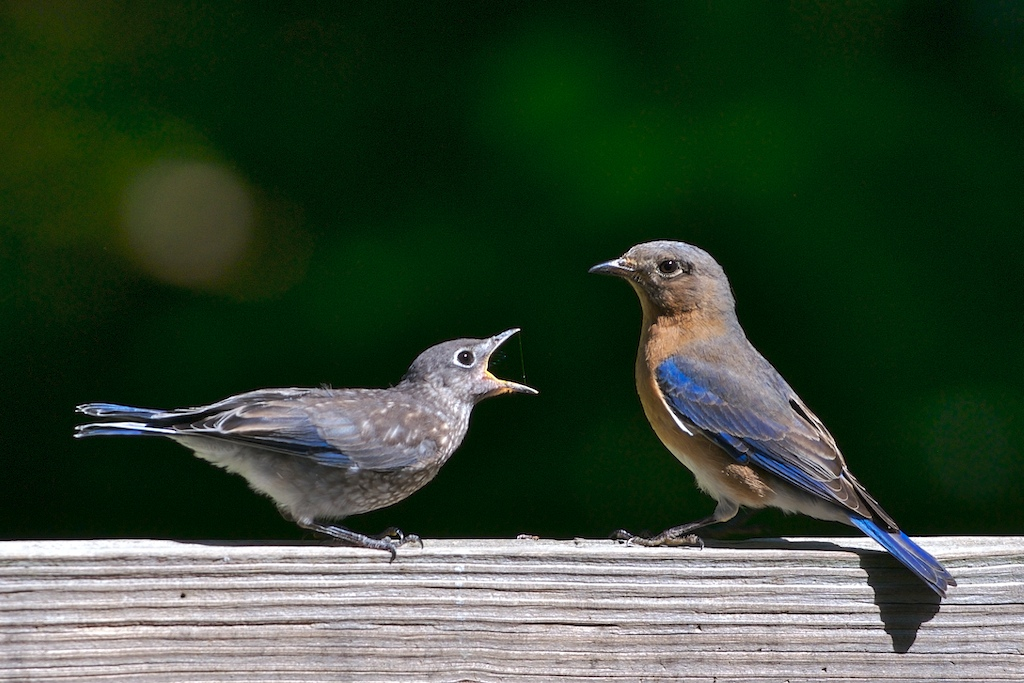
Juvenile (left) with parent

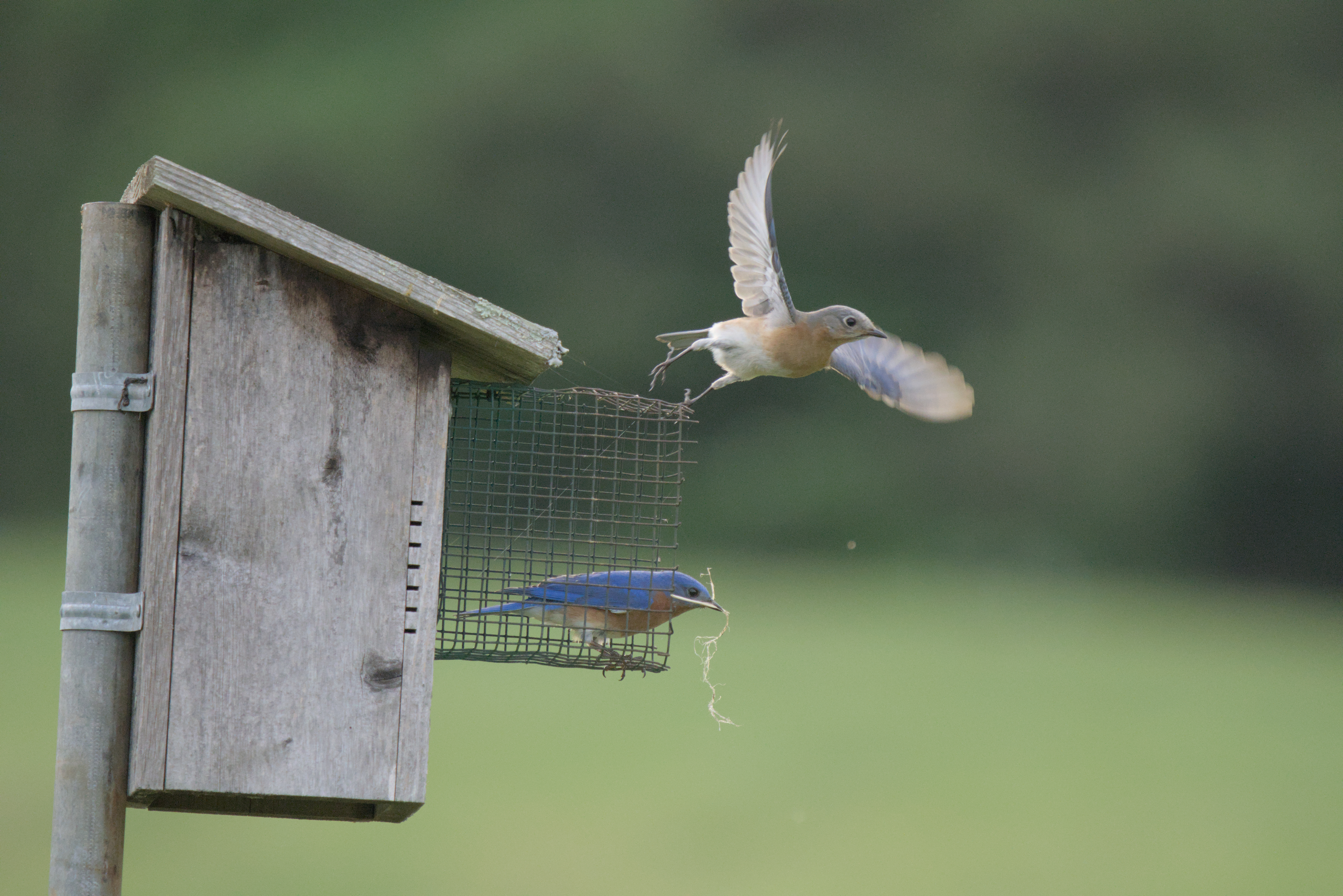
Male and female eastern bluebirds at a nesting box

Eastern bluebird in Quebec, Canada

Both parents cooperate in raising the young, which they feed a diet consisting almost entirely of insects. Some young stay around the nest to help raise another brood. Fledglings are grayish in color, with speckled breasts. The blue color becomes much more prominent and the speckles on their breasts disappear as they mature. Bluebirds may begin breeding the summer after they are hatched.

Eastern bluebirds can live for 6 to 10 years. The longest recorded lifespan for a bluebird is 10 years and five months. However, most bluebirds die within their first year of life. Starvation and freezing are a danger to the young, but most threats come from other animals, including humans. Natural predators of eggs and nestlings can include eastern chipmunks, flying squirrels, American black bears, fire ants, and raccoons. Bluebirds of all ages (including adults) are threatened by rat snakes, Eastern racers, American kestrels, and domestic cats. Introduced species such as European starlings and house sparrows are competitors for nesting sites. Non-nesting adults face predation by all native species of falcons, owls, and most varieties of hawks, particularly those in the genus Accipiter. When approached by a predator, the male makes a song-like warning cry. If no male is present, a threatened female will begin to sing, hoping to attract a protective male back to the territory. Both males and females also flick their wings and warble when predators are nearby.

=== Food and feeding ===
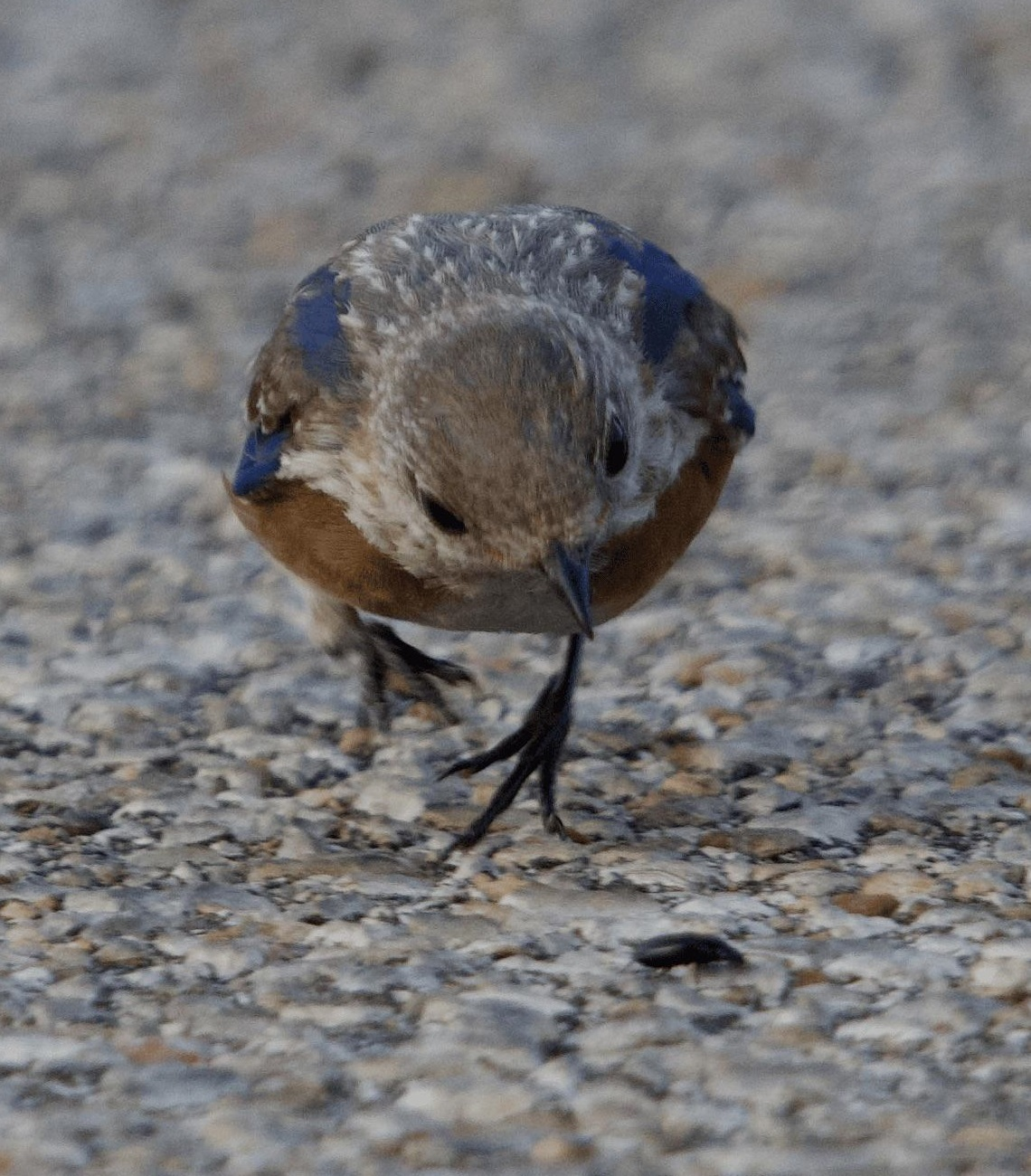
Eastern bluebirds often perch on fenceposts, where they wait to hawk insects from the ground. Beetles are a staple for juveniles during warmer months.

About two thirds of an adult bluebird's diet consists of insects and other invertebrates. The remainder is made up of wild fruits or berries. It has a preference for grasshoppers, crickets, katydids, and beetles; and will also eat earthworms, spiders, millipedes, centipedes, sowbugs, and snails.

Bluebirds feed by perching on a high point, such as a branch or fence post, and swooping down to catch insects on or near the ground. The availability of a winter food source will often determine whether or not a bird will migrate. If bluebirds do remain in a region for the winter, they group and seek cover in heavy thickets, orchards, or other areas in which adequate food and cover resources are available.

== Conservation ==
Eastern bluebirds thrived in the 1700s and 1800s. This flourishing is thought to be connected with the activity of settlers. Clearing forests made new habitat available for bluebirds and nesting sites were created in the increasing numbers of apple orchards and in wooden fence posts that eventually rotted. It is believed that bluebirds were most abundant around 1900. Throughout the early to mid-20th century, bluebird populations suffered a major decline. The main drivers of this decline were changes in land use, clearing land for agricultural purposes, expansion of human settlements, and resources. This involved intensive logging and the destruction of their habitat and clearing dead trees, which interfered with the bird's breeding habits. DDT also contributed to the decline via contaminated insects in the bluebird's diet, which led to eggs with weakened shells that could break during incubation.

Some organisations have attributed the decline of bluebirds due to competition with introduced house sparrows and European starlings mainly owing to their aggressive nesting habits. However this might be unlikely as the population of bluebirds both reach its peak in the early 20th and recovered in the late 20th century when house sparrows and starlings had already been abundant throughout the bluebird’s range for decades. A definite drop has been shown to have occurred between 1938 and the late 1970s.

Conservation efforts are seen as early as 1934 when Thomas Musselman created the first bluebird trail by setting up rows of bluebird houses along roads. Also in the 1930s, William Duncan created a bluebird house design and educated others about these birds. In 1964, The National Association for Protection and Propagation of the Purple Martin and Bluebirds of America was founded. After it went out of existence, the Nature Society kept up with conservation work. Lawrence Zeleny's 1976 book, The Bluebird: How You Can Help Its Fight For Survival, and a National Geographic article he wrote helped make the plight of these birds well known. In 1978, Zeleny founded the North American Bluebird Society.

If the Bermuda population of bluebirds is considered the product of natural colonization, it has also become highly endangered. Early settlers described individual flocks numbering over 50 birds each flying across the islands, but in the present only 500 individuals are thought to remain. The near-extinction of Bermuda cedar (Juniperus bermudiana) forest in the 1940s and 1950s wiped out the majority of natural nesting habitat for bluebirds, leaving it almost completely dependent on artificial nest boxes for breeding. Introduced starlings and house sparrows evict bluebirds from their nests, and introduced great kiskadees (Pitangus sulphuratus) feed on juvenile birds. They are also threatened by feral cats and pesticides.

== In culture ==
In traditional Haudenosaunee cosmology, the call of the bluebird (Note: Oneida: talolóhaˀ; Onondaga: jyęhyogeih; Cayuga: jǫ́:nyǫ:ˀ; Seneca: ji:nyóae’) is believed to ward off the icy power of Sawiskera, also referred to as Flint, the spirit of the winter. Its call caused Sawiskera to flee in fear and the ice to recede.

Bluebirds were popular with early American colonists and associated with the coming of spring. They were referred to as the 'blue robin' because of their resemblance to the European robin. Bluebirds have been mentioned in the works of many writers including Thoreau's writings, Robert Frost's "The Last Word of a Bluebird (as told to a child)", the "Over the Rainbow" song from The Wizard of Oz, the song "Zip-A-Dee-Doo-Dah" ("Mister Bluebird's on my shoulder") from Disney's Song of the South, and John Burrough's "The Bluebird". Lawrence Zeleny said that bluebirds represent joy to Americans.

The eastern bluebird is featured prominently on the current obverse of the Bermudian $2 bill.

== Gallery ==
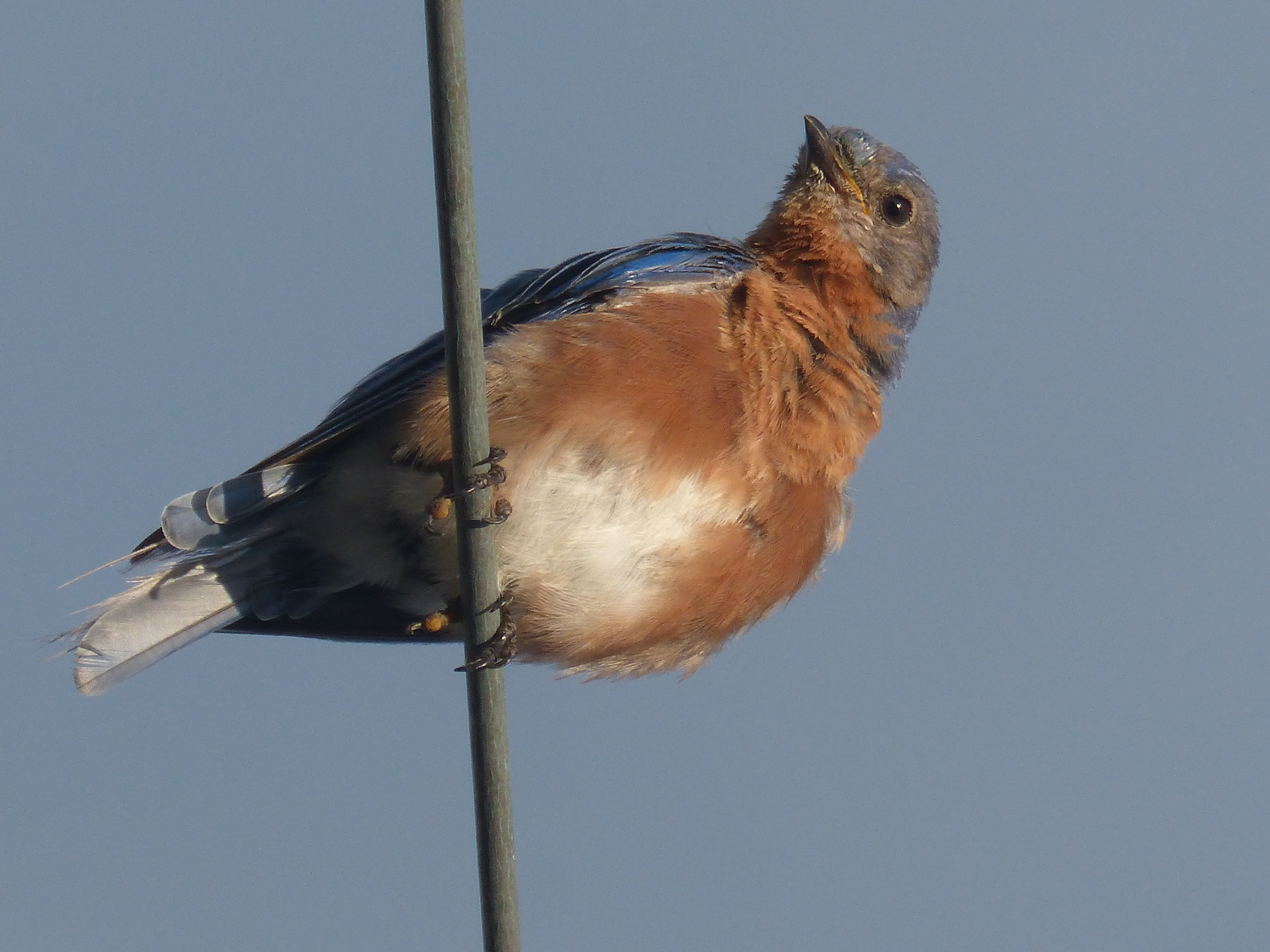
Young eastern bluebird (Sialia sialis bermudensis) in Bermuda, seen from below

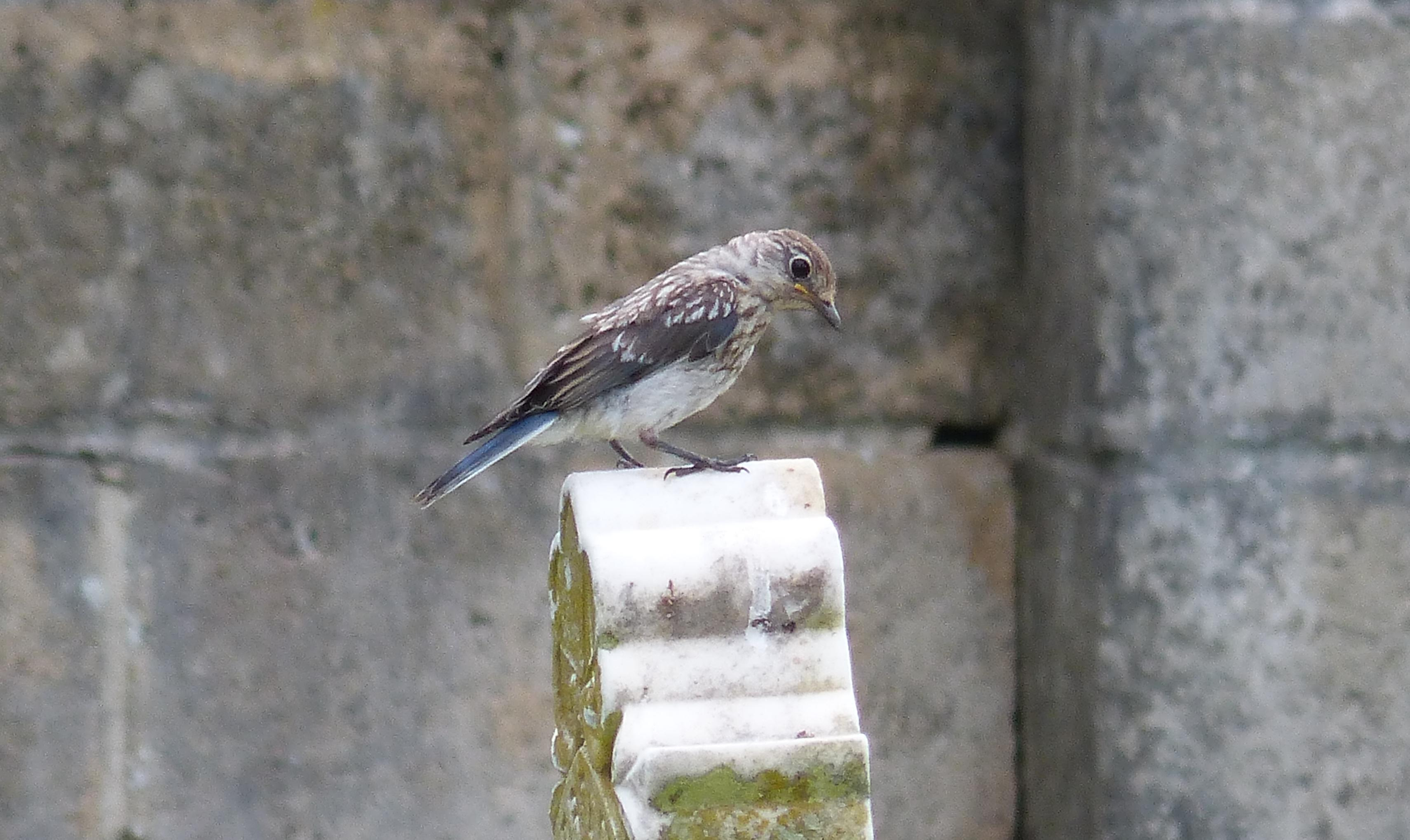
Juvenile eastern bluebird (Sialia sialis bermudensis) at Prospect Camp Protestant Cemetery, in Devonshire Parish in the British Overseas Territory of Bermuda

== See also ==
- Bluebird of happiness
