= Zelyony (surname) =

Zelyony, feminine: Zelyonaya Russian: Зелёный, Зелёная, meaning "green", is a Russian surname. It may be transliterated as Zeliony. Russian words often printed without diacritics over ё and may be occasionally transliterated as "Zeleny". Notable people with this surname include:

- Georgii Zeliony (1878–1951), Russian physiologist
- Lev Zelyony (born 1948), Soviet and Russian physicist
- Rina Zelyonaya (1901–1991), Soviet actress
- Vsevolod Zelyony, native name of Vsevolods Zeļonijs, Latvian judoka

== See also ==
- Zeleny, an equivalent surname in some other Slavic languages
- Zelenoy
