= Zeleny =

Zeleny or Zelenyi (in Czech: Zelený or Ukrainian: Зелений, meaning "green") is a surname. The feminine form is Zelena (in Czech: Zelená). The Russian-language equivalent is Zelyony, sometimes transliterated as Zeliony. Notable people with this surname include:

== People ==
- Charles Zeleny (1878–1939), American zoologist and professor
- Charlie Zeleny, American metal rock drummer
- Daniell Zeleny (born 1988), Australian footballer
- Jaroslav Zelený (born 1992), Czech footballer
- Jeff Zeleny (born 1973), American journalist
- John Zeleny (1872–1951), Czech-American physicist
- Jindřich Zelený (1922–1997), Czech philosopher
- Josef Zelený (1824–1886), Moravian artist
- Lawrence Zeleny (1904–1995), American biochemist and ornithologist
- Lev Zeleny (born 1948), Russian physicist
- Milan Zeleny (1942–2023), American economist
- Sylvia Aguilar Zéleny (born 1973), Mexican novelist
- Václav Zelený (1936–2020), Czech botanist

== See also ==
- Danylo Ilkovych Terpylo, Ukrainian warlord and pogromist, known as Zelenyy.
