= Kobyakovo Settlement =

Archaeological site in Russia

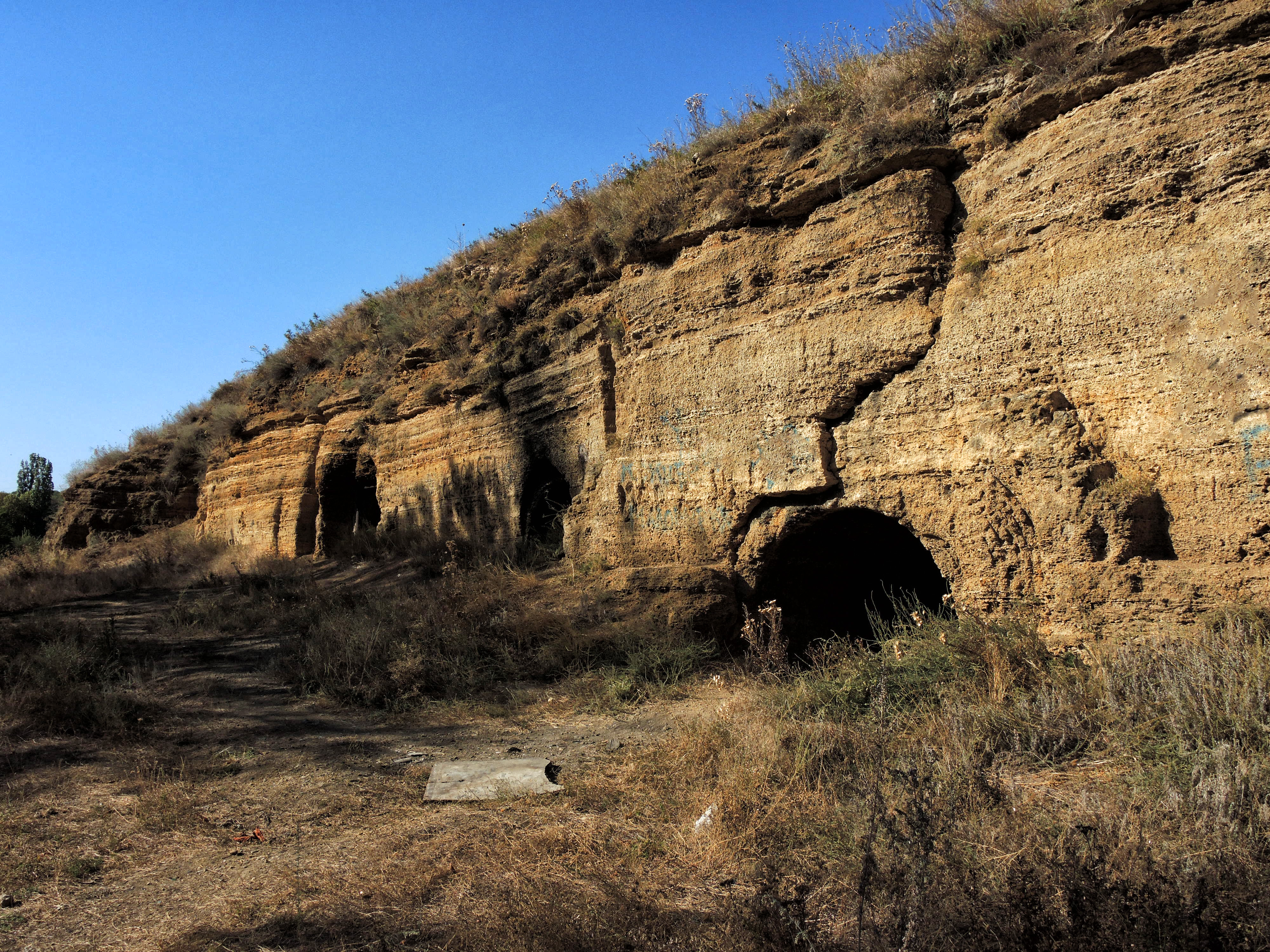
- Interactive map of Kobyakovo Settlement
- 47°14′47″N 39°51′04″E
- Type: settlement
- Region: Rostov Oblast, Russia

Site notes
- Excavation dates: since 1824

The Kobyakovo Settlement (Russian: Кобяково городище) is an archaeological site situated in Rostov Oblast, Russia between the cities of Rostov-on-Don and Aksai.

== History and description ==
Some direct or indirect connections between Kobyakovo Settlement and Tanais had existed since the time of Ancient Rome and the Bosporan Kingdom (which was from 63 BC a dependency of Rome). Historical literature suggests that the Kuban Maeotians tribes migrated to the Lower Don land on the orders of the king of Bosporus. Their resettlement was gradual. First, in the surroundings of Tanais there appeared Podazovskoye and Krepostnoe settlements. A little later – the Nizhne-Gnilovskoye Settlement, and only after it – the Kobyakovo Settlement.

Archaeologist Sergey Makhankov presumes the existence close relations between Tanais and the mechatian fortifications of Roman times (among them Kobyakovo fortified settlement), secondly, gives their inhabitants a common name "tanaites", thirdly, calls them residents of "ancient Rostov", fourthly, suggests 23 AD (the earliest and the date fixed by a reliable epigraphic monument, when the "Tanaits" are mentioned) the starting point of the two thousand-year history of Rostov-on-Don. Such a historical concept, although controversial, received attention from other historians.

It is believed that Kobyakovo ancient settlement was the residence of the Polovtsian khans and named after the Polovtsian Khan Kobyak.

For the first time the phrase "Kobyakovo hillfort" is found in a letter of 7 July 1570, written by Ambassador Ivan Novoseltsev to Tsar Ivan the Terrible. Presumably, near the former Kobyakov settlement in the first half of the 16th century and even the entire 17th century there was a Cossack camp situated close to the border of Ottoman lands.

As a historical and geographical site, Kobyakovo ancient settlement has no unambiguous borders.

Kobyakovo hillfort includes a hill on the banks of the Don River. The fortified settlement became the site of the first archaeological expedition in the South of Russia in 1824. The first settlements existed here in the 10th–8th centuries BC. Notable archaeological finds date from the 1st to 3rd centuries AD. At the present time Kobyakovo hillfort contains visible remains of structures and traces of excavations.

== Literature ==
- БСЭ, 1938 г., Том 33.
- В. Гладченко, И. Капустин. Историческая справка// Аксайский район. Топографическая карта, масштаб 1:100000, Аксай. План-схема, масштаб 1:15000. Карта составлена и подготовлена к изданию ФГУП «11 ВКЧ» в 1998 году, обновлена в 2005 году.
- Евграф Савельев. Археологические очерки Дона. (Лекции по краеведению). Выпуск IІI-й.
- М. И. Артамонов. Средневековые поселения на Нижнем Дону. По материалам Северо-Кавказской экспедиции. ОГИЗ, Государственное социально-экономическое издательство, Ленинградское отделение, 1935 год.
- Ю. Б. Потапова. Кобяково городище — уникальный памятник археологии Аксайского района.
- С. Маханьков. В 2023 году Ростов вправе отмечать свой двухтысячный день рождения!//Вечерний Ростов. 2012. 27 января. С4.
- Спасем Ливенцовскую крепость. Судьба Ливенцовки
