= Zelyony Island (Rostov-on-Don) =

Island in the River Don, Russia

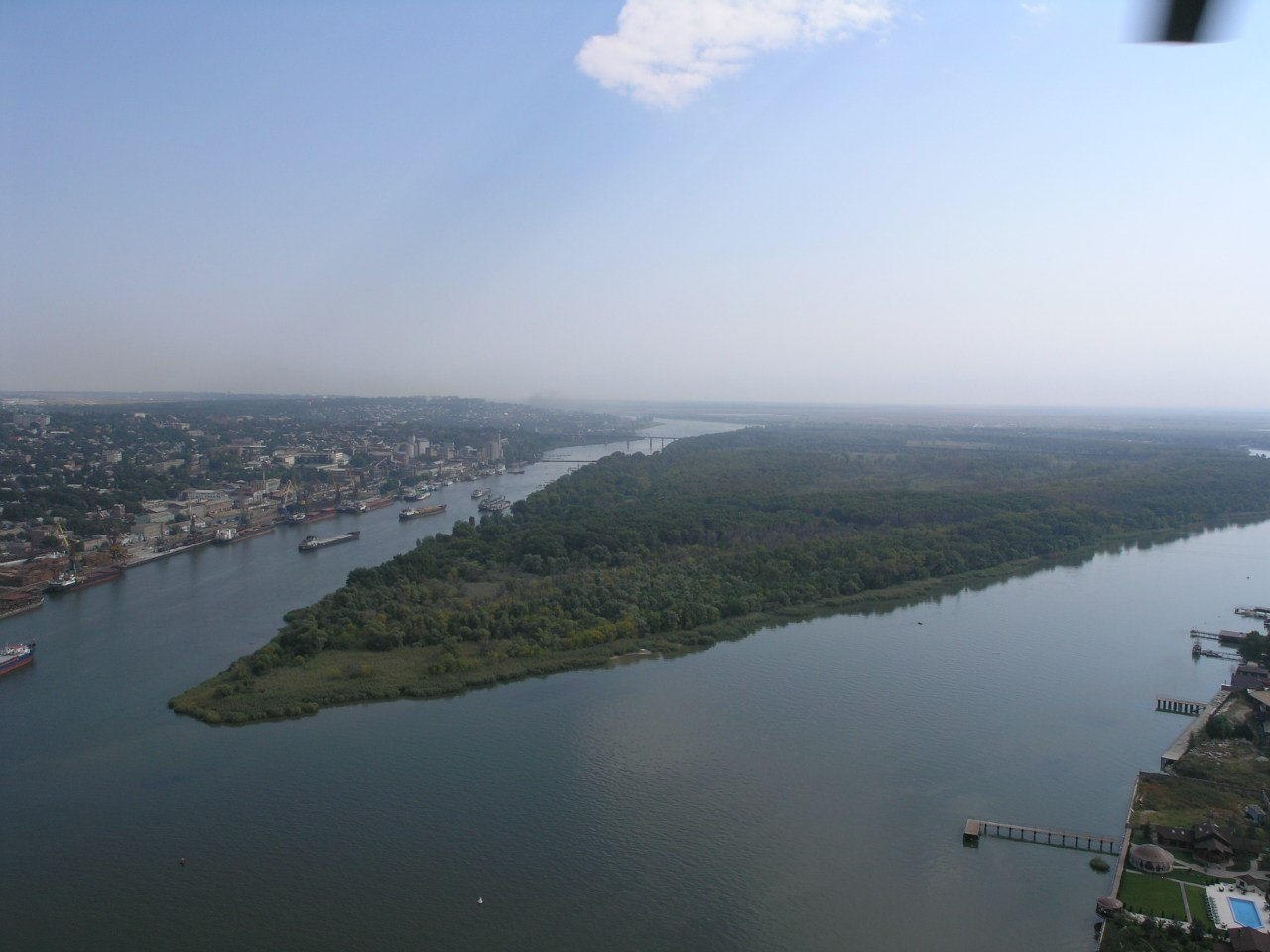
- Interactive map of Zelyony Island

Geography
- Location: Rostov-on-Don, Don River
- Coordinates: 47°07′30″N 39°27′13″E

Administration
- Russia

The Zelyony Island (Green Island in English; Russian: Зелёный остров) is a river island situated in the lower reaches of the Don River, Rostov Oblast, Russia. It has the length of 4 km (from west to east), and the maximum width of 1.5 km. It is a part of Proletarian City District of Rostov-on-Don. From the south it is connected to the main channel of the Don, from the north - to the Nakhichevan channel, to the north of which there is an urban development. In the neighborhood with the Zelyony Island there is one more island - Bystry, which is much smaller in size.

== Description ==
The island is covered with wood and meadow vegetation. Poplar, ash and blackberries are habitat there. The beaches are mostly sandy, overgrown with sedge. There is also a public beach with amenities, recreation centers, children's camps.

The island from north to south is crossed by a single-track electrified railway line Razvilka-Bataisk. The line crosses the Nakhchivan channel and the Don along two railway bridges.

Through the Nakhichevan channel leads a pontoon bridge that provides access to the island. At the entrance to the bridge there is a barrier, but for pedestrians and cyclists access is unrestricted.

In ancient times on the island there were seasonal fishermen's camps. They belonged to the nearby Kobyakovo Settlement.

Gallery

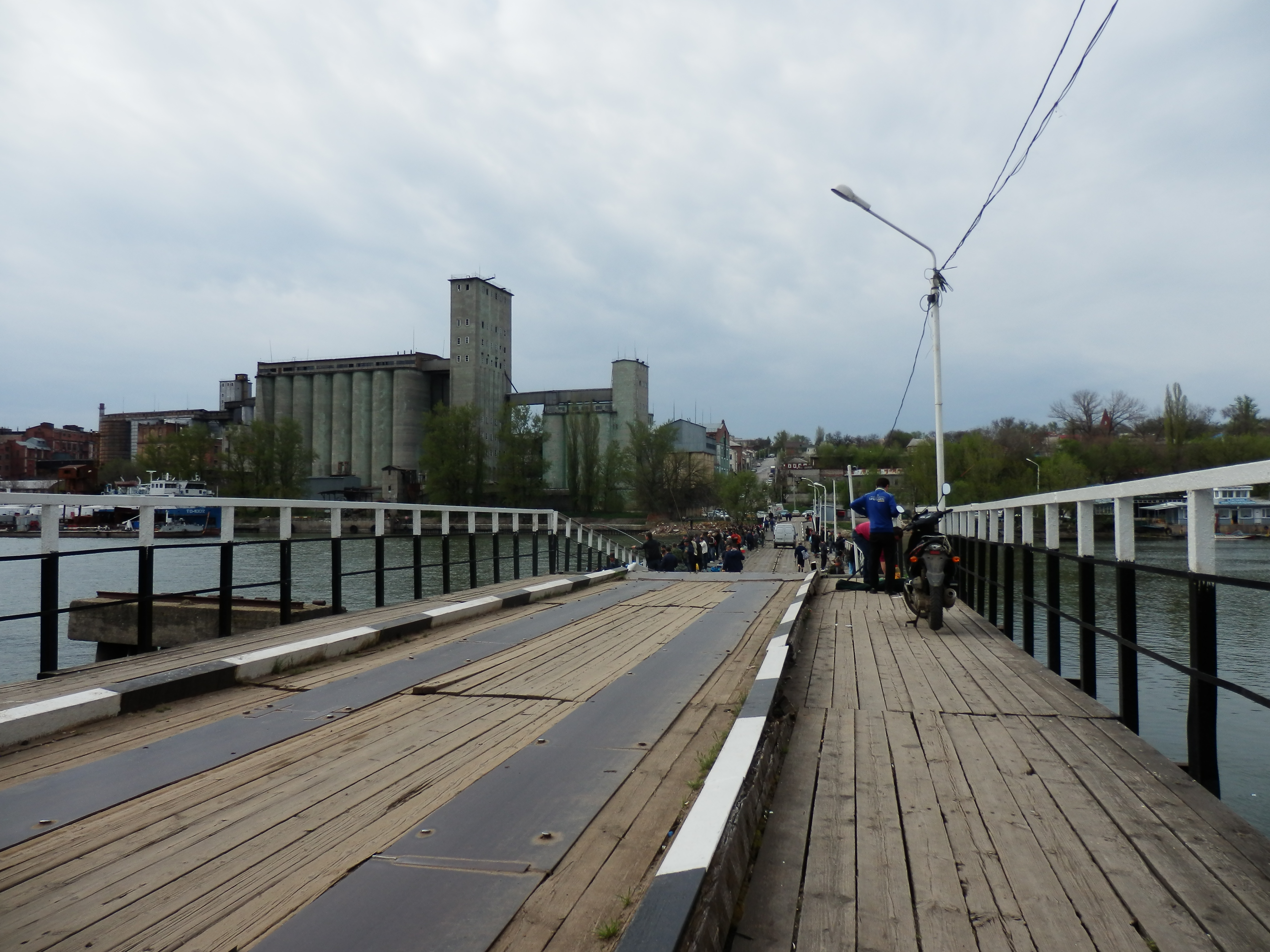
The pontoon bridge

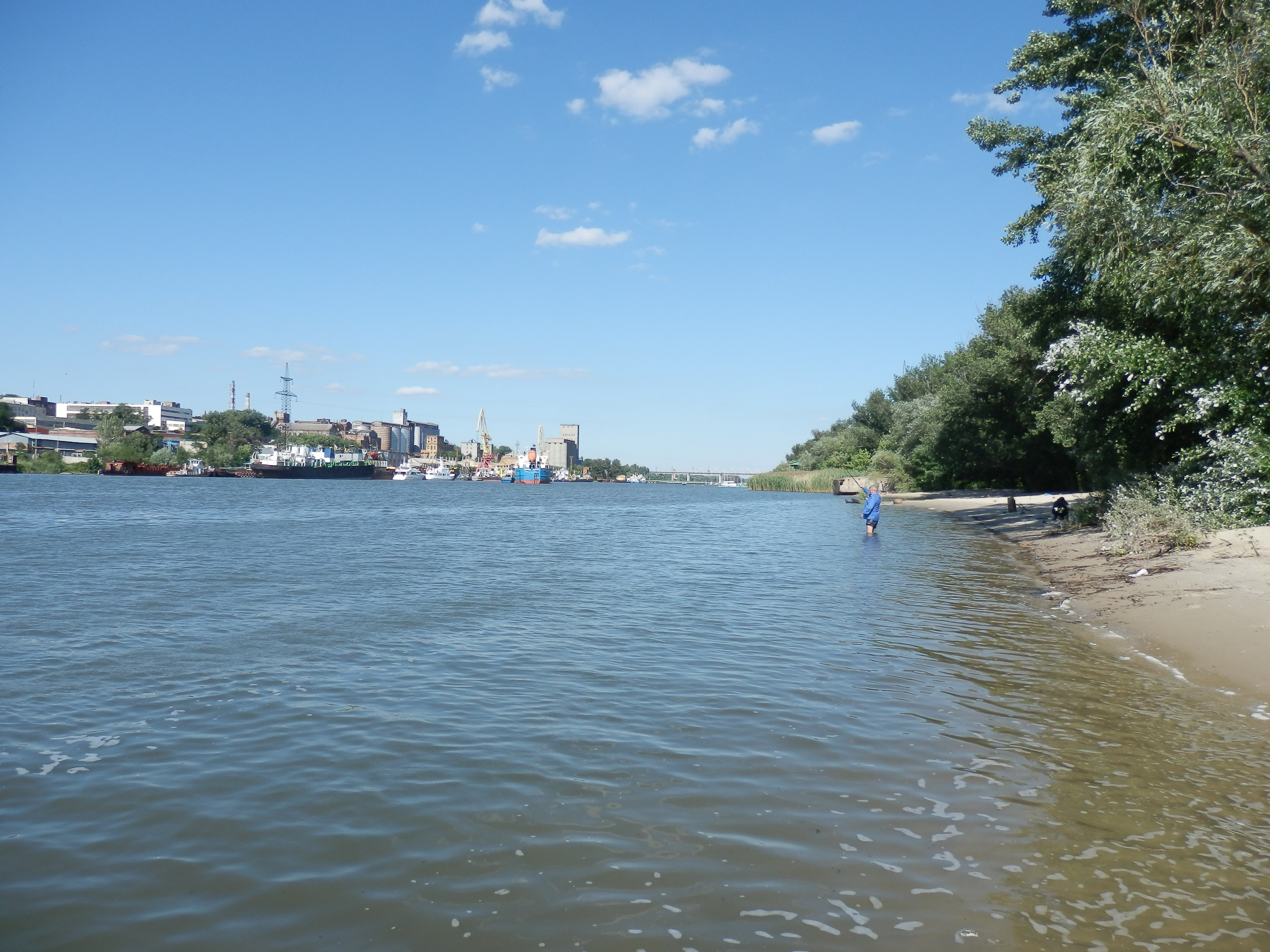
A sandy beach at the western part of the island

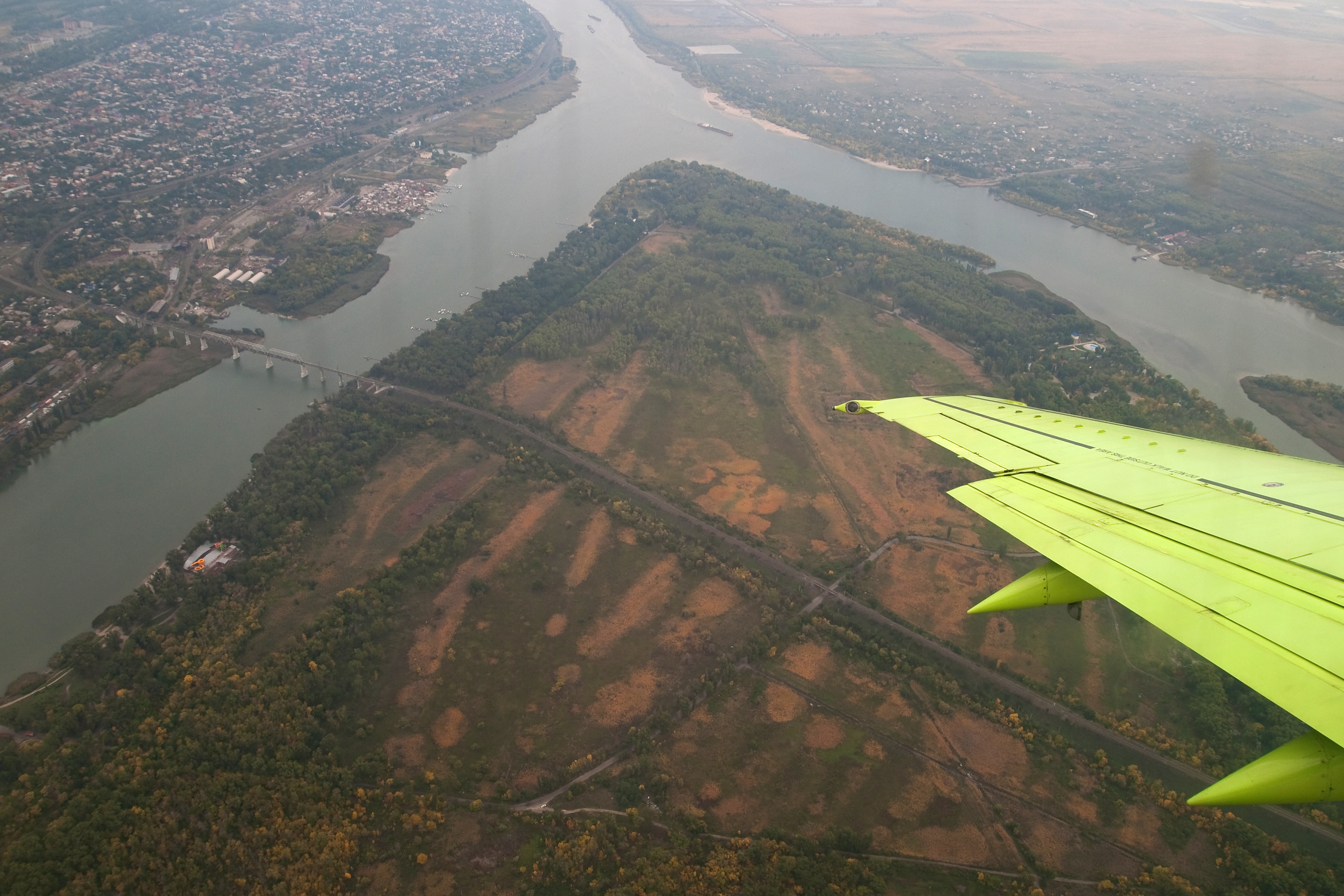
Terrain at the centre of the island, aerial view
