= Zelyony, Bashkortostan =

Zelyony Зелёный
- Village
- Location within Bashkortostan Location within Russia
- Coordinates: 55°28′N 55°39′E
- Country: Russia
- Region: Bashkortostan
- District: Birsky District
- Time zone: UTC+5:00

Zelyony (Russian: Зелёный) is a rural locality (a village) in Burnovsky Selsoviet, Birsky District, Bashkortostan, Russia. The population was 278 as of 2010. There are 3 streets.

== Geography ==
Zelyony is located 18 km northeast of Birsk (the district's administrative centre) by road. Yangitau and Bazhenovo are the nearest rural localities.
