= Zelenoy =

Zelenoy is a Russian surname belonging to the Russian noble Zelenoy family traced from late 15th century. The word is an archaic version of the word "Zelyony" literally meaning "green". Notable people with this surname include:

- Alexander Zelenoy, Russian and Soviet naval commander
- Pavel Zelenoy, Russian admiral
