= Zelyony Ostrov =

Zelyony Ostrov Зелёный Остров
- Settlement
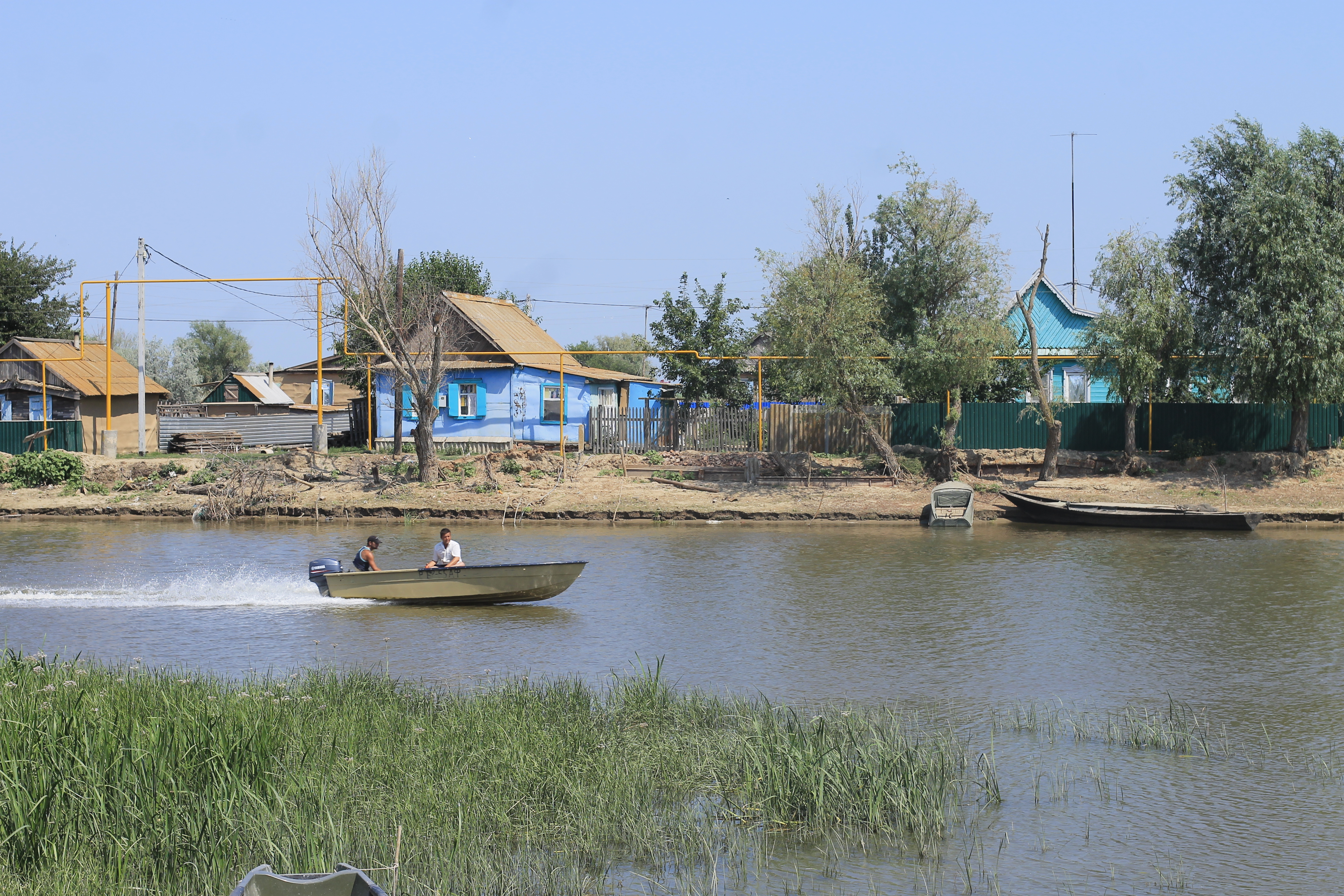

- Location within Astrakhan Oblast Location within Russia
- Coordinates: 46°11′N 48°43′E
- Country: Russia
- Region: Astrakhan Oblast
- District: Volodarsky District
- Time zone: UTC+4:00

Zelyony Ostrov (Russian: Зелёный Остров) is a rural locality (a settlement) in Tsvetnovsky Selsoviet of Volodarsky District, Astrakhan Oblast, Russia. The population was 171 as of 2010. There are 3 streets.

== Geography ==
Zelyony Ostrov is located 32 km (20 mi) southeast of Volodarsky (the district's administrative centre) by road. Tsvetnoye is the nearest rural locality.
