= Lawrence Zeleny =

American biochemist

- Born: April 30, 1904; Minneapolis, Minnesota
- Died: May 27, 1995 (aged 91); University Park, Maryland
- Education: University of Minnesota (B.S. Chemistry - 1925); University of Minnesota (M.S. Chemistry - 1927)
- Alma mater: University of Minnesota (Ph.D. Biochemistry - 1930)
- Known for: Founding North American Bluebird Society
- Spouse: Olive Lowen
- Scientific career
- Fields: Biochemistry
- Workplaces: U.S. Department of Agriculture

Lawrence Zeleny (April 30, 1904 — May 27, 1995) was an American biochemist most notable for his founding of the North American Bluebird Society in 1978. During his 30-year career with the U.S. Department of Agriculture, he noticed a decline in the numbers of bluebirds. After his retirement in 1965, he began a decades-long crusade to save the bird.

== Biography ==
Zeleny was born on April 30, 1904, in Minneapolis, Minnesota, the younger of two sons of Anthony and Mattie Zeleny. For his elementary education, he attended the Motley School in Minneapolis, where he served as a "policeman" as a ten-year old, shepherding the younger students across the street at a dangerous intersection. After graduating high school at the age of 17, he entered the University of Minnesota, where he graduated in 1925 with a B.S. in chemistry. He continued at the university, receiving an M.S. in chemistry in 1927, and a Ph.D. in biochemistry in 1930. While at university he met his future wife, Olive Lowen, and the two were married on June 19, 1930, shortly after Zeleny completed his doctorate.

In 1935, Zeleny accepted a position as a biochemist with the USDA, and the couple moved to the Washington, D.C., area, settling in University Park, Maryland. He held several positions within the agency until his promotion to Branch Chief of the Grain Division in 1943, a position he held until he retired in 1966. While at the Department, he developed a method for testing the baking strength of wheat, which became known as the "Zeleny Test".

== Work with bluebirds ==
As a youth growing up in Minnesota, Zeleny became interested in birds, especially Bluebirds. Even before entering high school in the late 1910s, Zeleny was building bluebird nesting boxes, utilizing a design put out by the Department of Agriculture. He claimed that one of his first memories was that of bluebirds playing in a bird bath when he was fourteen months old. His mother used to walk his stroller every day, parking it next to the bird bath. He furthered his interest in ornithology through a relationship he developed with Professor Thomas S. Roberts while at the University of Minnesota. Roberts had written Water birds of Minnesota in 1919, and would later write the Birds of Minnesota, a two-volume illustrated set documenting the flying fauna of Minnesota. While at the Department of Agriculture, he noticed a decline in the number of bluebirds on the grounds of the Beltsville Agricultural Research Center, during the 1950s, after the arrival of starlings, non-natives to the area. In 1955 he built his first nesting box on the grounds, right outside his office.

After his retirement in 1966, Zeleny received permission from his former boss, the center's director, to establish a bluebird trail on the center's grounds. In 1967, he began the trail with the placement of 13 nesting boxes in time for the breeding season. Over time the trail grew to over 10 miles and 60 nesting boxes. The nesting boxes were of his own design, although with input from others such as T. E. Musselman. Zeleny felt the key to the design was the size of the entrance hole, which had to be an inch and a half in diameter, which would allow bluebirds to enter, but preclude the entrance of starlings. In 1968 he authored a booklet on bluebird preservation entitled Bluebirds for Posterity. In 1969 and 1970 he spoke in numerous locations, promoting bluebird protection. This was in addition to placing hundreds of nesting boxes in Maryland and Virginia, as well as numerous bluebird trails.

Zeleny's concern can be summed up in a letter he wrote to the editor of The Capitol newspaper, in Arlington, Maryland:

The eastern bluebird, one of our finest and most useful songbirds, is in deep trouble almost everywhere. Formerly one of Maryland's more common birds, the bluebird has disappeared in recent years to such an extent that without help its very survival may be at stake. ... the bluebirds are unable to compete with the starlings and house sparrows that were originally brought into the United States from Europe and have now overrun the country in huge numbers. ... The only practical solution to this problem is to supply the blue-birds with large numbers of starling-proof nesting houses ...

By the early 1970s Zeleny was considered to be one of the country's leading experts on bluebirds. In 1971, as president of the Maryland Ornithological Society, he implemented a program in Maryland whereby any homeowner could register their property as a wildlife sanctuary, which would protect native fauna from hunting. In 1976 he published his first book on the plight of the bluebird, The Bluebird: How You Can Help Its Fight for Survival. Dedicated to his wife, Olive, all the proceeds of the book were donated to the North American Bluebird Society. Zeleny's public profile was greatly enhanced with the publication of his article, "Song of Hope for the Bluebirds", in the June 1977 issue of National Geographic. That same year National Geographic credited Zeleny with being the major reason for the turn-around of the bluebird species, which had been on the verge of extinction. He was responsible thousands of miles of bluebird trails in the United States and Canada.

In 1978 he founded, and became the first president of, the North American Bluebird Society (NABS). By 1990 the organization had grown to more than 5000 members.

== Death and legacy ==
Zeleny died on May 27, 1995. NABS has awarded more than $100,000 in research grants on studies of cavity-nesting birds. As of 2012, the Zeleny Endowment Fund had exceeded $100,000. Zeleny's bluebird nesting box design is still used throughout the country. Today, he is still credited with the rebound of the North American bluebird population, as well as being the founding father of the "nest box movement".

== Offices held ==
- President, Maryland Ornithological Society
- Board of Directors, Audubon Naturalist Society
