= 1922 =

1922 in various calendars
- Gregorian calendar: 1922; MCMXXII
- Ab urbe condita: 2675
- Armenian calendar: 1371; ԹՎ ՌՅՀԱ
- Assyrian calendar: 6672
- Baháʼí calendar: 78–79
- Balinese saka calendar: 1843–1844
- Bengali calendar: 1328–1329
- Berber calendar: 2872
- British Regnal year: 12 Geo. 5 – 13 Geo. 5
- Buddhist calendar: 2466
- Burmese calendar: 1284
- Byzantine calendar: 7430–7431
- Chinese calendar: 辛酉年 (Metal Rooster); 4619 or 4412 — to — 壬戌年 (Water Dog); 4620 or 4413
- Coptic calendar: 1638–1639
- Discordian calendar: 3088
- Ethiopian calendar: 1914–1915
- Hebrew calendar: 5682–5683
- Hindu calendars
- Vikram Samvat: 1978–1979
- Shaka Samvat: 1843–1844
- Kali Yuga: 5022–5023
- Holocene calendar: 11922
- Igbo calendar: 922–923
- Iranian calendar: 1300–1301
- Islamic calendar: 1340–1341
- Japanese calendar: Taishō 11 (大正１１年)
- Javanese calendar: 1852–1853
- Juche calendar: 11
- Julian calendar: Gregorian minus 13 days
- Korean calendar: 4255
- Minguo calendar: ROC 11 民國11年
- Nanakshahi calendar: 454
- Thai solar calendar: 2464–2465
- Tibetan calendar: ལྕགས་མོ་བྱ་ལོ་ (female Iron-Bird); 2048 or 1667 or 895 — to — ཆུ་ཕོ་ཁྱི་ལོ་ (male Water-Dog); 2049 or 1668 or 896

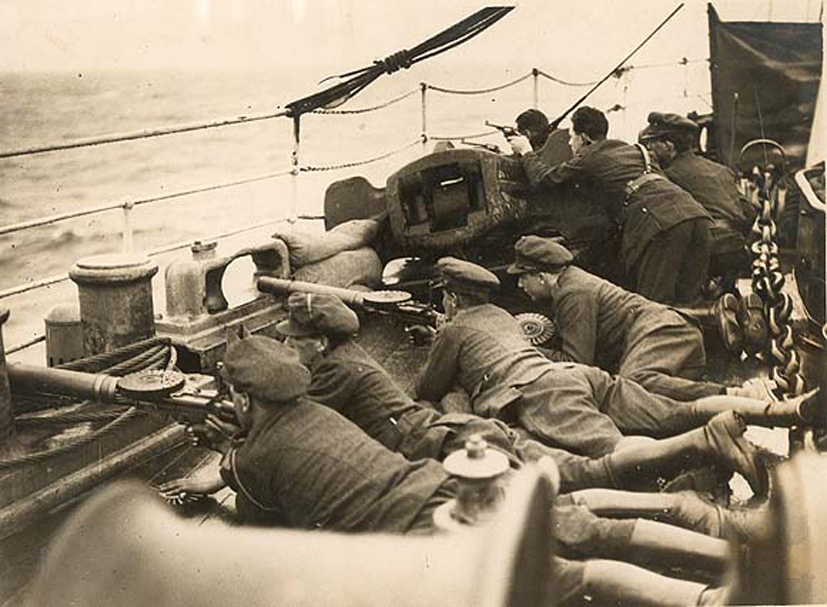
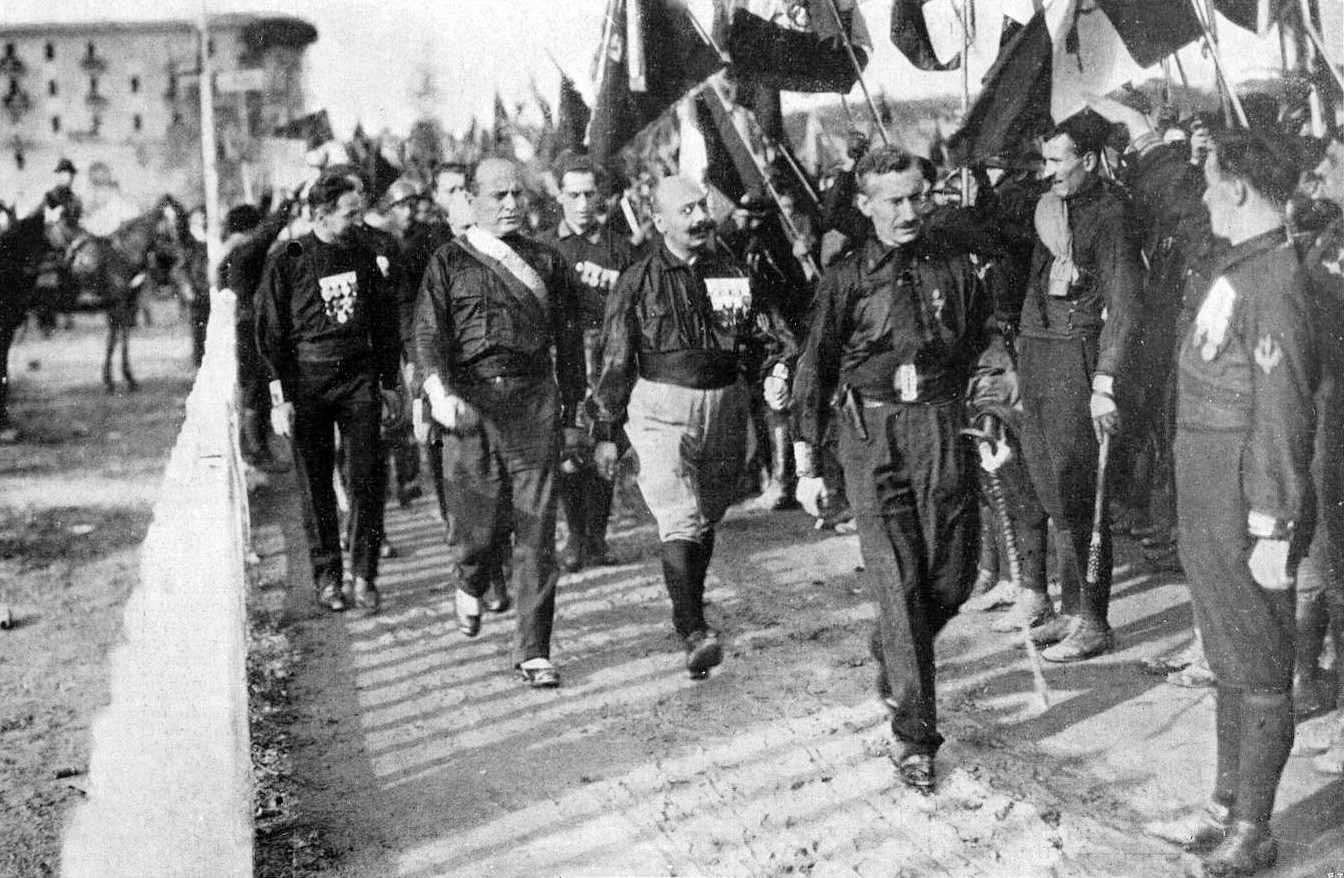
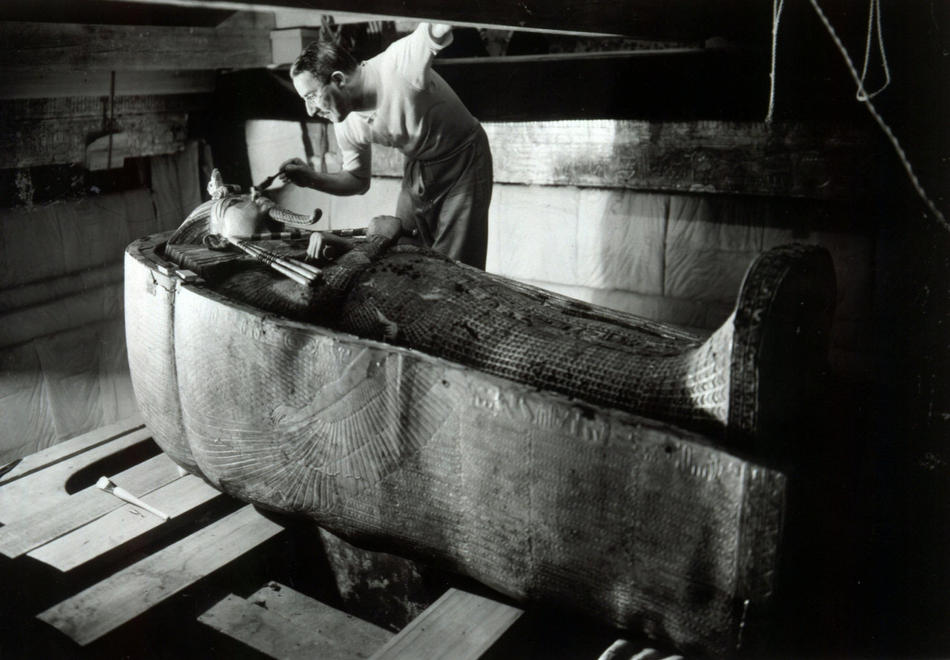
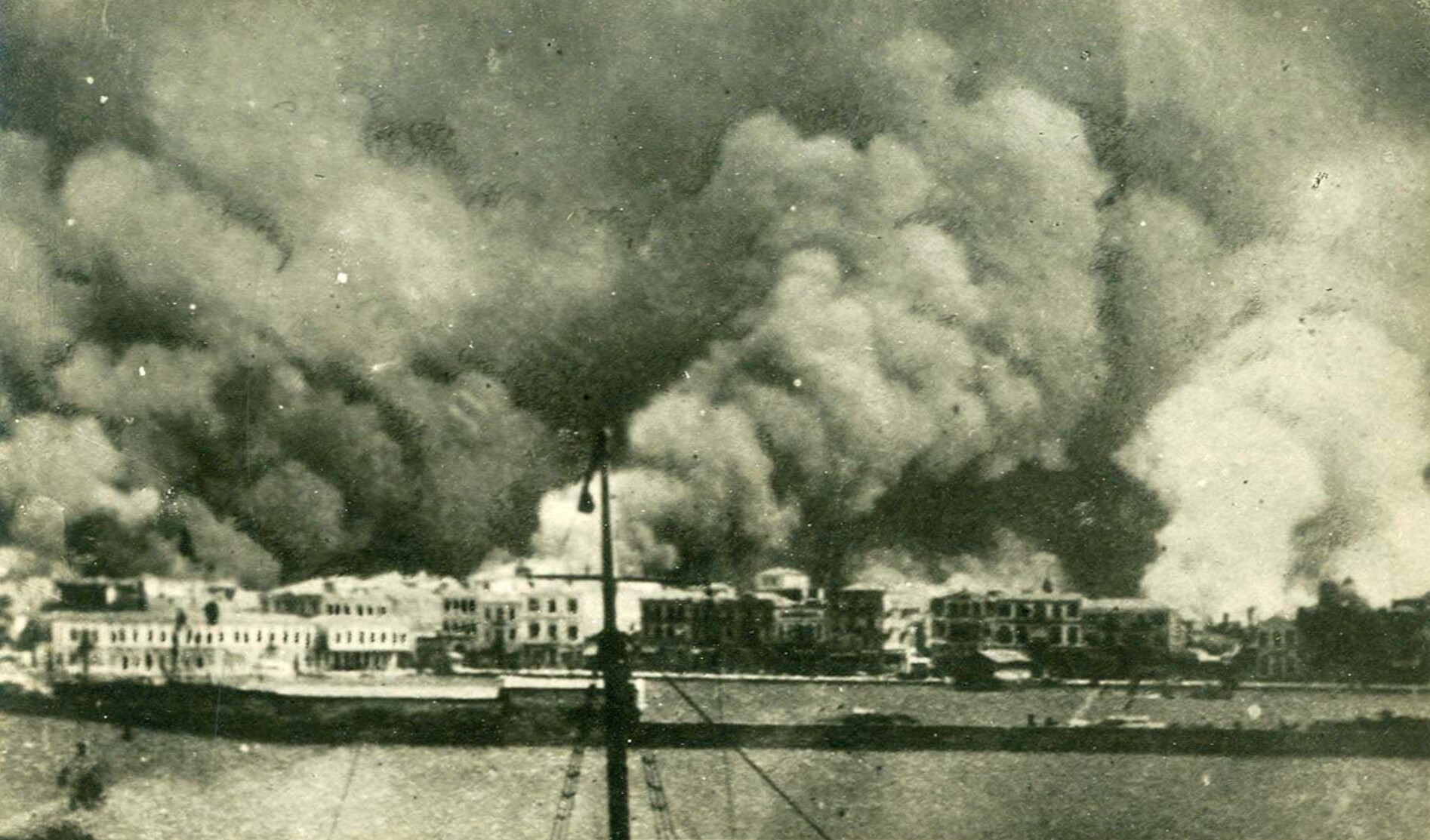
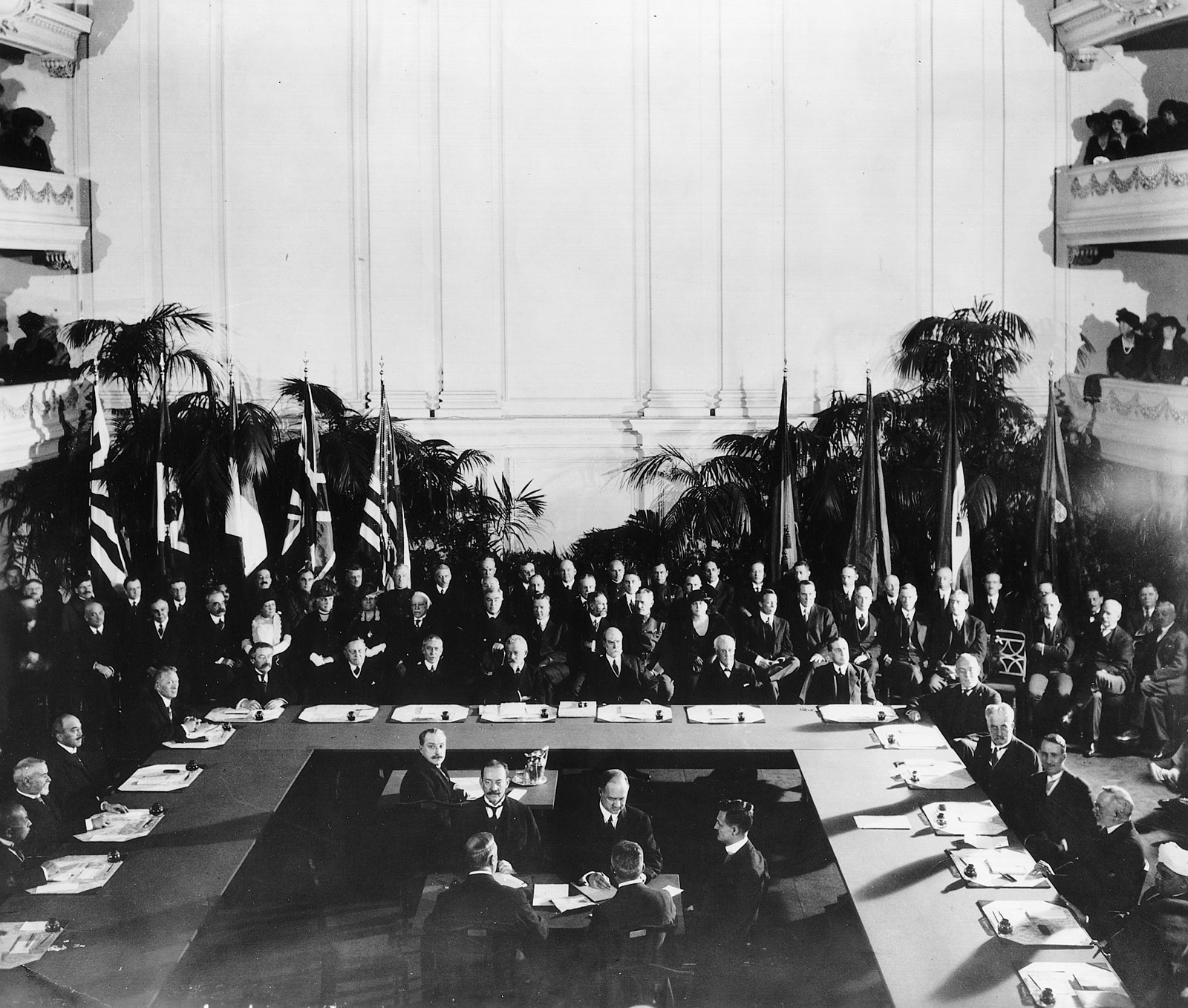
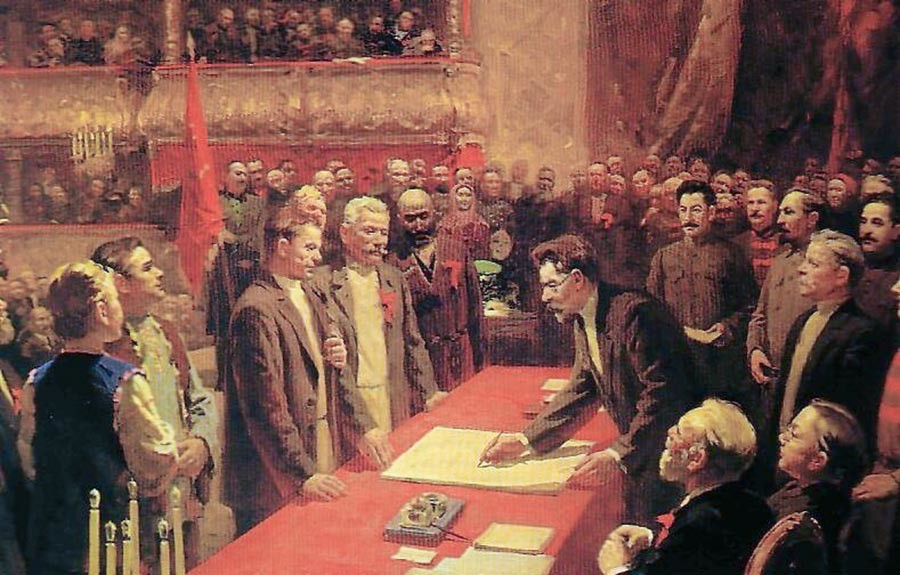
From top to bottom, left to right:
- The Irish Civil War erupts between pro- and anti-Treaty forces after the creation of the Irish Free State, plunging Ireland into a brutal struggle;
- The March on Rome brings Benito Mussolini and the National Fascist Party to power in the Kingdom of Italy, launching fascist rule;
- The discovery of the tomb of Tutankhamun in the Valley of the Kings by Howard Carter sparks worldwide fascination with ancient Egypt;
- The Burning of Smyrna devastates the city in the final phase of the Greco-Turkish War, causing massive destruction and a humanitarian crisis;
- The Washington Naval Treaty limits naval arms among leading powers to prevent another costly race;
- The Treaty on the Creation of the Union of Soviet Socialist Republics forms the Soviet Union, uniting multiple republics under one federal government.

1922 (MCMXXII) was a common year starting on Sunday of the Gregorian calendar and a common year starting on Saturday of the Julian calendar, the 1922nd year of the Common Era (CE) and Anno Domini (AD) designations, the 922nd year of the 2nd millennium, the 22nd year of the 20th century, and the 3rd year of the 1920s decade. As of the start of 1922, the Gregorian calendar was 13 days ahead of the Julian calendar, which remained in localized use until 1923.

== Events ==
=== January ===
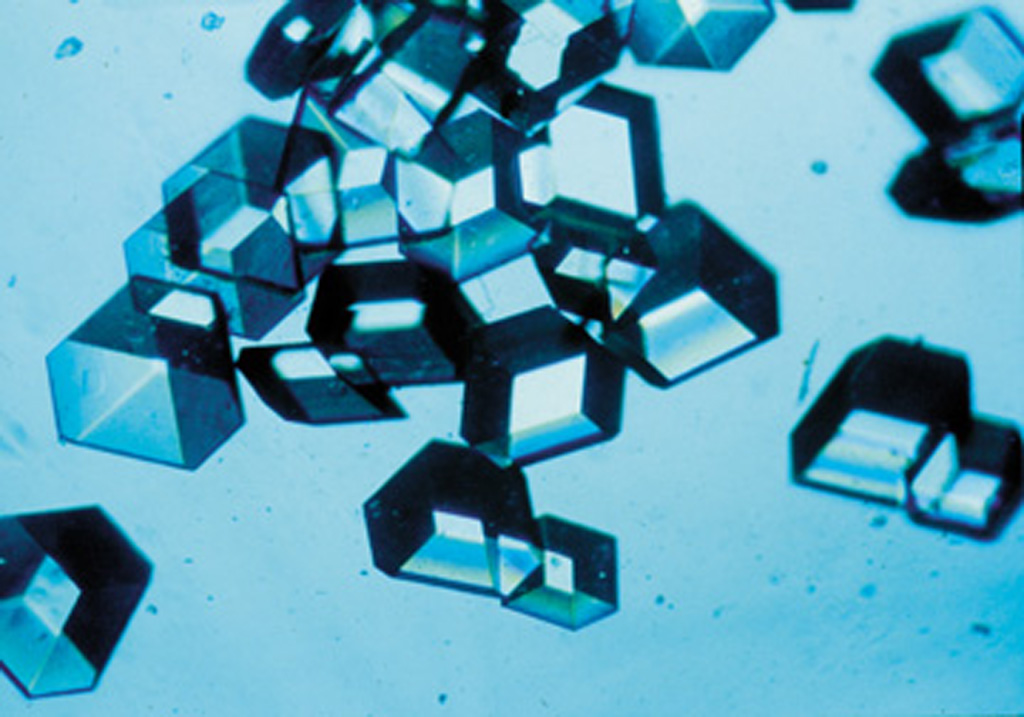
January 11: Use of insulin for diabetes.

- January 7 – Dáil Éireann, the parliament of the Irish Republic, ratifies the Anglo-Irish Treaty by 64–57 votes.
- January 10 – Arthur Griffith is elected President of Dáil Éireann, the day after Éamon de Valera resigns.
- January 11 – The first successful insulin treatment of diabetes is made, by Frederick Banting in Toronto.
- January 15 – Michael Collins becomes Chairman of the Provisional Government of the Irish Free State.
- January 26 – Italian forces occupy Misrata, Libya; the reconquest of Libya begins.

=== February ===
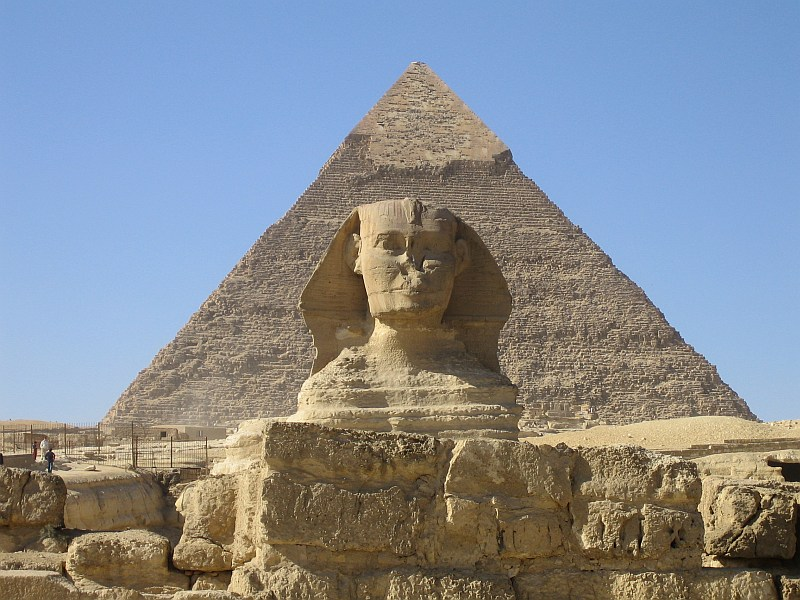
February 28: Egypt independent.

- February 6
  - Pope Pius XI (Achille Ratti) succeeds Pope Benedict XV, to become the 259th pope.
  - The Five Power Naval Disarmament Treaty is signed between the United States, United Kingdom, Japan, France and Italy. Japan returns some of its control over the Shandong Peninsula to China.
- February 8
  - President of the United States Warren G. Harding introduces the first radio in the White House.
  - In the Russian Soviet Federative Socialist Republic, the Cheka becomes the Gosudarstvennoye Politicheskoye Upravlenie (GPU), a section of the NKVD.
- February 10–17 – Modern Art Week in São Paulo marks the start of Modernism in Brazil.
- February 14
  - Finnish Minister of the Interior Heikki Ritavuori is assassinated by Ernst Tandefelt.
  - Baragoola, the last of the Binngarra class Manly ferries, is launched at Balmain, New South Wales.
- February 15 – The inaugural session of the Permanent Court of International Justice (PCIJ) is held in The Hague.
- February 26 – Leser v. Garnett: The Supreme Court of the United States rebuffs a challenge to the Nineteenth Amendment to the United States Constitution, which gave women the right to vote on the same terms as men.
- February 28 – The Unilateral Declaration of Egyptian Independence by the United Kingdom ends its protectorate over Egypt, and grants the country nominal independence, reserving control of military and diplomatic matters.

=== March ===
- March 2
  - An ice mass breaks the Oder Dam in Breslau.
  - The British Civil Aviation Authority is established.
- March 4 – The silent horror film Nosferatu is premièred at the Berlin Zoological Garden in Germany.
- March 10 – Mahatma Gandhi is arrested in Bombay for sedition.
- March 13 – Edward, Prince of Wales, inaugurates the Prince of Wales Royal Indian Military College in Dehradun, India, marking a capitulation of the Governor General and Secretary of State for India to growing pressure for Indianization of the officer cadre of the Indian Army.
- March 15 – With Egypt having gained self-government from the United Kingdom, Fuad I becomes King of Egypt.
- March 16 – The Rand Rebellion, which began as a strike by white South African mine workers on 28 December 1921 and became open rebellion against the state, is suppressed.
- March 18 – In British India, Mahatma Gandhi is sentenced to six years in prison for sedition (he serves only two).
- March 20 – The USS Langley is commissioned as the first United States Navy aircraft carrier.
- March 22 – Radio station WLW in Cincinnati begins broadcasting.
- March 23 – Queensland, Australia, abolishes the Legislative Council (Upper House).
- March 26 – The German Social Democratic Party is founded in Poland.
- March 31 – Six die in the Hinterkaifeck murders north of Munich.

=== April ===
- April 1 – South African Railways takes control of all railway operations in South West Africa.
- April 3 – Joseph Stalin is appointed General Secretary of the Central Committee of the Soviet Communist Party.
- April 7 – 1922 Picardie mid-air collision: The first midair collision between airliners occurs, between a Daimler Airway de Havilland DH.18 and a Grands Express Aériens Farman Goliath over Poix-de-Picardie, Amiens, France.
- April 10 – Genoa Conference: The representatives of 34 countries convene to speak in Genoa, Italy about monetary economics, in the wake of World War I.
- April 12 – The United Kingdom's Prince of Wales arrives in Yokohama aboard HMS Renown and rides by train to Tokyo, starting a one-month visit to Japan.
- April 13 – The State of Massachusetts opens all public offices to women.
- April 16 – The Treaty of Rapallo marks a rapprochement between the Weimar Republic and Bolshevik Russia.
- April 24 – The first portion of the Imperial Wireless Chain, a strategic international wireless telegraphy network created to link the British Empire, is opened, from the UK to Egypt.

=== May ===
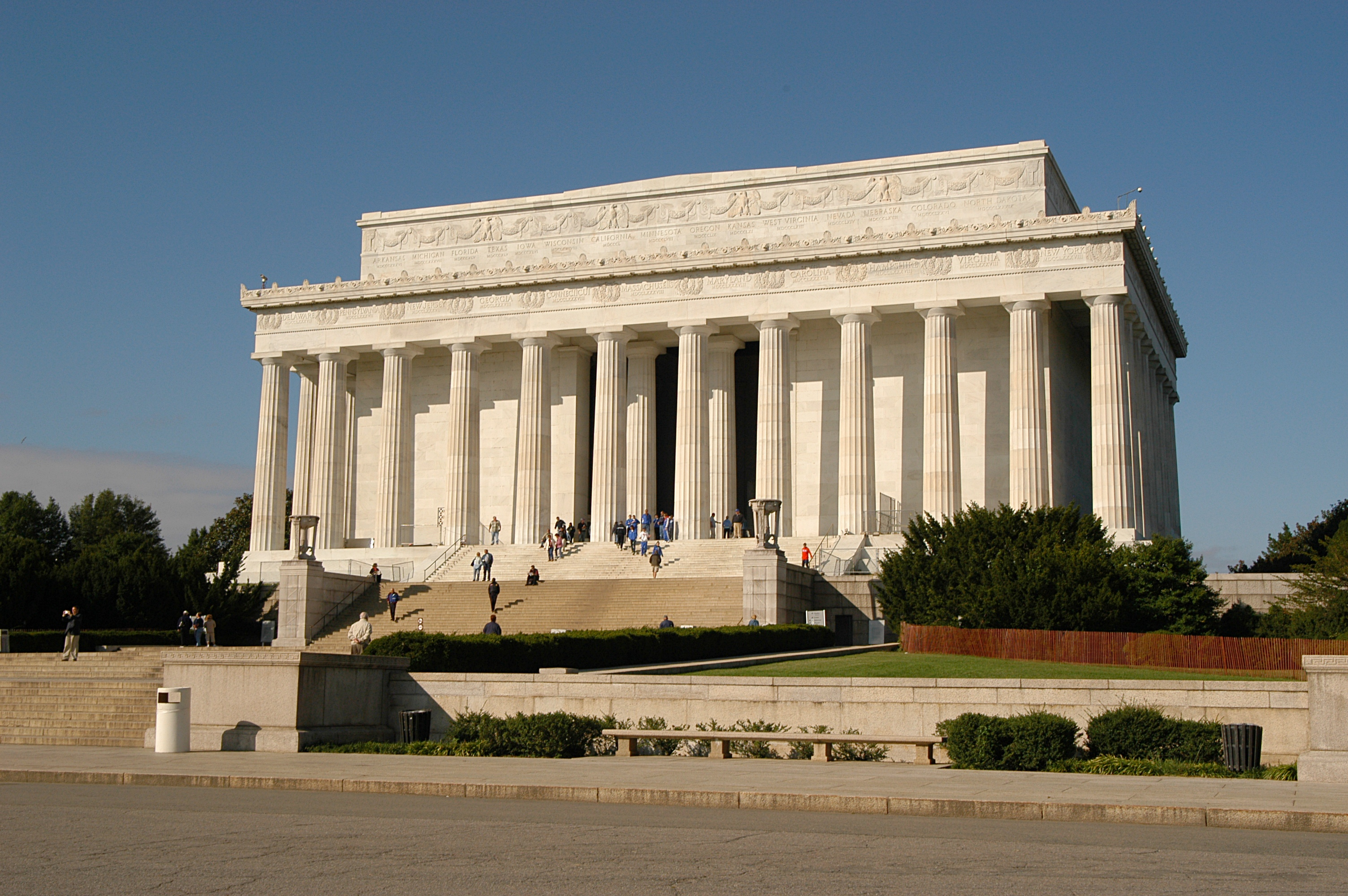
May 30: Lincoln Memorial dedicated.

- May 8 – In Moscow, eight priests, two laymen and one woman are sentenced to death for opposition to the Soviet government's confiscation of church property.
- May 18 – Sergei Diaghilev, Igor Stravinsky, Pablo Picasso, Marcel Proust, James Joyce, Erik Satie and Clive Bell dine together at the Hotel Majestic in Paris, their only joint meeting.
- May 19 – The All-Russian Young Pioneer Organisation is established.
- May 29 – British Liberal MP Horatio Bottomley is jailed for seven years for fraud.
- May 30 – In Washington, D.C., United States, the Lincoln Memorial is dedicated.

=== June ===
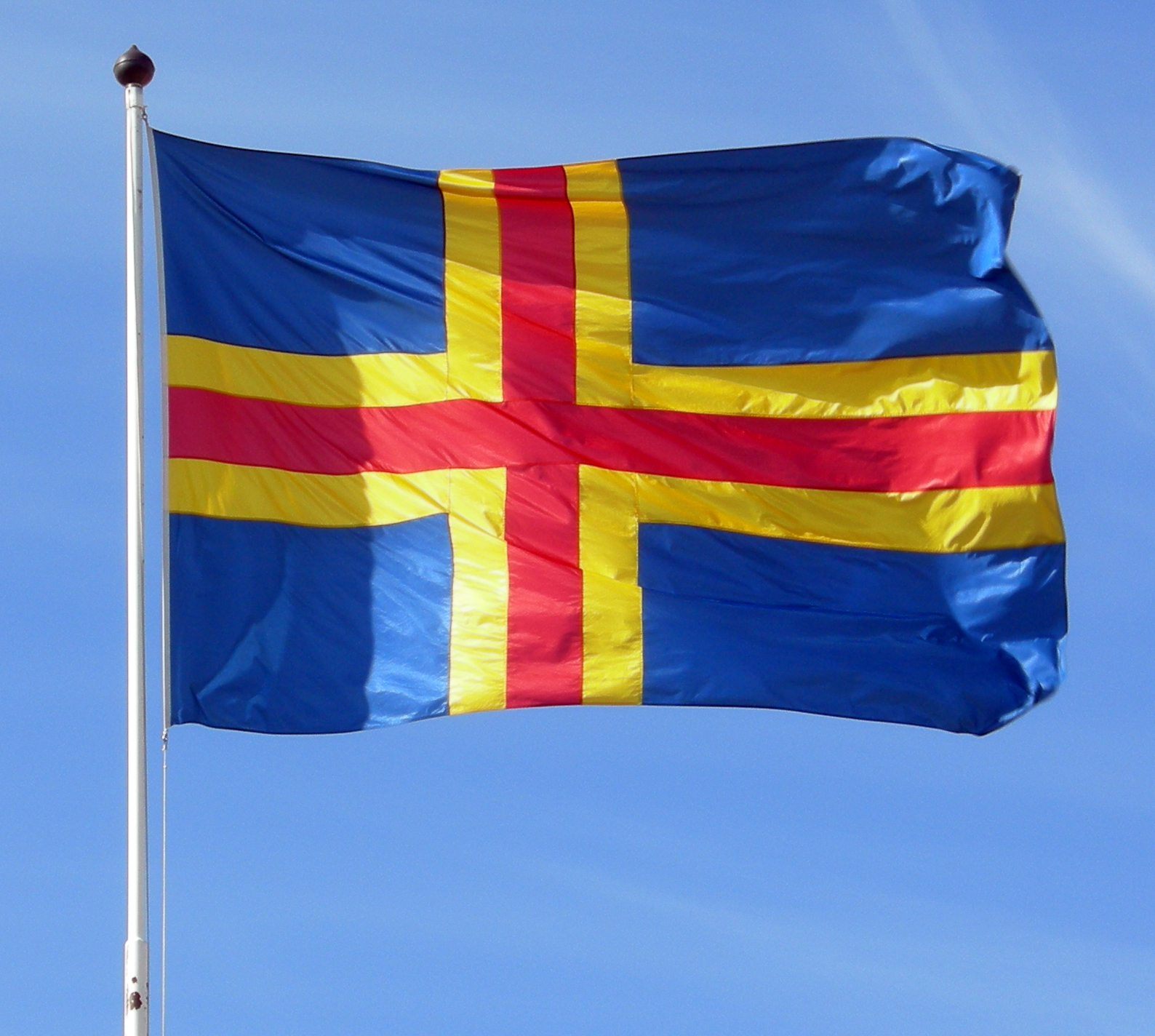
June 9: Åland's Autonomy Day

- June 1
  - Bolshevik forces defeat Basmachi troops, under Enver Pasha.
  - The first issue of the magazine Krestyanka is published in Russia.
- June 9 – Åland's Regional Assembly convenes for its first plenary session in Mariehamn, Åland; the day will be celebrated as Self-Government Day of Åland.
- June 11 – Robert J. Flaherty's Nanook of the North, the first commercially successful feature-length documentary film, is premiered in the U.S.
- June 14 – President of the United States Warren G. Harding makes his first speech on the radio.
- June 22 – Irish Republican Army agents assassinate British Army field marshal Sir Henry Wilson in London; the assassins are sentenced to death on July 18.
- June 24 – Weimar Republic foreign minister Walther Rathenau is assassinated; the murderers are captured on July 17.
- June 26 – Louis Honoré Charles Antoine Grimaldi becomes Reigning Prince Louis II of Monaco.
- June 28
  - The Irish Civil War and Battle of Dublin begin when the Irish National Army, using artillery loaned by the British, begins to bombard the anti-Treaty Irish Republican Army forces occupying the Four Courts in Dublin. Fighting in Dublin lasts until July 5.
  - The Syrian Federation is constituted by arrêté of Henri Gouraud.
- June 29 – Subhi Barakat becomes president of the Syrian Federation.

=== July ===
- July 11 – The Hollywood Bowl open-air music venue opens.
- July 17 – The final signings of Treaty 11, an agreement between George V, King of Canada, and various Canadian First Nations, are conducted at Fort Liard.
- July 20 – The German protectorate of Togoland is divided into the League of Nations mandates of French Togoland and British Togoland.
- July 27 – The Cherkess (Adyghe) Autonomous Oblast is established within the Russian SFSR.
- July – Hyperinflation in Germany means that 563 marks are now needed to buy a single American dollar – more than double the 263 needed eight months before, dwarfing the mere 12 needed in April 1919, and even the 47 needed in December of that year.

=== August ===
- August 2 – The 1922 Swatow typhoon hits Shantou, China, killing more than 5,000 people.
- August 22 – Irish Civil War: General Michael Collins is assassinated in West Cork.
- August 23
  - Morocco revolts against the Spanish.
- August 26
  - A Turkish large-scale attack opens against Greek forces in Afyon; Turkish victory is achieved on August 30.
- August 28 – Japan agrees to withdraw its troops from Siberia.
- August
  - Hyperinflation in Germany sees the value of the Papiermark against the dollar rise to 1,000.
  - The last hunted California grizzly bear is shot.

=== September ===
- September 3 – The Autodromo Nazionale di Monza, the world's third purpose-built motorsport race track, is officially opened at Monza in the Lombardy Region of Italy.
- September 9 – Turkish forces pursuing withdrawing Greek troops enter İzmir, effectively ending the Greco-Turkish War (1919–1922).
- September 11
  - The Sun News-Pictorial, a predecessor of the Melbourne, Australia, Herald Sun, is founded.
  - The Mandate of Palestine is approved by the Council of the League of Nations.
- September 13 – The Gdynia Seaport Construction Act is passed by the Polish Parliament.
- September 13–15 – The Great Fire of Smyrna destroys most of İzmir. Responsibility is disputed.
- September 17 – Dutch cyclist Piet Moeskops becomes world champion sprinter.
- September 18 – The Kingdom of Hungary joins the League of Nations.
- September 24 - The Latvia national football team and Estonia national football team played their first official international match.
- September 24 (O. S. September 11) – 11 September 1922 Revolution in Greece.
- September 29 – Drums in the Night (Trommeln in der Nacht) becomes the first play by Bertolt Brecht to be staged, at the Munich Kammerspiele.

=== October ===
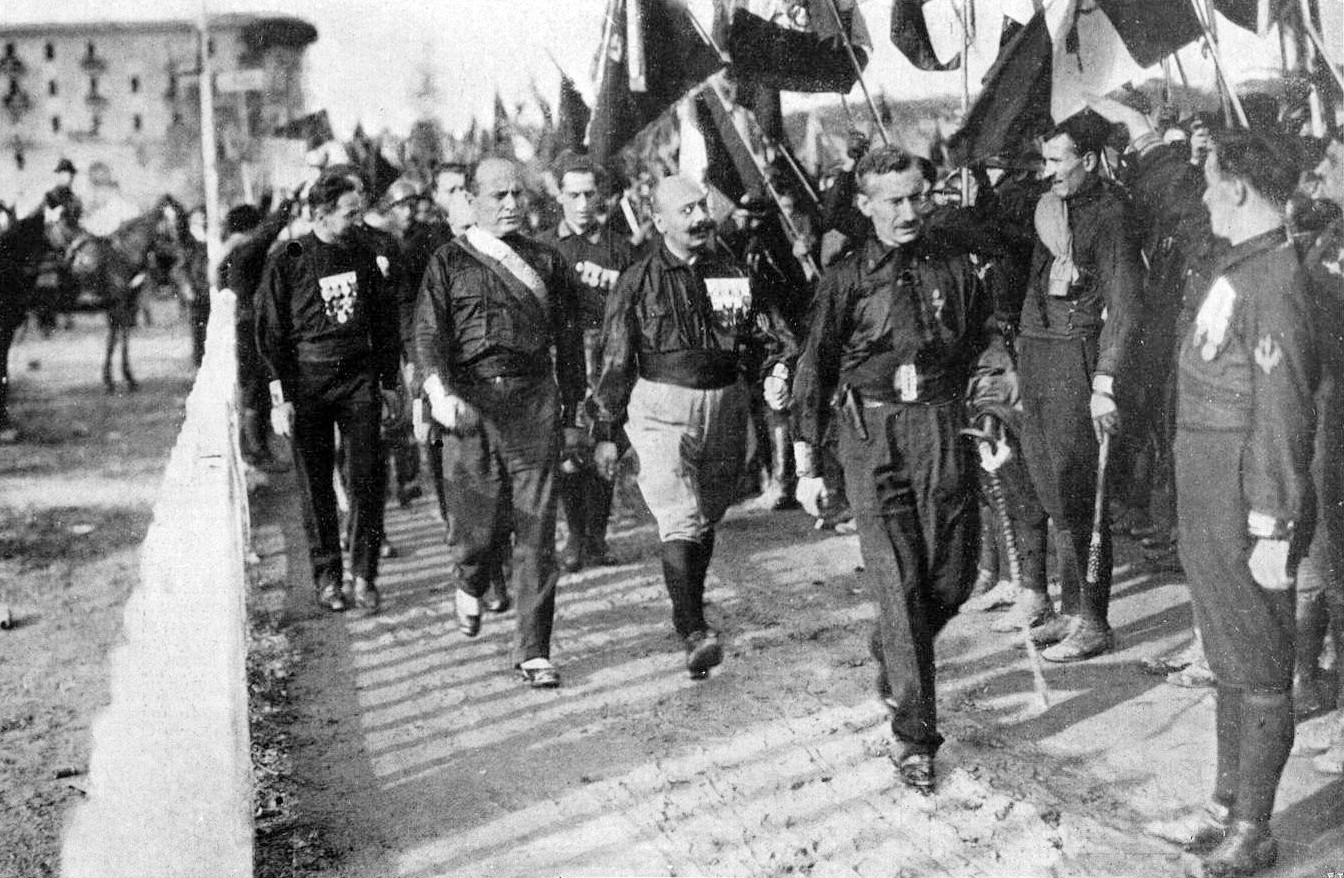
Benito Mussolini and Fascist Blackshirts during the March on Rome.

- October – 3,000 German marks are now needed to buy a single American dollar – triple the figure three months ago due to hyperinflation.
- October 1 – G. I. Gurdjieff opens his Institute for the Harmonious Development of Man at Fontainebleau, France.
- October 3 – Rebecca Latimer Felton becomes the first female U.S. senator when Georgia's governor gives her a temporary appointment pending an election to replace Senator Thomas Watson, who has died suddenly.
- October 11 – Greco-Turkish War of 1919-1922 ends in Turkish victory.
- October 15 – T. S. Eliot establishes The Criterion magazine, containing the first publication of his poem The Waste Land. This first appears in the United States later this month in The Dial (dated November 1), and is first published complete with notes in book form, by Boni and Liveright in New York in December.
- October 18 – The British Broadcasting Company is formed.
- October 25 – The 3rd Dáil enacts the Constitution of the Irish Free State.
- October 27 – Southern Rhodesians reject union with South Africa in a referendum.
- October 28
  - In Italy, the March on Rome brings the National Fascist Party and Benito Mussolini to power. Italy begins a period of dictatorship that lasts until the end of the Second World War.
  - The Red Army occupies Vladivostok.
  - Rose Bowl sports stadium officially opens in Pasadena, California.
- October 31 – Benito Mussolini, 39, becomes the youngest ever Prime Minister of Italy.

=== November ===
- November 1
  - The Ottoman Empire is abolished after 600 years, and its last sultan, Mehmed VI, abdicates, leaving for exile, initially in Malta, on November 17.
  - A broadcast receiving licence with a fee of ten shillings is introduced in the United Kingdom.
- November 4 – Discovery of the tomb of Tutankhamun: in Egypt, English archaeologist Howard Carter and his men find the entrance to the pharaonic tomb of Tutankhamun in the Valley of the Kings.
- November 12 – Sigma Gamma Rho (ΣΓΡ) Sorority, Incorporated is founded by seven educators in Indianapolis, Indiana. The group becomes an incorporated national collegiate sorority on December 30, 1929, when a charter is granted to the Alpha chapter at Butler University in Indianapolis.
- November 14 – The British Broadcasting Company (BBC) begins radio service in the United Kingdom, broadcasting from station 2LO in London.
- November 15
  - In the 1922 United Kingdom general election forced by the Conservatives' withdrawal from the coalition government, the Conservative Party wins an overall majority. Labour for the first time becomes the main opposition party, winning more seats than the divided Liberals. A dining club of newly elected Conservative Members of Parliament evolves the following year into the 1922 Committee.
  - 1922 Guayaquil general strike: During a 3-day strike action in the city of Guayaquil, Ecuador, police and military fire into a crowd, killing at least 300.
- November 19 – Abdülmecid II, Crown Prince of the Ottoman Empire, is elected Caliph.
- November 21 – Rebecca Felton of Georgia takes the oath of office, formally becoming the first woman United States Senator.
- November 24 – Popular author and anti-Treaty Republican Erskine Childers is executed by firing squad in Dublin, after conviction by an Irish Free State military court for the unlawful possession of a gun, a weapon presented to him by Michael Collins in 1920 as a gift.

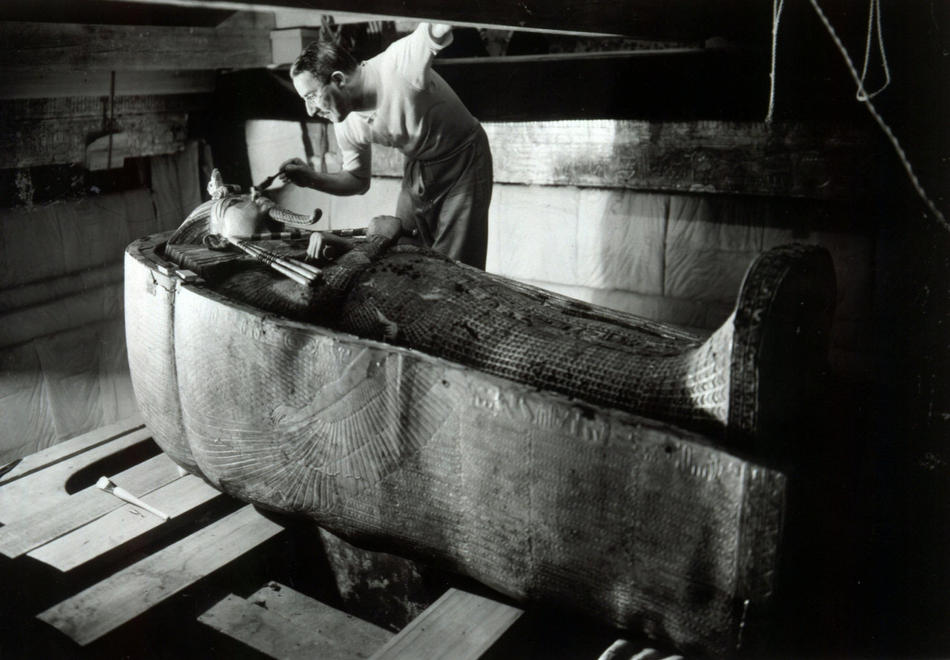
Howard Carter in King Tutankhamun's tomb

- November 26 – Howard Carter and Lord Carnarvon become the first people to see inside KV62, the tomb of Pharaoh Tutankhamun, in over 3,000 years.

=== December ===
The Union of Soviet Socialist Republics is created. (Coat of arms until 1936).

- December 5 – The British Parliament enacts the Irish Free State Constitution Act, by which it legally sanctions the new Constitution of the Irish Free State.
- December 6 – The Irish Free State officially comes into existence. George V becomes the Free State's monarch. Tim Healy is appointed first Governor-General of the Irish Free State, and W. T. Cosgrave becomes President of the Executive Council.
- December 9 – Gabriel Narutowicz is elected the first president of Poland.
- December 11 – The trial of Edith Thompson and Frederick Bywaters ends at the Old Bailey in London, for the murder of Thompson's husband; both are found guilty and sentenced to hang.
- December 16 – Gabriel Narutowicz, sworn on December 11 as first president of the Second Polish Republic, is assassinated by a right-wing sympathizer in Warsaw.
- December 20 – Antigone by Jean Cocteau appears on stage in Paris, with settings by Pablo Picasso, music by Arthur Honegger and costumes by Coco Chanel.
- December 27 – Japanese aircraft carrier Hōshō becomes the first purpose-designed aircraft carrier to be commissioned.
- December 30 – Russia, Ukraine, Belarus and the Transcaucasian Republic (Armenia, Azerbaijan and Georgia) come together to form the Union of Soviet Socialist Republics.
- December – The year ends with hyperinflation showing no sign of slowing down in Germany, with 7,000 marks now needed to buy a single American dollar.

=== Date unknown ===
- Wracked by rapid inflation and political assassinations, and motivated by hostility and arrogance as well, the Weimar Republic announces its inability to pay more, and proposes a moratorium on reparations for 3 years.
- Kurd Istigdul Djemijetin, the Kurdish Independence Committee, is founded.
- The Inter-Parliamentary Union is established.
- L'Action sénégalaise weekly newspaper is founded in Senegal.
- Earl W. Bascom, rodeo cowboy and artist, designs and makes rodeo's first hornless bronc saddle at Lethbridge, Alberta, Canada.
- Vegemite is invented by Australian entrepreneur Fred Walker.
- The Barbary lion becomes extinct in the wild, with the last killed in Morocco, in the area of the Zelan and Beni Mguild Forests.
- The Amur tiger becomes extinct in South Korea.
- During his first rebellion, Simko Shikak launched an attack on Mahabad in mid-May and July. In the ensuing fighting, Simko's forces captured Mahabad and killed a Persian commander.

== Births ==
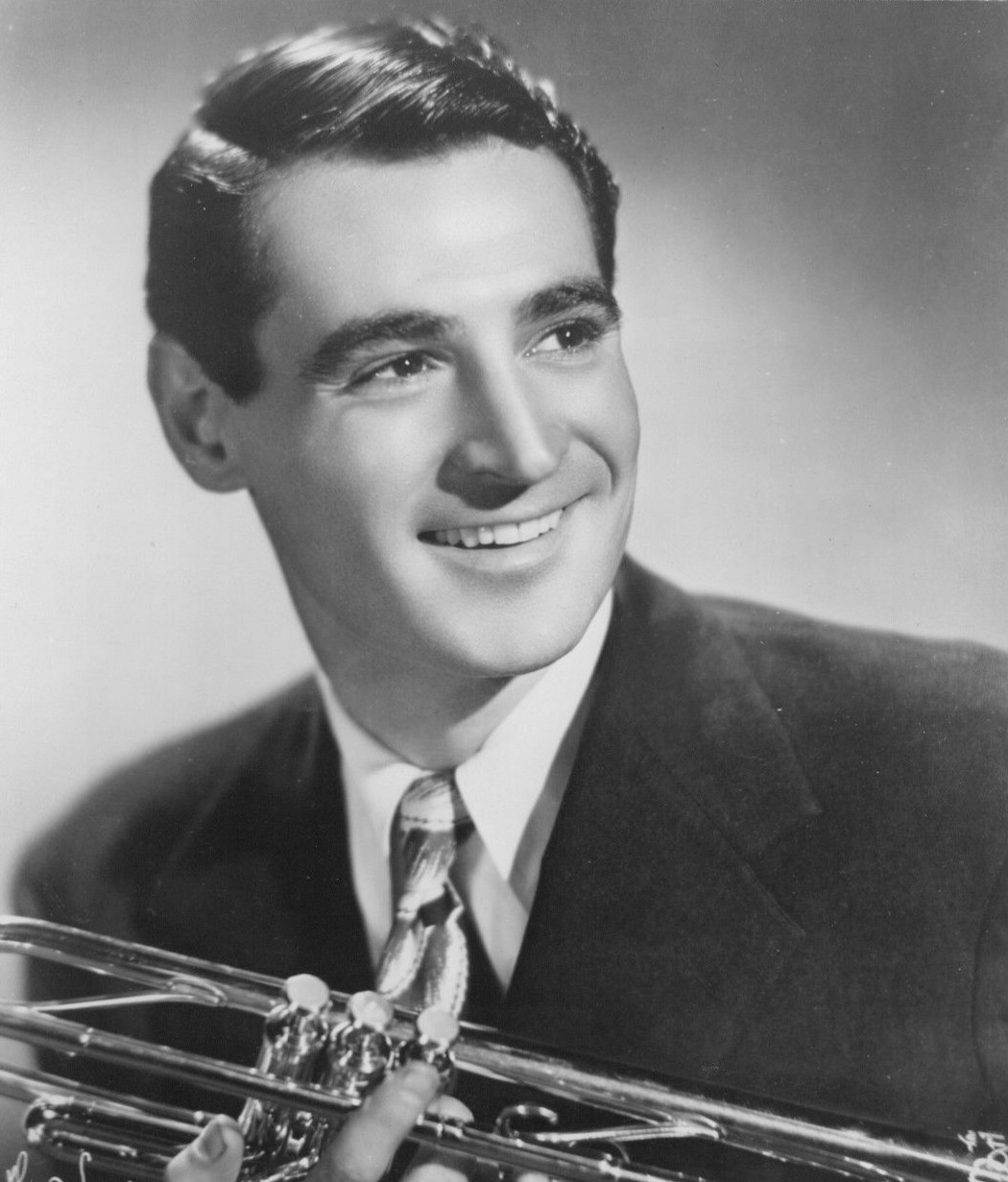
Ray Anthony

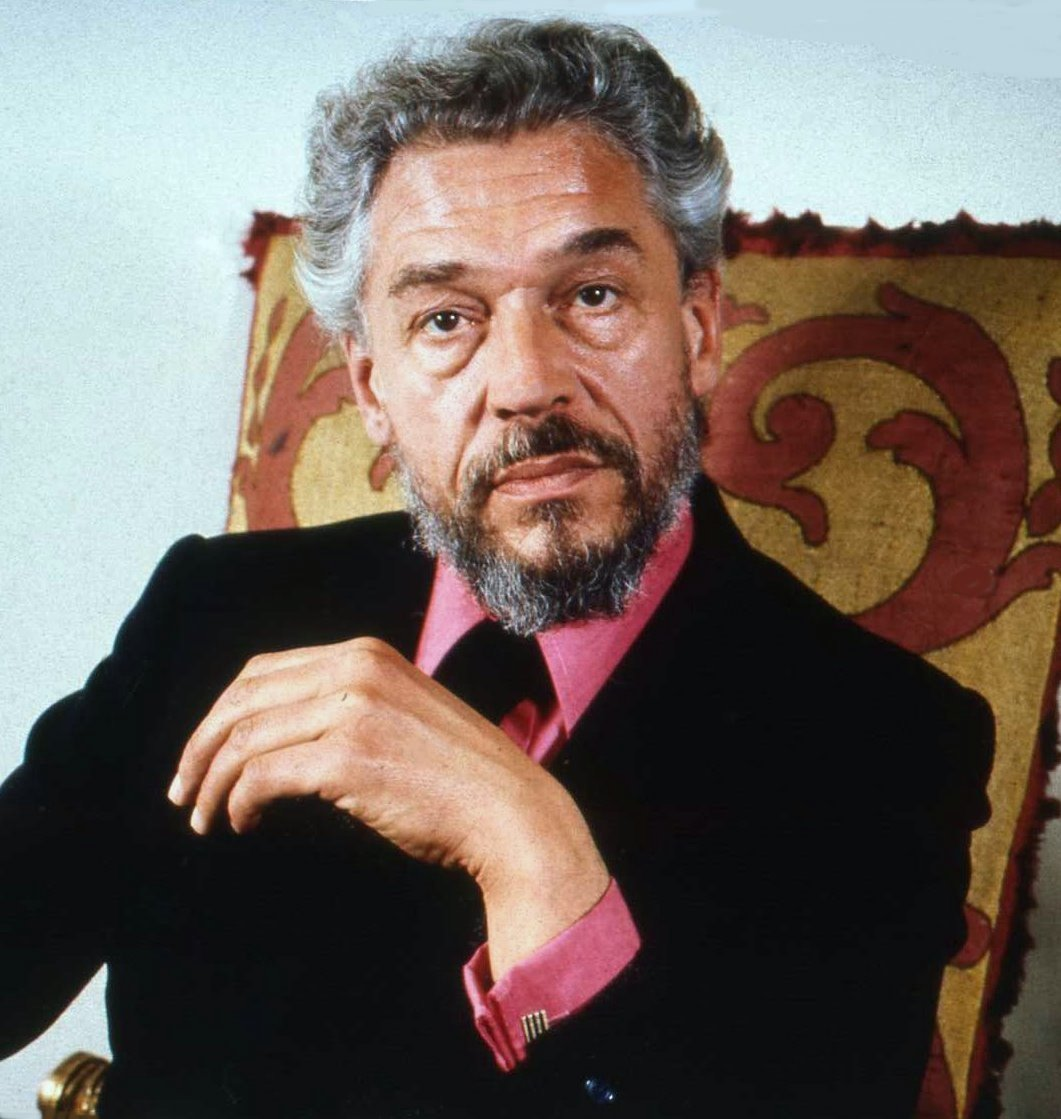
Paul Scofield

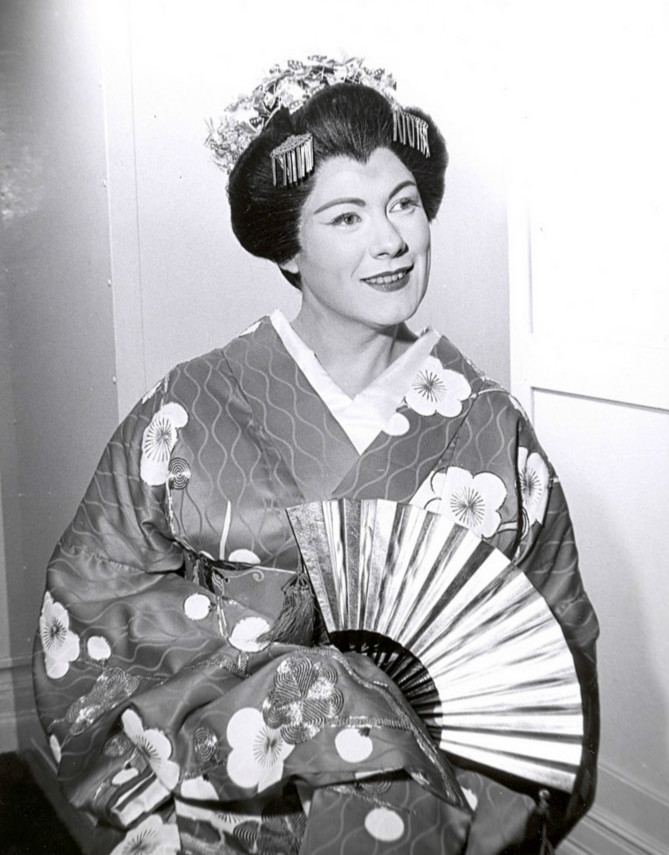
Renata Tebaldi

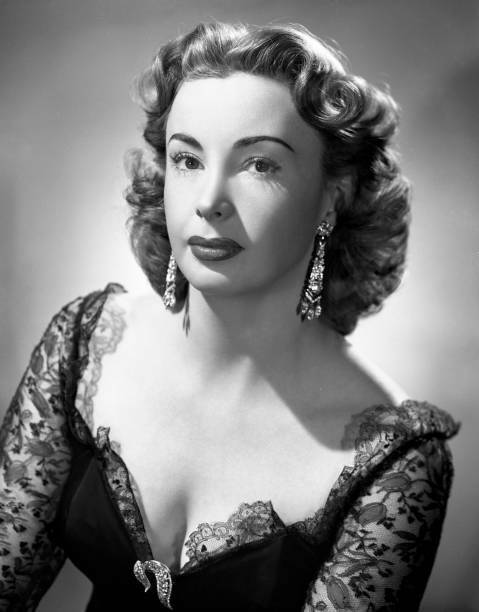
Audrey Meadows

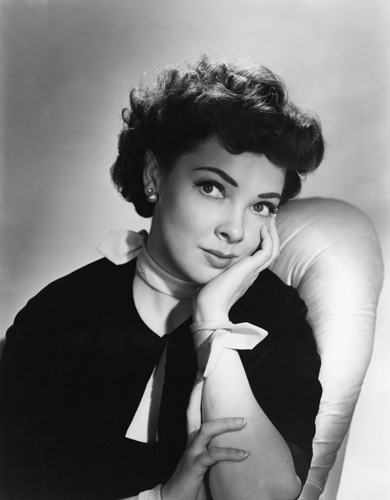
Kathryn Grayson

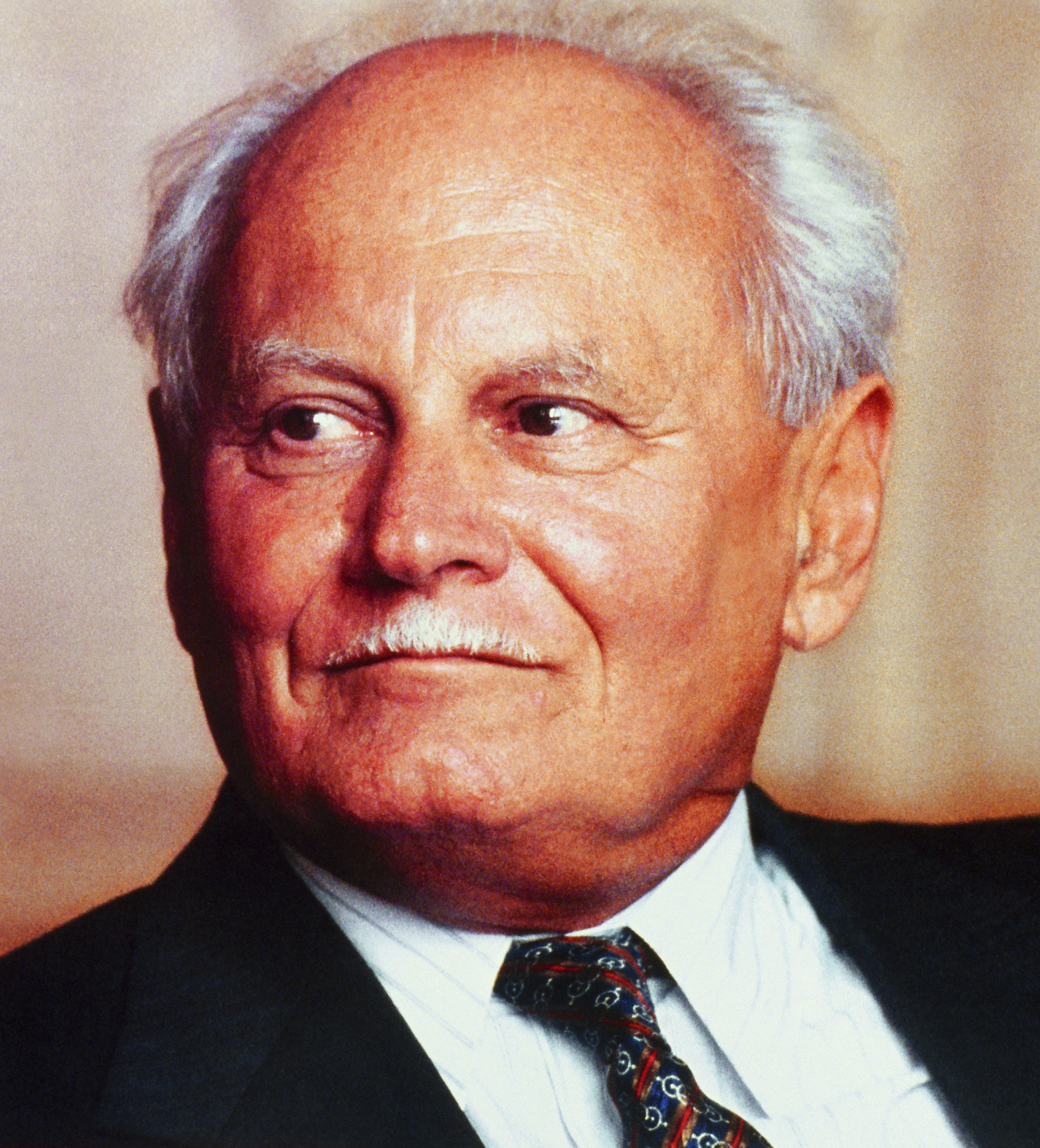
Árpád Göncz

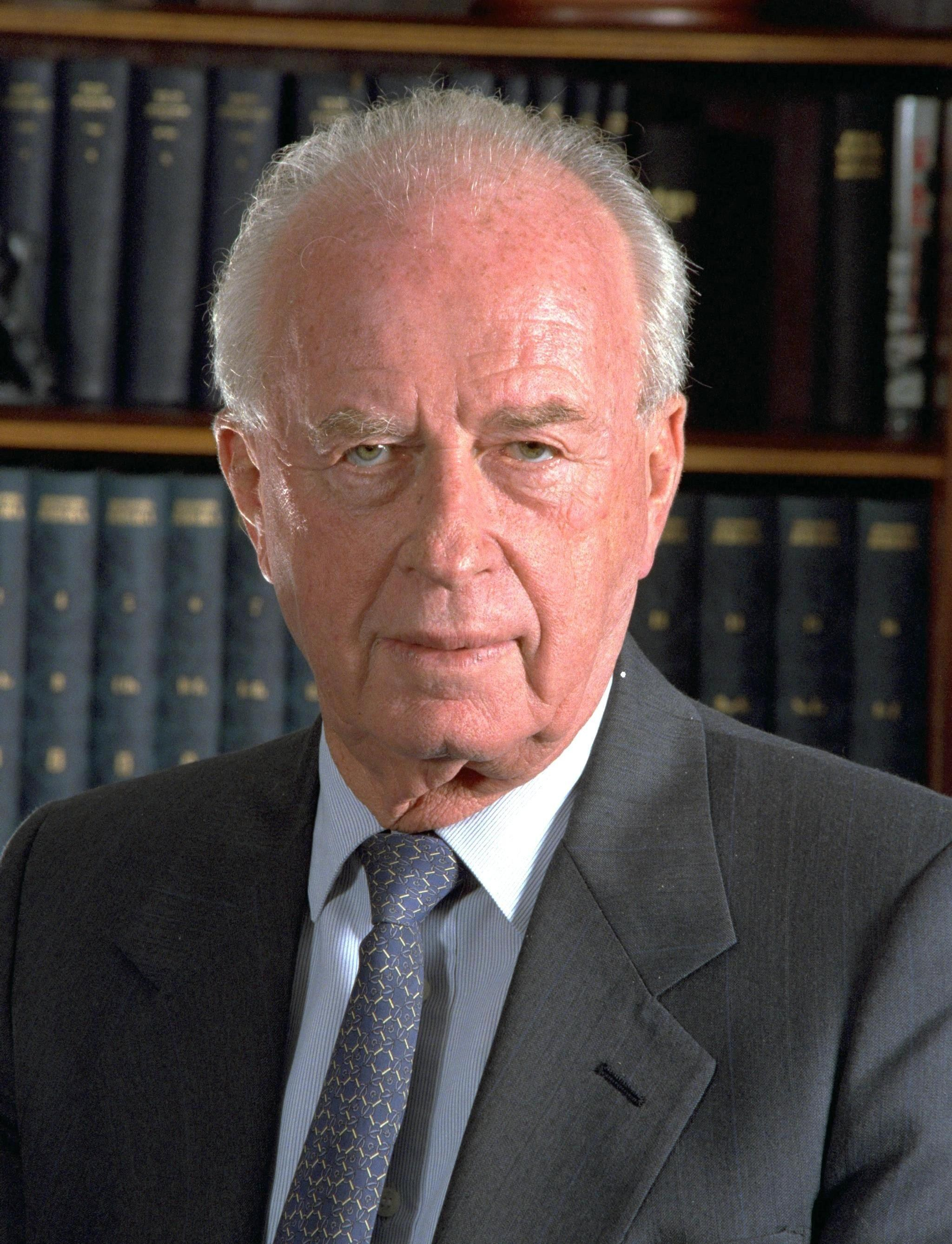
Yitzhak Rabin

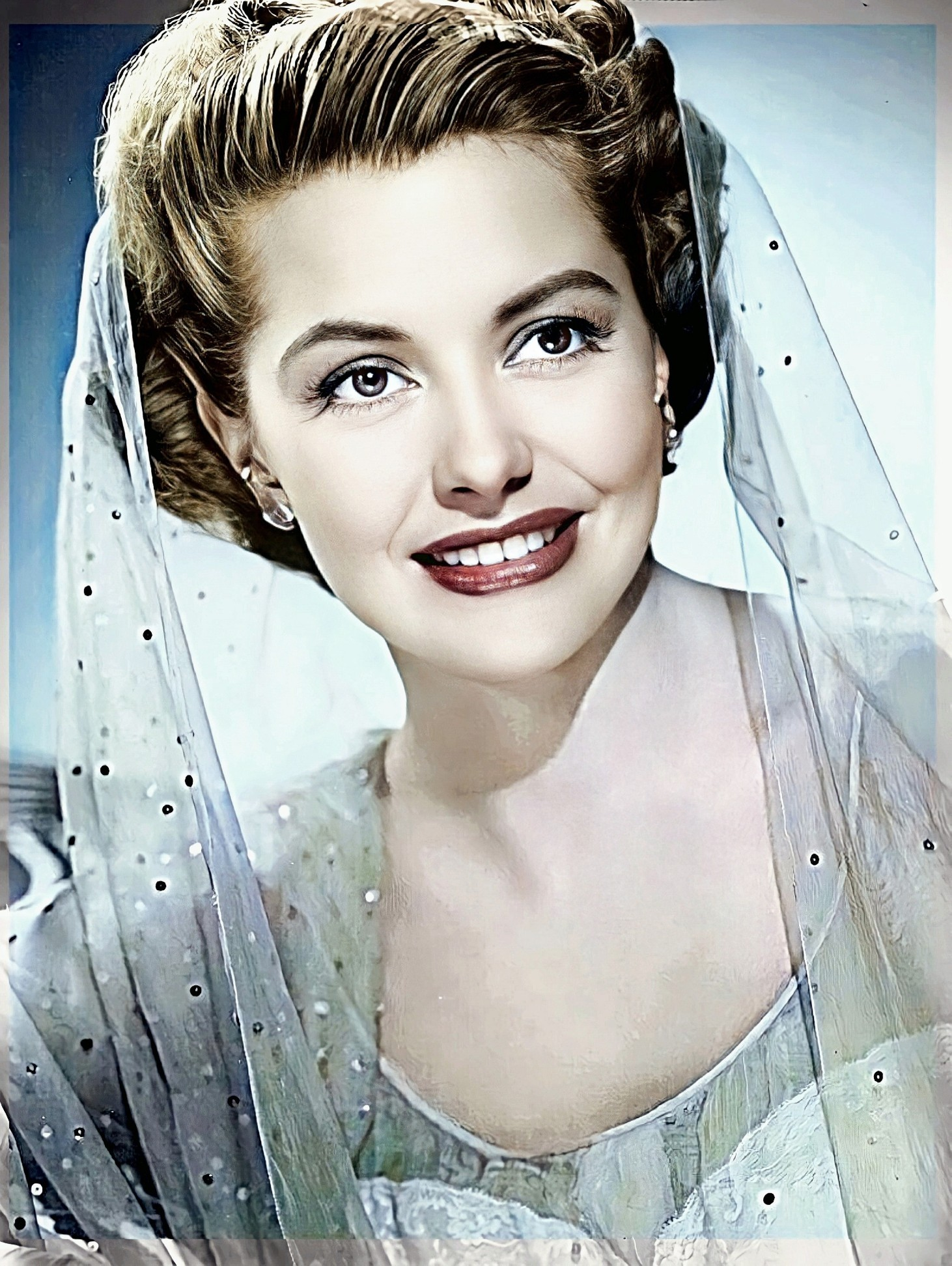
Cyd Charisse

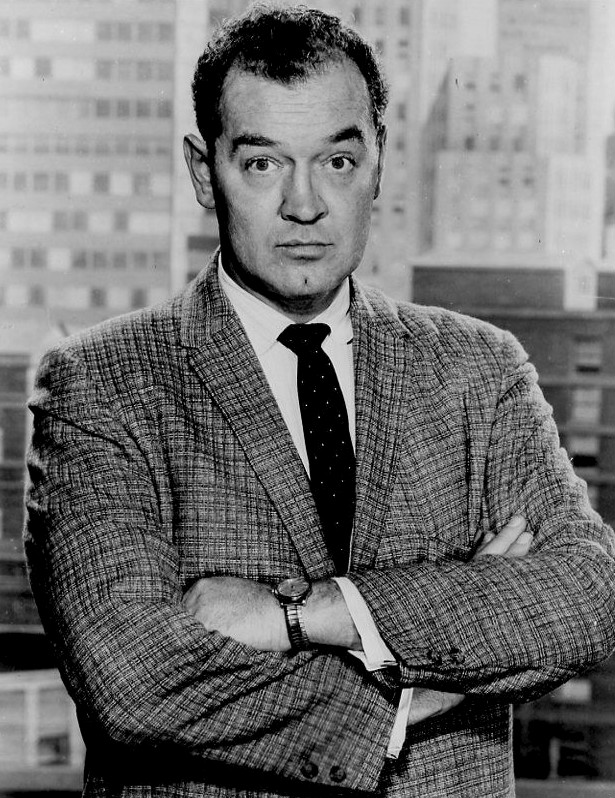
Arch Johnson

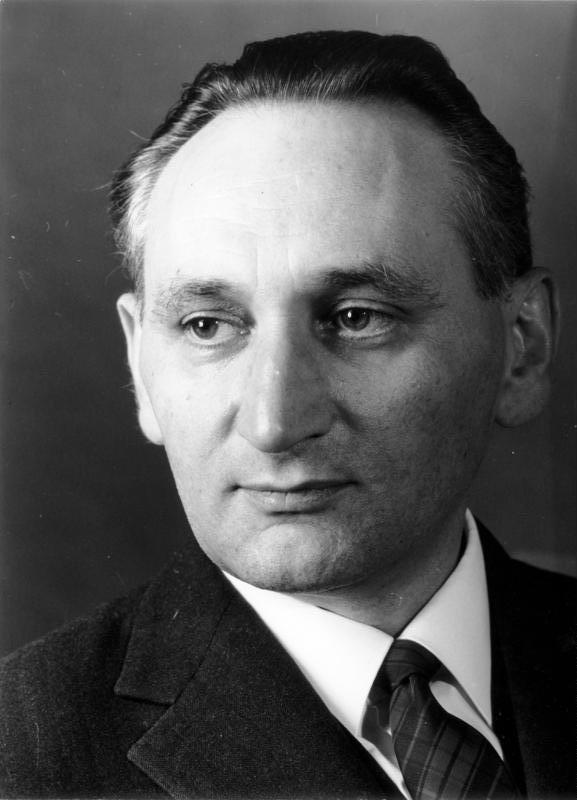
Egon Bahr

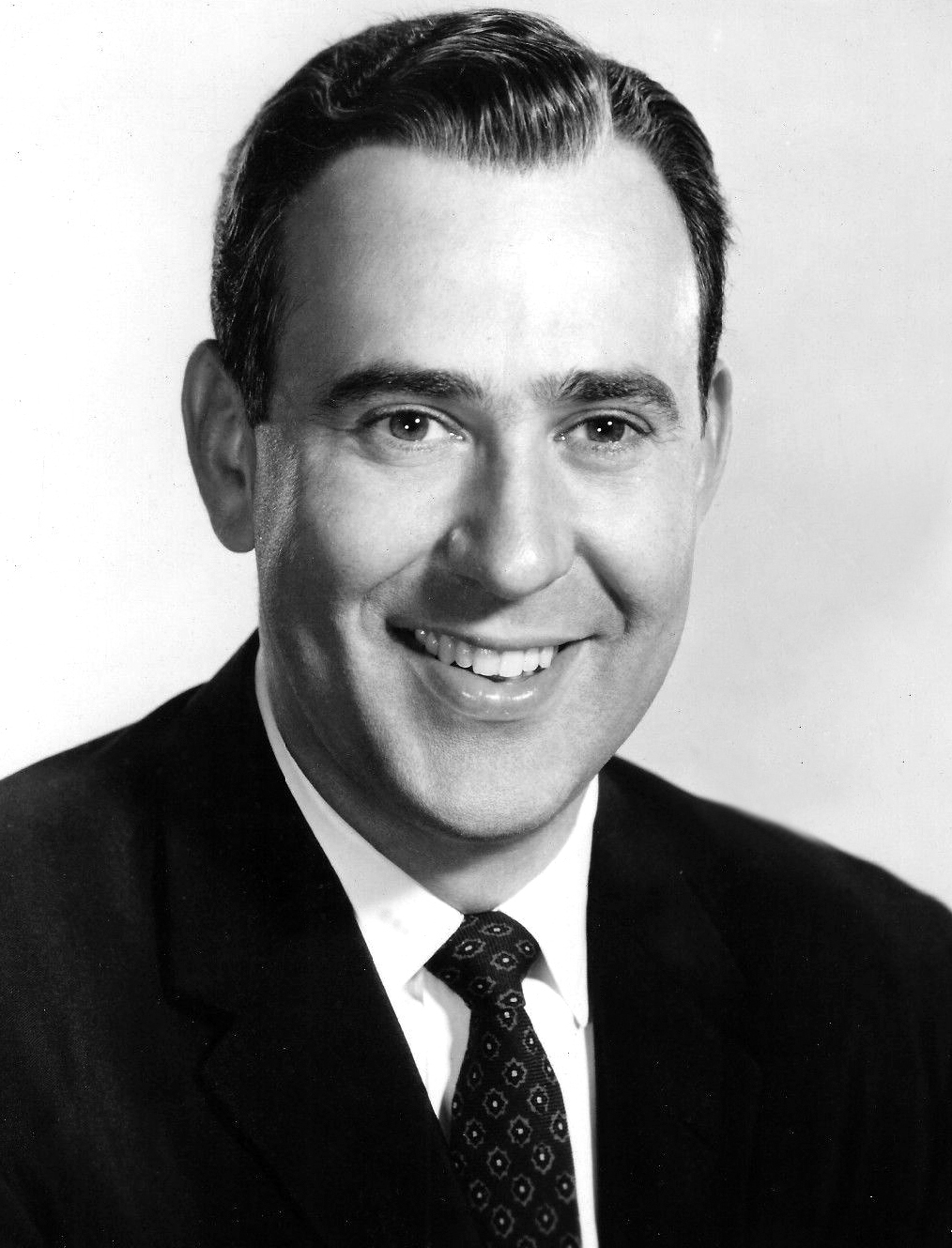
Carl Reiner

Prince Heinrich of Bavaria

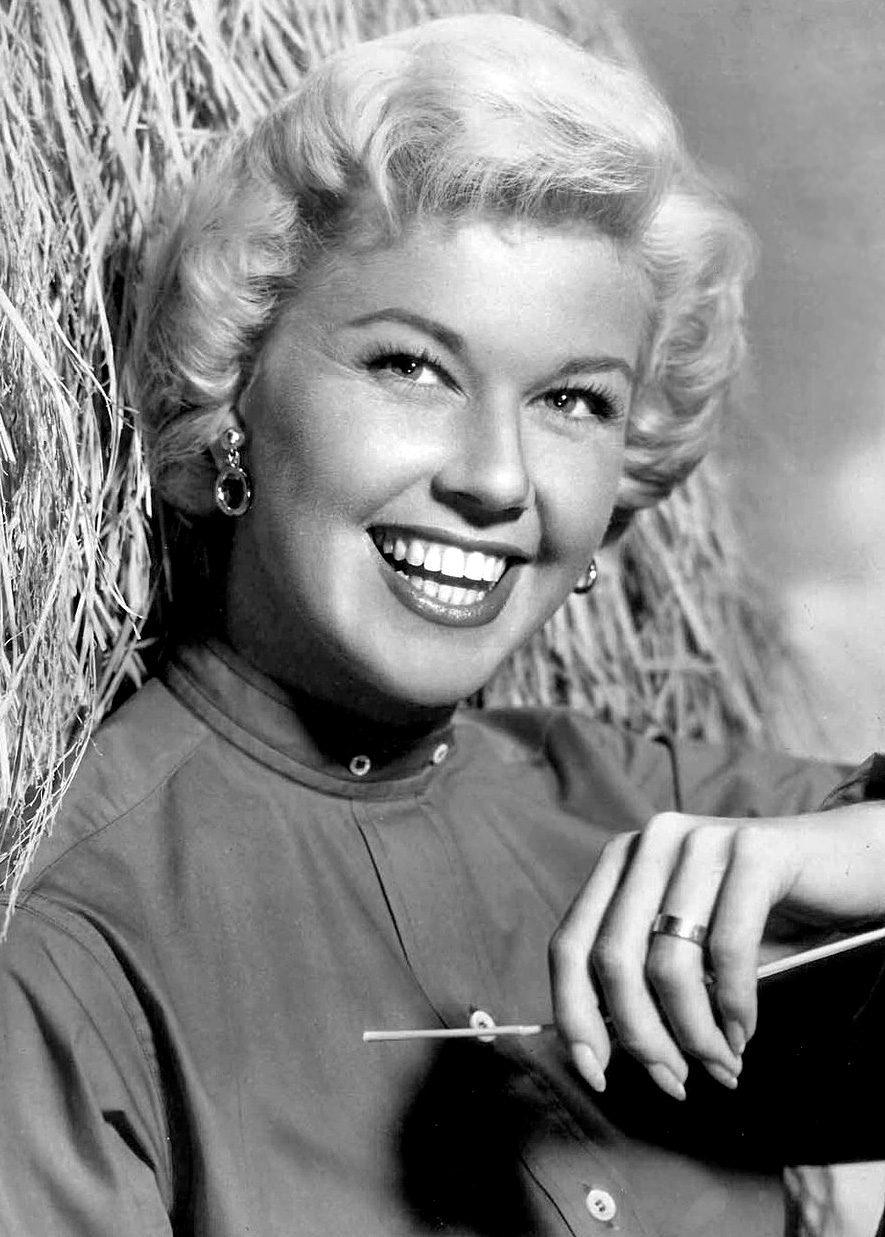
Doris Day

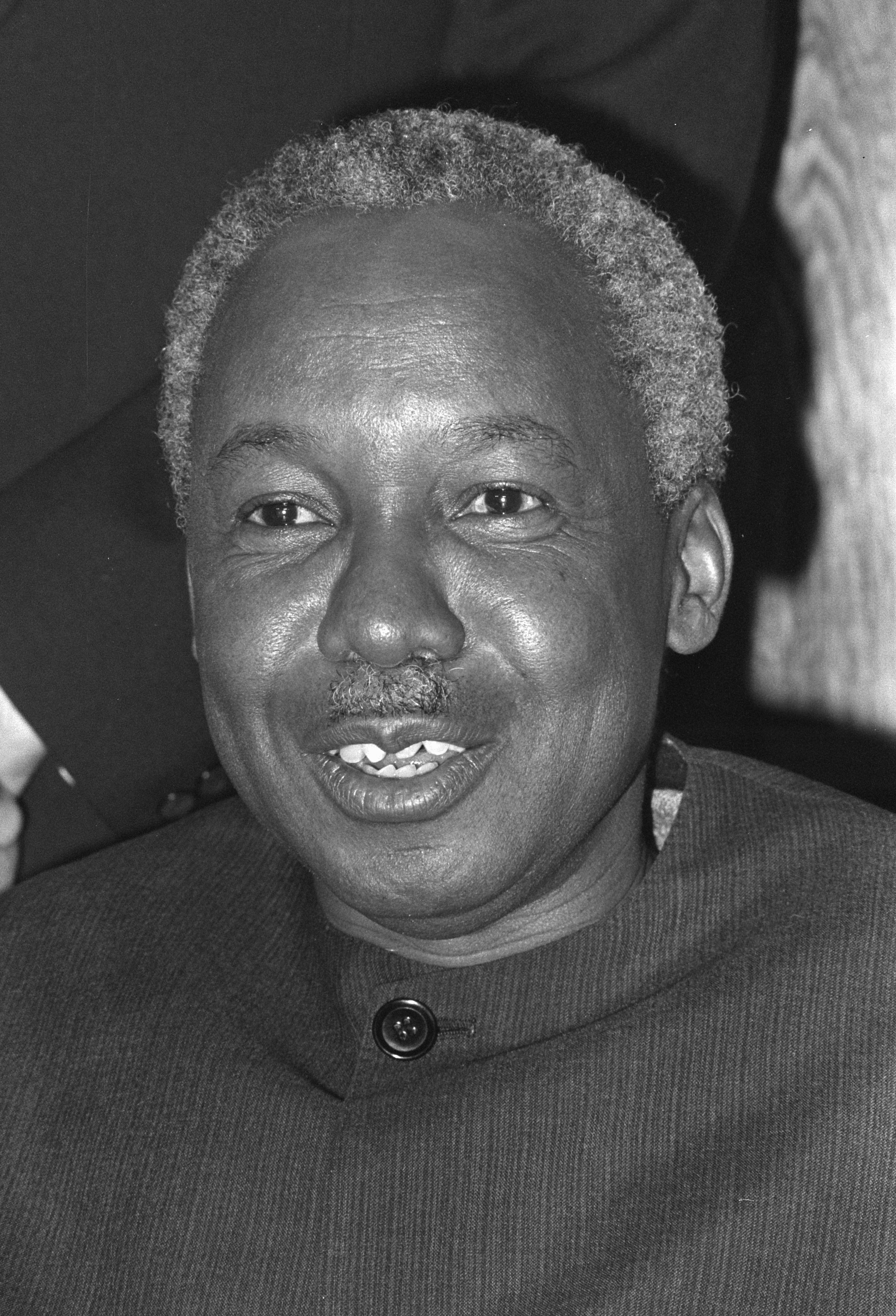
Julius Nyerere

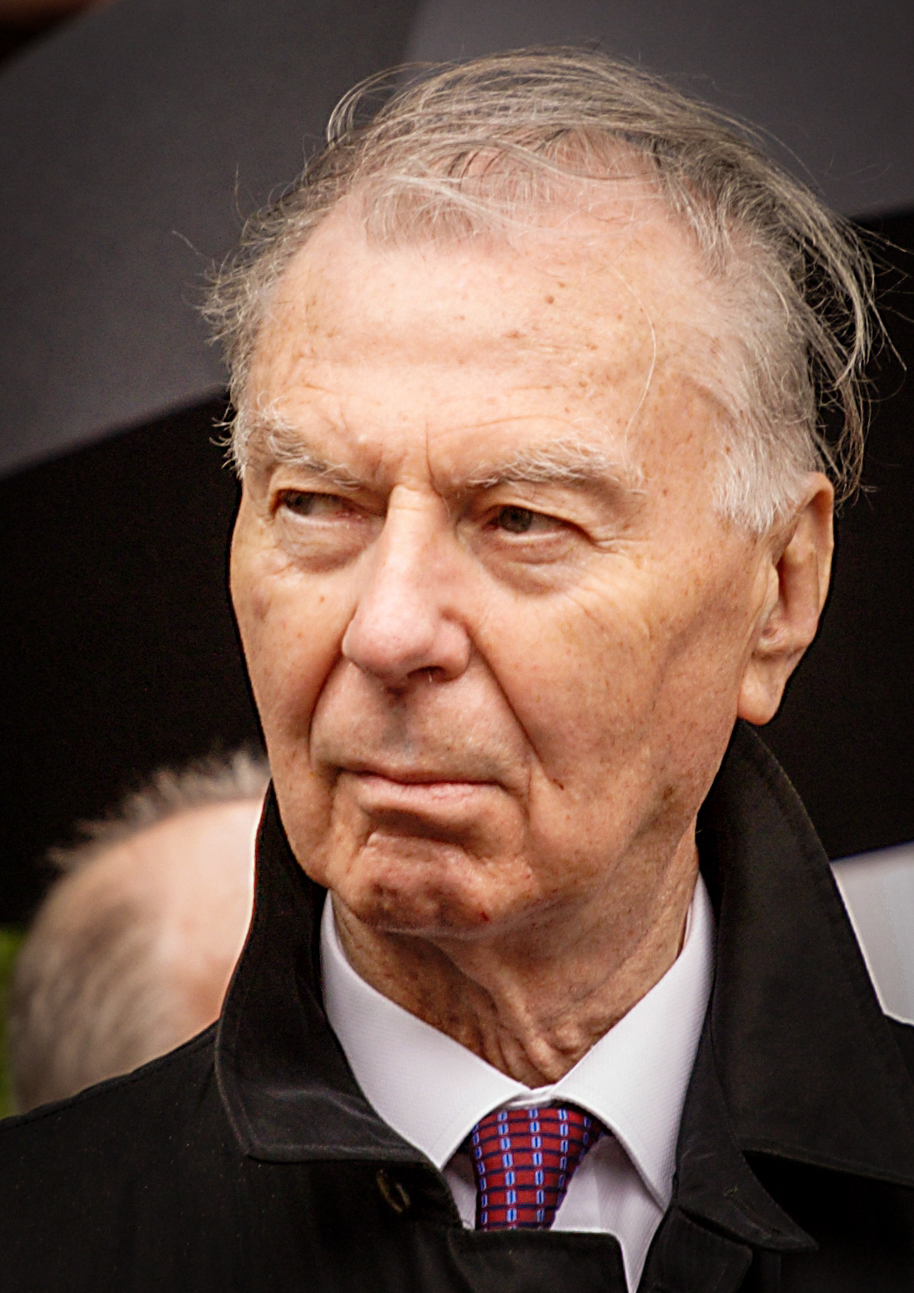
Leo Tindemans

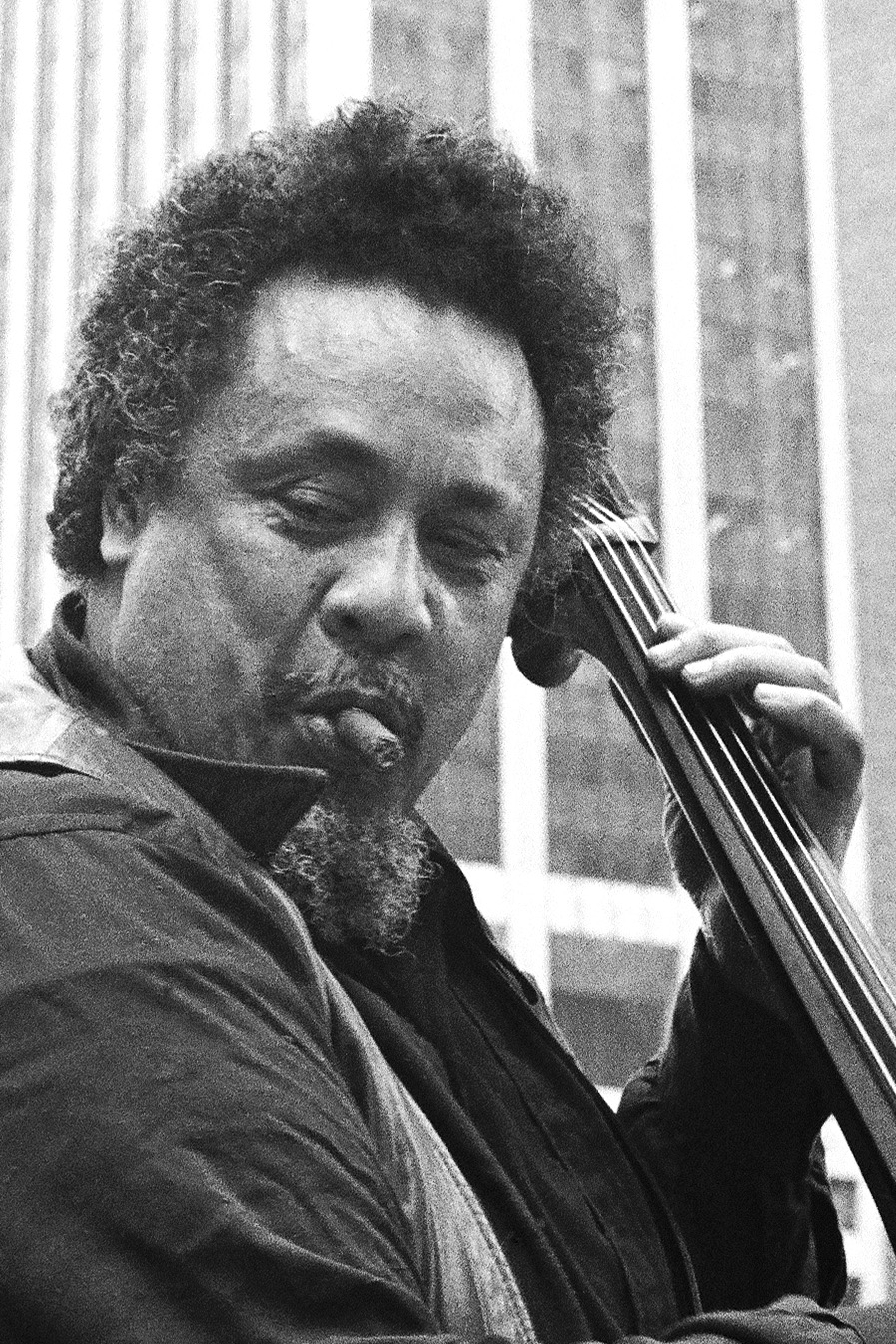
Charles Mingus

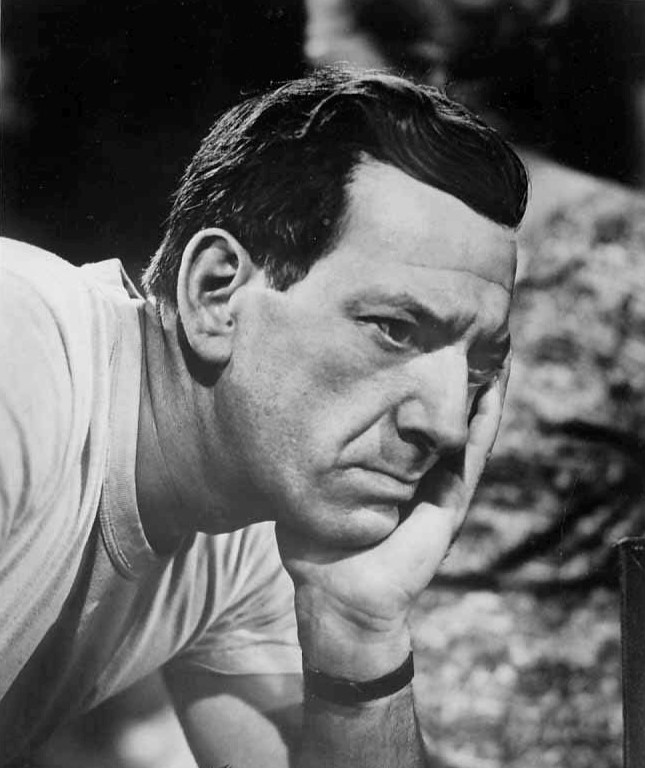
Jack Klugman

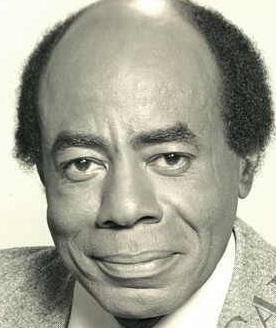
Roscoe Lee Browne

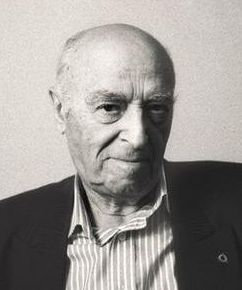
Vladimir Etush

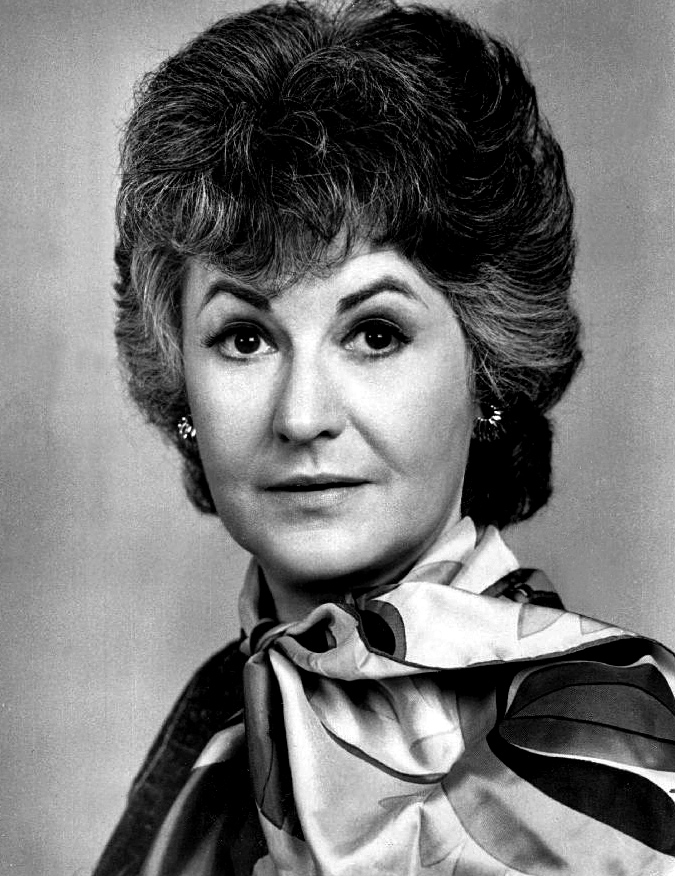
Bea Arthur

Franjo Tuđman

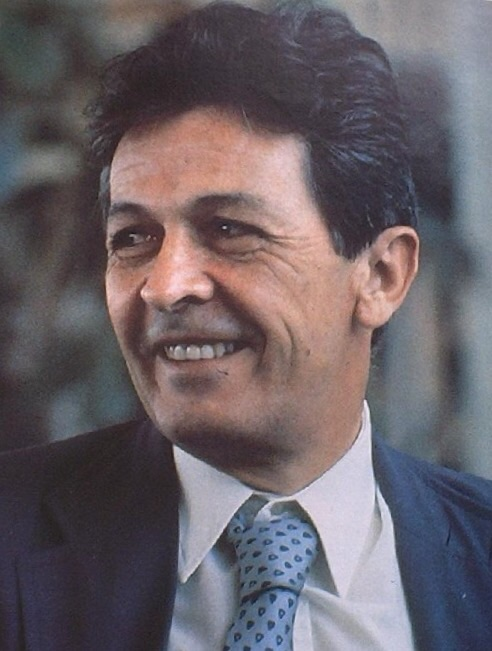
Enrico Berlinguer

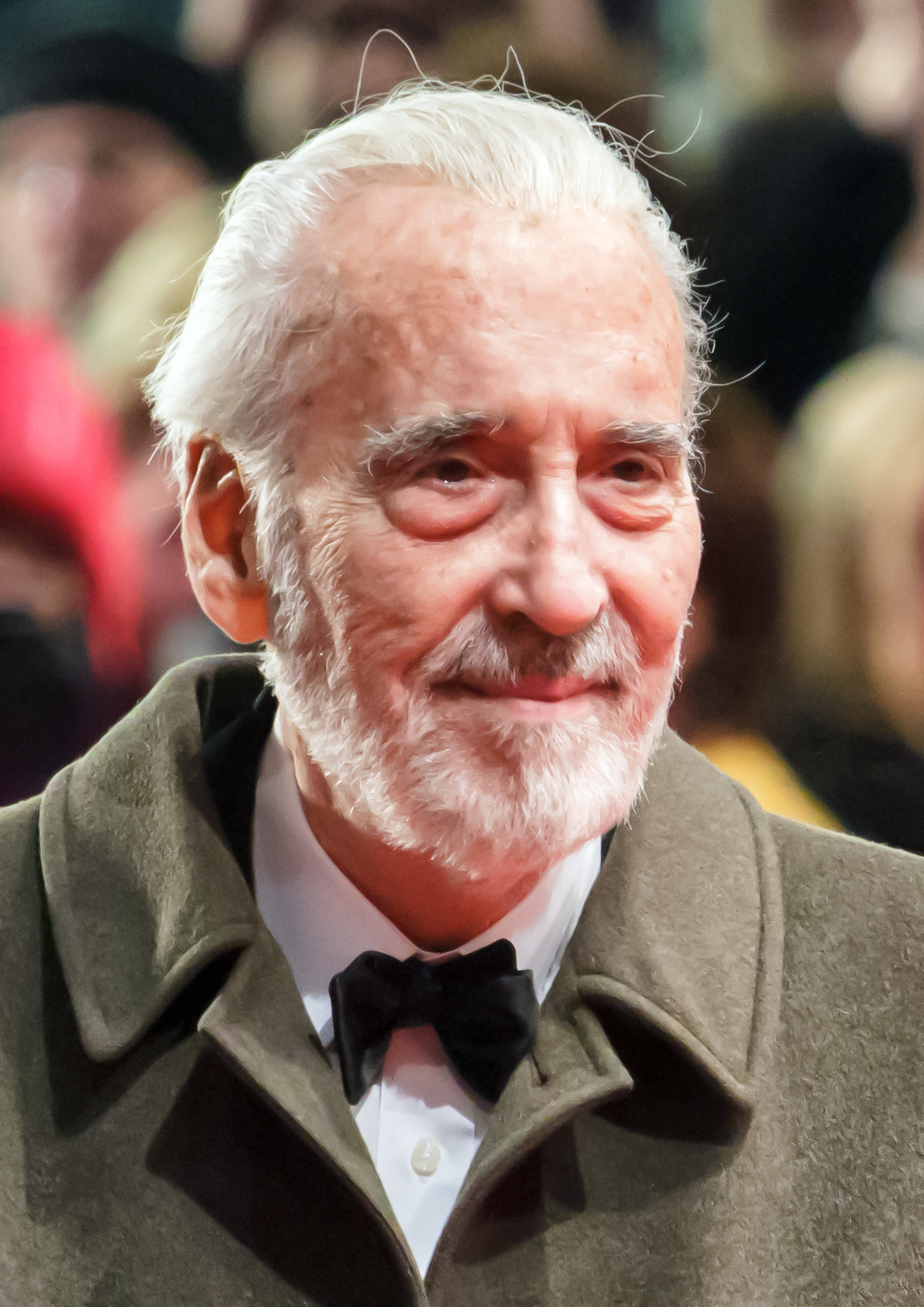
Sir Christopher Lee

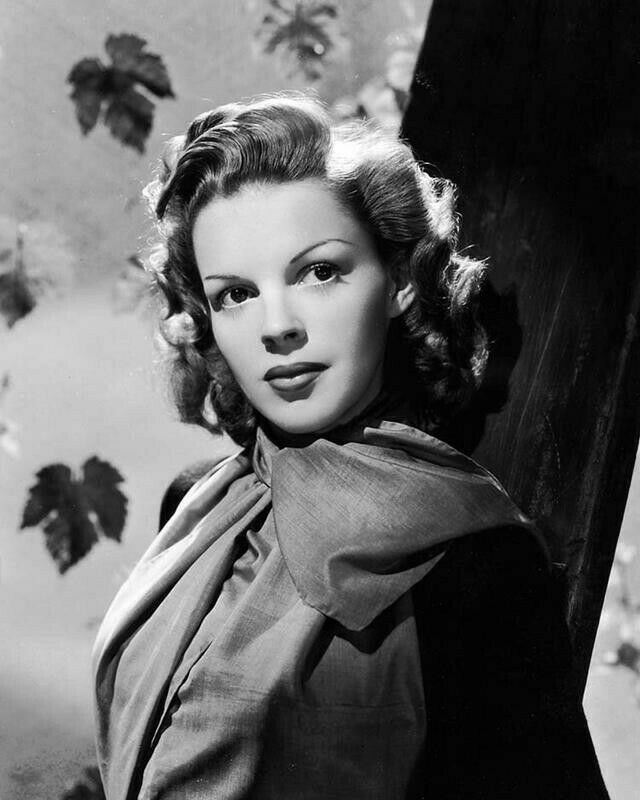
Judy Garland

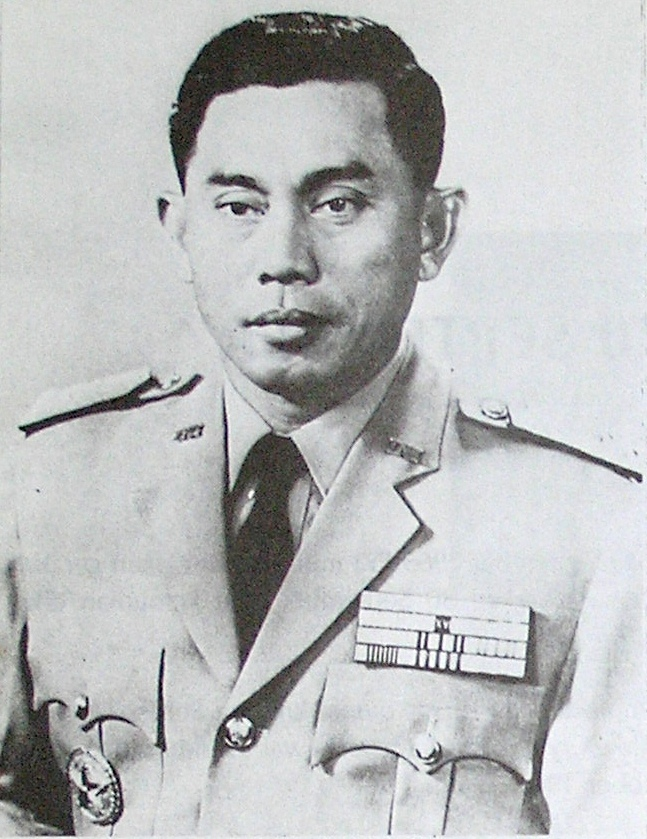
Ahmad Yani

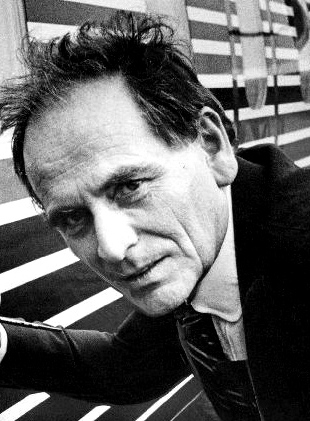
Pierre Cardin

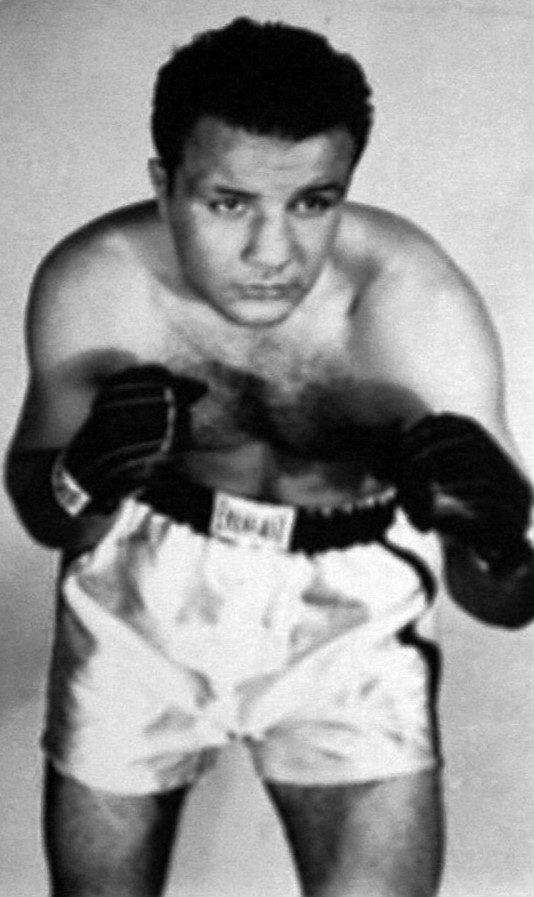
Jake LaMotta

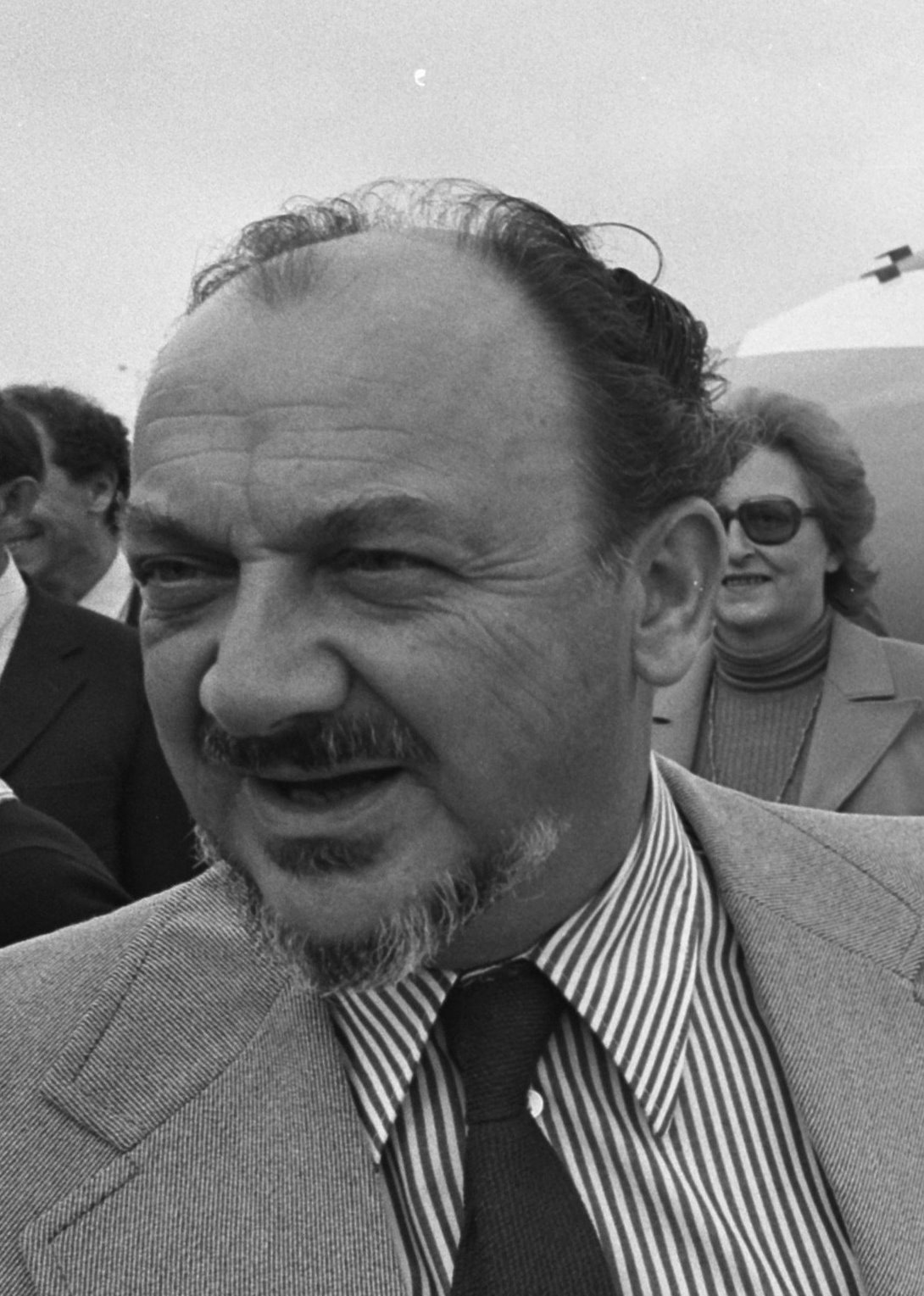
Anker Jørgensen

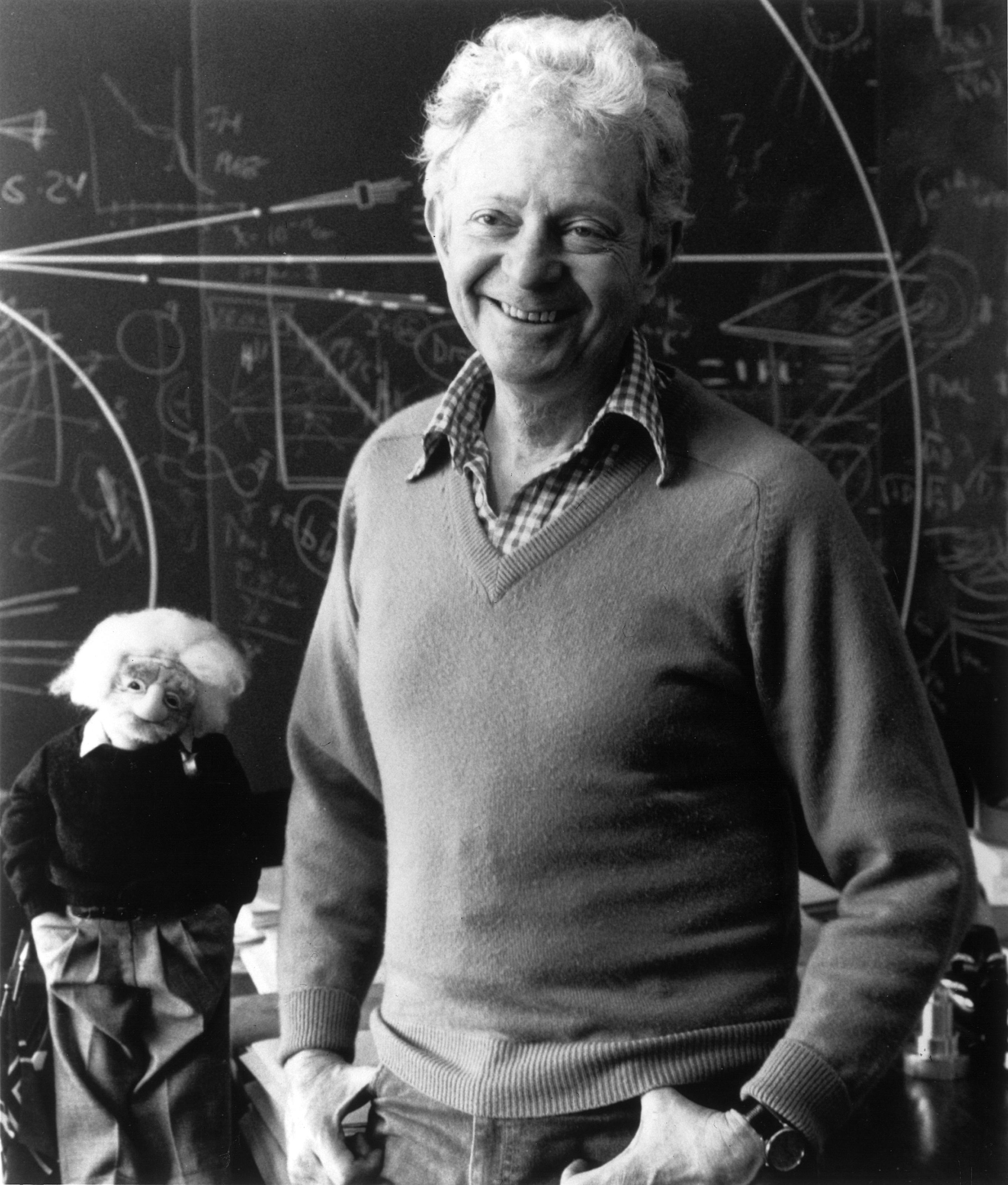
Leon M. Lederman

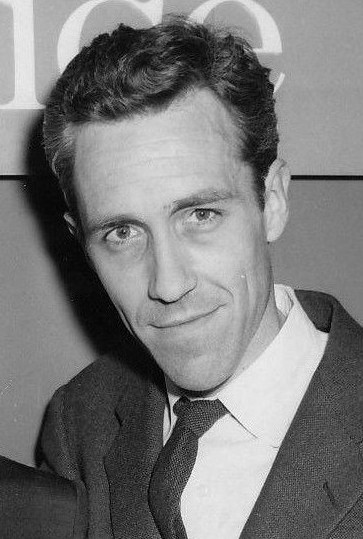
Jason Robards

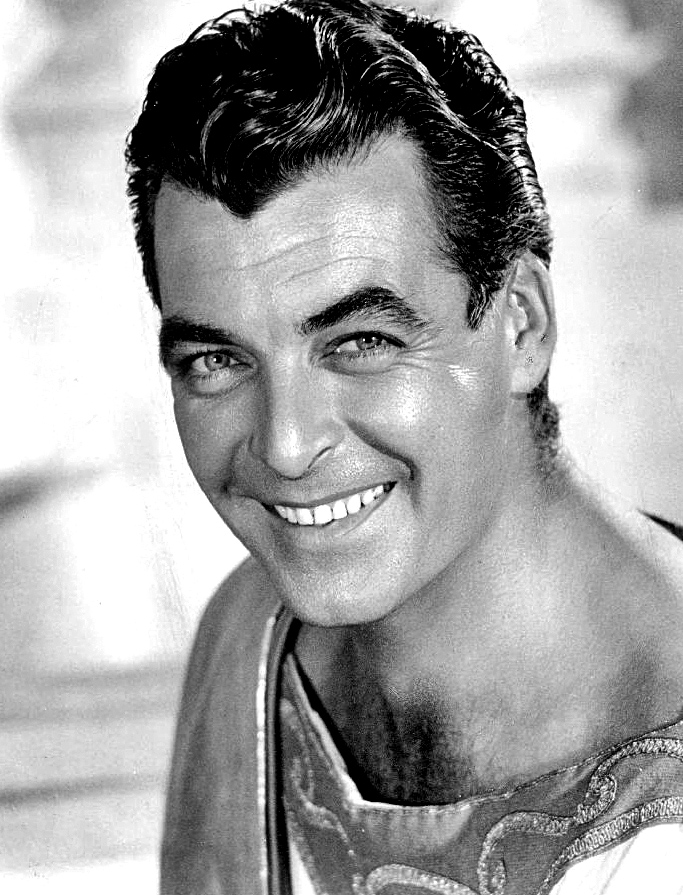
Rory Calhoun

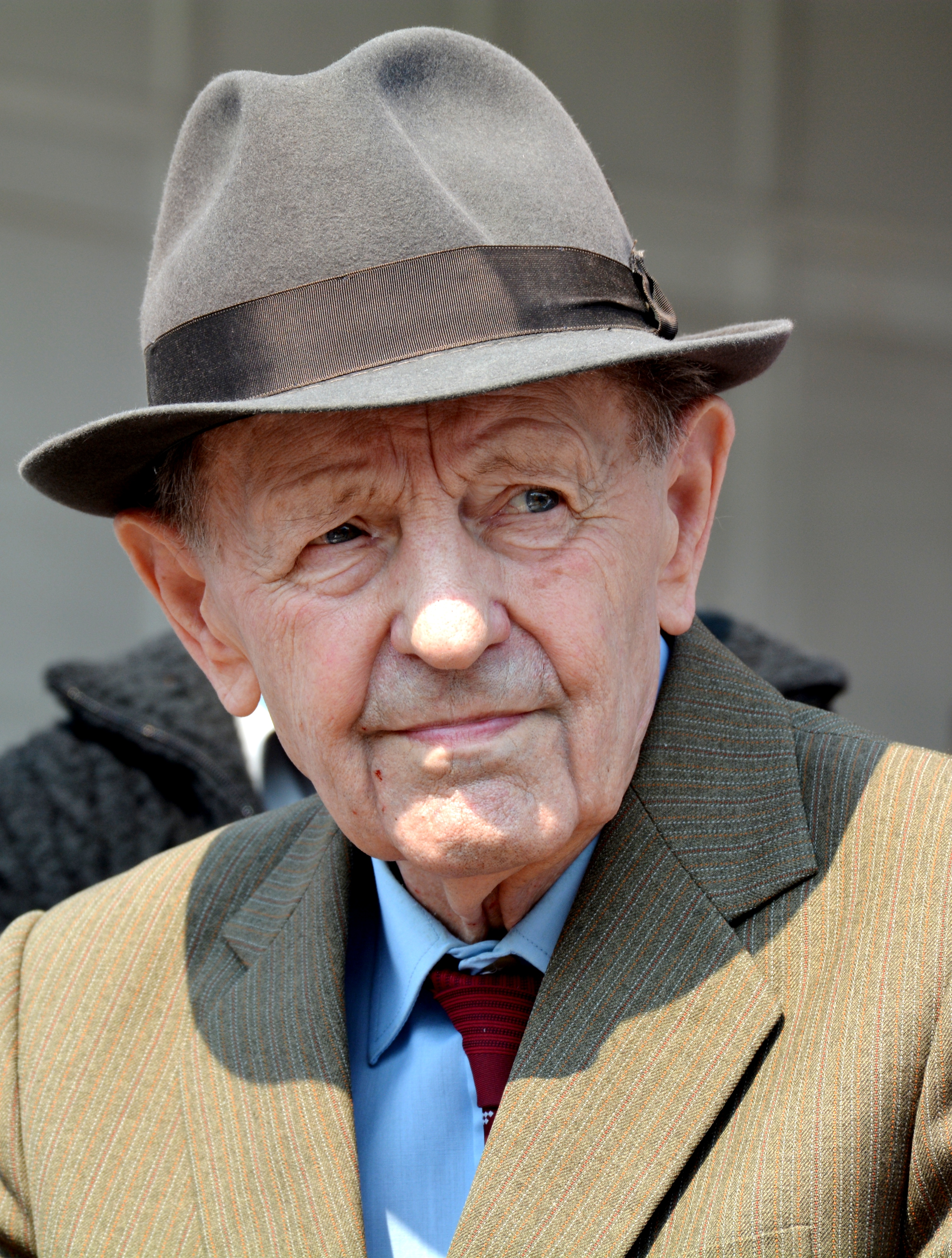
Miloš Jakeš

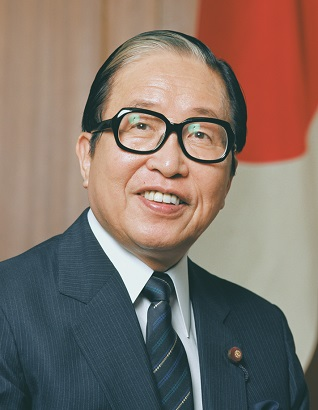
Sōsuke Uno

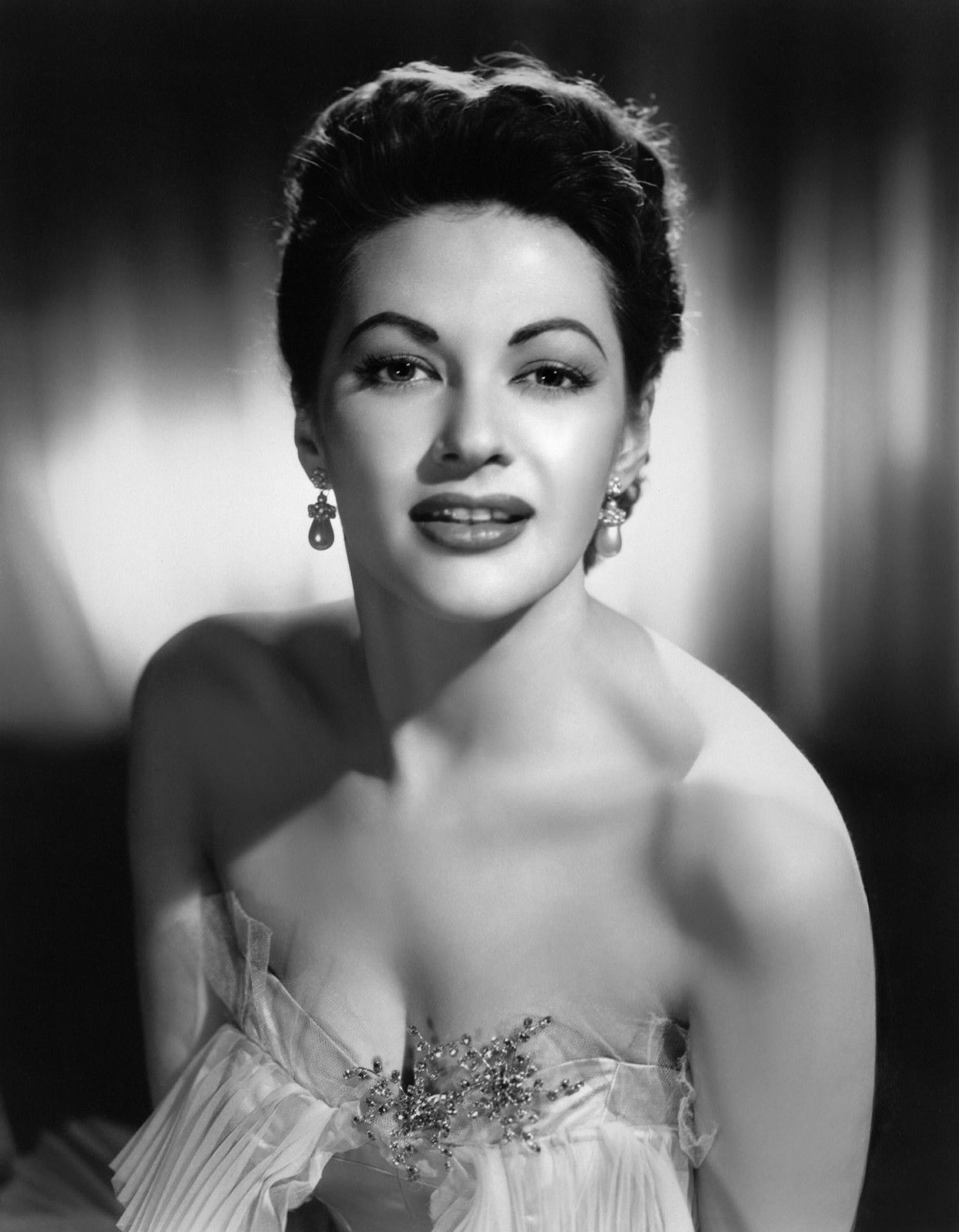
Yvonne De Carlo

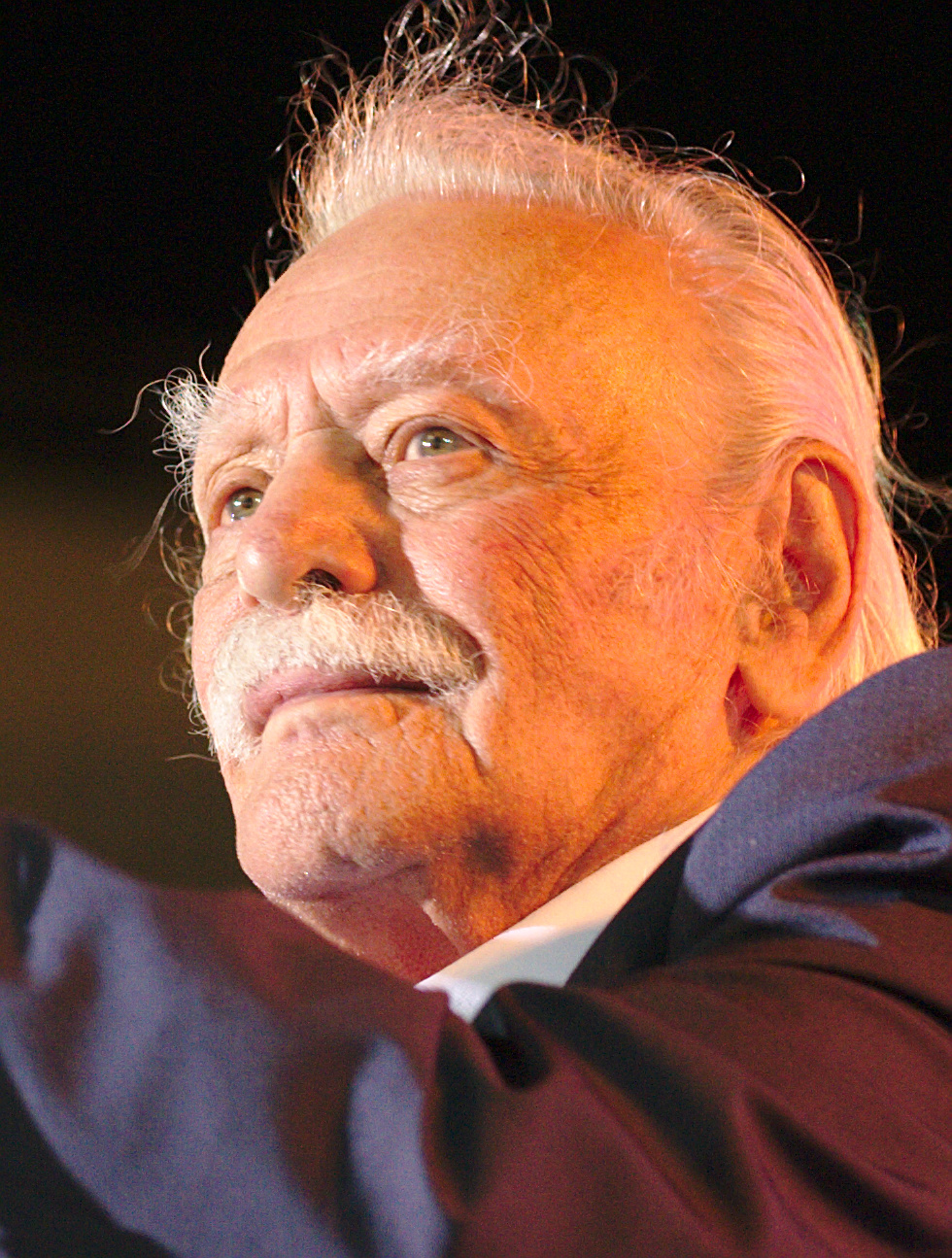
Manolis Glezos

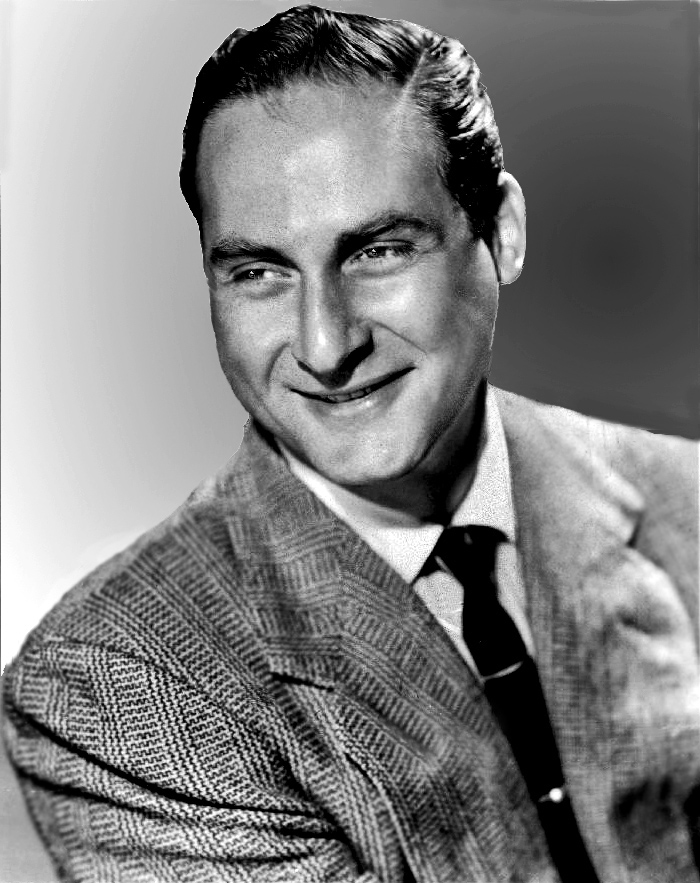
Sid Caesar

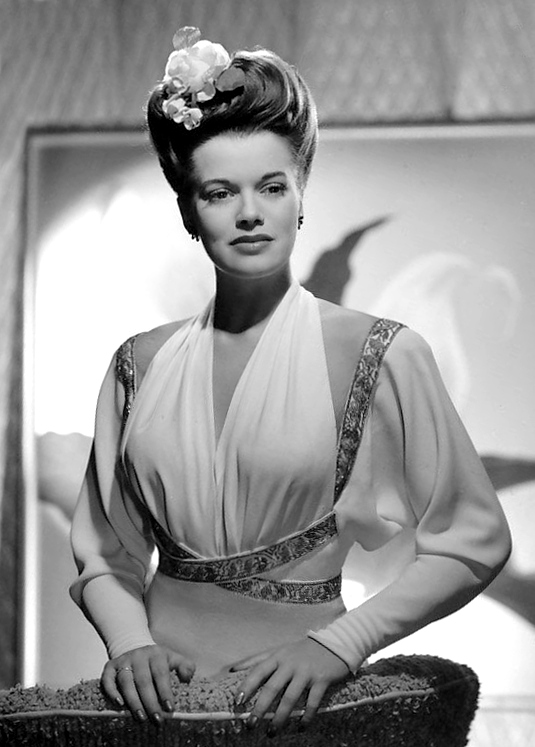
Janis Paige

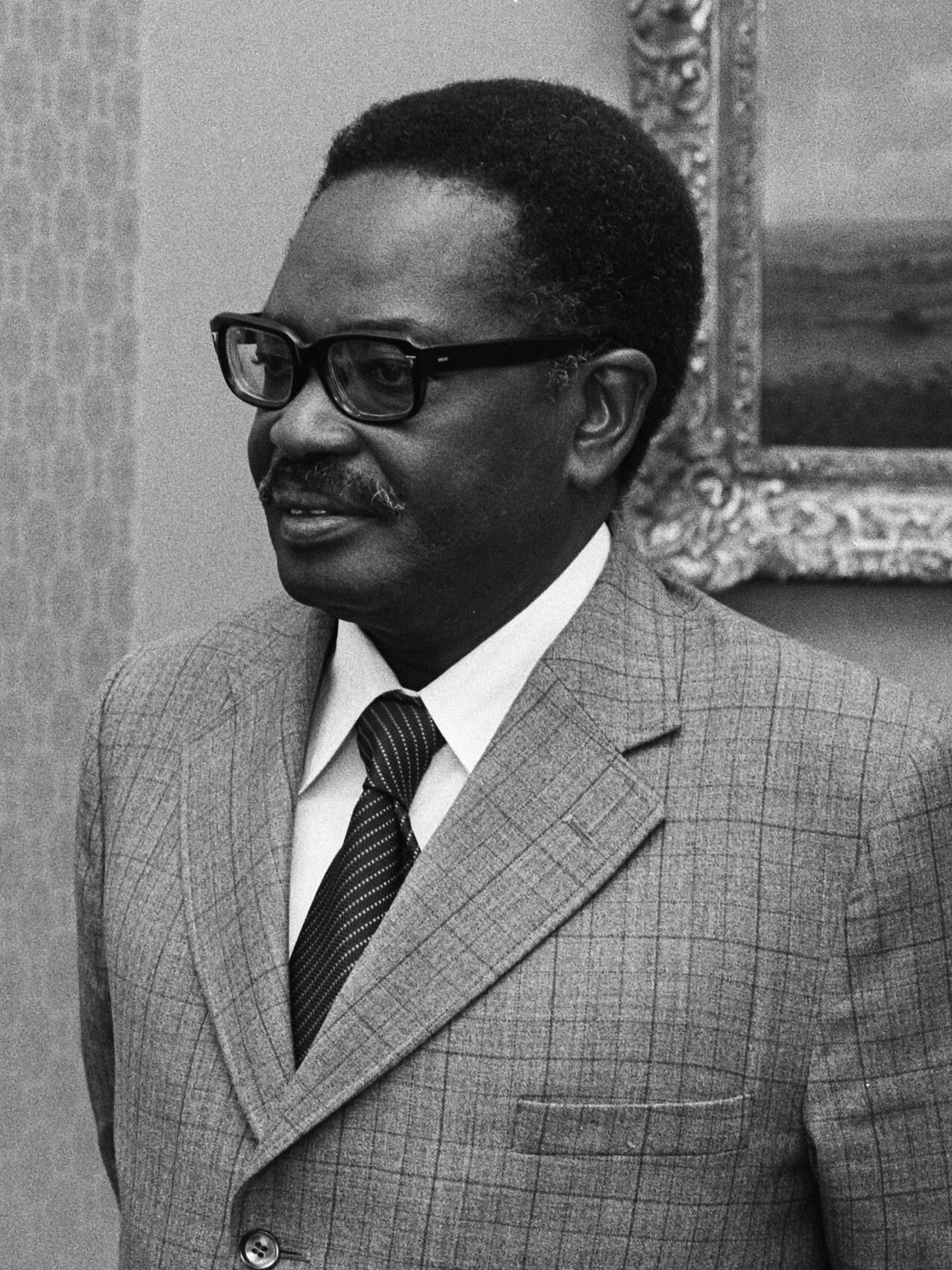
Agostinho Neto

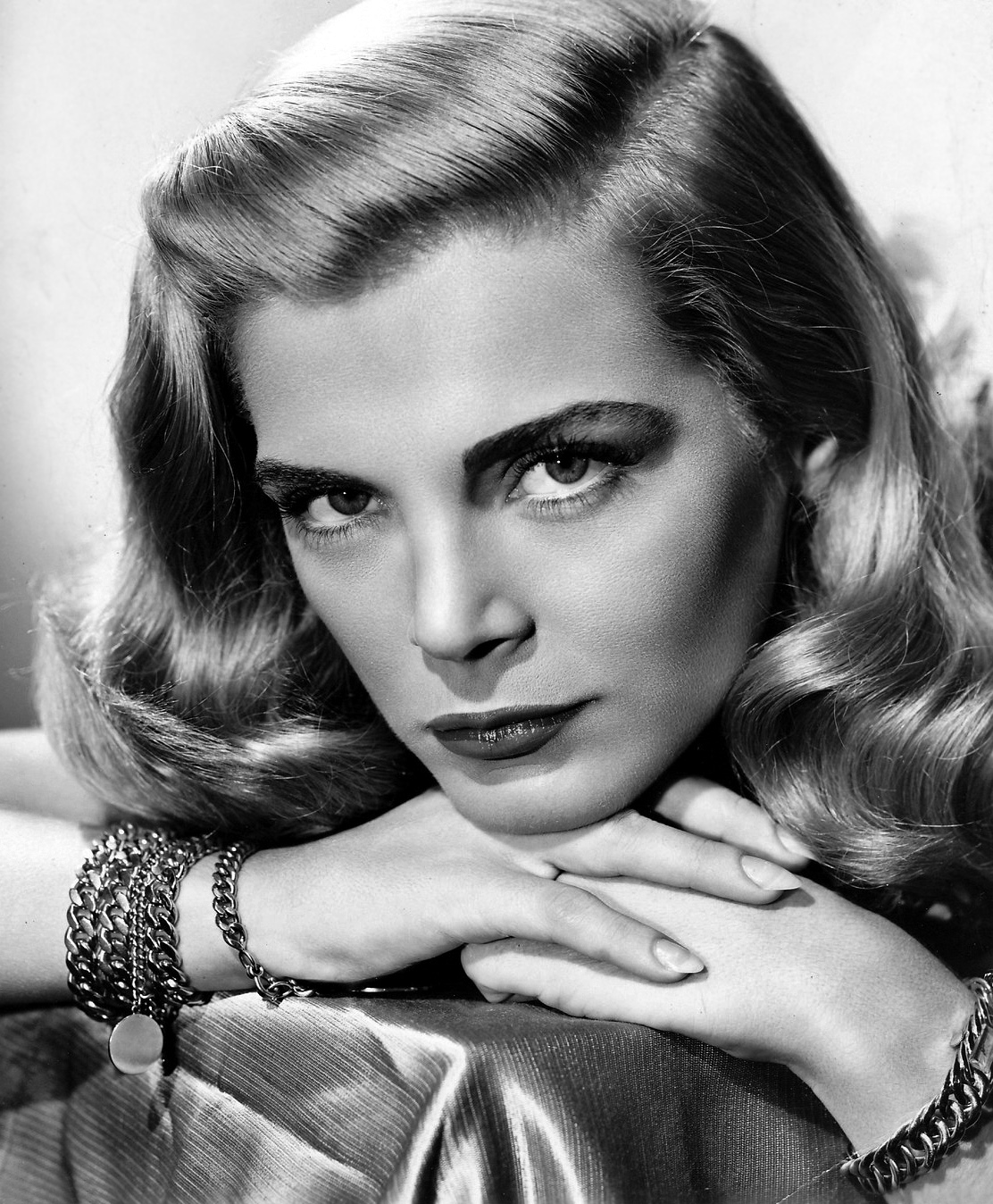
Lizabeth Scott

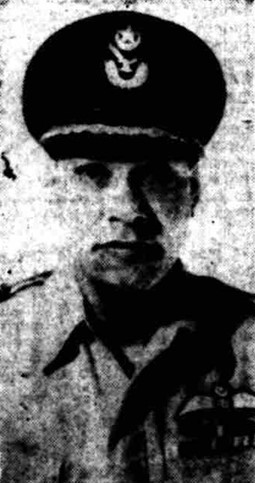
Eric G. Hall

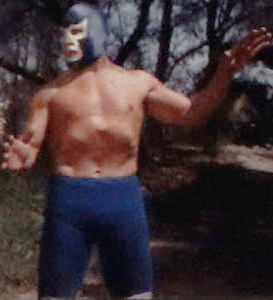
Blue Demon

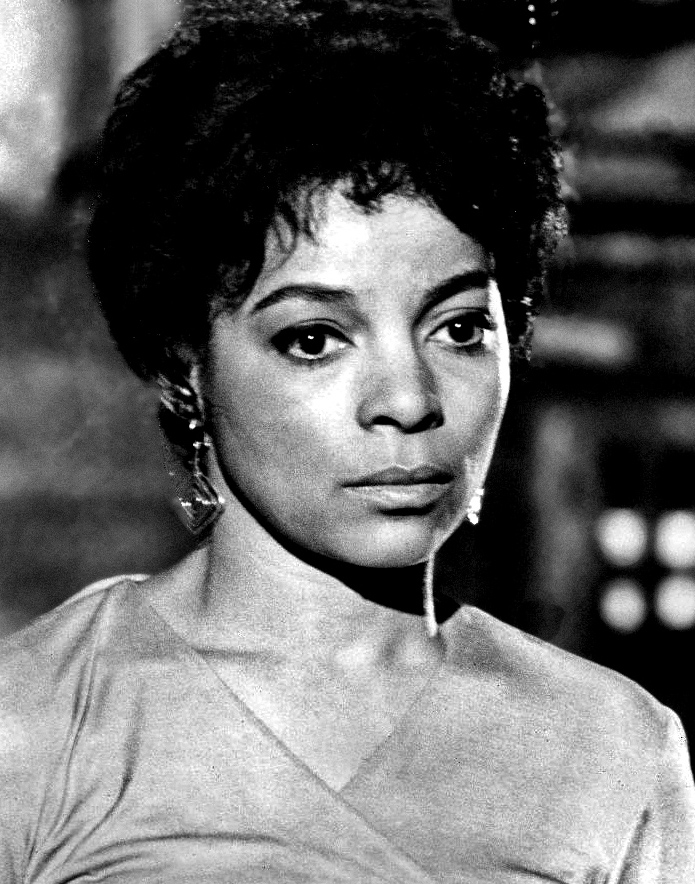
Ruby Dee

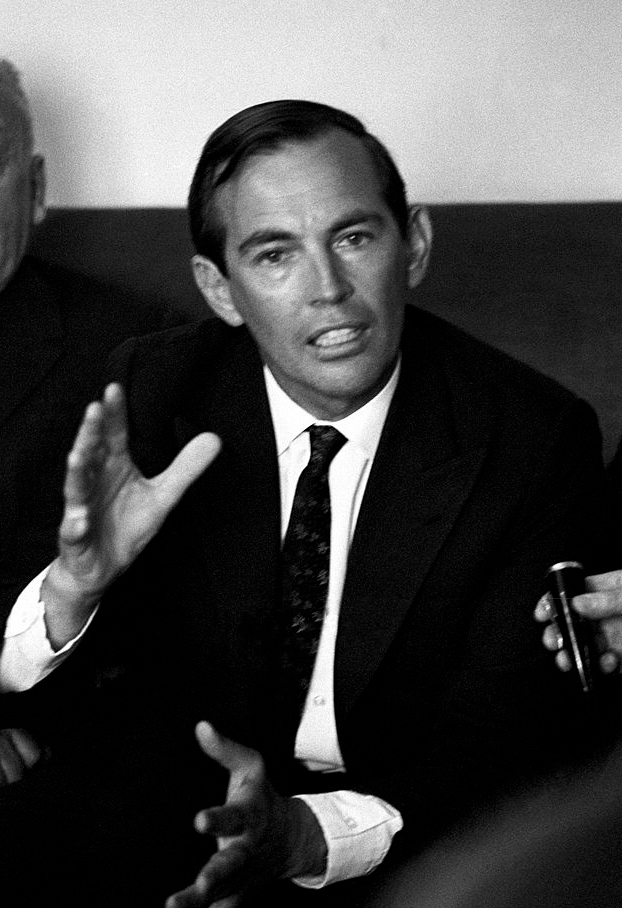
Christiaan Barnard

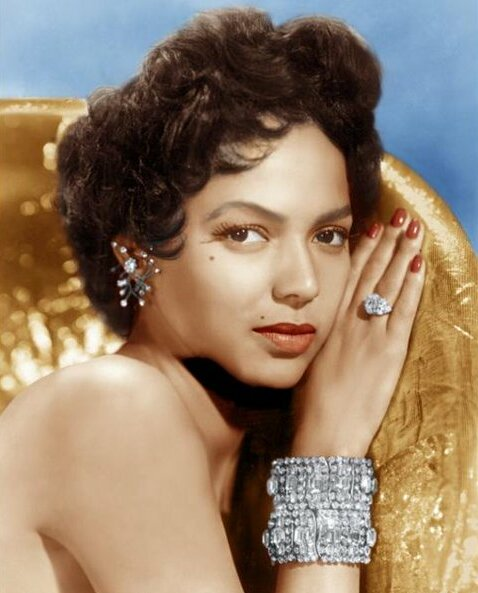
Dorothy Dandridge

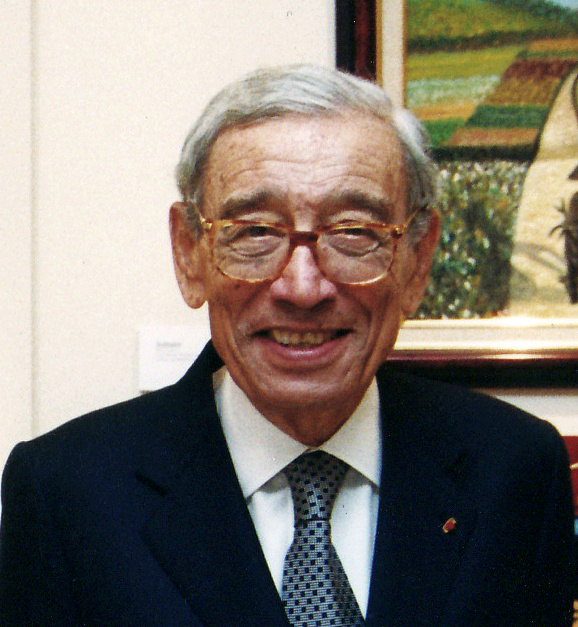
Boutros Boutros-Ghali

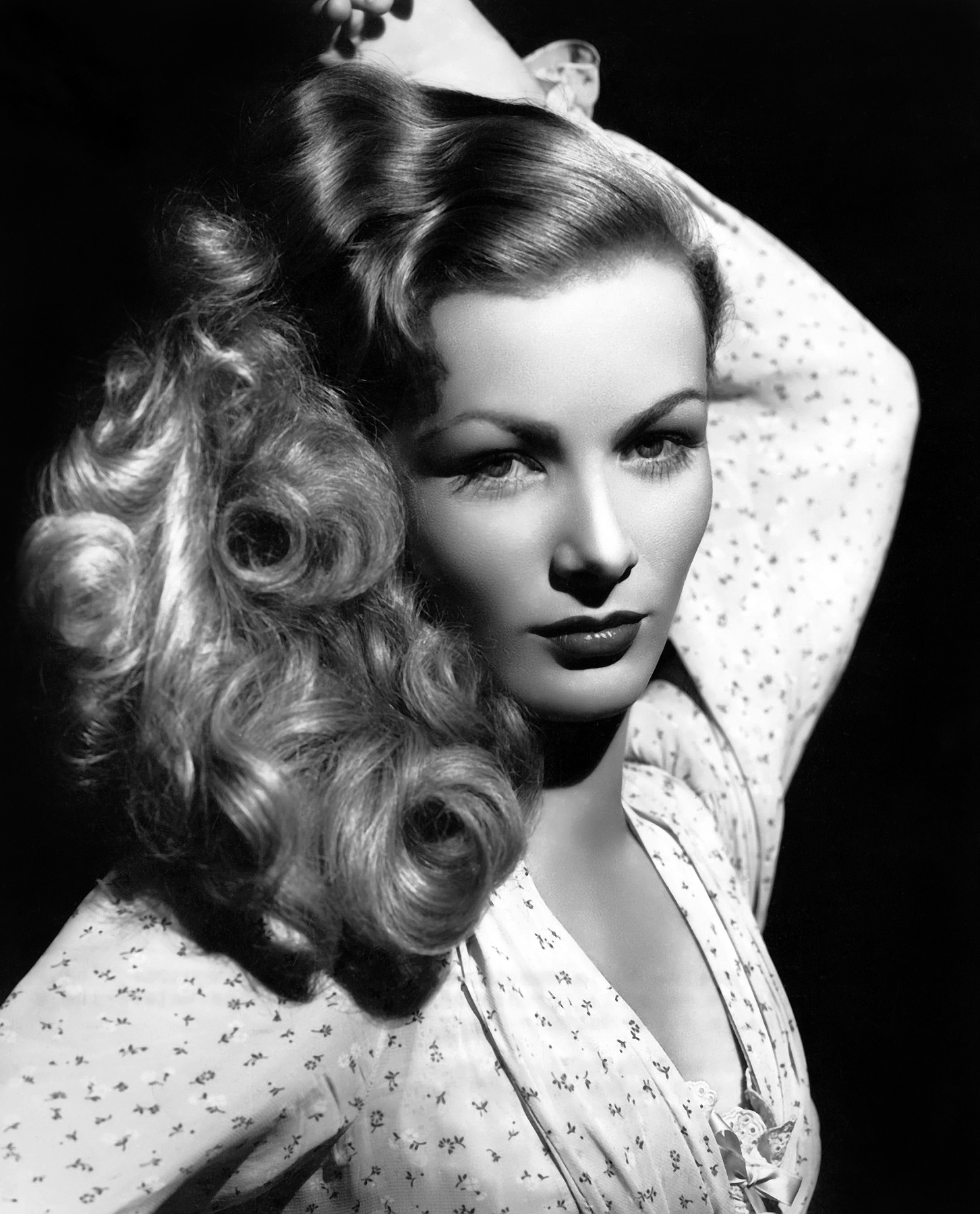
Veronica Lake

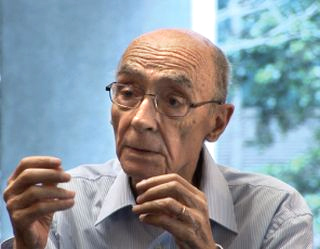
José Saramago

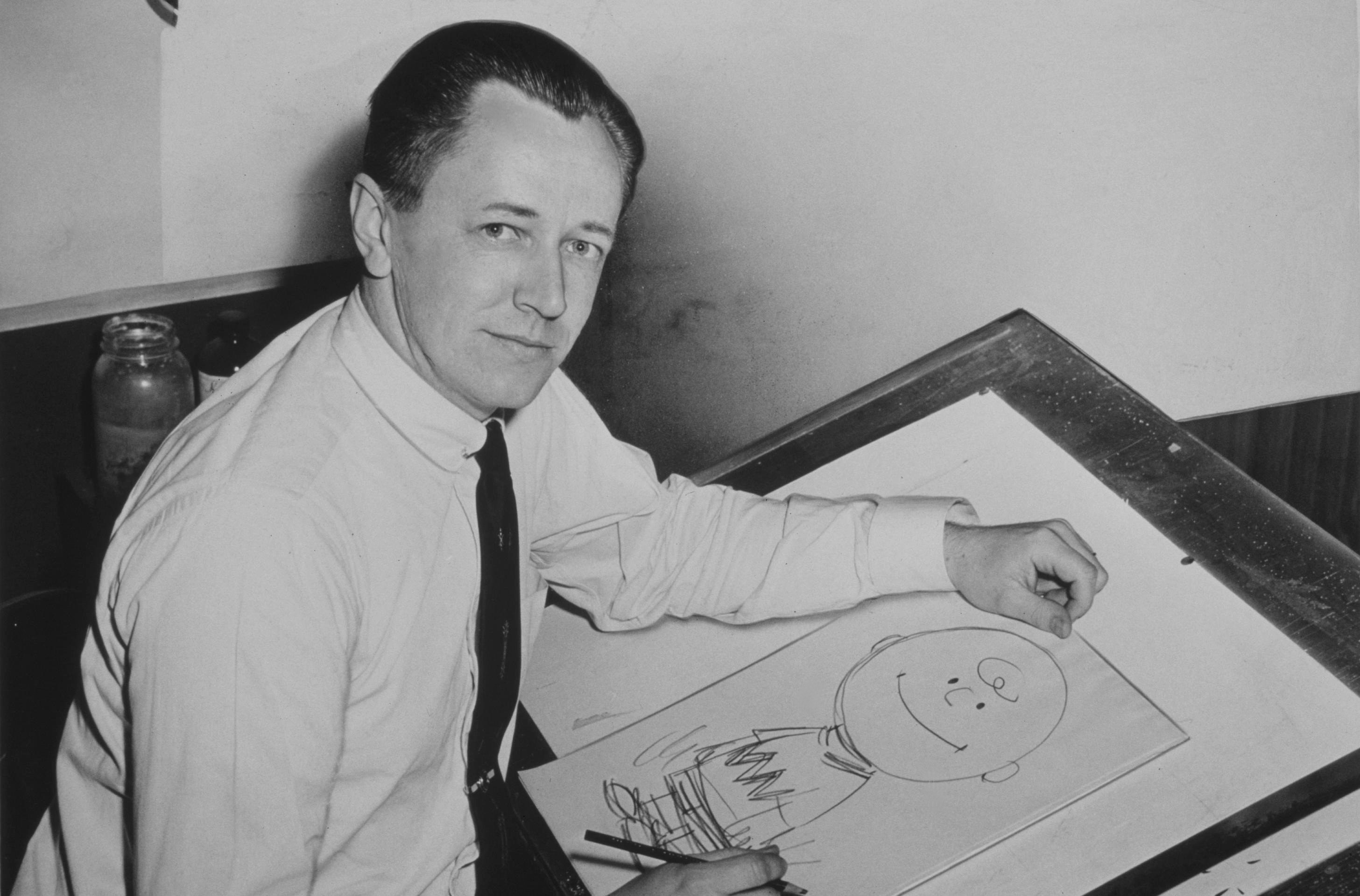
Charles M. Schulz

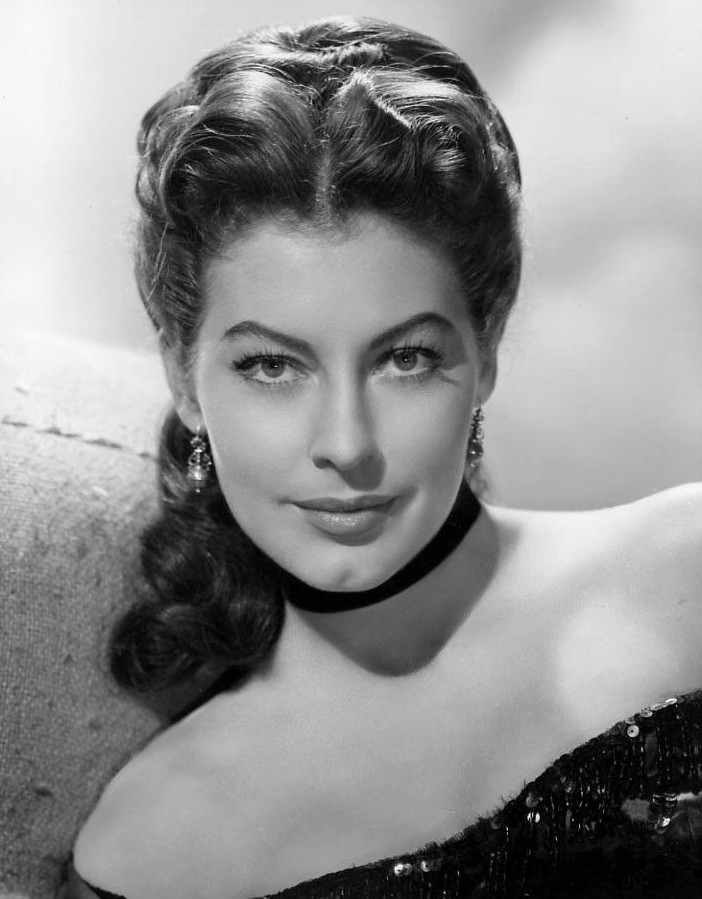
Ava Gardner

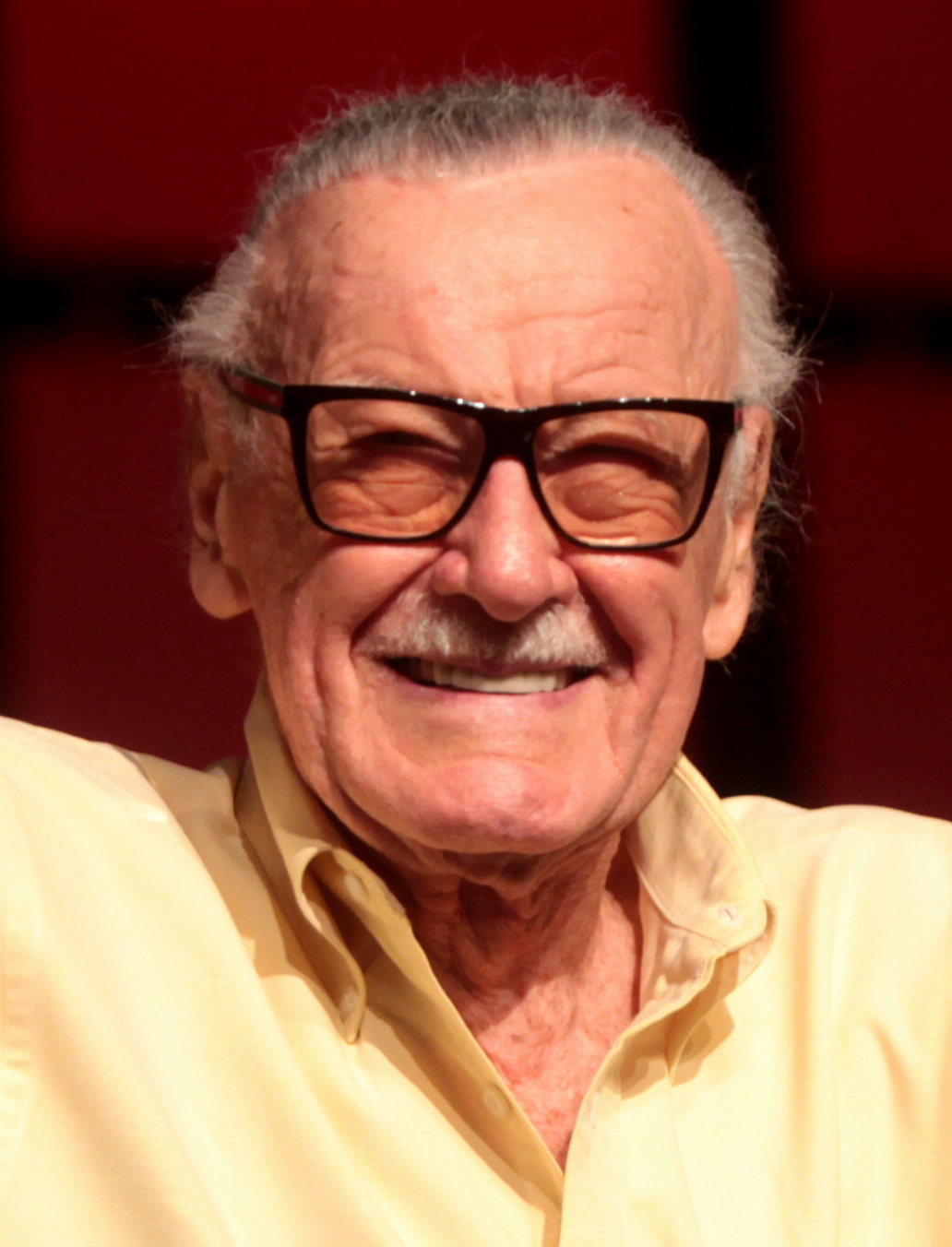
Stan Lee

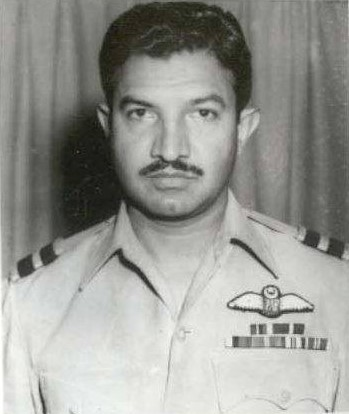
Masroor Hosain

=== January ===
- January 1
  - Fritz Hollings, American politician (d. 2019)
  - José de Jesús Sahagún de la Parra, Mexican Roman Catholic bishop
- January 2
  - Blaga Dimitrova, Bulgarian poet and politician (d. 2003)
  - María Fux, Argentine dancer and choreographer (d. 2023)
- January 4 – Karl-Erik Nilsson, Swedish wrestler (d. 2017)
- January 8 – Jan Nieuwenhuys, Dutch painter (d. 1986)
- January 9
  - Har Gobind Khorana, Indian biochemist, recipient of the Nobel Prize in Physiology or Medicine (d. 2011)
  - Ahmed Sékou Touré, Guinean politician, President of Guinea (1958–1984) (d. 1984)
- January 12 – Tadeusz Żychiewicz, Polish journalist, art historian and publicist (d. 1994)
- January 13 – Albert Lamorisse, French film director (d. 1970)
- January 14 – Guy Stern, German literary scholar (d. 2023)
- January 16 – Ernesto Bonino, Italian singer (d. 2008)
- January 17
  - Luis Echeverría, 50th President of Mexico (d. 2022)
  - Nicholas Katzenbach, United States Attorney General (d. 2012)
  - Betty White, American actress, television personality and animal welfare activist (d. 2021)
- January 18 – Agathe Poschmann, German actress
- January 19 – Miguel Muñoz Mozún, former Spanish football midfielder and manager (d. 1990)
- January 20
  - Ray Anthony, American trumpet player, composer, bandleader and actor
  - Bhisadej Rajani, Thai prince (d. 2022)
- January 21 – Paul Scofield, English actor (d. 2008)
- January 22
  - Leonel Brizola, Brazilian politician (d. 2004)
  - Bill Waterhouse, Australian bookmaker, businessman and barrister (d. 2019)
- January 26 – Ellen Vogel, Dutch film and television actress (d. 2015)
- January 28 – Robert W. Holley, American biochemist, recipient of the Nobel Prize in Physiology or Medicine (d. 1993)
- January 29 – Gerda Steinhoff, German Nazi war criminal (d. 1946)
- January 31 – Joanne Dru, American actress (d. 1996)

=== February ===
- February 1 – Renata Tebaldi, Italian soprano (d. 2004)
- February 2
  - Robert Chef d'Hôtel, French athlete (d. 2019)
  - Juan Marichal, Spanish-Canarian historian, literary critic and essayist (d. 2010)
  - Stoyanka Mutafova, Bulgarian actress (d. 2019)
  - Induratana Paribatra, Thai royal (d. 2026)
- February 6
  - Patrick Macnee, British actor (d. 2015)
  - Denis Norden, British television, radio scriptwriter and personality (d. 2018)
  - Haskell Wexler, American cinematographer (d. 2015)
- February 7
  - Hattie Jacques, English actress (d. 1980)
  - Antonio Nardini, Italian historian and author (d. 2020)
- February 8
  - Yuri Averbakh, Russian chess player and author (d. 2022)
  - Audrey Meadows, American actress (d. 1996)
- February 9
  - Kathryn Grayson, American actress (d. 2010)
  - Jim Laker, British cricketer (d. 1986)
- February 10 – Árpád Göncz, President of Hungary (d. 2015)
- February 12 – Hussein Onn, third Prime Minister of Malaysia (d. 1990)
- February 13 – Gordon Tullock, American economist (d. 2014)
- February 15
  - John B. Anderson, American Congressman, presidential candidate (d. 2017)
  - Poul Thomsen, Danish actor (d. 1988)
- February 16 – Frédéric Rossif, French film, television director (d. 1990)
- February 18
  - Helen Gurley Brown, American editor and publisher (d. 2012)
  - Eric Gairy, 1st Prime Minister of Grenada (d. 1997)
- February 22 – Mohd Hamdan Abdullah, Malaysian politician (d. 1977)
- February 23 – Johnny Franz, English record producer (d. 1977)
- February 24
  - Richard Hamilton, British painter (d. 2011)
  - Esperanza Magaz, Cuban-born Venezuelan actress (d. 2013)
- February 26
  - William Baumol, American economist (d. 2017)
  - Margaret Leighton, British actress (d. 1976)
  - Paatje Phefferkorn, Dutch martial artist (d. 2021)
  - Karl Aage Præst, Danish football player (d. 2011)

=== March ===
- March 1 – Yitzhak Rabin, Prime Minister of Israel, recipient of the Nobel Peace Prize (d. 1995)
- March 2 – Hilarion Capucci, Syrian Catholic bishop (d. 2017)
- March 3 – Nándor Hidegkuti, Hungarian footballer (d. 2002)
- March 4 – Dina Pathak, Gujarati actress (d. 2002)
- March 5 – Pier Paolo Pasolini, Italian film director (d. 1975)
- March 7 – Hans Ephraimson-Abt, German-born American businessperson and advocate for the victims of aviation accidents (d. 2013)
- March 8
  - Ralph H. Baer, German-born American inventor (d. 2014)
  - Cyd Charisse, American actress, dancer (d. 2008)
  - Yevgeny Matveyev, Soviet and Russian actor and film director (d. 2003)
  - Mizuki Shigeru, Japanese author (d. 2015)
- March 9 – Count Flemming of Rosenborg (d. 2002)
- March 11 – Abdul Razak Hussein, second Prime Minister of Malaysia (d. 1976)
- March 12 – Jack Kerouac, American author (d. 1969)
- March 14 – China Zorrilla, Uruguayan actress, director and producer (d. 2014)
- March 15 – Karl-Otto Apel, German philosopher (d. 2017)
- March 16 – Harding Lemay, American television scriptwriter, playwright (d. 2018)
- March 18
  - Egon Bahr, German politician (d. 2015)
  - Karl Kordesch, Austrian-American inventor (d. 2011)
  - Fred Shuttlesworth, American activist, co-founded the Southern Christian Leadership Conference (died 2011)
- March 19 – Hiroo Onoda, Japanese officer, WWII holdout (d. 2014)
- March 20 – Carl Reiner, American film director, producer, actor, and comedian (d. 2020)
- March 21 – Russ Meyer, American film director, producer (d. 2004)
- March 24 – Miguel Gustavo, Brazilian journalist and songwriter (d. 1972)
- March 28
  - Felice Chiusano, Italian singer (Quartetto Cetra) (d. 1990)
  - Joey Maxim, American boxer (d. 2001)
  - Prince Heinrich of Bavaria (d. 1958)
- March 31 – Richard Kiley, American actor and singer (d. 1999)

=== April ===
- April 1 – Saad el-Shazly, Egyptian military commander (d. 2011)
- April 3 – Doris Day, American actress and singer (d. 2019)
- April 4
  - Dionísio Azevedo, Brazilian television, theatre, and film actor, director, and writer (d. 1994)
  - Elmer Bernstein, American composer (d. 2004)
- April 5
  - Tom Finney, English footballer (d. 2014)
  - Gale Storm, American singer, actress (d. 2009)
- April 7 – Dircinha Batista, Brazilian actress and singer (d. 1999)
- April 8 – Carmen McRae, American jazz singer (d. 1994)
- April 13 – Julius Nyerere, 1st President of Tanzania (d. 1999)
- April 14 – Ali Akbar Khan, Indian musician (d. 2009)
- April 15 – Michael Ansara, Syrian-born American actor (d. 2013)
- April 16
  - Kingsley Amis, English novelist (d. 1995)
  - Leo Tindemans, 43rd Prime Minister of Belgium (d. 2014)
- April 18
  - Barbara Hale, American actress (d. 2017)
  - Paulo Nogueira Neto, Brazilian environmentalist (d. 2019)
  - Georges Dumitresco, Romanian-Swiss physician, painter, illustrator and poet (d. 2008)
- April 19 – Erich Hartmann, German World War II fighter pilot, highest-scoring ace in world history (d. 1993)
- April 21 – Alistair MacLean, Scottish writer (d. 1987)
- April 22
  - Charles Mingus, African-American musician (d. 1979)
  - Richard Diebenkorn, American painter (d. 1993)
- April 24
  - Susanna Agnelli, Italian politician (d. 2009)
  - Matti Lehtinen, Finnish opera singer (d. 2022)
- April 26
  - Keith McKenzie, Australian rules footballer, coach (d. 2018)
  - Jeanne Sauvé, Canadian journalist and politician, Governor General of Canada (d. 1993)
  - Margaret Scott, South African ballerina, choreographer (d. 2019)
- April 27
  - Martin Gray, Polish writer (d. 2016)
  - Jack Klugman, American actor (d. 2012)
- April 28 – Barbara Lüdemann, German politician (d. 1992)
- April 29 – Toots Thielemans, Belgian jazz musician (d. 2016)

=== May ===
- May 1 – Vitaly Popkov, Russian fighter ace (d. 2010)
- May 2 – Roscoe Lee Browne, African-American actor (d. 2007)
- May 4 – Eugenie Clark, American marine biologist (d. 2015)
- May 6 – Anna Elizabeth Botha, first wife of South African State President P. W. Botha (d. 1997)
- May 7 – Darren McGavin, American actor (d. 2006)
- May 8 – Yusof Rawa, Malaysian politician (d. 2000)
- May 9 – Rolands Kalniņš, Latvian film director (d. 2022)
- May 11 – Ameurfina Melencio-Herrera, Filipino Supreme Court jurist (d. 2020)
- May 13
  - Otl Aicher, German graphic artist (d. 1991)
  - Bea Arthur, American actress, comedian (d. 2009)
- May 14 – Franjo Tuđman, first President of Croatia (d. 1999)
- May 15 – Jakucho Setouchi, Japanese writer and Buddhist nun (d. 2021)
- May 18 – Gerda Boyesen, Norwegian-born body psychotherapist (d. 2005)
- May 22 – Quinn Martin, American television producer (d. 1987)
- May 25 – Enrico Berlinguer, Italian politician (d. 1984)
- May 27
  - Otto Carius, German tank commander (d. 2015)
  - Sir Christopher Lee, English actor (d. 2015)
- May 28 – Pompeyo Márquez, Venezuelan politician (d. 2017)
- May 29
  - Reginald Rodrigues, Indian field hockey player (d. 1995)
  - Iannis Xenakis, Greek composer (d. 2001)
- May 31 – Denholm Elliott, English actor (d. 1992)

=== June ===
- June 1 – Bibi Ferreira, Brazilian actress (d. 2019)
- June 3 – Alain Resnais, French film director (d. 2014)
- June 5 – Sheila Sim, English actress (d. 2016)
- June 7 – Selma van de Perre, Dutch–British resistance fighter and Holocaust survivor (d. 2025)
- June 9 – Hein Eersel, Surinamese linguist and cultural researcher (d. 2022)
- June 10 – Judy Garland, American singer, actress (d. 1969)
- June 11 – Tibor Baranski, Hungarian-American educator (d. 2019)
- June 12 – Margherita Hack, Italian astrophysicist (d. 2013)
- June 14 – Kevin Roche, Irish-American architect (d. 2019)
- June 18 – Claude Helffer, French pianist (d. 2004)
- June 19
  - Aage Bohr, Danish physicist, Nobel Prize laureate (d. 2009)
  - Ahmad Yani, Indonesian general (d. 1965)
- June 22 – Mona Lisa, Filipino actress (d. 2019)
- June 23 – Wu Yingyin, Chinese singer (d. 2009)
- June 24 – Tata Giacobetti, Italian singer, lyricist (d. 1988)
- June 25 – Sita bint Fahd Al Damir, Saudi princess (d. 2012)
- June 26 – Eleanor Parker, American actress (d. 2013)
- June 29 – Vasko Popa, Yugoslavian poet (d. 1991)

=== July ===
- July 1 – Mordechai Bibi, Israeli politician (d. 2023)
- July 2
  - Pierre Cardin, Italian-born French fashion designer (d. 2020)
  - Paula Valenska, Czech actress (d. 1994)
- July 3
  - Guillaume Cornelis van Beverloo (Corneille), Dutch painter (d. 2010)
  - Viggo Rivad, Danish photographer (d. 2016)
  - Howie Schultz, American baseball and basketball player (d. 2009)
- July 5 – Doris Margaret Anderson, Canadian nutritionist and senator (d. 2022)
- July 7
  - Francis Jeanson, French philosopher (d. 2009)
  - P. Gopinathan Nair, Indian social worker (d. 2022)
- July 10
  - Petar Kovachev, Bulgarian cross country skier
  - Jake LaMotta, American boxer (d. 2017)
  - Herb McKenley, Jamaican Olympic sprinter (d. 2007)
- July 13
  - Helmy Afify Abd El-Bar, Egyptian military commander (d. 2011)
  - Anker Jørgensen, Danish politician (d. 2016)
- July 14 – Käbi Laretei, Estonian and Swedish concert pianist (d. 2014)
- July 15
  - Ghulam Nabi Firaq, Kashmiri poet, writer and educationist (d. 2016)
  - B. Rajam Iyer, South Indian Carnatic singer (d. 2009)
  - Leon M. Lederman, American physicist, Nobel Prize laureate (d. 2018)
  - Dottie Frazier, American scuba diver (d. 2022)
- July 16 – Anatoli Levitin, Soviet Russian painter, art educator (d. 2018)
- July 17 – Tetsurō Tamba, Japanese actor (d. 2006)
- July 18
  - Thomas Kuhn, American philosopher of science (d. 1996)
  - Hedy Stenuf, Austrian figure skater (d. 2010)
- July 19
  - George McGovern, American politician, historian and author (d. 2012)
  - Tuanku Jaafar ibni Almarhum Tuanku Abdul Rahman, King of Malaysia (d. 2008)
- July 21
  - Kay Starr, American jazz and pop singer (d. 2016)
  - Mollie Sugden, English comedy actress (d. 2009)
- July 25 – John B. Goodenough, German-American physicist, Nobel Prize laureate (d. 2023)
- July 26
  - Blake Edwards, American film director (d. 2010)
  - Jason Robards, American actor (d. 2000)
- July 27
  - Adolfo Celi, Italian actor and director (d. 1986)
  - Norman Lear, American television writer and producer (d. 2023)
- July 28 – Hans Frauenfelder, Swiss-born American physicist and biophysicist (d. 2022)

=== August ===
- August 1 – Guan Xuezeng, Chinese actor (d. 2006)
- August 2 – Tupua Leupena, Tuvaluan politician (d. 1996)
- August 3 – Su Bai, Chinese archaeologist (d. 2018)
- August 4 – Janez Stanovnik, Slovenian economist and politician (d. 2020)
- August 8
  - Rory Calhoun, American actor (d. 1999)
  - Alberto Granado, Cuban writer and scientist (d. 2011)
- August 9 – Philip Larkin, English poet (d. 1985)
- August 11 – Sara Luzita, Spanish actress and dancer (d. 2025)
- August 12 – Miloš Jakeš, Czech politician (d. 2020)
- August 14 – Leslie Marr, English artist and racing driver (d. 2021)
- August 15
  - Lukas Foss, German-born composer (d. 2009)
  - Mehnga Singh, Indian high jumper
- August 22 – Micheline Presle, French actress (d. 2024)
- August 23
  - Tônia Carrero, Brazilian actress (d. 2018)
  - Inge Deutschkron, German-Israeli journalist and author (d. 2022)
  - Roland Dumas, French lawyer and politician (d. 2024)
- August 24
  - René Lévesque, 23rd Premier of Quebec (d. 1987)
  - Jules Wieme, member of De La Salle Brothers who developed agriculture in northern Rwanda (d. 2015)
  - Howard Zinn, American social activist and historian (d. 2010)
- August 25
  - Gloria Dea, American actress, dancer, and magician (d. 2023)
  - Ivry Gitlis, Israeli violinist (d. 2020)
- August 27 – Sōsuke Uno, Prime Minister of Japan (d. 1998)
- August 31 – André Baudry, French magazine editor (d. 2018)
- Date Unknown – Wu Nansheng, Chinese politician (d. 2018)

=== September ===
- September 1
  - Yvonne De Carlo, Canadian-born American actress, dancer and singer (d. 2007)
  - Vittorio Gassman, Italian actor, director (d. 2000)
- September 2 – Arthur Ashkin, American physicist and Nobel Prize laureate (d. 2020)
- September 6 – Adriano Moreira, Portuguese politician, Minister of the Overseas Provinces, President of the CDS – People's Party (d. 2022)
- September 7
  - David Croft, British writer, producer and actor (d. 2011)
  - Necdet Calp, Turkish civil servant, politician (d. 1998)
- September 8 – Sid Caesar, American actor, comedian (d. 2014)
- September 9
  - Solange Alexandre, French Resistance fighter, founded Resistance cell, participated in Liberation (d. 2026)
  - Hans Georg Dehmelt, German-born physicist, Nobel Prize laureate (d. 2017)
  - Manolis Glezos, Greek Resistance fighter (d. 2020)
  - Warwick Kerr, Brazilian geneticist (d. 2018)
- September 14 – Donald E. Allured, American handbell choir director, composer, and arranger (d. 2011)
- September 15
  - Jackie Cooper, American actor, director (d. 2011)
  - Gaetano Cozzi, Italian historian (d. 2001)
- September 16
  - Guy Hamilton, French-English director, screenwriter (d. 2016)
  - Janis Paige, American actress (d. 2024)
- September 17 – Agostinho Neto, 1st President of Angola (d. 1979)
- September 19
  - Emil Zátopek, Czech athlete (d. 2000)
  - Dana Zátopková, Czech Olympic javelin thrower (d. 2020)
- September 21 – Lee Hee-ho, First Lady of South Korea (d. 2019)
- September 24 – Asit Sen, Indian Bengali film director (d. 2001)
- September 25
  - Hammer DeRoburt, first President of Nauru (d. 1992)
  - Roger Etchegaray, French cardinal (d. 2019)
- September 28 – Jules Sedney, Prime Minister of Suriname (d. 2020)
- September 29
  - Noémi Ban, Hungarian-American lecturer, public speaker and Holocaust survivor (d. 2019)
  - Karl-Heinz Köpcke, German television presenter, news speaker (d. 1991)
  - Lizabeth Scott, American actress (d. 2015)

=== October ===
- October 1 – Yang Chen-Ning, Chinese physicist, Nobel Prize laureate (d. 2025)
- October 3 – Raffaele La Capria, Italian novelist and screenwriter (d. 2022)
- October 4 – Gianna Beretta Molla, Italian Roman Catholic pediatrician, saint (d. 1962)
- October 5 – José Froilán González, Argentine racing driver (Formula 1) (d. 2013)
- October 11 – Wolfgang Zuckermann, German-American harpsichord maker and sustainability activist (d. 2018)
- October 12
  - Eric G. Hall, Burmese-Pakistani Air Vice Marshal and World War II veteran (d. 1998)
  - Blue Demon, Mexican luchador (d. 2000)
- October 14 – Yumeji Tsukioka, Japanese actress (d. 2017)
- October 15 – Luigi Giussani, Italian Catholic priest (d. 2005)
- October 17 – Angel Wagenstein, Bulgarian screenwriter and author (d. 2023)
- October 19 - Ebrahim Golestan, Iranian filmmaker (d. 2023)
- October 23 – Coleen Gray, American actress (d. 2015)
- October 27
  - Poul Bundgaard, Danish actor, singer (d. 1998)
  - Ruby Dee, American actress, poet, activist, journalist and second wife of Ossie Davis (d. 2014)
  - Carlos Andrés Pérez, 55th President of Venezuela (d. 2010)
  - Michel Galabru, French actor (d. 2016)
- October 28 – Gershon Kingsley, German-American composer (d. 2019)
- October 30 – Iancu Țucărman, Romanian Holocaust survivor (d. 2021)
- October 31
  - Barbara Bel Geddes, American actress, children's book author (d. 2005)
  - András Hegedüs, 45th Prime Minister of Hungary (d. 1999)
  - Norodom Sihanouk, King of Cambodia (d. 2012)

=== November ===
- November 5 – María Isabel Rodríguez, Salvadorian physician, academic and government official
- November 8 – Christiaan Barnard, South African cardiac surgeon, heart transplant pioneer (d. 2001)
- November 9
  - Dorothy Dandridge, African-American actress (d. 1965)
  - Raymond Devos, French humorist (d. 2006)
- November 11
  - George Blake, né Behar, Dutch-born British double agent (d. 2020)
  - Kurt Vonnegut, American novelist (d. 2007)
- November 12
  - Ichiro Abe, Japanese judoka (d. 2022)
  - Kim Hunter, American actress (d. 2002)
- November 13 – Oskar Werner, Austrian actor (d. 1984)
- November 14
  - Boutros Boutros-Ghali, Egyptian Secretary-General of the United Nations (d. 2016)
  - Veronica Lake, American actress (d. 1973)
- November 16 – José Saramago, Portuguese author, Nobel Prize laureate (d. 2010)
- November 17 – Stanley Cohen, American physician, recipient of the Nobel Prize in Physiology or Medicine (d. 2020)
- November 18 – Luis Somoza Debayle, 26th President of Nicaragua (d. 1967)
- November 19 – Yuri Knorozov, Russian linguist, epigrapher (d. 1999)
- November 22 – Aksel Jacobsen Bogdanoff, Norwegian communist (d. 1971)
- November 23 – Võ Văn Kiệt, Vietnamese politician, statesman (d. 2008)
- November 24 – Stanford R. Ovshinsky, American inventor and scientist (d. 2012)
- November 26:
  - Charles M. Schulz, American cartoonist (d. 2000)
  - Richard James, British army officer and civil servant (d. 2008)
- November 27 – Nicholas Magallanes, Mexican-American principal dancer, charter member of the New York City Ballet (d. 1977)
- Date Unknown – Abdullahi Issa, Somali politician, 1st Prime Minister of Somalia (d. 1988)

=== December ===
- December 1 – Charles Gérard, French actor (d. 2019)
- December 4 – Gérard Philipe, French actor (d. 1959)
- December 8
  - Lucian Freud, German born painter (d. 2011)
  - Gerhard Löwenthal, German journalist (d. 2002)
- December 9 – Redd Foxx, African-American comedian and actor (d. 1991)
- December 10 – Edith Ballantyne, Czech-born Canadian peace activist (d. 2025)
- December 11
  - Frank Blaichman, Polish author (d. 2018)
  - Dilip Kumar, Indian actor (d. 2021)
  - Maila Nurmi, Finnish-American actress, television personality (d. 2008)
- December 12 – Christian Dotremont, Belgian painter, writer (d. 1979)
- December 14
  - Nikolay Basov, Russian physicist, Nobel Prize laureate (d. 2001)
  - Antonio Larreta, Uruguayan theatre actor, critic and writer (d. 2015)
- December 17 – Josiane Serre, French academic chemist, teacher, pioneer of quantum chemistry (d. 2004)
- December 18 – Carlos Altamirano, Chilean lawyer and socialist politician (d. 2019)
- December 21
  - Itubwa Amram, Nauruan pastor and politician (d. 1989)
  - Paul Winchell, American actor (d. 2005)
  - Cécile DeWitt-Morette, French mathematician and physicist (d. 2017)
- December 22 – Princess Elisabeth, Duchess of Hohenberg, Princess of Luxembourg (d. 2011)
- December 24
  - Ava Gardner, American actress (d. 1990)
  - Jonas Mekas, Lithuanian-American filmmaker and poet (d. 2019)
- December 28
  - Stan Lee, American comics creator (d. 2018)
  - Ramapada Chowdhury, Indian novelist and writer (d. 2018)
- December 29
  - William Gaddis, American writer (d. 1998)
  - Masroor Hosain, Pakistani aerobatic pilot (d. 1969)
- December 30
  - Boes Boestami, Indonesian actor (d. 1970)
  - Magín Díaz, Colombian musician and composer (d. 2017)
- December 31
- Tomas Balduino, Brazilian bishop (d. 2014)

== Deaths ==
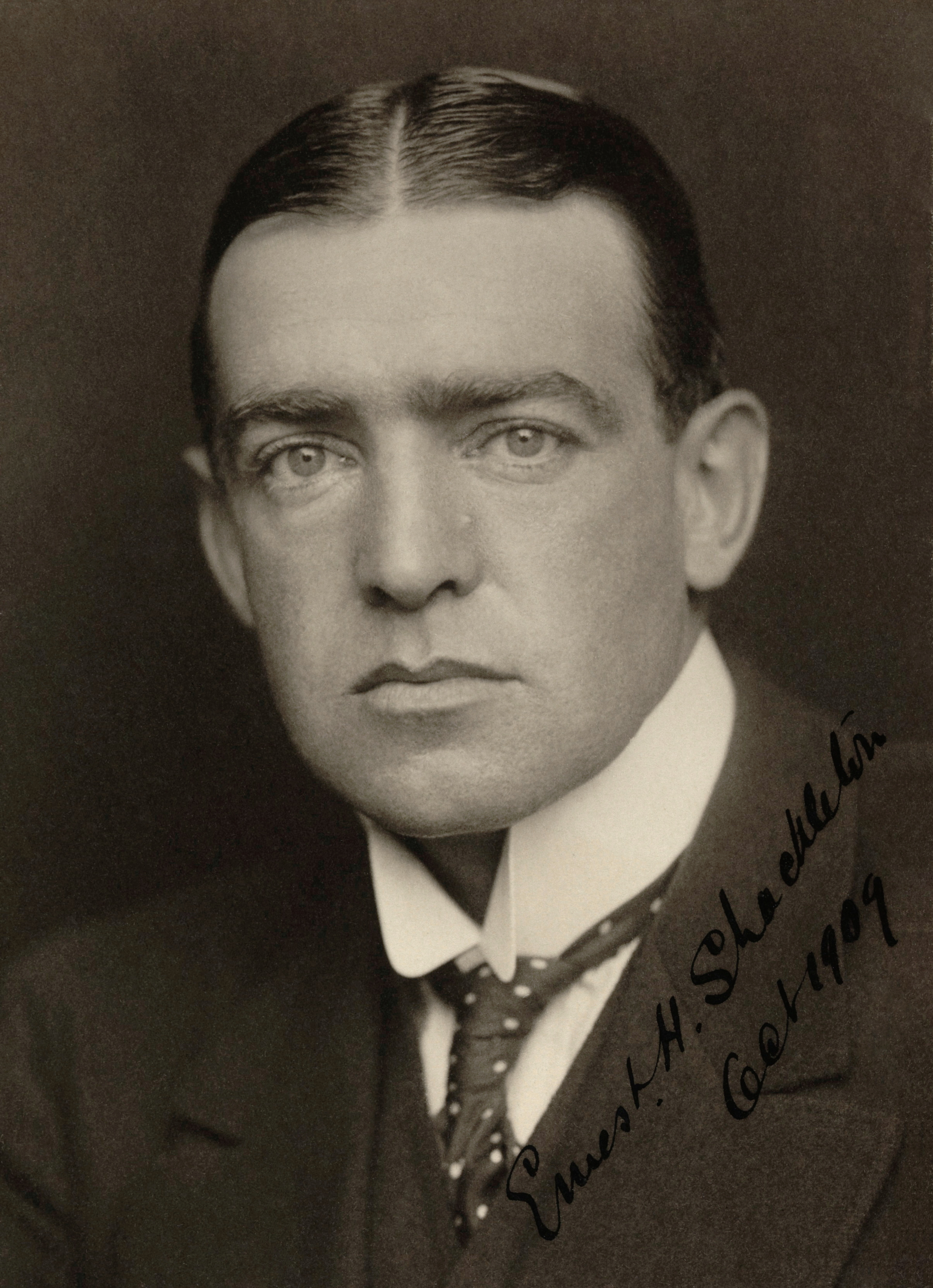
Sir Ernest Shackleton

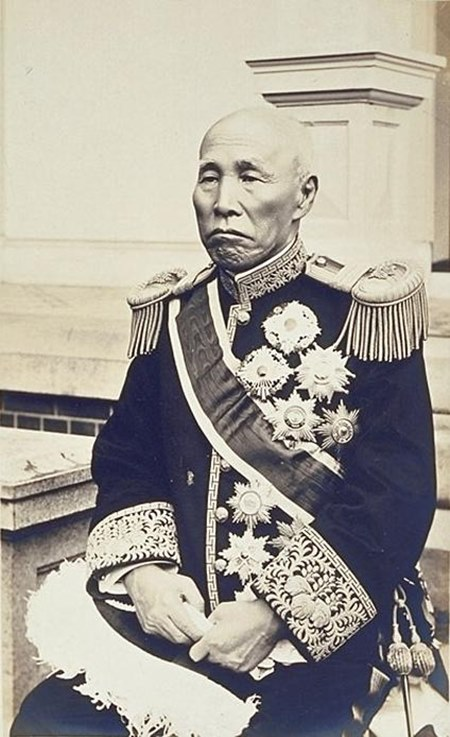
Ōkuma Shigenobu

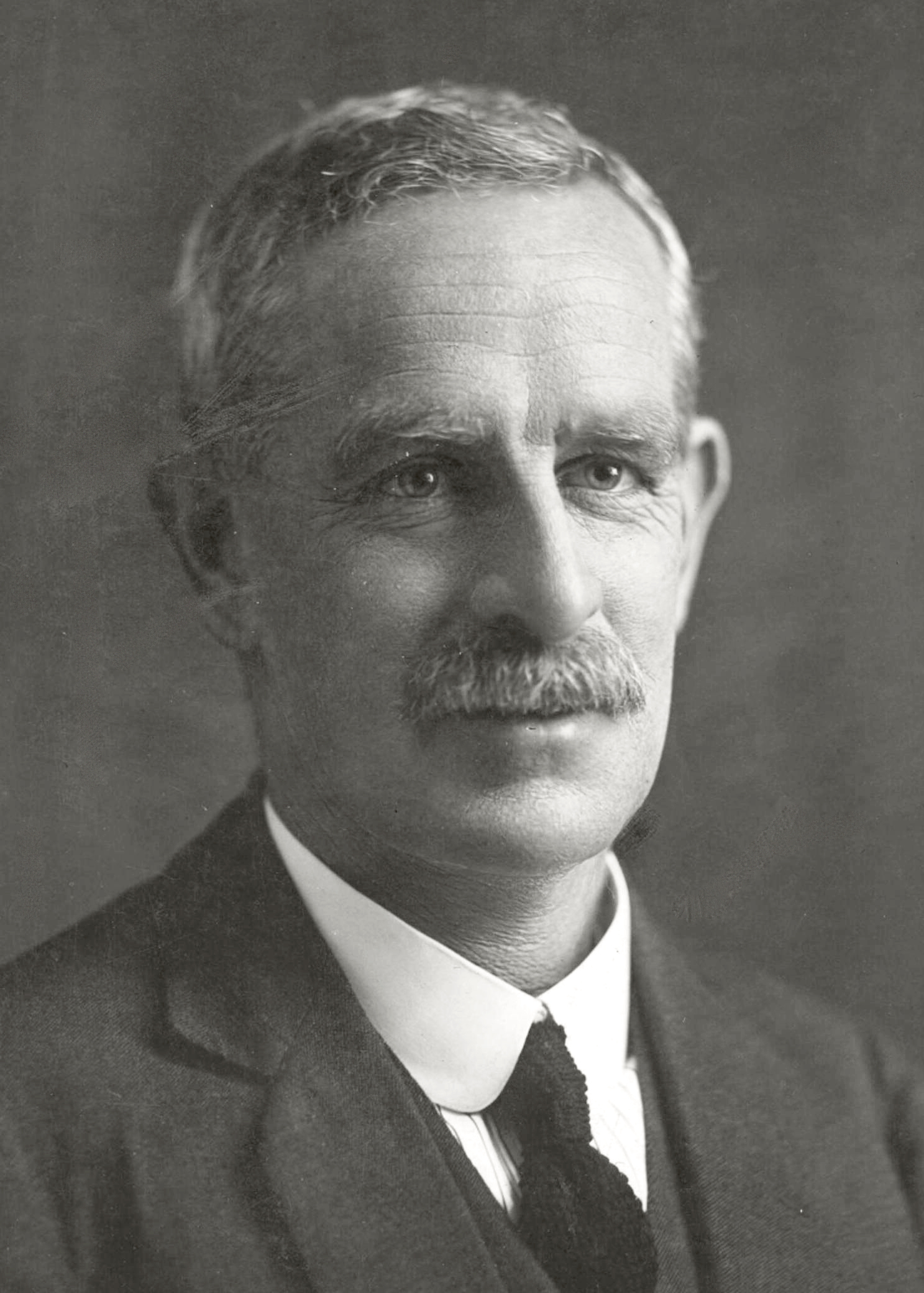
Frank Tudor

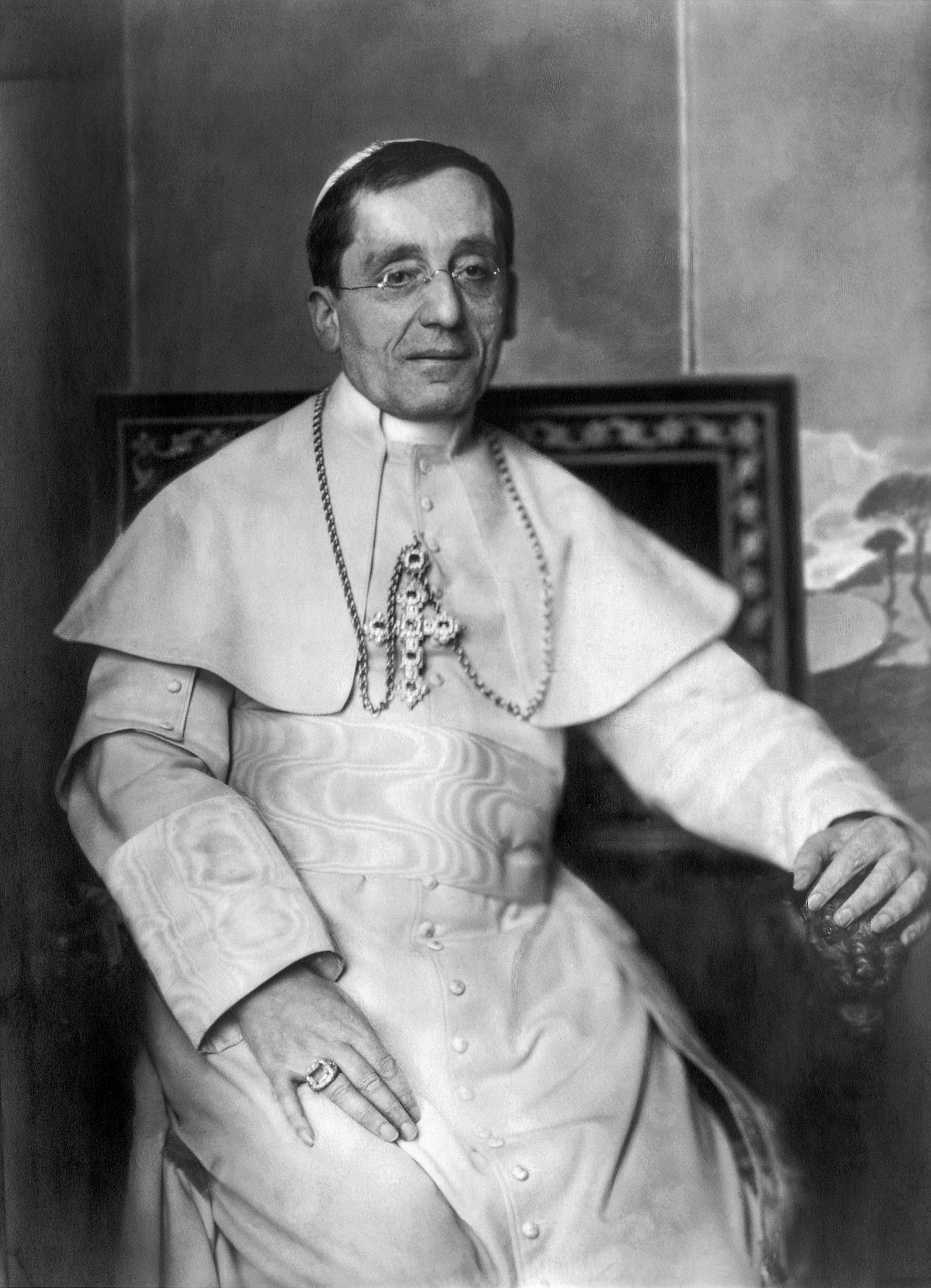
Pope Benedict XV

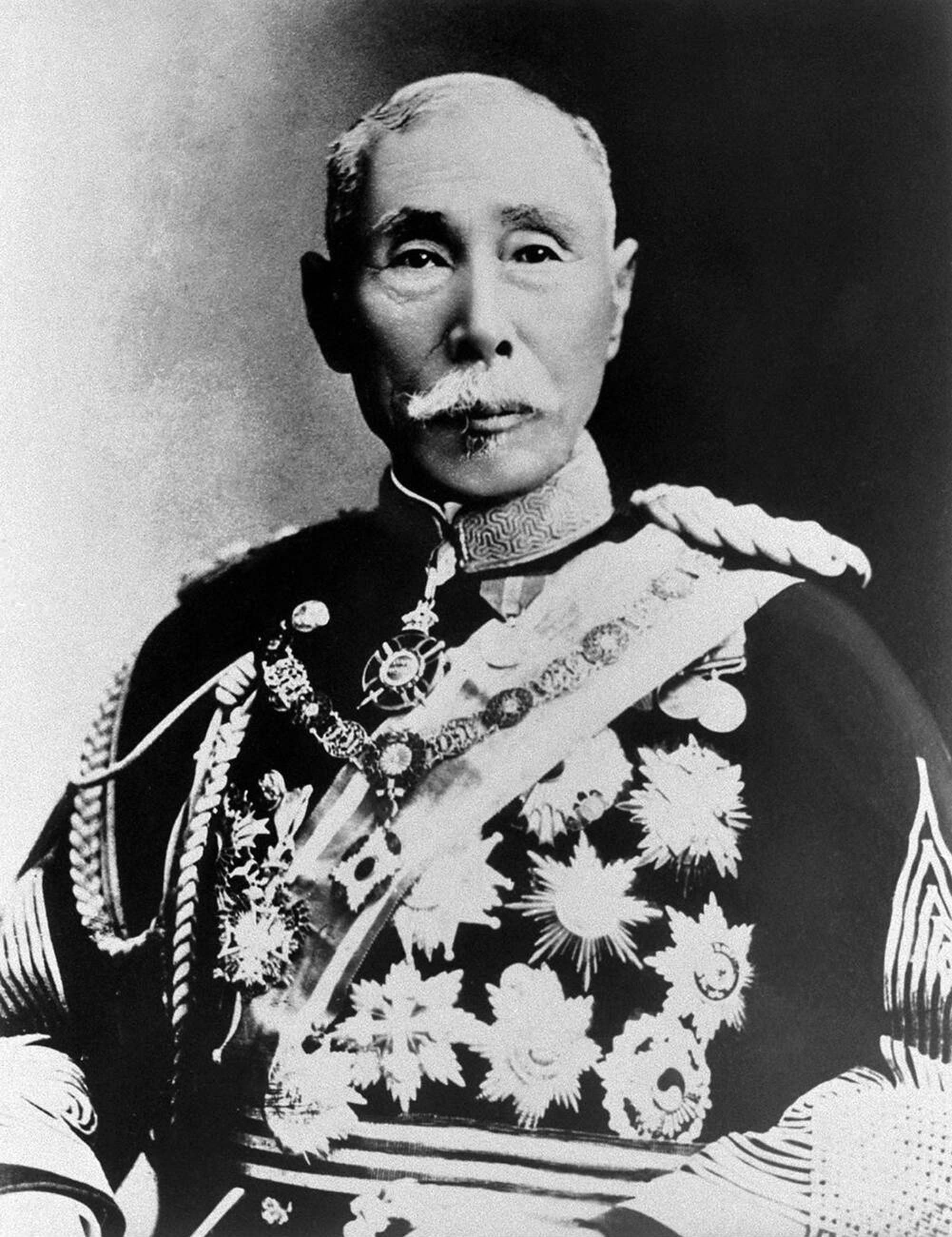
Yamagata Aritomo

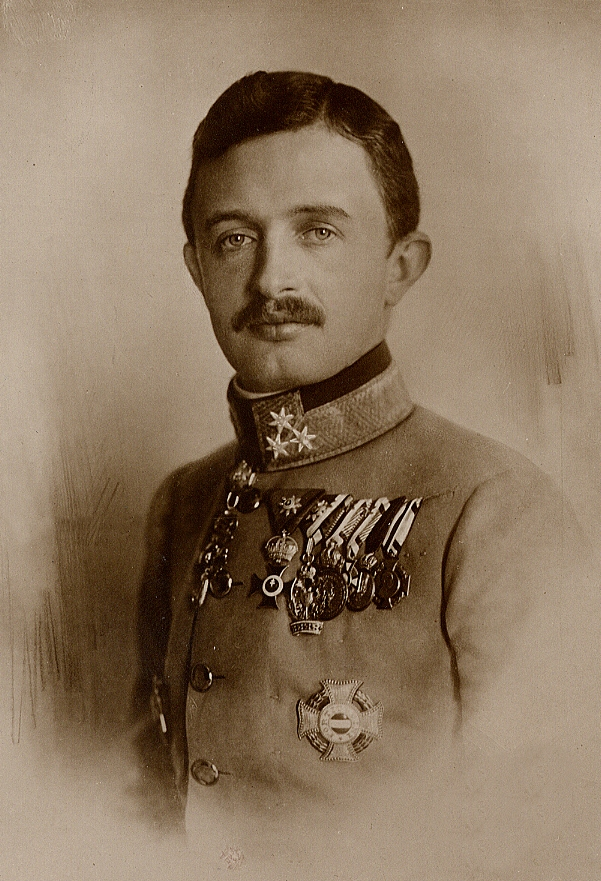
Charles I of Austria

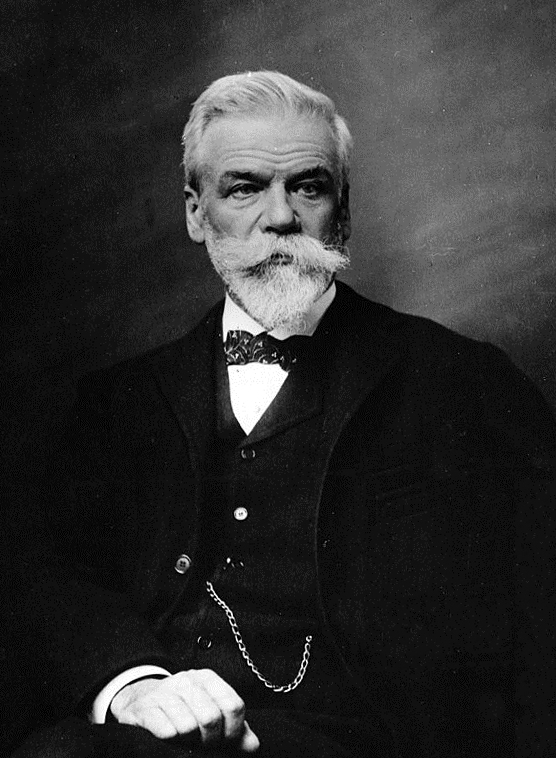
Ernest Solvay

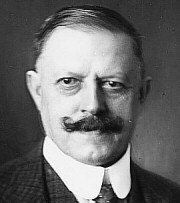
Michael Mayr

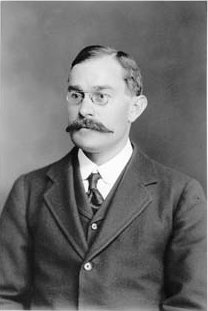
W. H. R. Rivers

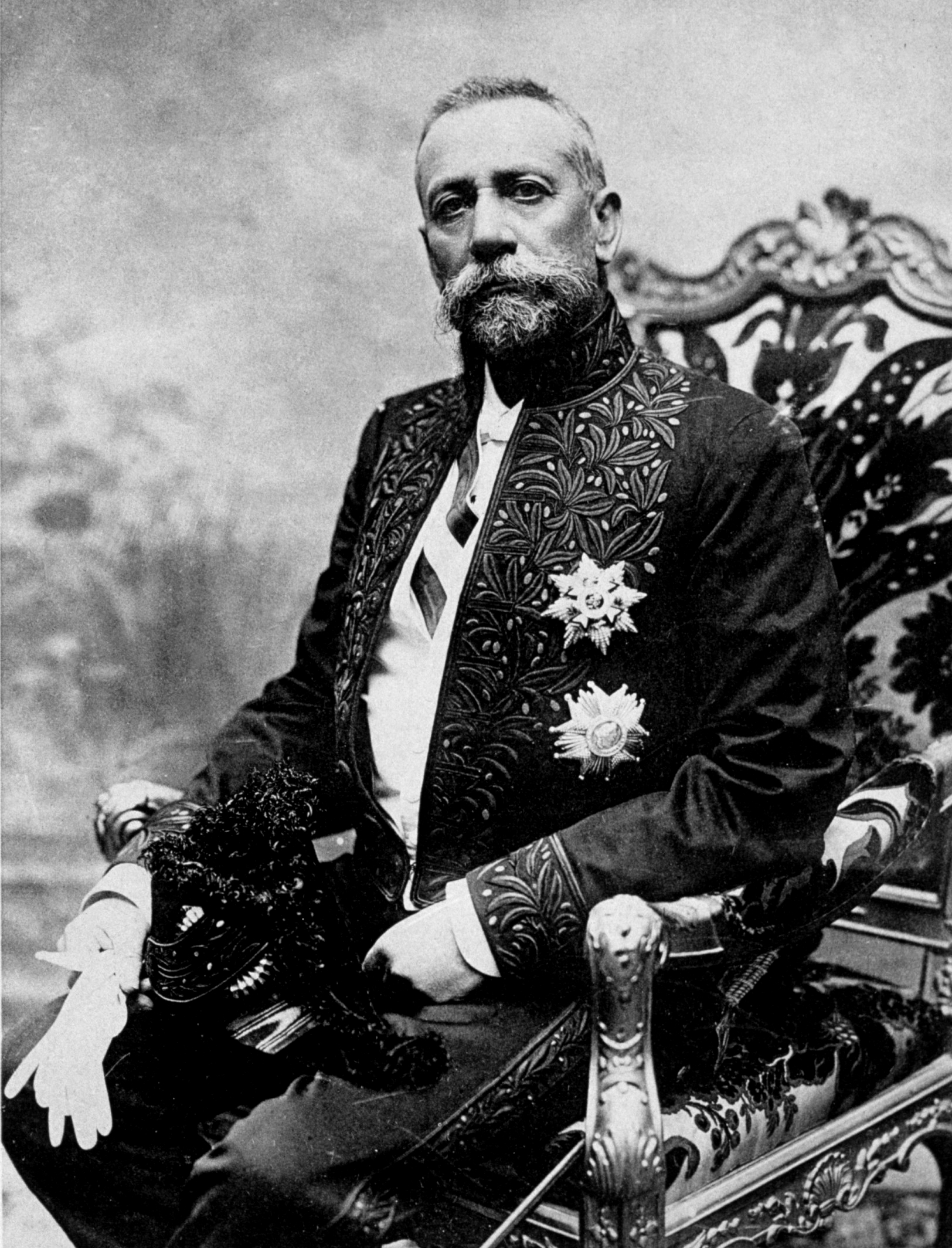
Albert I, Prince of Monaco

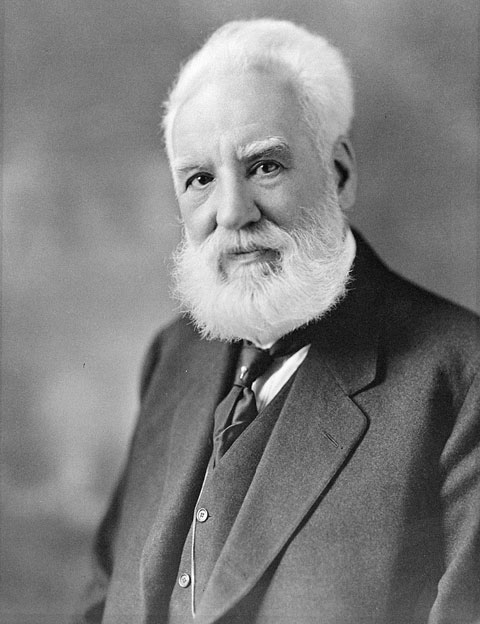
Alexander Graham Bell

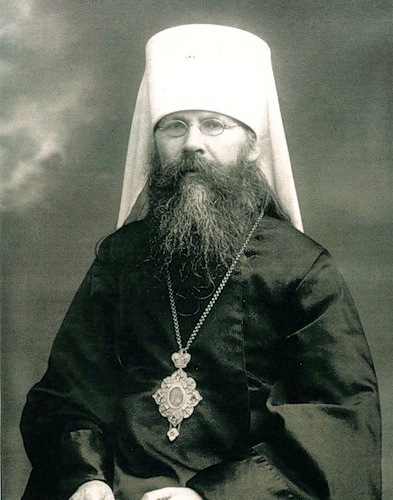
Saint Benjamin of Petrograd

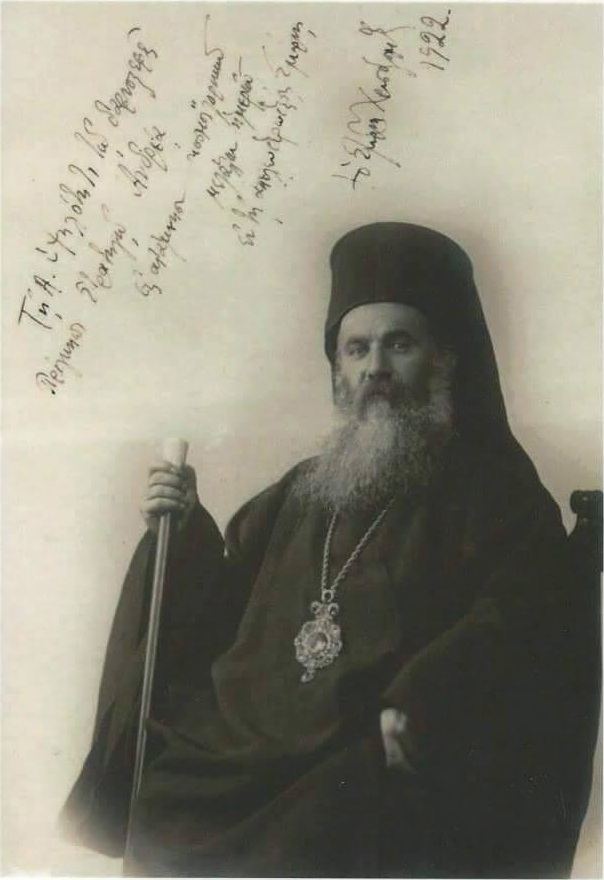
Saint Chrysostomos of Smyrna

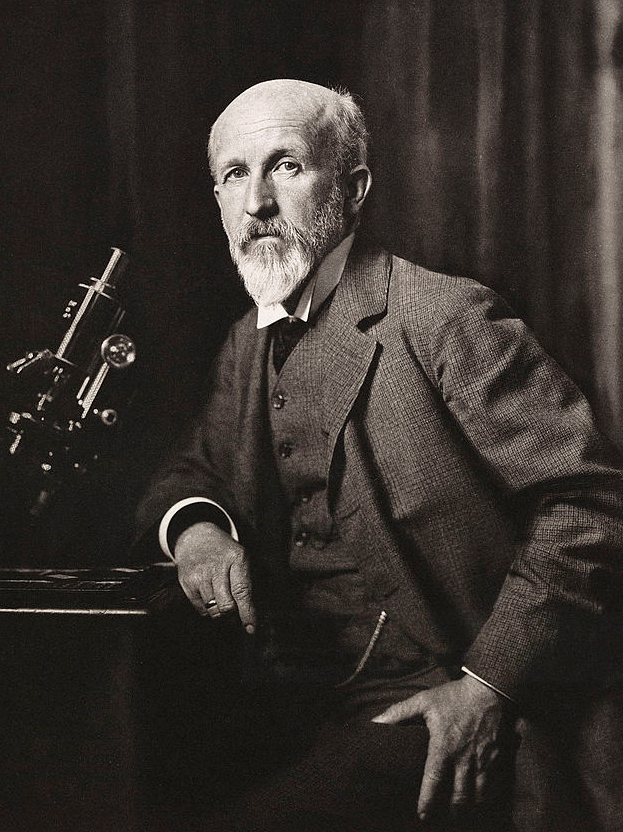
Oscar Hertwig

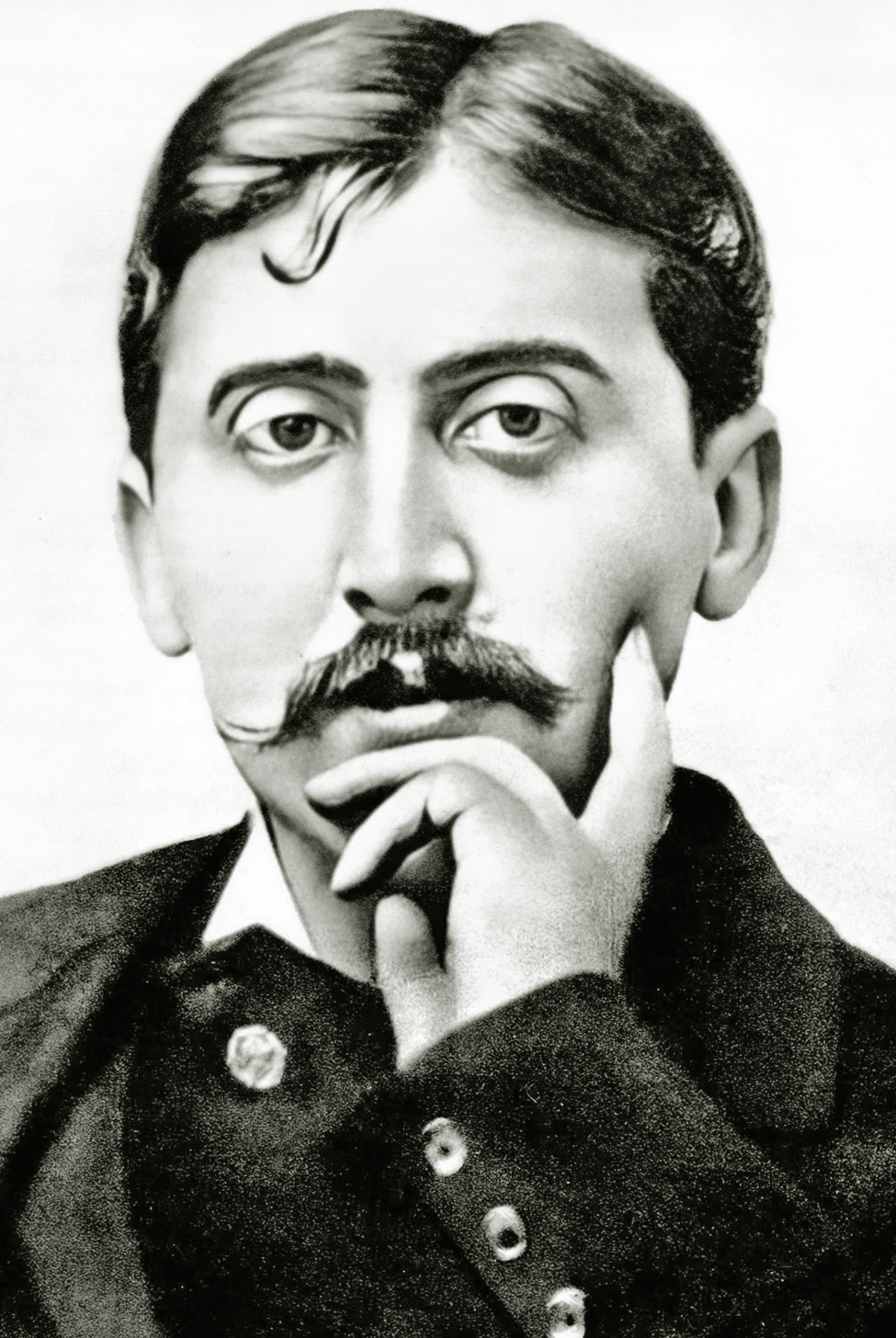
Marcel Proust

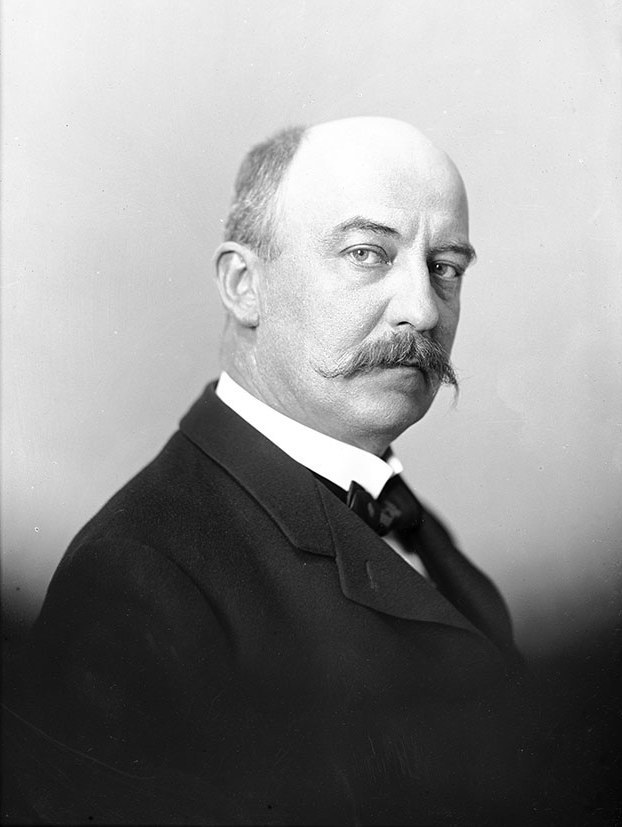
Gabriel Narutowicz

=== January ===
- January 1 – István Kühár, Prekmurje Slovene writer, politician (b. 1887)
- January 5 – Sir Ernest Shackleton, British explorer (b. 1874)
- January 10
  - Ōkuma Shigenobu, 2-time Prime Minister of Japan (b. 1838)
  - Frank Tudor, Australian politician (b. 1866)
- January 15 – John Kirk, British explorer (b. 1832)
- January 22
  - Pope Benedict XV (b. 1854)
  - Fredrik Bajer, Danish politician, pacifist and Nobel Peace Prize recipient (b. 1837)
  - James Bryce, 1st Viscount Bryce, Irish-born politician, diplomat and historian (b. 1838)
  - William Christie, British astronomer (b. 1845)
- January 23 – Arthur Nikisch, Hungarian conductor (b. 1855)
- January 27
  - Nellie Bly, American undercover journalist (b. 1864)
  - Giovanni Verga, Italian writer (b. 1840)
- January 31 – Heinrich Reinhardt, Austrian composer (b. 1865)

=== February ===
- February 1
  - Yamagata Aritomo, Japanese field marshal, 3rd Prime Minister of Japan (b. 1838)
  - William Desmond Taylor, Irish-born film director (b. 1872)
- February 3
  - Christiaan de Wet, Boer general, rebel leader, and politician (b. 1854)
  - John Butler Yeats, Northern Irish artist (b. 1839)
- February 4 – Henry Jones, British philosopher (b. 1852)
- February 8 – Kabayama Sukenori, Japanese samurai, general and statesman (b. 1837)
- February 14 – Heikki Ritavuori, Finnish Minister of Interior (b. 1880)
- February 16 – Newton Knight, American farmer, soldier and Southern Unionist in Mississippi and Civil War guerrilla (b. 1829)
- February 23 – John Joseph Jolly Kyle, Argentine chemist (b. 1838).
- February 25 – Henri Désiré Landru, French serial killer (executed) (b. 1869)

=== March ===
- March 1 – Pichichi, Spanish footballer (b. 1892)
- March 4 – Bert Williams, American entertainer (b. 1874)
- March 10 – Harry Kellar, American magician (b. 1849)
- March 19 – Max von Hausen, German general (b. 1846)
- March 21 – C. V. Raman Pillai, Indian novelist and playwright (b. 1858)
- March 31 – Andreas Gruber (b. 1859), Cäzila Gruber (b. 1850), Viktoria Gabriel (b. 1887), Cäzila Gabriel (b. 1915), Josef Gruber (b. 1920) and Maria Baumgartner (b. 1878). The Hinterkaifeck murders

=== April ===
- April 1 – Emperor Charles I of Austria (b. 1887)
- April 2 – Hermann Rorschach, Swiss psychiatrist (b. 1884)
- April 8 – Erich von Falkenhayn, German general (b. 1861)
- April 9
  - Hans Fruhstorfer, German lepidopterist (b. 1866)
  - Patrick Manson, Scottish physician (b. 1844)
- April 14 – Cap Anson, American baseball player, MLB Hall of Famer (b. 1852)
- April 28 – Paul Deschanel, President of France (b. 1855)

=== May ===
- May 4 – Viktor Kingissepp, Estonian Communist politician (executed) (b. 1888)
- May 7 – Max Wagenknecht, German composer (b. 1857)
- May 12 – John Martin Poyer, United States Navy commander, 12th Governor of American Samoa (b. 1861)
- May 15 – Leslie Ward, English portrait artist, caricaturist (b. 1851)
- May 16 – Rudolf Montecuccoli, Austro-Hungarian admiral (b. 1843)
- May 18 – Charles Louis Alphonse Laveran, French physician, recipient of the Nobel Prize in Physiology or Medicine (b. 1845)
- May 19 – Son Byong-hi, Korean activist (b. 1861)
- May 21 – Michael Mayr, Austrian politician, 2nd Chancellor of Austria (b. 1864)
- May 26 – Ernest Solvay, Belgian chemist, philanthropist and entrepreneur (b. 1838)

=== June ===
- June 4 – W. H. R. Rivers, English doctor (b. 1864)
- June 6
  - Lillian Russell, American singer, actress (b. 1861)
  - Richard A. Ballinger, American politician (b. 1858)
- June 18
  - Jacobus Kapteyn, Dutch astronomer (b. 1851)
  - Belgrave Ninnis, British explorer (b. 1837)
- June 20 – Vittorio Monti, Italian composer (b. 1868)
- June 21 – Take Ionescu, 29th Prime Minister of Romania (b. 1858)
- June 22 – Sir Henry Wilson, 1st Baronet, British field marshal and politician (b. 1864)
- June 23 – Wu Tingfang, Chinese Premier of the Republic of China (b. 1842)
- June 24 – Walther Rathenau, German statesman, Weimar Republic foreign minister (assassinated) (b. 1867)
- June 26 – Prince Albert I of Monaco (b. 1848)
- June 27 – Prince Higashifushimi Yorihito of Japan (b. 1867)
- June 28 – Velimir Khlebnikov, Russian poet, playwright (b. 1885)

=== July ===
- July 4 – Lothar von Richthofen, German World War I flying ace (flying accident) (b. 1894)
- July 6 – Mary Theresa Ledóchowska, Polish-born missionary sister (b. 1863)
- July 8 – Muhammad V an-Nasir, Bey of Tunis (b. 1855)
- July 17 – Heinrich Rubens, German physicist (b. 1865)
- July 20 – Andrey Markov, Russian mathematician (b. 1856)
- July 22 – Jōkichi Takamine, Japanese chemist (b. 1854)
- July 25 – Paul Maistre, French general (b. 1858)
- July 28 – Jules Guesde, French Socialist journalist and politician (b. 1845)
- July 31 – Mary Noailles Murfree, American novelist (b. 1850)

=== August ===
- August 1 – Harry Boland, Irish republican (b. 1887)
- August 2 – Alexander Graham Bell, Scottish-born Canadian-American inventor (b. 1847)
- August 3 – Ture Malmgren, Swedish journalist, politician (b. 1851)
- August 4
  - Nikolai Nebogatov, Russian admiral (b. 1849)
  - Enver Pasha, Ottoman military leader, Turkish revolutionary (b. 1881)
- August 5 – Tommy McCarthy, American baseball player, MLB Hall of Famer (b. 1863)
- August 12 – Arthur Griffith, Irish republican, President of Dáil Éireann (b. 1872)
- August 13 – Saint Benjamin of Petrograd (b. 1873)
- August 14 – Alfred Harmsworth, 1st Viscount Northcliffe, British newspaper magnate (b. 1865)
- August 19 – Felip Pedrell, Spanish composer (b. 1841)
- August 22
  - Sir Thomas Brock, British sculptor (b. 1847)
  - Michael Collins, Irish republican, revolutionary, and Chairman of the Provisional Government (assassinated) (b. 1890)
- August 23 – Gheorghe Bengescu, Romanian diplomat and man of letters (b. 1844)
- August 25 – Ioannis Svoronos, Greek numismatist (b. 1863)
- August 29 – Georges Sorel, French philosopher, theorist of revolutionary syndicalism (b. 1847)

=== September ===
- September 1 – Princess Helena, Duchess of Albany, British royal (b. 1861)
- September 4 – James Young, Scottish footballer (motorcycle accident) (b. 1882)
- September 5 – Sarah Winchester, American builder of the Winchester Mystery House (b. 1837)
- September 7 – William Stewart Halsted, American surgeon (b. 1852)
- September 10
  - Saint Chrysostomos of Smyrna (b. 1867)
  - Wilfrid Scawen Blunt, British poet (b. 1840)
- September 18 – Alfons Grotowski, Polish sanitary engineer (b. 1833)
- September 25 – Carlo Caneva, Italian general (b. 1845)
- September 26
  - Sir Charles Wade, Australian politician, Premier of New South Wales (b. 1863)
  - Thomas E. Watson, American politician, senator (b. 1856)

=== October ===
- October 7 – Marie Lloyd, British singer (b. 1870)
- October 11 – Prince August Leopold of Saxe-Coburg and Gotha (b. 1867)
- October 19 – Seaton Schroeder, American admiral (b. 1849)
- October 22 – Lyman Abbott, American theologian (b. 1835)
- October 25 – Oscar Hertwig, German zoologist (b. 1849)
- October 30 – Géza Gárdonyi, Hungarian author (b. 1863)

=== November ===
- November 1 – Lima Barreto, Brazilian writer (b. 1881)
- November 7 – Sam Thompson, American baseball player, MLB Hall of Famer (b. 1860)
- November 18 – Marcel Proust, French author (b. 1871)
- November 23 – Eduard Seler, Prussian scholar, Mesoamericanist (b. 1849)
- November 24
  - Erskine Childers, Irish novelist, nationalist (executed) (b. 1870)
  - Sidney Sonnino, 19th Prime Minister of Italy (b. 1847)
- November 27 – Demetrio Castillo Duany, Cuban revolutionary, soldier, and politician (b. 1856)
- November 28 – Dimitrios Gounaris, 94th Prime Minister of Greece (b. 1867)

=== December ===
- December 8 – Mary Marcy, American socialist (b. 1877)
- December 12 – John Wanamaker, American businessman (b. 1838)
- December 13 – Hannes Hafstein, 1st Prime Minister of Iceland (b. 1861)
- December 14 – Henry Pierrepoint, British executioner (b. 1878)
- December 16 – Gabriel Narutowicz, Polish professor and politician, 1st President of Poland (assassinated) (b. 1865)
- December 17 – David Lindsay, Australian explorer (b. 1856)

=== Date unknown ===
- Édouard Harlé, French engineer and prehistorian (b. 1850)
- Sufi Azizur Rahman, Bengali Muslim theologian and teacher (b. 1862)
- Sergei Sheydeman, Russian general (b. 1857)

== Nobel Prizes ==

- Physics – Niels Henrik David Bohr
- Chemistry – Francis William Aston
- Physiology or Medicine – Archibald Vivian Hill, Otto Fritz Meyerhof
- Literature – Jacinto Benavente
- Peace – Fridtjof Nansen

== Sources ==
- Herz, Peggy (1975). TV Close-ups. New York: Scholastic. OCLC 2360608.
