= L'Action sénégalaise =

l'Action sénégalaise
- Type: Weekly
- Founded: 1922
- Language: French language
- Headquarters: Saint-Louis

L'Action sénégalaise ('Senegalese Action') was a French language weekly newspaper published from Saint-Louis, Senegal. The publication was founded in 1922. From 1931 to 1934, Ahmed Sow Télémaque was the director of the newspaper.
