= List of Belgian historians =

This is a list of historians who worked in Belgium and its predecessor states and made contributions to the history of Belgium.

== Medieval Belgium ==
- Heriger of Lobbes (c.925–1007), compiler of the Gesta Episcoporum Leodiensium to 667
- Anselm of Liège (1008–c.1056), continuator of the Gesta Episcoporum Leodiensium from 667 to 1048
- Sigebert of Gembloux (c.1030–1112), author of Chronicon sive Chronographia and Gesta abbatum Gemblacensium
- Anselm of Gembloux (died 1136), continuator of Sigebert of Gembloux's Chronicon
- Renier of St Laurent (died 1188), author of Triumphale Bulonicum on the siege of Bouillon Castle, 1141
- Lambert of Ardres (fl. 1194–1203), author of Historia comitum Ghisnensium
- Giles of Orval, continuator of the Gesta episcoporum Leodiensium from 1048 to 1247
- Jacob van Maerlant (1230/40–1288/99), author of a world chronicle, the Spiegel Historiael
- Jan van Heelu (13th century), author of a Rymkronyk of the 1288 Battle of Worringen
- Jean de Hocsem (1278–1348), continuator of the Gesta episcoporum Leodiensium from 1247 to 1347
- Jan van Boendale (c.1280–c.1351), author of Brabantsche yeesten (a chronicle of the Duchy of Brabant) and Van den derden Eduwaert (an account of the 1340 Siege of Tournai)
- Jacques de Guyse (1334−1399), author of Annales Historiae Illustrium Principum Hannoniae (Annals of Hainaut)
- Jean d'Outremeuse (1338–1400), author of La Geste de Liége and Ly Myreur des Histors
- Jean de Stavelot
- Gilles li Muisis
- Edmond de Dynter, author of Chronica ducum Lotharingiae et Brabantiae
- Jean Mansel
- Jean d'Enghien
- Jean de Haynin
- Jacques de Hemricourt (1333–1403), author of the Miroir des nobles de Hesbaye
- Guillaume de Vottem (died 1403), author of a chronicle of Liège
- Jean Froissart (c.1337–c.1405), author of a chronicle of the opening decades of the Hundred Years' War
- Wein van Cotthem (c.1390–1457), author of two books of the Brabantsche yeesten
- Petrus de Thimo (1393–1474), author of Brabantiae historia diplomatica
- Enguerrand de Monstrelet (c.1400–1453), author of a chronicle of the later decades of the Hundred Years' War
- Georges Chastellain (died 1475), author of a chronicle of the period 1417–1474
- Olivier de la Marche (1425–1502), memoirist and chronicler of the Burgundian Netherlands
- Jean Molinet (1435–1507), author of La complainte de Grece
- Costen van Halmale (1432/37–1508), initial compiler of the Annales Antwerpienses

== Early-modern Belgium ==
- Filips Wielant (1440/1–1520), author of Recueil des Antiquités de Flandre
- Remi du Puys (active 1511–1515)
- Cornelius Grapheus (1482–1558)
- Adrianus Barlandus (1486–1538)
- Melchior Barlaeus (died 1540)
- Jacobus Lessabaeus (died 1557)
- Jacobus Meyerus (1491–1552)
- Hubertus Thomas (c.1495–1555)
- Joos de Damhouder (1507–1581)
- Marcus van Vaernewyck (1518–1569), author of Van die beroerlicke tijden in die Nederlanden en voornamelick in Ghendt 1566-1568 and De historie van Belgis
- Johannes Goropius Becanus (1519–1572)
- Lodovico Guicciardini (1521–1589)
- Joannes Molanus (1533–1585)
- Petrus Divaeus (1535–1581)
- Jacobus Marchantius (1537–1609), author of De rebus gestis à Flandriae comitibus (1557) and Flandria commentariorum (1596)
- Justus Lipsius (1547–1606)
- Floris Van der Haer (1547–1634)
- Guillaume Gazet (1554–1612)
- Franciscus Haraeus (1555?–1631)
- Adriaan van Meerbeeck (1563–1627)
- Ferry de Locre (1571–1614)
- Aubertus Miraeus (1573–1640)
- Erycius Puteanus (1574–1646)
- Jean-Baptiste Gramaye (1579–1635)
- Michel Routart (c.1580–1653), author of Oculus historiae (1628)
- Nicolaus Vernulaeus (1583–1649)
- Antonius Sanderus (1586–1664), author of Flandria Illustrata (1641)
- Valerius Andreas (1588–1655), author of Bibliotheca Belgica (1623) and Fasti academici (1635)
- Gaspar Gevartius (1593–1666)
- Olivier de Wree (1596–1652), author of Sigilla comitum Flandriae (1639) and Genealogia Comitum Flandriae (1642–1643)
- Charles de Visch (1596–1666)
- Martin Valvekens (1604–1682)

== Kingdom of Belgium ==
=== 19th century ===
- Sylvain Balau
- Stanislas Bormans
- Victor Coremans
- Louis Prosper Gachard
- Arthur Gaillard
- Victor Gaillard
- Théodore Juste
- Godefroid Kurth
- Joseph Kervyn de Lettenhove
- Philippe Kervyn de Volkaersbeke
- Henri Lonchay
- François Joseph Ferdinand Marchal, author of Histoire des Pays-Bas autrichiens (1841) and Histoire politique du règne de l'empereur Charles-Quint (1856)
- Charles Moeller
- Jean Moeller
- P. F. X. de Ram
- Frédéric Auguste Ferdinand Thomas de Reiffenberg
- Edouard Van Even
- Alphonse Wauters
- G. Henry Wouters, author of Historiae ecclesiasticae compendium (3 vols., 1842–1843); Dissertationes in selecta historiae ecclesiasticae capita (4 vols., 1868–1872)

=== 20th century ===
- Stephanus Axters (Church history)
- Ursmer Berlière (Church history)
- Wim Blockmans (medievalist)
- Wilfrid Brulez (economic history)
- Patricia Carson (medievalist)
- Alfred Cauchie (Church history)
- Lucien Ceyssens (Church history)
- Hilde De Ridder-Symoens (university history)
- Arthur De Schrevel (Church history)
- Marie de Villermont (women's history)
- François-Louis Ganshof (medievalist)
- Léopold Genicot (medievalist)
- Léon-Ernest Halkin (Church history)
- Karl Hanquet (medievalist)
- Paul Harsin (early modernist)
- Félix Magnette (18th and 19th centuries)
- Jules Mees (historical geography)
- Jos Monballyu
- Édouard de Moreau (Church history)
- Anne Morelli (history of migration)
- Henri Pirenne (medievalist)
- Walter Prevenier
- Jan Roegiers (intellectual historian)
- Félix Rousseau (medievalist)
- Aloïs Simon (Church history)
- Jean Stengers (colonial history)
- Jacques Stiennon (medievalist)
- Egied-Idesbald Strubbe
- Charles Terlinden
- Alfons Thijs (early modernist)
- Raoul Van Caenegem (medievalist)
- Leon van der Essen
- Herman Van der Wee (economic historian)
- J. A. van Houtte (social and economic historian)
- Raymond van Uytven (medievalist)
- Charles Verlinden (medievalist)
- Léopold Willaert (Church history)
- Lode Wils

=== 21st century ===
- Hans Cools (early-modern history)
- Sophie De Schaepdrijver (20th-century history)
- Dirk Imhof (book history)
- Randall Lesaffer (legal history)
- Brigitte Meijns (medievalist)

== Art historians ==
- Barbara Baert
- Marthe Crick-Kuntziger
- Dirk De Vos
- Elisabeth Dhanens
- Isabelle Errera
- Hippolyte Fierens-Gevaert
- Philippe Roberts-Jones
- Adelbert Van de Walle
- Katlijne Van der Stighelen
- Jan Van der Stock
- Alphonse-Jules Wauters

== Literary historians ==
- Rita Lejeune

== Historians of philosophy ==
- Maurice De Wulf
- Adriaan Pattin
- Isabelle Stengers
