= Ooidonk Castle =

Castle in East Flanders, Belgium

Coordinates: 51.0013°N 3.5835°E

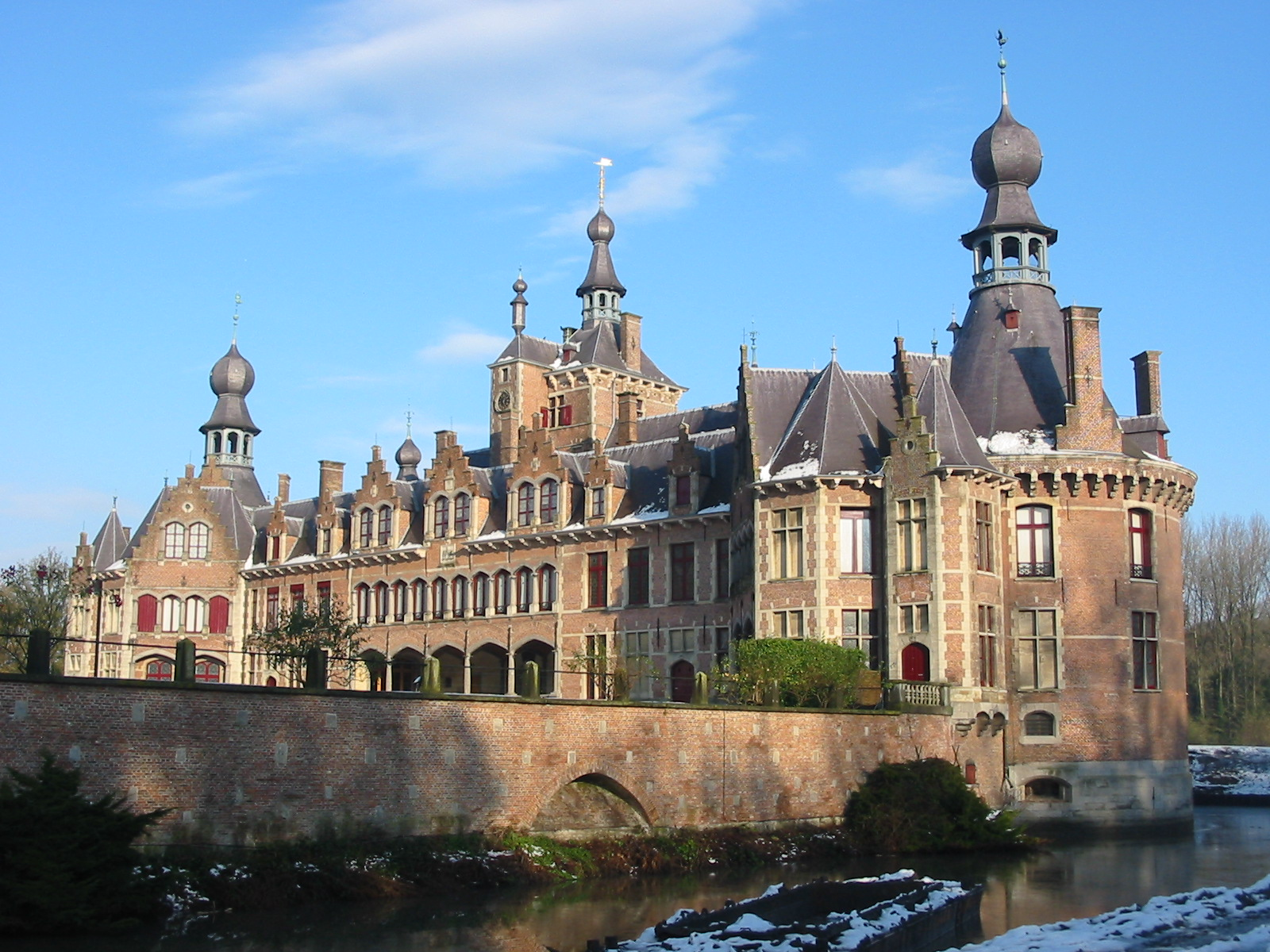
Ooidonk Castle from the rear

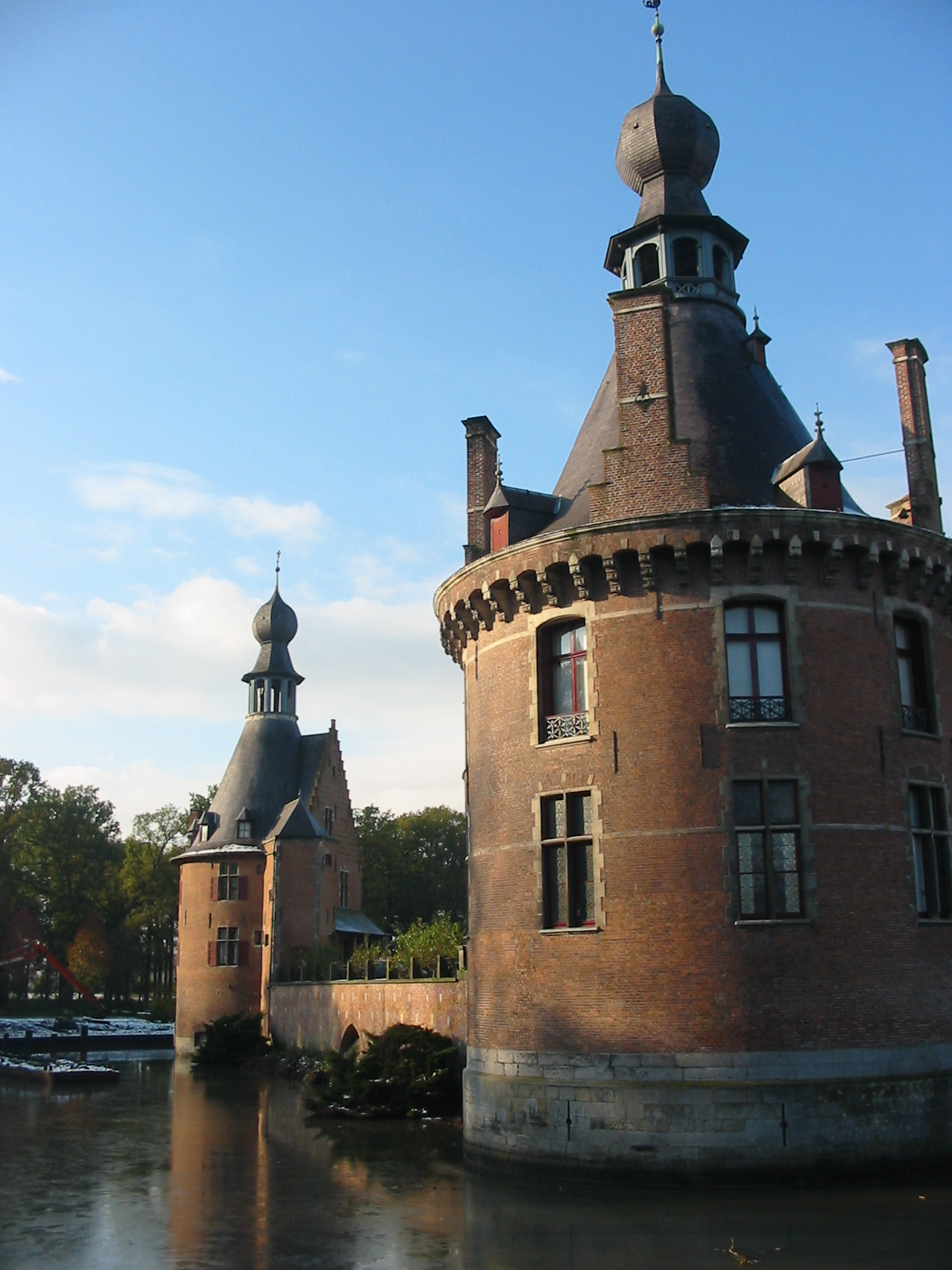
Ooidonk Castle from the left

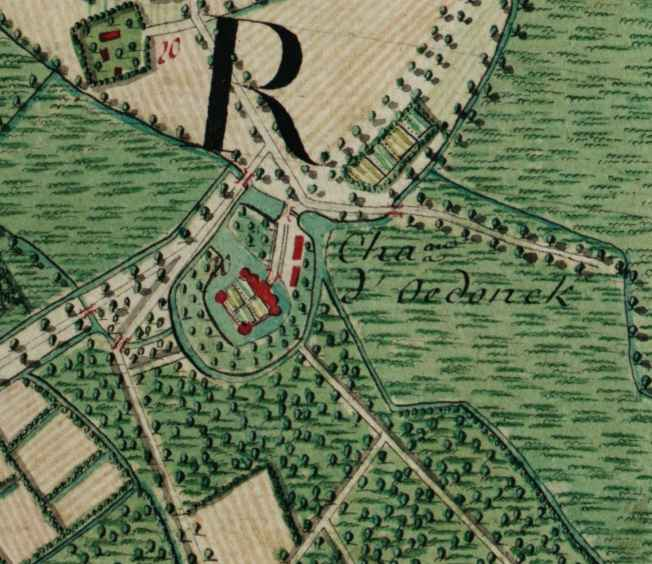
Ooidonk Castle on the Ferraris map (around 1775)

Ooidonk Castle (Dutch: Kasteel Ooidonk) is a castle in the city of Deinze, East Flanders, Belgium. The castle is the residence of the current Count t'Kint de Roodenbeke. Ooidonk Castle is situated at an altitude of 11 meters.

== History ==
Ooidonk is already mentioned in 1230 : "Nicolas, chaplain of Hodunc".

A fortress was first built on the site of the current castle, intended to defend the city of Ghent and to fortify the river Leie. This fortress was owned by Jean de Fosseux, lord of Nevele.

The castle was destroyed for the first time in 1491 by the people of Ghent, in revolt against Maximilian I.

In 1568, Philippe II de Montmorency-Nivelle, Count of Hornes, Lord of Nevele and owner of the estate was beheaded, along with the Count of Egmont, by the Spanish Duke of Alba in Brussels.

In 1579, during the wars of religion, the castle, defenseless, was destroyed by the Ghent Calvinists.

The ruins and lands were later acquired by Martin della Faille, a merchant from Antwerp. He rebuilt the castle in a Renaissance style and transformed it into a place of residence in Hispano-Flemish style.

In 1864, the castle and lands were acquired by Henri t' Kint de Rodenbeke who went on to become President of the Senate and Minister of State. He restored and transformed the castle.

It is now the private property of Count Henry t'Kint de Roodenbeke, son of the late Count Juan t'Kint de Roodenbeke.

In 1944, the castle was classified as a protected landmark. In 1980, other constructions around it were also classified, and in 1995, so was the rest of the estate. Ooidonk Castle is open to the public from April 1 to September 15, and the park (with its French garden) can be visited year round.

== See also ==
- List of castles in Belgium
