= Golden Age =

Term denoting a period of primordial peace, harmony, stability, and prosperity

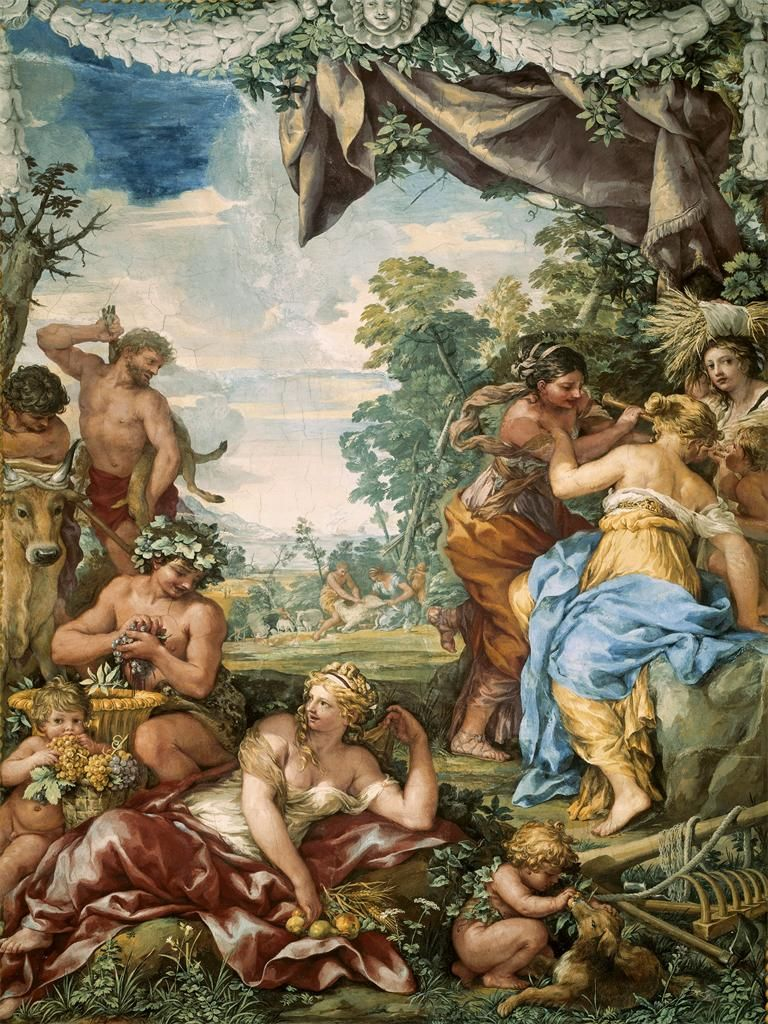
The Golden Age by Pietro da Cortona (Palazzo Pitti, Florence, Italy)

The term Golden Age comes from Greek mythology, particularly the Works and Days of Hesiod, and is part of the description of temporal decline of the state of peoples through five Ages, Gold being the first and the one during which the Golden Race of humanity (Greek: χρύσεον γένος chrýseon génos) lived. After the end of the first age was the Silver, then the Bronze, after this the Heroic age, with the fifth and current age being Iron.

By extension, "Golden Age" denotes a period of primordial peace, harmony, stability, and prosperity. During this age, peace and harmony prevailed in that people did not have to work to feed themselves for the earth provided food in abundance. They lived to a very old age with a youthful appearance, eventually dying peacefully, with spirits living on as "guardians". Plato in Cratylus (397 e) recounts the golden race of humans who came first. He clarifies that Hesiod did not mean literally made of gold, but good and noble.

In classical Greek mythology, the Golden Age was presided over by the leading Titan Cronus; in Latin authors it was associated with the god Saturn. In some versions of the myth Astraea also ruled. She lived with men until the end of the Silver Age. But in the Bronze Age, when men became violent and greedy, she fled to the stars, where she appears as the constellation Virgo, holding the scales of Justice, or Libra.

European pastoral literary tradition often depicted nymphs and shepherds as living a life of rustic innocence and peace, set in Arcadia, a region of Greece that was the abode and center of worship of their tutelary deity, goat-footed Pan, who dwelt among them.

== The Golden Age in Europe: Greece ==
The earliest attested reference to the European myth of the Ages of Man 500 BCE–350 BCE appears in the late 6th century BCE works of the Greek poet Hesiod's Works and Days (109–126). Hesiod, a deteriorationist, identifies the Golden Age, the Silver Age, the Bronze Age, the Heroic Age, and the Iron Age. With the exception of the Heroic Age, each succeeding age was worse than the one that went before. Hesiod maintains that during the Golden Age, before the invention of the arts, the earth produced food in such abundance that there was no need for agriculture:

[Men] lived like gods without sorrow of heart, remote and free from toil and grief: miserable age rested not on them; but with legs and arms never failing they made merry with feasting beyond the reach of all devils. When they died, it was as though they were overcome with sleep, and they had all good things; for the fruitful earth unforced bare them fruit abundantly and without stint. They dwelt in ease and peace.

Plato in his Cratylus referred to an age of golden men and also at some length on Ages of Man from Hesiod's Works and Days. The Roman poet Ovid simplified the concept by reducing the number of Ages to four: Gold, Bronze, Silver, and Iron. Ovid's poetry was likely a prime source for the transmission of the myth of the Golden Age during the period when Western Europe had lost direct contact with Greek literature.

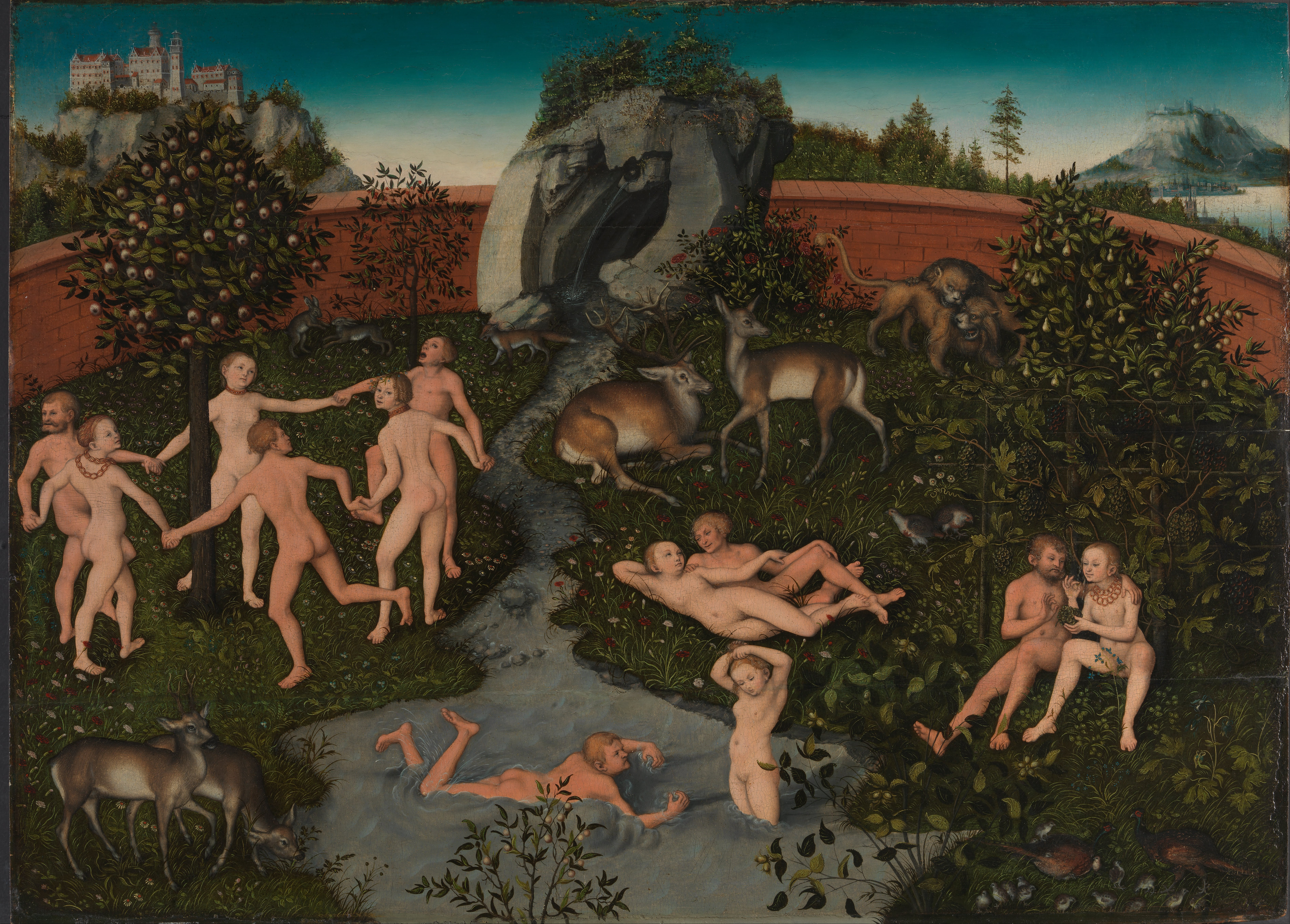
The Golden Age (c. 1530) by Lucas Cranach the Elder

In Hesiod's version, the Golden Age ended when the Titan Prometheus conferred on mankind the gift of fire and all the other arts. For this, Zeus punished Prometheus by chaining him to a rock in the Caucasus, where an eagle eternally ate at his liver. The gods sent the beautiful maiden Pandora to Prometheus's brother Epimetheus. The gods had entrusted Pandora with a box that she was forbidden to open; however, her uncontrollable curiosity got the better of her and she opened the box, thereby unleashing all manner of evil into the world.

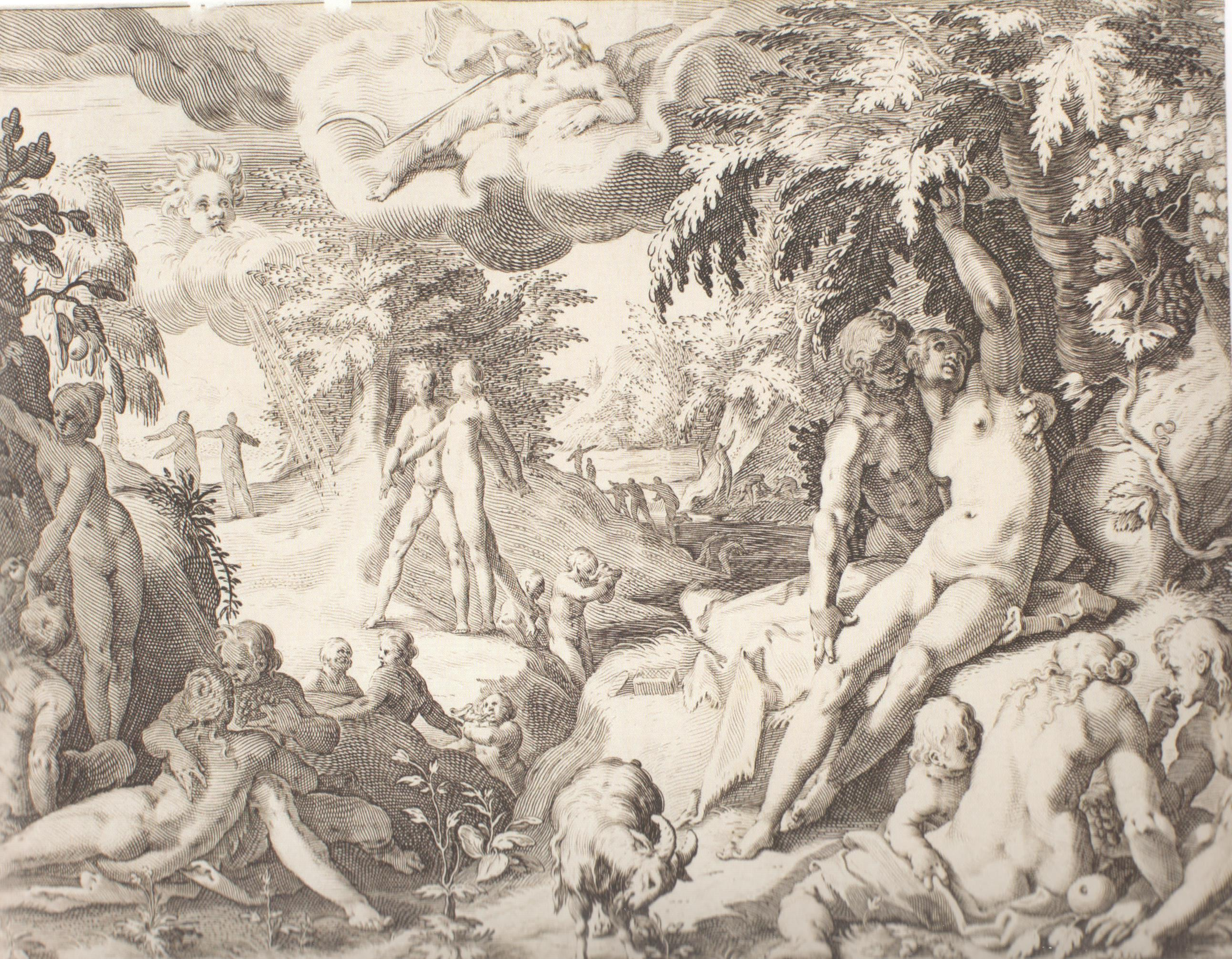
Robert Willemsz de Baudous: Golden Age, etching, c. 1598.

The Orphic school held similar beliefs about the early days of man, likewise denominating the ages with metals. In common with the many other mystery cults prevalent in the Graeco-Roman world (and their Indo-European religious antecedents), the world view of Orphism was cyclical. Initiation into its secret rites, together with ascetic practices, was supposed to guarantee the individual's soul eventual release from the grievous circle of mortality and also communion with the gods. Orphics sometimes identified the Golden Age with the era of the god Phanes, who was regent over the Olympus before Cronus. In classical mythology however, the Golden Age was associated with the reign of Saturn. In the 5th century BCE, the philosopher Empedocles, like Hesiod before him, emphasized the idea of primordial innocence and harmony in all of nature, including human society, from which he maintained there had been a steady deterioration until the present.

=== Arcadia ===
A tradition arose in Greece that the site of the original Golden Age had been Arcadia, an impoverished rural area of Greece where the herdsmen still lived on acorns and where the goat-footed god Pan had his home among the poplars on Mount Maenalus. However, in the 3rd century BCE, the Greek poet, Theocritus, writing in Alexandria, set his pastoral poetry on the lushly fertile island of Sicily, where he had been born. The protagonist of Theocritus's first Idyll, the goat herder, Daphnis, is taught to play the Syrinx (panpipes) by Pan himself.

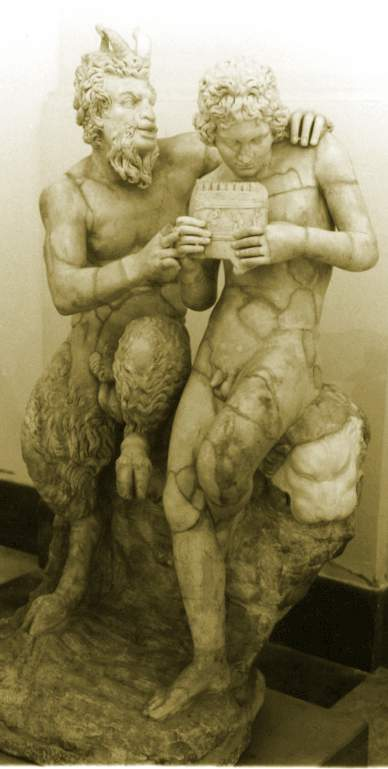
Sculpture of Pan teaching Daphnis to play the pipes; c. 100 BCE, found in Pompeii.

== The Golden Age in Rome: Virgil and Ovid ==
Writing in Latin during the turbulent period of revolutionary change at the end of the Roman Republic (roughly between 44 and 38 BCE), the poet Virgil moved the setting for his pastoral imitations of Theocritus back to an idealized Arcadia in Greece, thus initiating a rich and resonant tradition in subsequent European literature.

Virgil, moreover, introduced into his poetry the element of political allegory, which had been largely absent in Theocritus, even intimating in his fourth Eclogue that a new Golden Age of peace and justice was about to return:

Ultima Cumaei venit iam carminis aetas;
magnus ab integro saeclorum nascitur ordo:
iam redit et Virgo, redeunt Saturnia regna;
iam nova progenies caelo demittitur alto.

Translation:
Now the last age by Cumae's Sibyl sung
Has come and gone, and the majestic roll
Of circling centuries begins anew:
Astraea returns,
Returns old Saturn's reign,
With a new breed of men sent down from heaven.

Somewhat later, shortly before he wrote his epic poem the Aeneid, which dealt with the establishment of Roman Imperial rule, Virgil composed his Georgics (29 BCE), modeled directly on Hesiod's Works and Days and similar Greek works. Ostensibly about agriculture, the Georgics are in fact a complex allegory about how man's alterations of nature (through works) are related to good and bad government. Although Virgil does not mention the Golden Age by name in the Georgics, he does refer in them to a time when man was in harmony with nature before the reign of Jupiter, when:

Fields knew no taming hand of husbandmen
To mark the plain or mete with boundary-line.
Even this was impious; for the common stock
They gathered, and the earth of her own will
All things more freely, no man bidding, bore.

ante Iouem nulli subigebant arua coloni
ne signare quidem aut partiri limite campum
fas erat; in medium quaerebant, ipsaque tellus
omnia liberius nullo poscente ferebat. (Georgics, Book 1: 125–28)

This view, which identifies a State of Nature with the celestial harmony of which man's nature is (or should be, if properly regulated) a microcosm, reflects the Hellenistic cosmology that prevailed among literate classes of Virgil's era. It is seen again in Ovid's Metamorphoses (7 CE), in which the lost Golden Age is depicted as a place and time when, because nature and reason were harmoniously aligned, men were naturally good:

The Golden Age was first; when Man, yet new,
No rule but uncorrupted Reason knew:
And, with a native bent, did good pursue.
Unforc'd by punishment, un-aw'd by fear.
His words were simple, and his soul sincere;
Needless was written law, where none opprest:
The law of Man was written in his breast.

The Graeco-Roman concept of the "natural man" delineated by Ovid and many other classical writers, was especially popular during the Deistically inclined 18th century. It is often erroneously attributed to Rousseau, who did not share it.

== "Soft" and "hard" primitivism in Arcadia ==
In his famous essay, "Et in Arcadia ego: Poussin and the Elegiac Tradition", Erwin Panofsky remarks how in ancient times, "that particular not overly opulent, region of central Greece, Arcady, came to be universally accepted as an ideal realm of perfect bliss and beauty, a dream incarnate of ineffable happiness, surrounded nevertheless with a halo of 'sweetly sad' melancholy":

There had been, from the beginning of classical speculation, two contrasting opinions about the natural state of man, each of them, of course, a "Gegen-Konstruktion" to the conditions under which it was formed. One view, termed "soft" primitivism in an illuminating book by Lovejoy and Boas conceives of primitive life as a golden age of plenty, innocence, and happiness – in other words, as civilized life purged of its vices. The other, "hard" form of primitivism conceives of primitive life as an almost subhuman existence full of terrible hardships and devoid of all comforts – in other words, as civilized life stripped of its virtues.

Arcady, as we encounter it in all modern literature, and as we refer to it in our daily speech, falls under the heading of “soft" or golden-age primitivism. To be sure, this real Arcady was the domain of Pan, who could be heard playing the syrinx on Mount Maenalus; and its inhabitants were famous for their musical accomplishments as well as for their ancient lineage, rugged virtue, and rustic hospitality.

== Other Golden Ages ==
There are analogous concepts in the religious and philosophical traditions of the Indian subcontinent. For example, the Vedic or ancient Hindu culture saw history as cyclical, each cycle composed of four yugas (ages) – Satya Yuga (Golden Age), Treta Yuga (Silver Age), Dvapara Yuga (Bronze Age) and Kali Yuga (Iron Age) – correspond to the four Greek ages. Similar beliefs occur in the ancient Middle East and throughout the ancient world, as well.

=== Hebrew Bible ===
There is a reference to a succession of kingdoms in Nebuchadnezzar's dream in Daniel 2, in decreasing order identified as gold, silver, bronze, iron and finally mixed iron and clay.

31 "Your Majesty looked, and there before you stood a large statue – an enormous, dazzling statue, awesome in appearance. 32 The head of the statue was made of pure gold, its chest and arms of silver, its belly and thighs of bronze, 33 its legs of iron, its feet partly of iron and partly of baked clay. 34 While you were watching, a rock was cut out, but not by human hands. It struck the statue on its feet of iron and clay and smashed them. 35 Then the iron, the clay, the bronze, the silver and the gold were all broken to pieces and became like chaff on a threshing floor in the summer. The wind swept them away without leaving a trace. But the rock that struck the statue became a huge mountain and filled the whole earth."

— Daniel 2: 31–35

The interpretation of the dream follows in verses 36–45.

=== Hinduism ===
The Indian teachings differentiate the four world ages (yugas) not according to metals, but according to dharmic qualities (virtues), where the first age starts with the most and the last age ends with the least. The end is followed by a new cycle (Yuga Cycle) of the same four ages: Satya Yuga (golden age), Treta Yuga, Dvapara Yuga, and Kali Yuga (dark age), of which we are currently in Kali Yuga.

In Satya Yuga, knowledge, meditation, and communion with spirit hold special importance. Most people engage only in good, sublime deeds and mankind lives in harmony with the Earth. Ashrams become devoid of wickedness and deceit. Natyam (such as Bharatanatyam), according to Natya Shastra, did not exist in the Satya Yuga "because it was the time when all people were happy".

Satya Yuga (a.k.a. Krita Yuga) according to Mahabharata:

Men neither bought nor sold; there were no poor and no rich; there was no need to labour, because all that men required was obtained by the power of will; the chief virtue was the abandonment of all worldly desires. The Krita Yuga was without disease; there was no lessening with the years; there was no hatred or vanity, or evil thought whatsoever; no sorrow, no fear. All mankind could attain to supreme blessedness.

=== Germanic ===
Old Norse: Gullaldr ("Age of Gold") is used in Gylfaginning to describe the period after the creation of the world, and before the arrival of three women out of Jötunheimr, who have been proposed to be the Norns.

A second ideal period is Fróði's Peace, a semi-legendary time during the rule of a Danish king in which peace and prosperity was seen throughout Northern Europe.

=== Chinese mythology and religion ===
Shennong, in the myth cycles that thought of him as a culture hero rather than a god, was thought to have maintained a Golden Age in the world by helping humans by doing things such as eating every single plant to see which ones were edible, as well as his own suffering because of various poisonings he survived with the help of his supernatural digestive system, that came to an end with his death.

== Popular culture ==
=== Fantasy ===
In modern fantasy worlds, whose background and setting sometimes draw heavily on real-world myths, similar or compatible concepts of a Golden Age exist in the said world's prehistory; when deities or elf-like creatures existed, before the coming of humans.

For example, in The Silmarillion by J. R. R. Tolkien, a Golden Age exists in Middle-earth legendarium. Arda (the world where The Lord of the Rings is set), was designed to be symmetrical and perfect. After the wars of the Gods, Arda lost its perfect shape (known as Arda Unmarred) and was called Arda Marred. Another kind of 'Golden Age' follows later, after the Elves awoke; the Eldar stay on Valinor, live with the Valar and advance in arts and knowledge, until the rebellion and the fall of the Noldor, reminiscent of the Fall of Man. Eventually, after the end of the world, the Silmarilli will be recovered and the light of the Two Trees of Valinor rekindled. Arda will be remade again as Arda Healed.

In The Wheel of Time universe, the "Age of Legends" is the name given to the previous Age: In this society, channelers were common and Aes Sedai – trained channelers – were extremely powerful, able to make angreal, sa'angreal, and ter'angreal, and holding important civic positions. The Age of Legends is seen as a utopian society without war or crime, and devoted to culture and learning. Aes Sedai were frequently devoted to academic endeavours, one of which inadvertently resulted in a hole – The Bore – being drilled in the Dark One's prison. The immediate effects were not realised, but the Dark One gradually asserted power over humanity, swaying many to become his followers. This resulted in the War of Power and eventually the Breaking of the World.

Another example is in the background of the Lands of Lore classic computer game, where the history of the Lands is divided in Ages. One of them is also called the Golden Age, a time when the Lands were ruled by the 'Ancients', and there were no wars. This age ended with the 'War of the Heretics'.

The Golden Age may also refer to a state of early childhood. Herbert Spencer argued that young children progress through the cognitive stages of evolution of the human species and of human civilization, thereby linking pre-civilization and infancy. Kenneth Grahame called his evocation of early childhood 'The Golden Age' and J. M. Barrie's fictional character Peter Pan, who first appeared in 'The Little White Bird' was named after Pan, a Greek god from the Golden Age. Barrie's further works about Peter Pan depict early childhood as a time of pre-civilised naturalness and happiness, which is destroyed by the subsequent process of education.

=== Present-day usage ===
The term "Golden Age" is at present frequently used in the context of a specific time in the history of a particular country – such as the "Spanish Golden Age", "Dutch Golden Age", "Danish Golden Age", "Golden Age of Flanders" – or the history of a specific field – "Golden age of alpinism", "Golden Age of American Animation", "Golden Age of Comics", "Golden Age of Science Fiction", "Golden Age of Television", "Golden Age of Hollywood", "Golden age of arcade video games", "Golden Age of Radio", "Golden Age of Hip-Hop", "Golden Age of Kamishibai Theater" (in Japan) and even "Golden Age of Piracy" or "Golden Age of Porn". Usually, the term "Golden Age" is bestowed retroactively, when the period in question has ended and is compared with what followed in the specific field discussed. The term has also been used prospectively. The term has shown steady, slightly decreasing usage between 2004 and 2025.

== See also ==
- Age of Aquarius
- Golden ages of China
- Golden Age of India
- Golden Age of Jewish culture in Spain
- Belle Époque
- Pax Romana
- American Century
- 2012 phenomenon
- Ages of Man
- Arcadia (utopia)
- Eschatology
- Garden of Eden
- Golden Liberty (in Polish history)
- Great year
- Khalistan
- Merrie England
- Messianic Age
- Millennialism
- New world order (Baháʼí)
- Olympic medals
- Paradise
- Precession of the Equinoxes/African humid period
- Satya Yuga
- Utopia
- Islamic Golden Age
- World to Come
