= Édouard de Moreau =

Édouard Marie Ignace Ghislain de Moreau (1879–1952) was a Jesuit ecclesiastical historian from Belgium.

== Life ==
Moreau was born in Wierde (province of Namur) on 26 August 1879, the seventh of the eight children of Baron Alphonse de Moreau and Gabrielle de Grand'Ry. He was educated at the Jesuit college in Brussels and in 1896, aged 17, entered the Jesuit novitiate at Drongen Abbey. He went on to study humanities at the Collège Notre-Dame de la Paix in Namur and scholastic philosophy in Leuven. From 1904 to 1907 he studied history at the Catholic University of Leuven, under Victor Brants, Charles Moeller and Alfred Cauchie. He went on to write a doctoral thesis about the religious and economic history of Villers Abbey in the 12th and 13th centuries (1909), while teaching at the recently founded St Michael College, Brussels.

From 1908 to 1912 he completed his formation in Theology, during which he was ordained priest. After a year in the German Jesuit house at Exaten in the Netherlands he became professor of Church history at the Jesuit house of studies in Leuven. He remained based there from 1913 until shortly before his death in 1952, except for brief periods in 1914 and 1940. Early in the First World War he worked as a military chaplain, and in 1940 he served as superior for the Belgian Jesuit refugees in France. In the 1920s he also taught a course on Church history at the École supérieure de jeunes filles in Brussels, and in 1935 he served on an archdiocesan committee to examine claims of Marian apparitions. He died in Leuven on 2 March 1952.
