= Dirk Imhof =

Dirk Imhof (born 1961) is a Belgian book historian, author and museum curator specializing in rare books and rare maps of Renaissance Europe, particularly the activities and output of Christopher Plantin and his successor Jan Moretus at the Plantin Press in 16th-century Antwerp.

== Biography ==
Imhof was born in 1961. He is a Belgian citizen of Flemish ethnicity. His father was an employee of Belgacom, the Belgian telecom company. He is married to Karen Lee Bowen, an American specialist on the history of engraving and old master prints.

Imhof studied classical philology at the University of Ghent and went on to obtain a doctorate in history from the University of Antwerp. He then worked as curator of books and archives at the Plantin-Moretus Museum, a world heritage site in Antwerp, Belgium.

== Bibliography ==
Imhof has published in both Dutch (his native language) and English. His books include:

- Christopher Plantin and Engraved Book Illustrations in Sixteenth-Century Europe (with Karen L. Bowen, Cambridge University Press, 2008)
- Jan Moretus and the Continuation of the Plantin Press (2 vols., Brill, 2014)
- Abraham Ortelius (1527–1598) In de ban van de klassieke oudheid (with Hildegard Van de Velde, Museum Rockoxhuis, 2015)
