= Alfons Thijs =

Belgian historian

Alfons K. L. Thijs
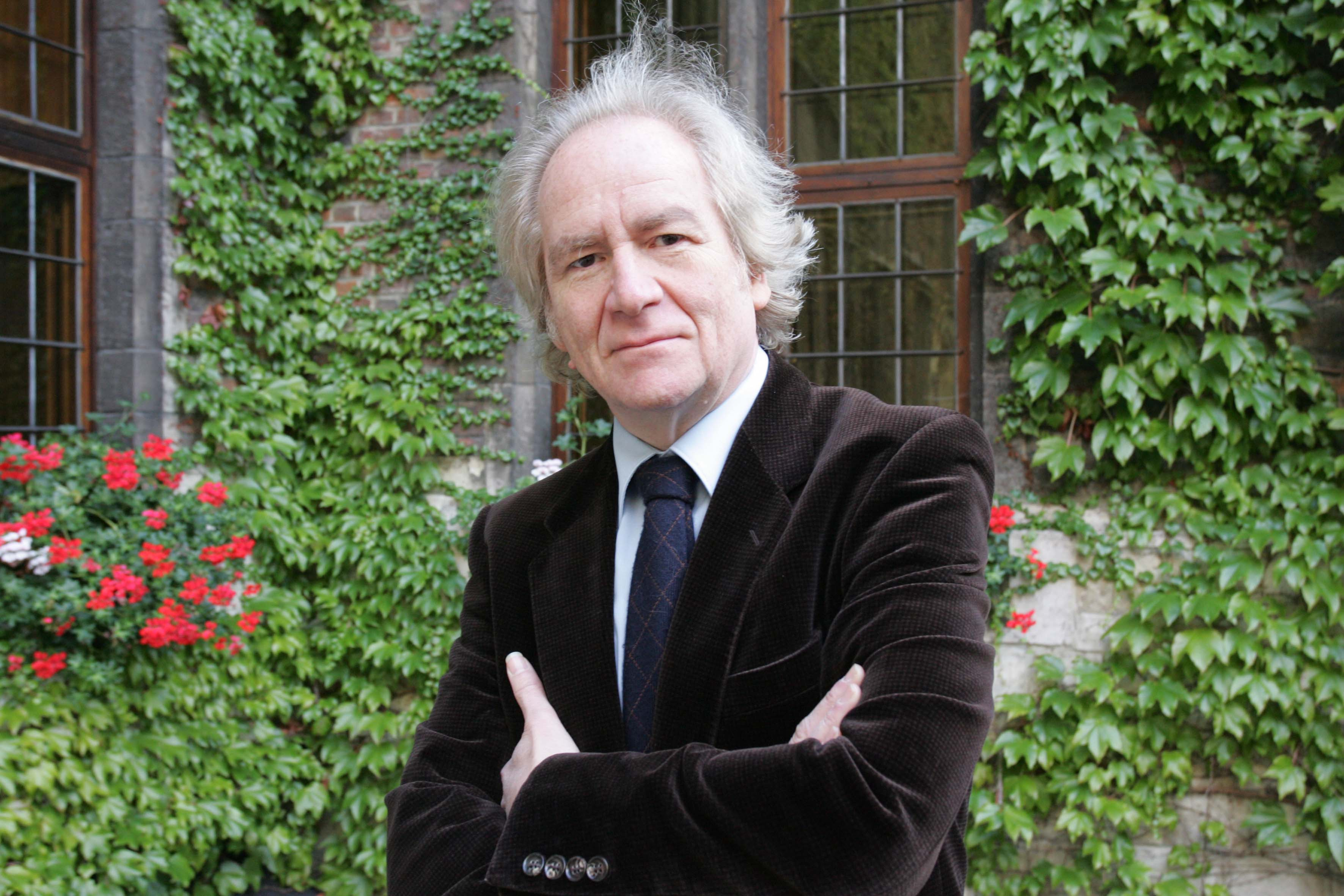
- Born: 22 March 1944; Antwerp
- Died: 14 January 2014 (aged 69); Borgerhout
- Spouse: Ilse Eggers

Academic background
- Education: University of Antwerp, Ghent University
- Thesis: Van Werkwinkel tot Fabriek: De textielnijverheid te Antwerpen van het einde der vijftiende eeuw tot het begin der negentiende eeuw (1978)
- Doctoral advisor: Wilfrid Brulez

Academic work
- Discipline: History
- Sub-discipline: Business history; history of religion
- Institutions: University of Antwerp
- Main interests: textile industry; devotional ephemera

Alfons K. L. Thijs (1944–2014) was a Belgian historian of the early-modern Low Countries. His earlier work focused on social and economic history, his later work on cultural and religious history, particularly popular devotional ephemera such as prayer cards.

== Career ==
Thijs was born in Antwerp on 22 March 1944. After studying in Antwerp as an undergraduate he went to Ghent University as a graduate student, obtaining his licentiate degree and doctorate there under the supervision of Wilfrid Brulez. His licentiate thesis studied silk production in Antwerp in the 17th century, his doctoral thesis the textile industry more broadly. From 1971 to 2004 he was a member of the academic staff of the University of Antwerp, initially as an assistant (1971-1978), then lecturer (1978-1988), and finally professor (1988 onwards). From 1982 to 1991 he served as director of the Centrum voor Bedrijfsgeschiedenis (Centre for Business History). A Festschrift was published for his retirement in 2004. He died on 14 January 2014, in the Borgerhout district of Antwerp.

== Thijs Collection ==
A large selection from his personal collection of devotional prints was acquired by the University of Antwerp in 2014 and entrusted to the Ruusbroec Institute as the Thijs Collection. Several of these pieces have been digitised and are available on Wikimedia.

== Works ==
- De zijdenijverheid te Antwerpen in de 17de eeuw (Brussels, 1969)
- Van werkwinkel tot fabriek: De textielnijverheid te Antwerpen (Brussels, 1987)
- Van Geuzenstad tot katholiek bolwerk: Maatschappelijke betekenis van de Kerk in contrareformatorisch Antwerpen (Turnhout, 1990)
- Antwerpen, internationaal uitgeverscentrum van devotieprenten, 17de-18de eeuw (Leuven, 1993)
- with Hugo Soly (eds), Minorities in Western European Cities (Sixteenth-Twentieth Centuries) (Brussels, 1995)
- with Prosper Arents and Frans Susanna Emanuel Baudouin, De bibliotheek van Pieter Pauwel Rubens: Een reconstructie (Antwerp, 2001)
- with Karen Lee Bowen, Marian Pilgrimage Sites in Brabant: A Bibliography (Leuven, 2008)
- Komt pelgrims, komt hier: Devotioneel drukwerk voor bedevaartsplaatsen in Vlaanderen en Brabant (1500-1850) (Leuven, 2020), edited by Jonas Van Mulder, with the assistance of Ilse Eggers, Daniël Ermens, and Erna Van Looveren.
