= T'Kint de Roodenbeke =

Belgian noble family

t'Kint de Roodenbeke t'Kint
- noble family
- Country: Holy Roman Empire Austrian Netherlands Kingdom of Belgium
- Origin: Baadergem, East Flanders
- Titles: Count; Baron
- Motto: Perseverando
- Estates: Ooidonk Castle, Deinze, East Flanders

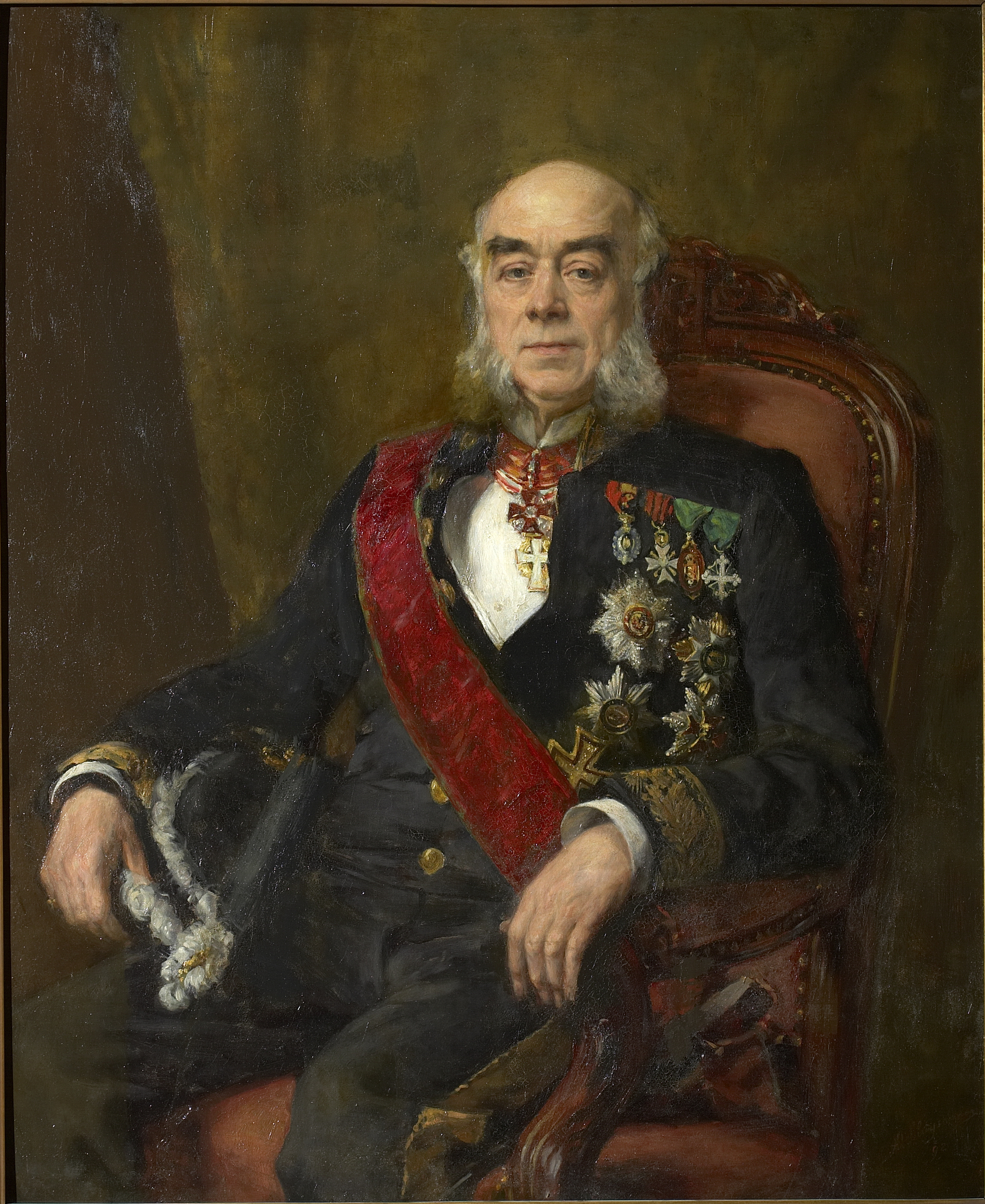
Henri t' Kint de Roodenbeke, President of the Senate of Belgium

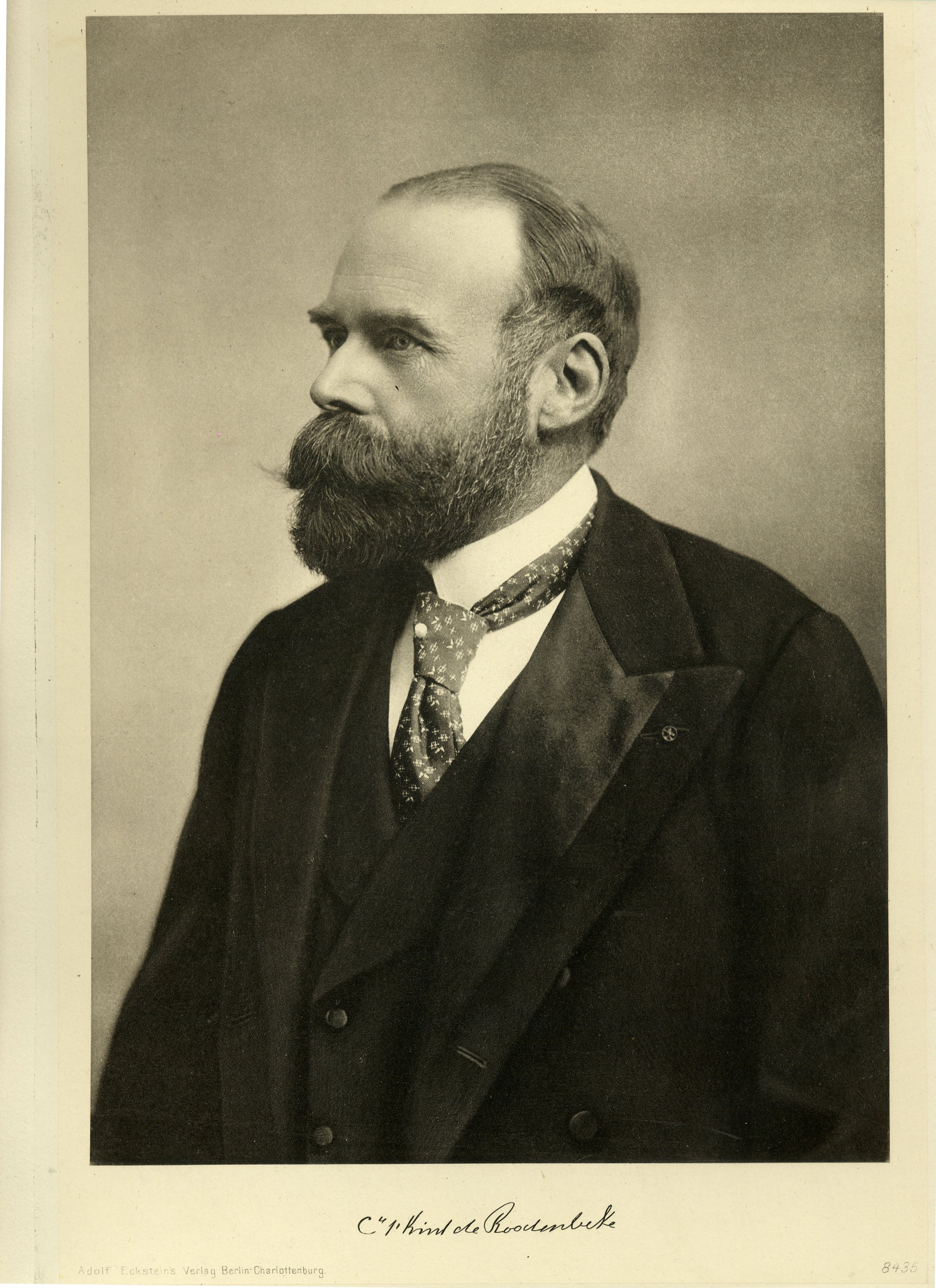
Comte Arnold T'Kint de Roodenbeke

t'Kint de Roodenbeke is a bourgeois and noble family from Belgium. They are the current owners of the Ooidonk Castle in the city of Deinze, East Flanders.

== History ==
At first the families of t'Kint and de Roodenbeke were separate families, both from the Brussels region and predominantly active in the textile industry of the eighteenth century.

The de Roodenbeke family was one of the Seven Noble Houses of Brussels, forming the patrician class of that city to whom special privileges in the government were granted until the end of the Ancien Régime. While not one of the original seven families, t'Kint was granted membership through the female lineage of de Roodenbeke marrying into the t'Kint family.

Several members have been deans of guilds or have held public office as councilor or vice-mayor as members of the Brussels Nations, or alderman as a member of the Noble Houses.

Some members were ennobled in the eighteenth century.

The first one carrying the combined name of t'Kint de Roodenbeke was Corneille, born in 1720 in Brussels. Today both names still exist separately, as well as combined.

== Alliances ==
- van der Borcht
- de Borja de Silva y Borchgrave d'Altena
- Ellinckhuyzen
- van der Meeren
- Peers de Nieuwburgh

== See also ==
- List of noble families in Belgium
- Bourgeois of Brussels
- Seven Noble Houses of Brussels
