= Wilfrid Brulez =

Belgian historian (1927–2023)

Wilfrid Brulez (27 February 1927 – 23 March 2023) was a Belgian economic historian with a particular interest in the Habsburg Netherlands' international trade, particularly with Italy, and diplomatic relations with the Holy See. His in-depth study of the merchant house headed by Jean della Faille and Martin della Faille in 16th-century Antwerp fundamentally changed the perception of native involvement in international trade during Antwerp's Golden Age. It also led Fernand Braudel to change his view of the relative importance of land routes and sea routes between northern and southern Europe around 1600.

Brulez was born in Blankenberge, West Flanders on 27 February 1927. From 1963 he taught at Ghent University, becoming a full professor on 1 May 1971. He retired on 1 October 1987, and died at his home in Sint-Martens-Latem, East-Flanders, on 23 March 2023, at the age of 96.

== Works ==
- Correspondance de Richard Pauli-Stravius, 1634-1642 (Brussels, 1955)
- Correspondance de Martino Alfieri, 1634-1639 (Brussels, 1956)
- De firma della Faille en de internationale handel van Vlaamse firma's in de 16e eeuw (Brussels, 1959)
- with Greta Devos, Marchands flamands à Venise (2 vols., Brussels, 1965-1986)
- The Balance of Trade of the Netherlands (Ghent, 1970)
- Cultuur en getal: aspecten van de relatie economie-maatschappij-cultuur in Europa tussen 1400 en 1800 (Amsterdam, 1986)
