= Victor Gaillard =

Belgian activist

Victor Louis Marie Gaillard (1825–1856) was a Belgian lawyer, numismatist, historian and archivist.

== Life ==
Gaillard was born in Ghent on 28 May 1825 and studied at Ghent University, graduating doctor of law at the age of 21. Although called to the bar he dedicated much of his time to historical research, and especially to his collection of medals. In 1847 he married Léontine Rycx; the couple spent their honeymoon on a tour through Germany, Switzerland, France and Italy. His first publication as a historian was an article on Ghent's medieval grain staple, in the Messager des sciences historiques. He went on to publish extensively on medieval commerce, coins, and fairs, as well as on the history of the Council of Flanders, and Guy of Dampierre's expedition to Tunis in 1270. He was appointed conservator of the archives of the Council of Flanders. Besides the Messager des sciences historiques he also published in Annales de la Société d'Emulation de Bruges, the Revue numismatique belge, Bulletin de la Commission royale d'histoire, Annales de la Société royale des Beaux-Arts, Bulletin du bibliophile belge, and Eendragt. He died on 10 September 1856.

== Publications ==
- Expédition de Gui de Dampièrre à Tunis, en 1270 (1833)
- Recherches sur les monnaies des comtes de Flandre, depuis les temps les plus reculés jusqu'au règne de Robert de Bethune inclusivement (1852)
- Épitaphes des Néerlandais (Belges et Hollandais) enterrés à Rome (1853)
- De l'influence exercée par la Belgique sur les Provinces-Unies, sous le rapport politique, commercial, industriel, artistique et littéraire depuis l'abdication de Charles-Quint jusqu'à la paix de Munster (1855)
- Archives du conseil de Flandre, ou Recueil de documents inédits relatifs à l'histoire politique, judiciaire, artistique et littéraire (1855)
- Inventaire analytique des chartes des comtes de Flandre: autrefois déposées au chateau de Rupelmonde et récemment retrouvées aux archives à l'ancien conseil de Flandre à Gand (1857)
