= Victor Brants =

Belgian economic and social historian

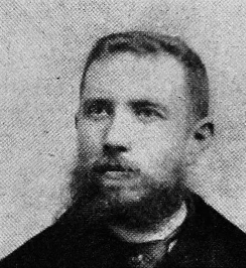
- Born: Victor Leopold Jacques Louis Brants; 23 November 1856; Antwerp, Belgium
- Died: 28 April 1917 (aged 60); Leuven, Belgium
- Occupation: Academic

Victor Leopold Jacques Louis Brants (1856–1917) was a Belgian economic and social historian, professor at the Catholic University of Leuven.

== Life ==
Brants was born in Antwerp on 23 November 1856. He taught at the Catholic University of Leuven from 1878, and was appointed professor in 1888. In 1882 he founded the Société Belge d'Économie Sociale. After the public unrest of 1886, the government headed by Auguste Beernaert appointed Brants to a commission on the condition of the labouring classes, giving him considerable influence on social legislation. He was a deeply committed social Catholic.

At the university, he taught on political economy, social economy, credit, exchange and finance, labour legislation, and history. As a historian his work focused on economic and monetary legislation in the Habsburg Netherlands. He was an active member of the Royal Commission for the publication of the old laws of the Low Countries, and a contributor to the Biographie Nationale de Belgique and the Catholic Encyclopaedia.

In 1895 he was elected a corresponding member of the Royal Academy of Science, Letters and Fine Arts of Belgium, and in 1899 a full member.

Displaced by the Sack of Leuven in 1914, he lived as a refugee in Brussels, where he fell into isolation and poverty. He died while undergoing pulmonary surgery without anaesthetic in Leuven on 28 April 1917, offering up his suffering with his eyes fixed on an image of Christ.

== Works ==
- Histoire des classes rurales aux Pays-Bas jusqu'à la fin du XVIIIe siècle (Brussels, 1881)
- Propriété et communauté dans le droit athénien (Leuven, 1882)
- Les formes juridiques de l'exploitation du sol dans l'ancienne attique (1883)
- L'économie politique au Moyen-Age: esquisse des théories économiques professées par les écrivains des XIIIe et XIVe siècles (Louvain, 1895)
- La Législation autrichienne sur le dimanche dans l'industrie et le commerce privés (Leuven, 1897)
- L'autonomie internationale de la Belgique sous les archiducs Albert et Isabelle, 1598-1621 (Mâcon, 1901)
- La Petite industrie contemporaine (Paris, 1902)
- La Faculté de Droit de l'Université de Louvain à travers cinq siècles, 1426-1906 (Leuven, 1906)
- La description des Pays-Bas de Don Jorge de Henin, 1628 (Brussels, 1907)
- La lutte contre l'usure dans les lois modernes (Paris, 1907)
- Recueil des ordonnances des Pays-Bas: Règne d'Albert et Isabelle, 1597-1621 (2 vols., Brussels, 1909-1912)
- La Belgique au XVIIe siècle: Albert et Isabelle: études d'histoire politique et sociale (Leuven, 1910)
- Un défenseur du droit des indigènes aux colonies du XVI siècle: Fr. de Victoria, 1480-1546 (Brussels, 1912)
- Les grandes lignes de l'économie politique (Paris, 1913)
- Le Prince de Machiavel dans les anciens Pays-Bas (Leuven, 1914)
- Recueil des ordonnances des Pays-Bas. 2e série, 1506-1700: Les ordonnances monétaires du XVIIe siècle (Brussels, 1914)
