= Guillaume de Vottem =

14th-century Benedictine prior and chronicler

Guillaume de Vottem (died 1403) was a Benedictine monk and prior of the Abbey of St James the Less in Liège.

== Life and Work ==
Guillaume served as the prior of the Benedictine community at Saint-Jacques in Liège until his death in 1403. He is primarily remembered as a chronicler. A Latin chronicle completing history up to 1402, titled Chronicon de schismate Urbani papae et Petri de Luna (dealing heavily with the contemporary Western Schism), has been historically ascribed to his authorship.

The work survives via a 16th-century manuscript currently preserved in the Royal Library of Belgium. His contributions highlight the role of the Abbey of St James as a prominent center of intellectual activity and historical record-keeping in the Prince-Bishopric of Liège during the early 15th century.
