= Arthur De Schrevel =

Belgian priest and historian (1850–1934)

Arthur Carolus De Schrevel (1850–1934) was a Belgian priest and historian, specialising in the 16th and 17th centuries, and in particular Catholic Church history during the Dutch Revolt. He was also a prolific contributor to the Biographie Nationale de Belgique.

== Life ==
De Schrevel was born in Wervik on 5 January 1850, the son of Dr Ivon De Schrevel and Melanie Liebaert. He studied Theology at the Catholic University of Leuven and was ordained priest in Bruges on 7 June 1873. On 10 September 1877 he was appointed professor at Bruges seminary, becoming director on 18 August 1880. From 26 July 1889 he was an honorary canon of Bruges cathedral. In 1894 he became secretary to Bishop Waffelaert and a titular canon of the cathedral. In 1905 he was appointed archpriest of the cathedral, and in 1911 vicar general of the diocese. He retired in March 1931, and died in Bruges on 18 April 1934. His funeral service took place in the cathedral on 23 April 1934.

== Publications ==
- Histoire du séminaire de Bruges (2 vols., 1883)
- Documents relatifs à l'histoire du Séminaire de Bruges (1883)
- Le collège de Ruard Tapper à Louvain (1887)
- Florilegium seu fasciculus precum et exercitiorum (1892)
- Gaspar de la Torre, XXXIIIme prévot de Notre-Dame à Bruges: son testament (1892)
- Troubles religieux du XVIme siècle au quartier du Bruges, 1566-1568 (1894)
- Remi Drieux, évêque de Bruges et les troubles des Pays-Bas (2 vols., 1901-1903)
- Statuts de la gilde des libraires, imprimeurs, maîtres et maîtresses d'école, à Bruges, 19 janvier 1612 (1903; 2nd ed. 1908)
- Les gloires de la Flandre maritime et de la Flandre gallicante au XVIe siècle, lecture de A. C. De Schrevel à l'occasion du cinquantenaire du Comité flamand de France (1904)
- Histoire du petit séminaire de Roulers précédée d'une introduction ou coup d'oeil sur l'état de l'enseignement moyen dans la région correspondant à la Flandre occidentale actuelle (1906)
- Comment disparut le trésor de la Cathédrale de St-Donatien à Bruges en 1578-1579 (1909)
- Etablissement et débuts des Carmes déchaussés à Bruges (1910)
- Le protestantisme à Ypres et dans les environs de 1578 à 1584 d'après des comptes contemporains (1913)
- Le traité d'alliance conclu en 1339 entre la Flandre et le Brabant renouvelé en 1578 (1914)
- Recueil de documents relatifs aux troubles religieux en Flandre, 1577-1584 (2 vols., 1921-1924)
- Marguerite d'Autriche et le couvent des Annonciades à Bruges (1924)
- Notes et documents pour servir à la biographie de Remi Drieux, IIe évèque de Bruges: relation sur l'état de son diocèse en 1589 (1931)
