= Randall Lesaffer =

Belgian historian of international law (born 1968)

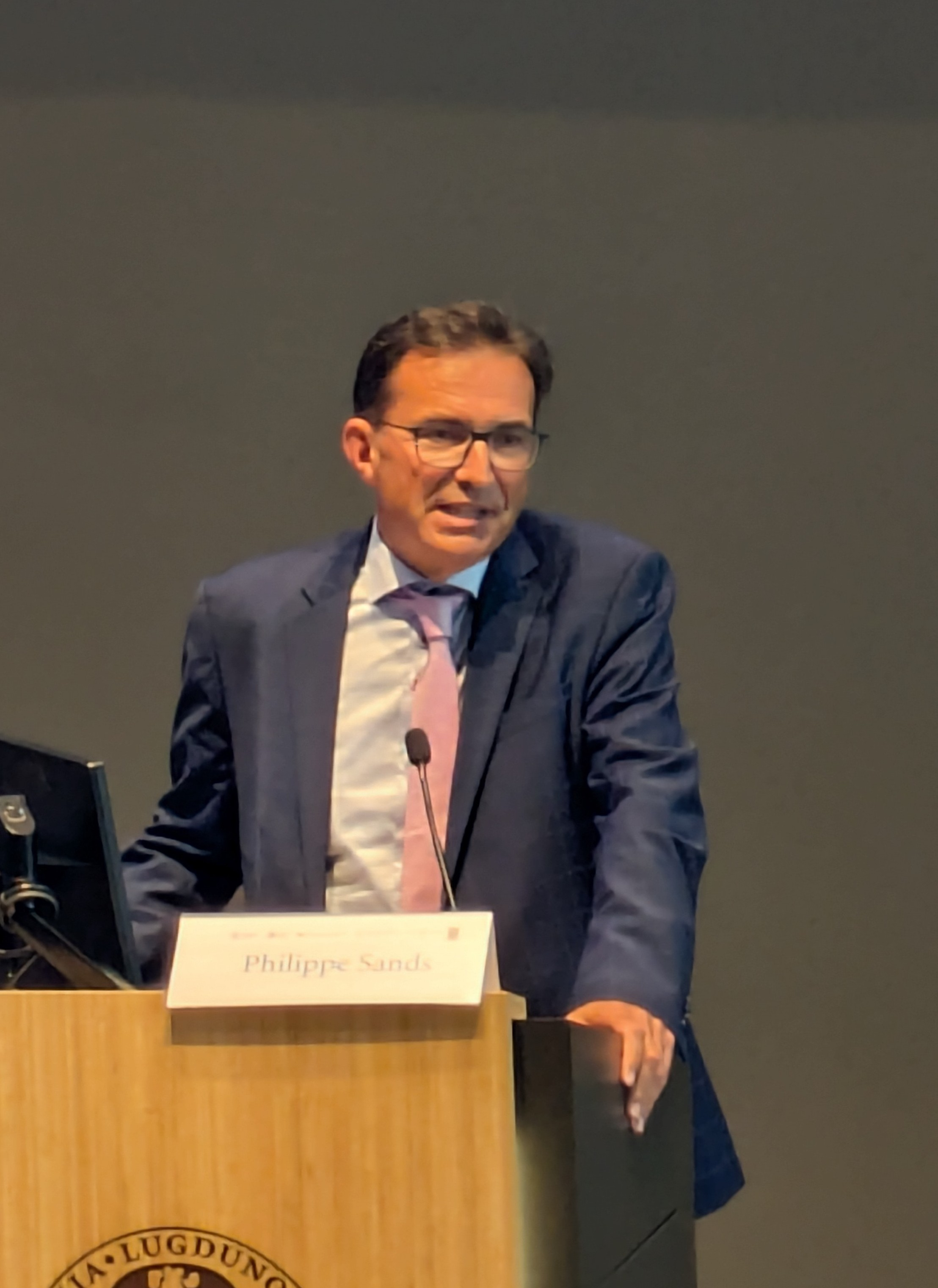
Image of Randall Lesaffer

Randall Christoph Herman Lesaffer (born 25 April 1968) is a Belgian historian of international law. He has been professor of legal history at KU Leuven since 1998 and at Tilburg University since 1999, where he also served as dean of Tilburg Law School from 2008 to 2012. He currently serves as the head of the Department of Roman Law and Legal History at the Faculty of Law and Criminology at KU Leuven. His work focuses on the Early Modern Age (16-18th centuries).

== Career ==
Lesaffer was born in 1968 in Bruges, the town where he continues to live. He studied law as well as history at the universities of Ghent and Leuven (University of Leuven), both in Belgium. In 1998, he obtained his PhD in law from the Leuven on a study on early-modern and Cold War peace and alliance treaties. Since 1998 he has been part-time professor of legal history at KU leuven, and full-time since 2019, where he also serves as the head of the Department of Roman Law and Legal History. He is also professor of legal history at Tilburg University, since 1999 (part-time since 2019).

Lesaffer's work on the history (particularly, in early-modern Europe) as well as recent developments of international law, in the context of international relations and policy. He is currently involved, with writing a political history of international law at the end of the Cold War.

He also publishes on general European legal history and constitutional history. He is among others author of European Legal History: A Political and Cultural Perspective by Cambridge University Press.

Lesaffer has published extensively in the field of the history of international law, particularly in early-modern Europe. Lesaffer is

- the editor of the Oxford Historical Treaties, a digitisation of historical treaties,
- general editor of the book series Studies in the History of International Law (Brill),
- editor of the Global Law Series (Cambridge UP),
- editor of the Journal of the History of International Law,
- president of the Grotiana foundation (Stichting Grotiana),
- general editor of the Cambridge History of International Law (15 volumes planned).

Lesaffer was dean of Tilburg Law School from 2008 to 2012. During his term the school launched an English-taught Bachelor in Law on ‘Global Law’ and made globalisation the core of its strategy. Lesaffer co-founded the Law Schools Global League in 2012 and was one of its two founding presidents. The League is an association of about 25 law schools from all over the world to work around globalisation. He is also visiting professor at the Católica Global Law School in Lisbon.

He has been actively involved in local politics in Bruges since the 1990s. He was chairman of the VLD (liberal party) in Bruges from 1993 to 2001 and served as a member of the city-council for CD&V in 2011-2012. He was a member and vice-president of the Port Authority of the harbour of Bruges-Zeebruges from 1999 till 2014.

== Publications ==
His main publications are:

- Peace treaties and international law in European history. From the Late Middle Ages to World War One, Cambridge University Press, 2008
- European Legal History: A Cultural and Political Perspective, Cambridge, Cambridge University Press, 2009 (2nd and 3rd print 2010, ISBN 978-0-521-87798-5), a textbook on legal history in general.
- Moet vrede rechtvaardig zijn? Het vredesconcept in de historische ontwikkeling van het internationaal recht, Inaugural lecture in occasion of the acceptance of the Chair of Legal History at Tilburg University, Tilburg University Press, 1999 (ISBN 90-3619690-6)
- Europa: een zoektocht naar vrede? Het klassieke statensysteem in vredes- en alliantieverdragen (1453-1763 en 1945-1997), Leuven University Press, 1999 (ISBN 90-6186953-6)
- Inleiding tot de Europese Rechtsgeschiedenis, Leuven, University Press, 2004 (ISBN 90-5867416-9), 2de herziene uitgave 2008.

== Literature ==
- John Fabian Witt, A Social History of International Law: Historical Commentary, 1861-1900 in David L. Sloss et alii (eds), International Law in the US Supreme Court. Continuity and Change (Cambridge 2011), pp. 164–87.
- Prof Eduard Somers, Laudatio of Prof. Randall Lesaffer, at the presentation of the George Sarton Medal 2012-2013 of the University of Ghent
