= Martin della Faille =

Martin della Faille (1544–1620) was a merchant of Antwerp who by the end of the sixteenth century had become one of the richest men in Europe.

== Life ==
Martin was born in Antwerp, the son of Jean della Faille, one of the leading merchants of the day. He worked for his father in London and Hamburg, and in 1582 succeeded him as head of the family firm. In 1587 he was captured by Dutch freebooters and sold to the English, who released him after payment of a massive ransom. From 1587 onwards he was retrenching on business operations and investing in land.

In 1565 he married Sibille Stecher (died 1589), daughter of the Swabian merchant Georg Stecher. Together they had six sons, including Jean, Georges, Charles, and Etienne.

In 1596 Della Faille entered government service as a member of the Admiralty Council, and from 1600 was loaning money to the Brussels court. He was involved in the negotiations that led to the 1604 Treaty of London, and received a patent of nobility and the title of baron in 1614.
