= Golden Age of Flanders =

The Golden Age of Flanders, or Flemish Golden Age, is a term that has been used to describe the flourishing of cultural and economic activities of the Low Countries around the 16th century. The term Flanders in the 16th century referred to the entire Habsburg Netherlands within the Burgundian Circle of the Holy Roman Empire. It was inclusive of modern-day Belgium, the Netherlands, and Luxembourg. Its political capital was Brussels, while the financial-economic centre was Antwerp. Other major artistic and cultural centres of the period included Bruges, Ghent, Mechelen and Leuven. It is also grouped with the Dutch Golden Age, a more common term used primarily in reference to the Dutch Republic, and typically dated from 1588 to 1672, within a "Flemish and Dutch golden age" covering the period from the late 15th to the 17th century.

== History ==
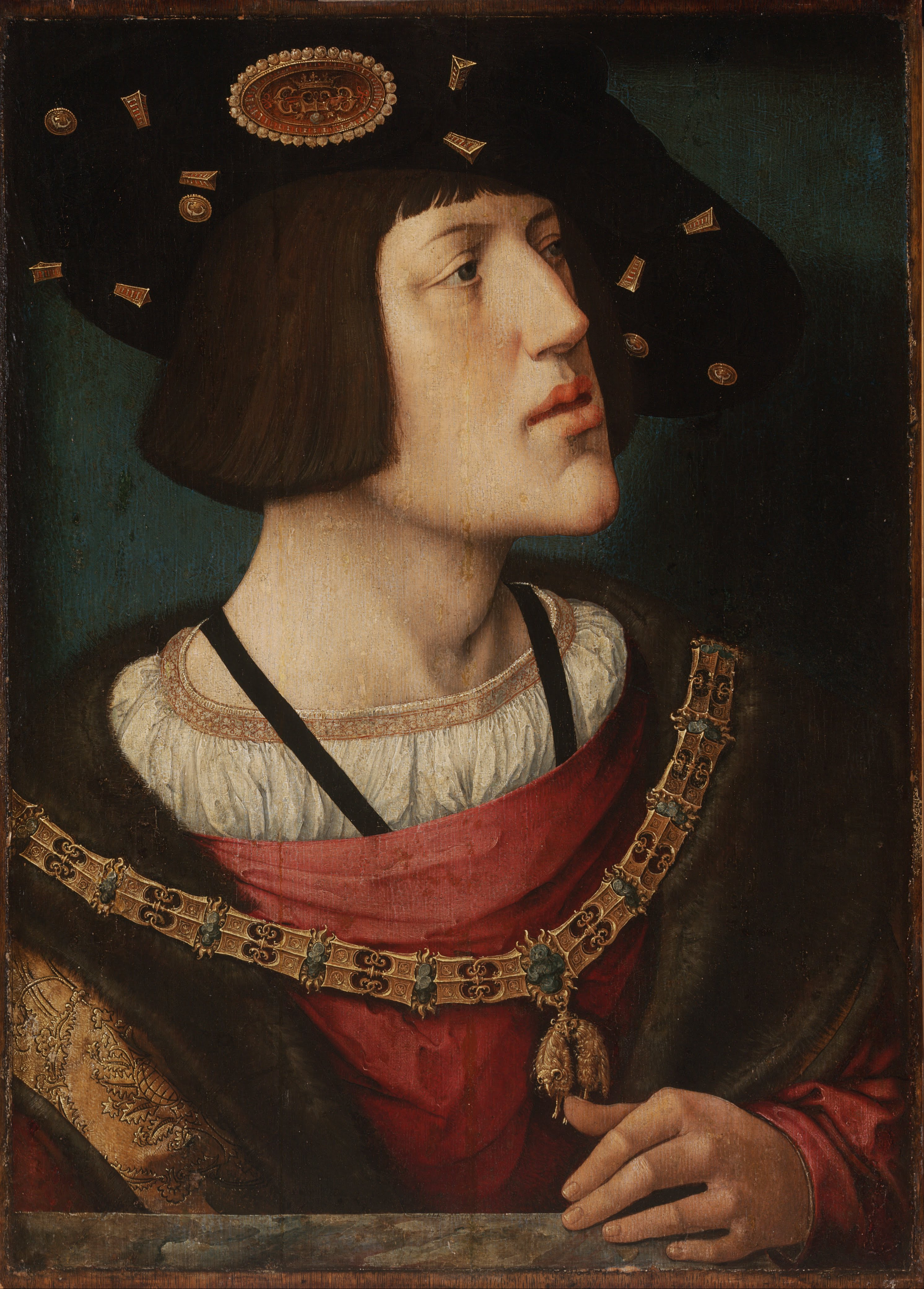
Portrait of Charles of Ghent by Bernard van Orley, 1519. The insignia of the Order of the Golden Fleece are prominently displayed.

On 24 February 1500, Charles of Ghent was born to Philip the Handsome (son of Mary of Burgundy and Maximilian I of Austria) and Joanna the Mad (daughter of Isabella of Castille and Ferdinand II of Aragon). Charles eventually inherited the four crowns of Burgundy (1506), Castile (1516), Aragon (1516), and Austria (1519).

The inheritances of Burgundy and Austria made him respectively Lord of the Netherlands and Archduke of Austria, giving to one person an unprecedented amount of direct possessions within the Holy Roman Empire. The inheritances of Castile and Aragon formed a Spanish empire that stretched from the Castilian West Indies to the Aragonese Two Sicilies. The election as Holy Roman Emperor in 1519 crowned Charles' dynastic fortunes, giving him sovereignty in Germany and North Italy as a formal successor of Charlemagne. Charles was also heir of the imperial idea of the House of Austria: A.E.I.O.U ("Austria Est Imperare Orbi Universo", it is Austria's destiny to rule the world). In an age of High Renaissance and global explorations, when reformed churches and national monarchies were emerging, Charles embraced the medieval dream of building a universal monarchy in the Old World of Christendom.

Given that Charles was a Fleming and that Burgundian chivalric culture formed the basis of his beliefs, Brussels would ascend from capital of the Habsburg Netherlands to main seat of his itinerant court. Having added Spanish Mexico, German Venezuela, Spanish Peru, the Duchy of Milan, and the kingdoms of Hungary and Bohemia to his composite monarchy, he styled himself as the ruler of an empire on which the sun never sets.

Charles V also expanded the Netherlands' territory. He first added Tournai and the Tournaisis, under French influence until 1521. In 1524, Friesland was conquered and renamed Lordship of Frisia. During the Guelders Wars Charles annexed the Lordship of Utrecht and Lordship of Overijssel, the Lordship of Groningen and County of Drenthe. In 1543, Charles V finally obtained the Duchy of Guelders and the County of Zutphen. With the Pragmatic Sanction of 1549, all Low Countries' territories were merged into the Seventeen Provinces.

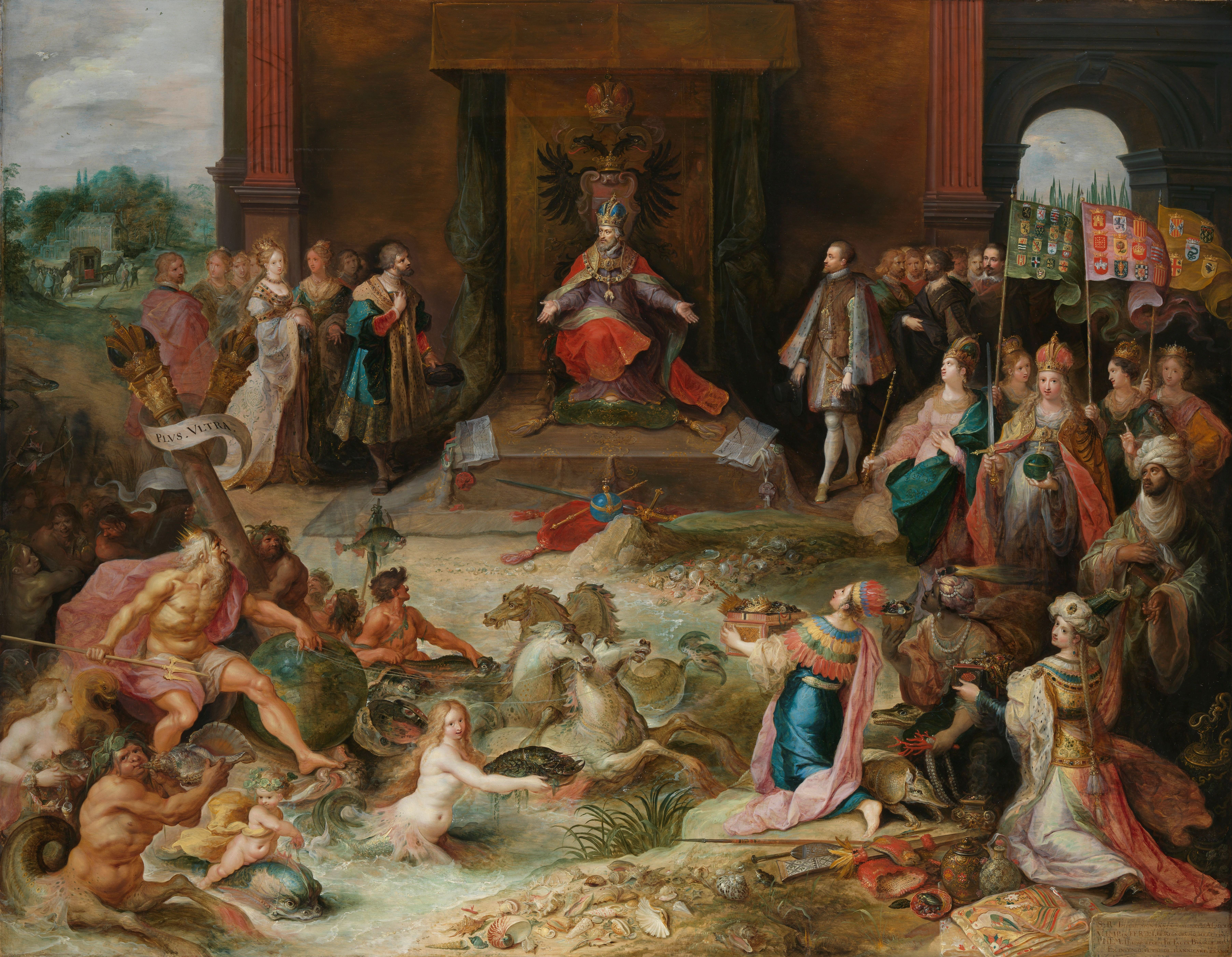
Allegory on Emperor Charles V's abdication in Brussels by Frans Francken the Younger. Charles divided his empire between Philip II of Spain and Emperor Ferdinand I. Philip II of Spain received the Low Countries and made them a province of the Spanish Empire.

However, the abdications of Brussels formalized by Charles V between 1554 and 1556 divided the House of Habsburg and its possessions between a Spanish branch led by Philip II of Spain and a German-Austrian branch led by Ferdinand I, Holy Roman Emperor. Charles abdicated in favor of his son Philip the Two Sicilies and the Duchy of Milan in July 1554, the Habsburg Netherlands in October 1555, and the kingdoms of Spain and the Americas in January 1556. Philip was secretly made Duke of Milan already in 1540. He will also inherit Portugal in 1580. In August 1556, Charles abdicated the throne of the Holy Roman Empire of the German Nation in favor of his younger brother Ferdinand, elected as his designated successor in 1531. The Imperial succession also marked the legal transfer of the Austrian hereditary lands of the Empire to Ferdinand, who ruled them in the name of the Emperor since 1521.

At his last public speech in front of the States General, Charles famously said "my life has been one long journey". His son Philip will return in Spain in 1559 and never visit the Low Countries again, ruling these territories as King of Spain rather than Duke of Burgundy. Flanders and Belgium were part of the Spanish Netherlands from 1556, and entered a period of decline in favor of the Dutch Republic which was soon to break off from the Spanish Empire. Symbolic of this is the Sack of Antwerp by Spanish forces in 1576, which forced many merchants to flee to Amsterdam and Holland. The Dutch Golden Age lasted for most of the 17th century.

== Economy ==
The size of Charles' empire made the port city of Antwerp "the centre of the entire international economy" Antwerp was the richest city in Europe at this time. Antwerp's golden age is tightly linked to the fact that it became the financial centre where Spanish precious metals coming from the Americas were exchanged for banking credit of rich German families (namely the Fugger and the Welser). During the first half of the 16th century Antwerp grew to become the second-largest European city north of the Alps. Many foreign merchants were resident in the city. Francesco Guicciardini, the Florentine envoy, stated that hundreds of ships would pass in a day, and 2,000 carts entered the city each week.

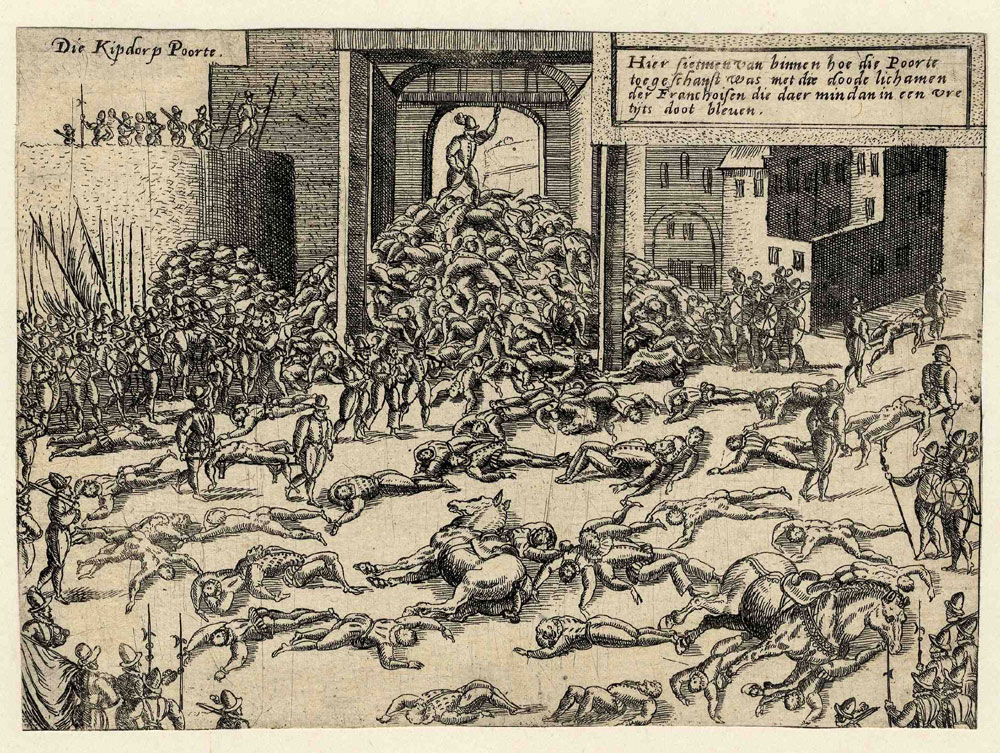
Sack of Antwerp in 1576, in which about 7,000 people died.

By 1504, the Portuguese had established Antwerp as one of their main shipping bases, bringing in spices from Asia and trading them for textiles and metal goods. The city's trade expanded to include cloth from England, Italy and Germany, wines from Germany, France and Spain, salt from France, and wheat from the Baltic. The city's skilled workers processed soap, fish, sugar, and especially cloth. Banks helped finance the trade, the merchants, and the manufacturers. The city was a cosmopolitan center; its bourse opened in 1531, "To the merchants of all nations."

The city of Antwerp was a leader in the pepper market, the market of precious metals coming from Mexico and Peru, and the textile industry. The boom-and-bust cycles and inflationary cost-of-living squeezed less-skilled workers. In the century after 1541, the city's economy and population declined dramatically. The Portuguese merchants left in 1549, and there was much less trade in English cloth. Numerous financial bankruptcies began around 1557, until Amsterdam eventually replaced Antwerp as the major trading center for the region.

Aside from commerce, Flanders was historically also an important manufacturing region The beginning of the century the old cloth industries of Flanders had been seriously threatened by English competition; However, Charles V implemented reforms to put the industries of the Netherlands under protection. The cloth industry was strengthened by the introduction of factory methods, and the linen industry was fully developed. Such economic policy was successful. He created new and efficient agencies that fostered the social and industrial life of the people. Agriculture was also promoted together with commercial legislation.

== Art ==
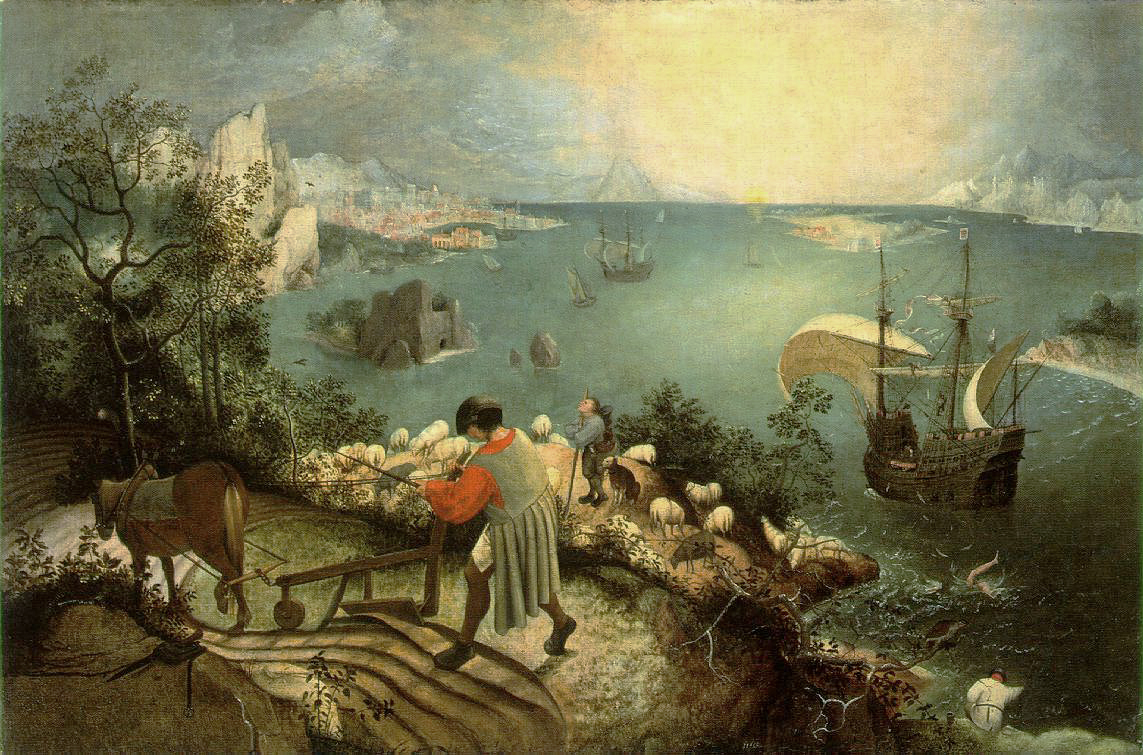
The Fall of Icarus, now considered a copy of Pieter Bruegel the Elder

Flemish artists, who span from the Antwerp Mannerists and Hieronymus Bosch at the start of the 16th century to the late Northern Mannerists such as Hendrik Goltzius and Joachim Wtewael at the end, drew on both the recent innovations of Italian painting and the local traditions of the Early Netherlandish artists. Many artists worked for European courts, including Bosch, whose fantastic painted images left a long legacy. Jan Mabuse, Maarten van Heemskerck and Frans Floris were all instrumental in adopting Italian models and incorporating them into their own artistic language. Pieter Brueghel the Elder, with Bosch the only artist from the period to remain widely familiar, may seem atypical, but in fact his many innovations drew on the fertile artistic scene in Antwerp.

Dutch and Flemish painters were also instrumental in establishing new subjects such as landscape painting and genre painting. Joachim Patinir, for example, played an important role in developing landscape painting, inventing the compositional type of the world landscape, which was perfected by Pieter Bruegel the Elder who, followed by Pieter Aertsen, also helped popularise genre painting. From the mid-century Pieter Aertsen, later followed by his nephew Joachim Beuckelaer, established a type of "monumental still life" featuring large spreads of food with genre figures, and in the background small religious of moral scenes. Like the world landscapes, these represented a typically "Mannerist inversion" of the normal decorum of the hierarchy of genres, giving the "lower" subject matter more space than the "higher". Anthonis Mor was the leading portraitist of the mid-century, in demand in courts all over Europe for his reliable portraits in a style that combined Netherlandish precision with the lessons of Titian and other Italian painters.

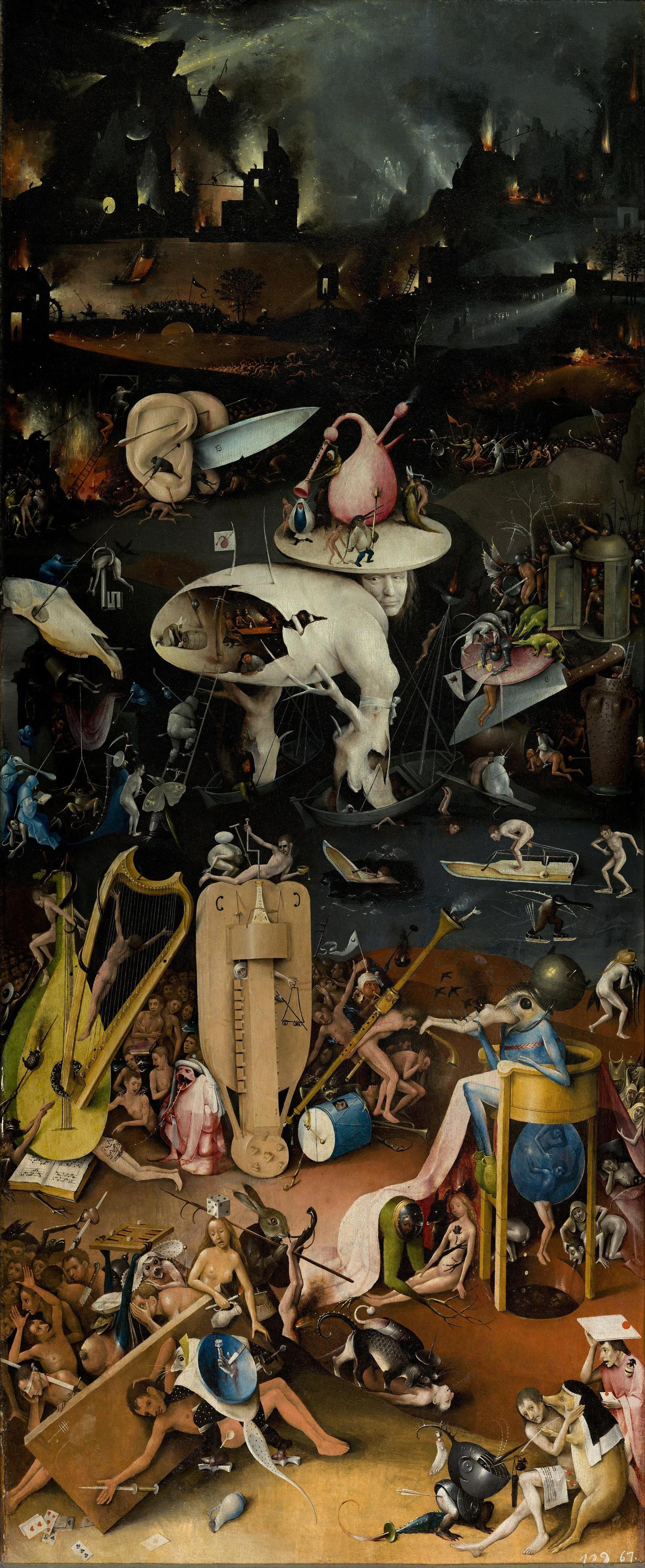
Hell, the right panel from the triptych The Garden of Earthly Delights by Hieronymus Bosch

Italian Renaissance influences begin to show on Early Netherlandish painting around 1500, but in many ways the older style was remarkably persistent. Antwerp Mannerism is a term for painters showing some Italian influence, but mainly continuing the style and subjects of the older masters. Hieronymus Bosch is a highly individual artist, whose work is strange and full of seemingly irrational imagery, making it difficult to interpret. Most of all it seems surprisingly modern, introducing a world of dreams that seems more related to Gothic art than the Italian Renaissance, although some Venetian prints of the same period show a comparable degree of fantasy. The Romanists were the next phase of influence, adopting Italian styles in a far more thorough way.

After 1550 the Flemish and Dutch painters begin to show more interest in nature and beauty "in itself", leading to a style that incorporates Renaissance elements, but remains far from the elegant lightness of Italian Renaissance art, and directly leads to the themes of the great Flemish and Dutch Baroque painters: landscapes, still lifes and genre painting - scenes from everyday life.

This evolution is seen in the works of Joachim Patinir and Pieter Aertsen, but the true genius among these painters was Pieter Brueghel the Elder, well known for his depictions of nature and everyday life, showing a preference for the natural condition of man, choosing to depict the peasant instead of the prince.

The Fall of Icarus (now in fact considered a copy of a Brueghel work), although highly atypical in many ways, combines several elements of Northern Renaissance painting. It hints at the renewed interest for antiquity (the Icarus legend), but the hero Icarus is hidden away in the background. The main actors in the painting are nature itself and, most prominently, the peasant, who does not even look up from his plough when Icarus falls. Brueghel shows man as an anti-hero, comical and sometimes grotesque.

== See also ==
- Renaissance in the Low Countries
