= List of libraries in Belgium =

This is a list of libraries in Belgium.

== National and public libraries ==
- Bibliothèque des Affaires Etrangères, which includes the Bibliothèque Africaine (est. 1885)
- Erfgoedbibliotheek Hendrik Conscience, Antwerp
- Library of the Chanchelor of the Prime Ministers' Cabinet
- Library of the Federal Service of Justice; Brussels
- Library of the National Archives
- Library of the Royal Botanic Society, Meise
- Openbare Bibliotheek Brugge, the public library of Bruges
- Permeke Library, Antwerp
- Royal Library of Belgium (KBR), Brussels

== Museum libraries ==
- Library of the AMSAB, Social History, Ghent
- Library of the Antwerp Zoo
- CIVA
- Library of the Design Museum Ghent
- Library of the Institute Dr. Ghuislain, Ghent
- Library of the Jewish Museum, Brussels
- Library of the MIAT, Ghent
- Library of the MIM, Brussels
- Library of the MOMU, Antwerp
- Library of the MUHKA, Antwerp
- Library of the Museum Mayer van den Bergh
- Library of the Passchendaele Memorial
- Library of the Plantin-Moretus Museum
- Library of the Royal Army Museum, Brussels
- Library of the Royal Institute of Natural sciences
- Library of the Royal Museum of Central Africa, Tervuren
- Library of the Royal Museums of Art and History
- Library of the Royal Museums of Fine Arts of Belgium
- Library of the SMAK, Ghent

== Libraries of abbeys and religious institutions ==
- Library of Affligem Abbey
- Library of the Augustinians, Ghent
- Library of Averbode Abbey
- Library of Bornem Abbey
- Library of the Carmelite Monastery, Ghent
- Library of Chevetogne Abbey
- Library of Dendermonde Abbey
- Library of Grimbergen Abbey
- Library of Keizersberg Abbey
- Library of the Maior Seminary, Bruges
- Library of the Maior Seminary, Ghent
- Library of Maredsous Abbey
- Library of Park Abbey
- Library of Tongerlo Abbey

== Private libraries ==
- Bibliotheca Wittockiana
- Library of the Bar Association; Palais de Justice, Antwerp
- Library of the Bar Association; Palais de Justice, Brussels
- Library of the Bar Association; Palais de Justice, Ghent
- Library of the Magistrate; Palais de Justice, Brussels
- Private Library of the King, Laeken

== University libraries ==
- Academic libraries in Leuven (Universiteitsbibliotheek Leuven)
- Academic Library of Defence
- Ghent University Library (Universiteitsbibliotheek Gent)
- Boekentoren - Ghent University
- Library of the Lemmens Institute
- Library of the Royal Conservatory, Brussels
- Library of the Royal Conservatory, Ghent
- Library of the Royal Military academy
- Library of Saint-Luc, Ghent
- Maurits Sabbe - Library, Leuven
- University of Antwerp Library (Universiteitsbibliotheek Antwerpen)

== See also ==
- List of libraries in the Netherlands
- Open access in Belgium
