= List of archives in Belgium =

This is list of archives in Belgium.

== Archives in Belgium ==
- Archives de la Ville de Bruxelles (city archives)
- CIVA
- Letterenhuis
- Mundaneum
- Liberal Archive (Belgium)
- Royal Museum for Central Africa archives
- State Archives in Belgium
  - National Archives of Belgium
  - Archives du Palais Royal (Belgium)
  - Belgian National Archives 2 - Joseph Cuvelier repository
  - Archives Africaines of the SPF Affaires étrangères, Commerce extérieur et Coopération au Développement
  - Center for Historical Research and Documentation on War and Contemporary Society

== See also ==
- Association des archivistes francophones de Belgique
- List of libraries in Belgium
- List of museums in Belgium
- Culture of Belgium
- List of archives
