= Joseph Lefèvre =

Joseph Marie Henri Lefèvre (1893–1977), who sometimes wrote under the pen name Fabri, was a Belgian archivist and historian.

== Life ==
Lefèvre was born in Leuven on 5 April 1893 and was educated at the Institut Saint-Louis in Brussels and the Catholic University of Leuven. He graduated Doctor of Philosophy from the Faculty of Arts in Leuven on 14 July 1914, with a thesis on 18th-century commercial relations between Belgium and Spain that was published by the Académie royale de Belgique in 1921.

On 1 July 1919 he was provisionally appointed as "archivist second class" in the National Archives of Belgium, an appointment that was made permanent on 1 January 1920. On 11 July 1931 he was appointed assistant conservator, and conservator on 15 December 1938. He retired in 1958, and died in Ixelles on 29 March 1977.

== Publications ==
Throughout his career as an archivist, Lefèvre worked to catalogue the various collections or fonds held in the National Archives, particularly those from the early modern period of the Spanish Netherlands and the Austrian Netherlands. Many of his inventories of these fonds were produced in collaboration with his brother, Placide Lefèvre, who had a particular interest in ecclesiastical history. Joseph Lefèvre was also a prolific contributor to the Biographie Nationale de Belgique. A collection of his articles was published in 1989.

- with Joseph Cuvelier, Correspondance de la Cour d'Espagne sur les affaires des Pays-Bas au XVIIe siècle, continuing the work of Henri Lonchay (Brussels, 1923-1937)
- Inventaire des archives de la Jointe des eaux (1926)
- Le conseil du gouvernement général (Brussels, 1928)
- with Placide Lefèvre, Inventaire des archives des Conseils et Siéges d'Amirauté (Tongeren, 1932)
- with Placide Lefèvre, Inventaire des archives du Conseil royal de Philippe V, 1702-1711 (Tongeren, 1932)
- with Placide Lefèvre, Inventaire des archives du Conseil d'État de Maximilien-Emmanuel à Namur, 1711-1714 (Tongeren, 1932)
- with Placide Lefèvre, Inventaire des archives de l'Ambassade d'Espagne à La Haye (Tongeren, 1932)
- La secrétairerie d'état et de guerre sous le régime espagnol, 1594-1711 (Brussels, 1934)
- with Placide Lefèvre, Inventaire des archives du Conseil des finances (Gembloux, 1938)
- with Placide Lefèvre, Documents relatifs à l'admission aux Pays-Bas des nonces et internonces des XVIIe et XVIIIe siècles (Brussels, 1939)
- Documents concernant le recrutement de la haute magistrature dans les Pays-Bas autrichiens au dix-huitième siècle (Brussels, 1939)
- Correspondance de Philippe II sur les affaires des Pays-Bas (continuing the work of Louis Prosper Gachard) (Brussels, 1940-1960)
- Les instructions du marquis del Carpio ambassadeur espagnol accrédité auprès du Saint-Siège, 1675 (Brussels, 1941)
- Documents sur le personnel supérieur des conseils collatéraux du gouvernement des Pays-Bas pendant le dix-huitième siècle (Brussels, 1941)
- Documents relatifs à la juridiction des nonces et internonces des Pays-Bas pendant le régime espagnol, 1596-1706 (Brussels, 1942)
- L'Angleterre et la Belgique à travers les cinq derniers siècles (Brussels, 1946)
- Spinola et la Belgique, 1601-1627 (Brussels, 1947)
- Documents relatifs à la juridiction des nonces et internonces des Pays-Bas pendant le régime autrichien, 1706-1794 (Brussels, 1950)
- with Lode Wils and C. Préaux-Stoquart, De werking van de staten van Brabant, omstreeks 1550-1650 : volgens Leuvense archiefbronnen. Le Gouvernement du comté de Hainaut au XVIIIe siècle. Les finances des États de Hainaut au XVIIIe siècle d'après la jointe des administrations et des affaires de subsides. La formation du pays de Luxembourg : à propos d'un livre récent (Leuven, 1953)
- Documents concernant le recrutement de la haute magistrature dans les Pays-Bas, sous le régime espagnol, 1555-1700 (Brussels, 1975)
