= Blandijnberg =

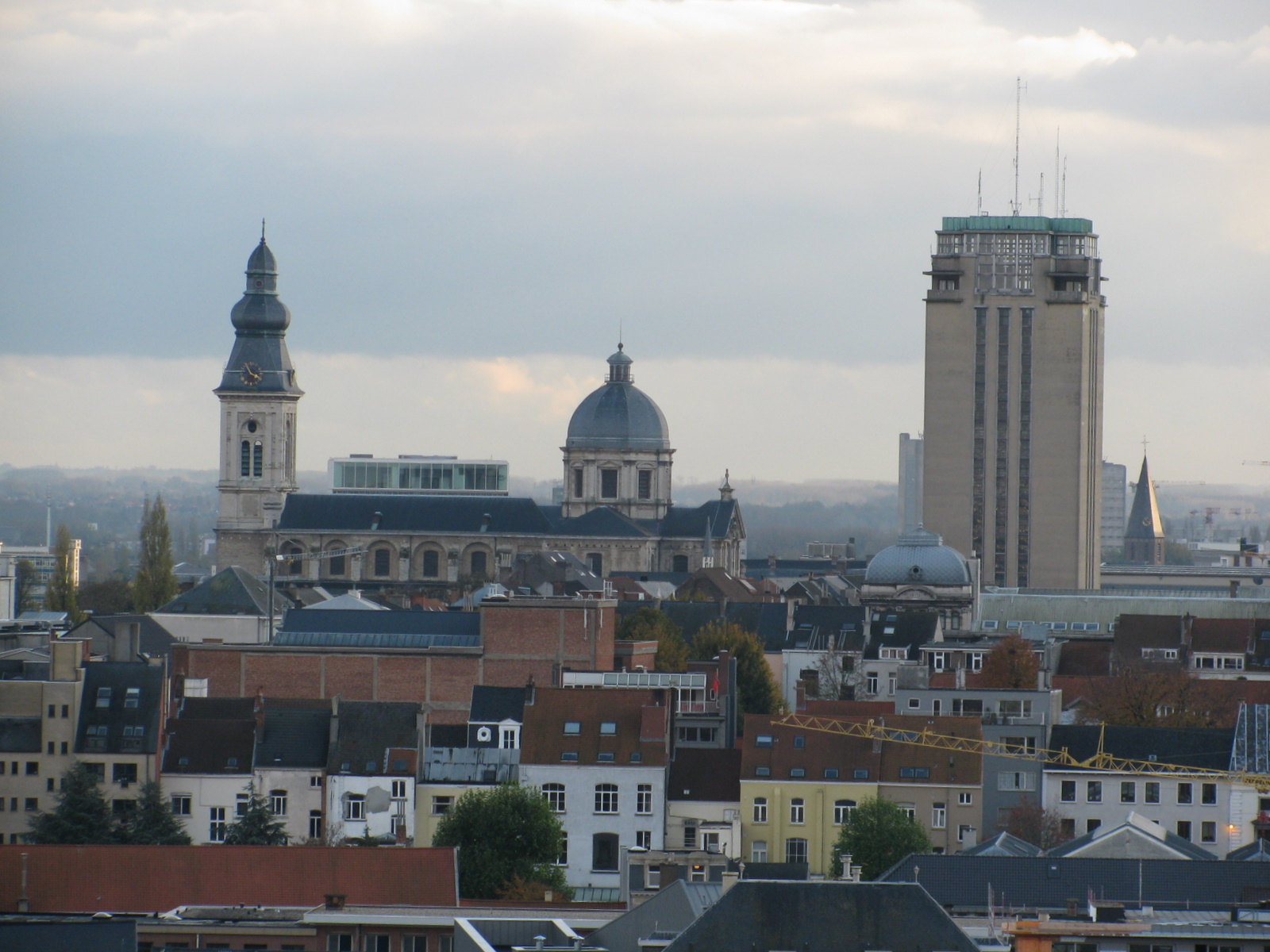
- View of the Blandijnberg with the Saint Peter's Abbey's Church (left) and the Boekentoren (right)

Highest point
- Elevation: 29 m (95 ft)
- Prominence: 20 m (66 ft)
- Coordinates: 51°02′38″N 03°43′31″E

Geography
- Location within Belgium
- Location: Belgium

The Blandijnberg is a 29m high hill in the city center of Ghent in East Flanders, Belgium.

== History ==
The Blandijnberg was already inhabited in prehistoric times. In the 3rd century AD. there was a Gallo-Roman villa on the hill, owned by a person named Blandinus.

In the 7th century, Saint Amand founded the Benedictine Saint Peter's Abbey on top of the Blandijnberg. The area around the abbey was known as Sint-Pietersdorp (Saint Peter's Village). With the expansion of Ghent in the 13th century, the abbey was included in the walled city.

At the end of the Ancien Régime, the church possessions on the Blandijnberg were confiscated by the city. In the 19th century, the Blandijnberg area was completely urbanized and had become a laborers' neighborhood. In 1848, Sint-Pietersplein, the city's largest square, was laid out in order to redevelop the area. At the end of the 19th century, part of the hill was cleared to build new university buildings for Ghent University. In the 1930s, the Ghent University Library with its iconic Boekentoren, designed by Henry Van de Velde, was built on top of the Blandijnberg. In 1960, the new buildings of the Faculty of Arts and Philosophy, known as the Blandijn, were opened. The Blandijn is directly adjacent to the Boekentoren.

== Cycling ==
In recent years, the Flanders Classics cycle race Omloop Het Nieuwsblad has both started and finished on the Blandijnberg hill.

== See also ==
- Blandijn
