= Belgian Office for Intellectual Property =

The Belgian Office for Intellectual Property (in French: Office de la Propriété intellectuelle or OPRI; in Dutch: Belgische Dienst voor de Intellectuele Eigendom, or DIE) is a Belgian government office to manage patent filing and rights. OPRI is based in Brussels, and is part of the Federal Public Service Economy.

OPRI coordinates with the European Patent Office and helps offer the Benelux Patent Platform. Inventors choose whether to have their patent cover Belgium or internationally. As of April 1, 2018, however, OPRI no longer receives patent applications under the global Patent Cooperation Treaty.

== History and archives ==
Historic Belgian patent information was published in semi-annual volumes of the Recueil des Brevets d'Invention. Many of the original patent documents are in the Belgian National Archives 2 - Joseph Cuvelier Repository.
