= Sint-Pietersplein, Ghent =

Square in Ghent, Belgium

Coordinates: 51°2′33″N 3°43′33″E

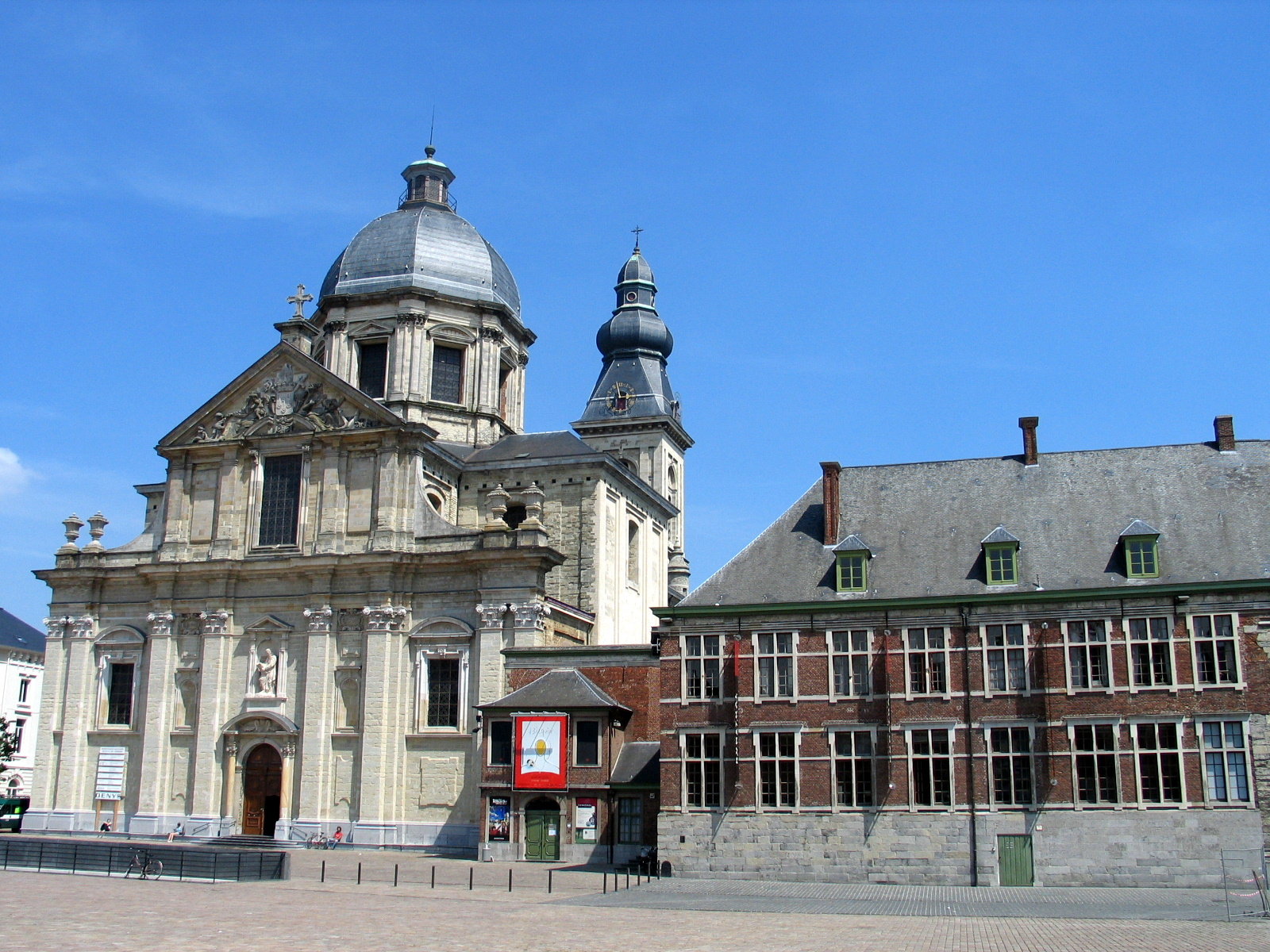
The Sint-Pietersplein with Our Lady of St. Peter's Church and St. Peter's Abbey

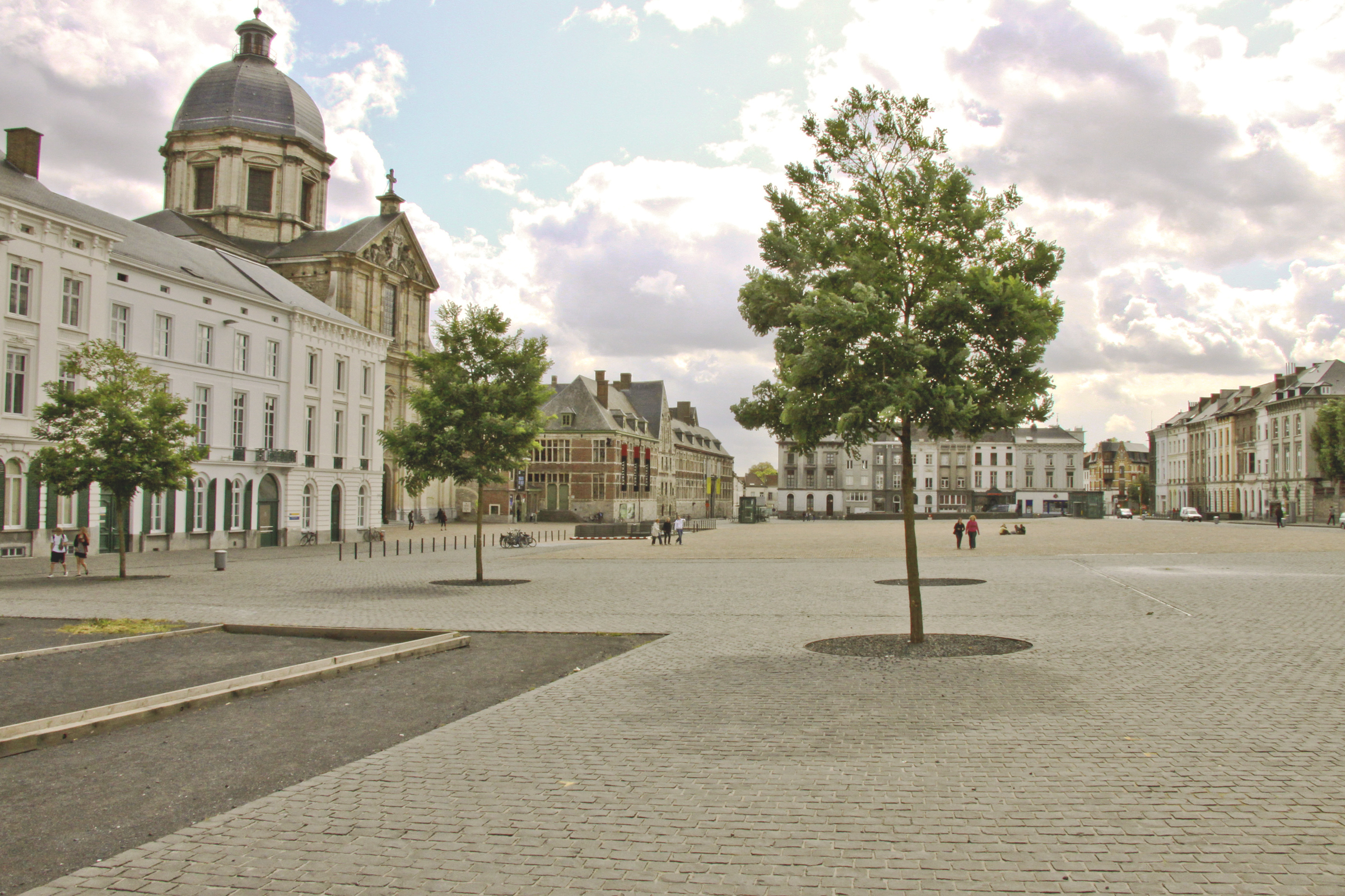
View of the Sint-Pieterplein from the north side

The Sint-Pietersplein (Dutch pronunciation: [sɪnt ˈpiːtərsplɛin]; "St. Peter's Square") is a city square located in the south of the historic centre of Ghent, East Flanders, Belgium. The square is named after St. Peter's Abbey, which is located along its east side. It is Ghent's largest public square and a regular venue for cultural and sporting events, such as the annual Mid-Lent Fair in March. The square and its surrounding buildings are a protected cityscape.

== Location ==
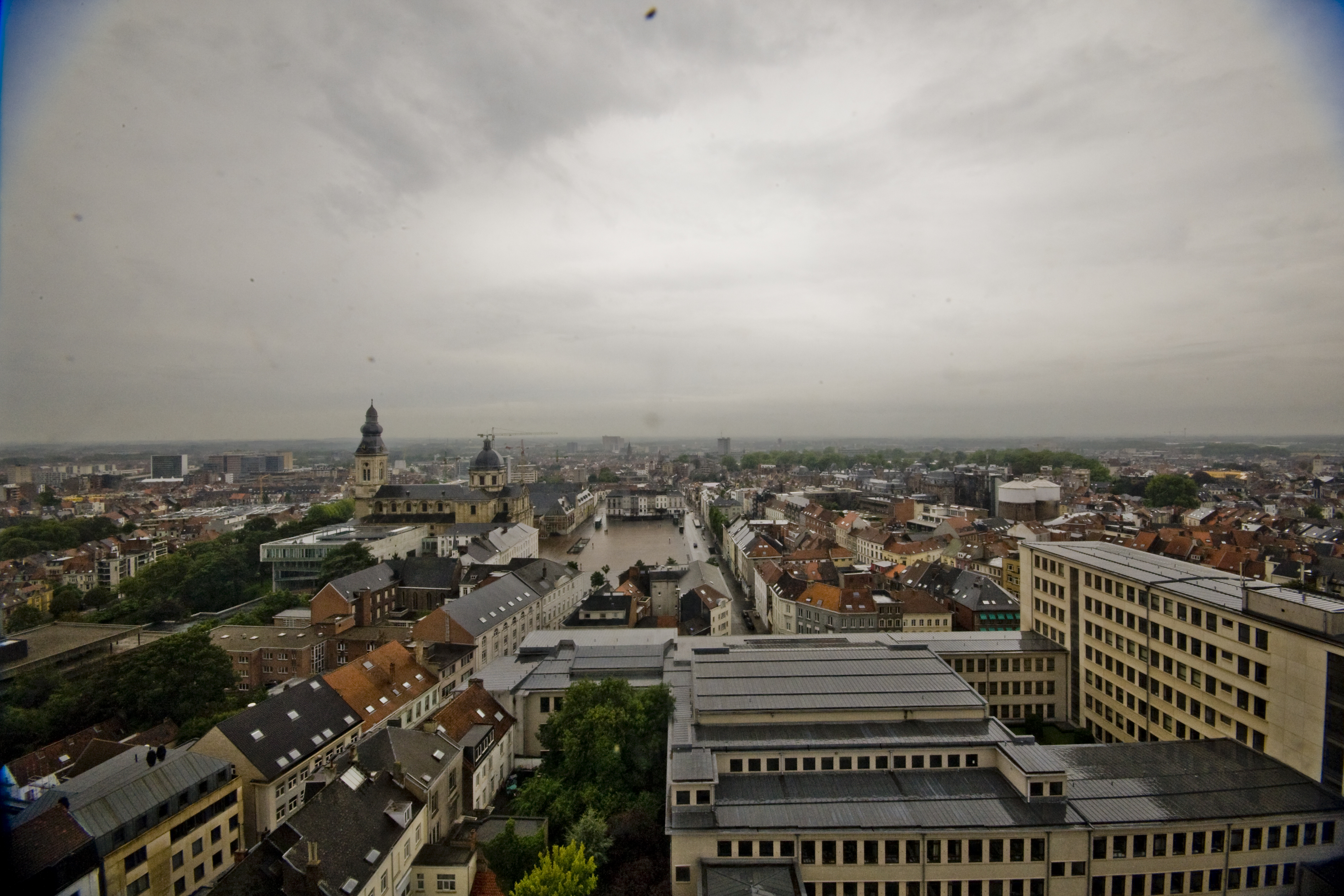
The square (middle), pictured from the Blandijn faculty

Located on the south side of the Blandijnberg, Ghent's highest point, the Sint-Pietersplein is at the heart of Ghent's student neighbourhood. It is directly adjacent to the Arts & Philosophy Faculty of Ghent University in the north; and leads to the Overpoort, known for its concentration of student bars, in the south. The long east side harbours the Baroque Our Lady of St. Peter's Church and St. Peter's Abbey, as well as several neoclassical 19th-century houses and the side-entrance to the university's Faculty of Economics and Business. Opposite the church and abbey is a monumental staircase leading to the adjacent Sint-Amandplein, sided by bistros and restaurants.

== History ==
The current outlay of the Sint-Pietersplein was designed by the urban architect Leclerc-Restiaux and laid out in 1848–1851. With its rectangular dimensions of 80 by 200 metres, it is Ghent's largest open public square.

Underneath the Sint-Pietersplein, an underground three-level car park was constructed in the early 21st century. Upon completion of the car park in 2006, the previous asphalt surface was replaced with a brown-and-grey dimension stone pavement and 18 oak trees were planted on the north side.

== Events ==
The square stages several cultural and sporting events, such as the annual three-week-long Mid-Lent Fair, the academy year Student Kick-Off, the start and finish of the cycling classic Omloop Het Nieuwsblad, a beach volleyball tournament and open-air music concerts. Because of its location outside of the original ramparts of Ghent, the square is not used for the famed Gentse Feesten music and theatre festival.
