= Henri Lonchay =

Belgian historian

Henri Lonchay (1860–1918) was a Belgian academic historian.

== Life ==
Lonchay was born in Liège on 10 April 1860 to a family involved in the arms trade. He was educated at the Athenée royale de Liège and then at the École Normale in the same city, graduating in July 1881 with a qualification to teach history in the upper forms of secondary school. While a student at the École Normale, he had also taken some of Paul Fredericq's courses on National History at the University of Liège.

He taught at secondary schools in Chimay and Ghent before his appointment to the Athénée royal de Bruxelles in 1883, where he taught both history and geography. While teaching he continued to publish his research on the history of the principality of Liège in the early modern period. His studies De l'attitude des souverains des Pays-Bas à l'égard du Pays Liège au XVIe siècle and La principauté de Liège, la France et les Pays-Bas aux XVIIe et XVIIIe siècles received prizes from the Royal Academy of Science, Letters and Fine Arts of Belgium in 1887 and 1891, as did La rivalité de la France et de l'Espagne aux Pays-Bas (1635-1700) in 1894.

From 1890 he had begun lecturing at the Université libre de Bruxelles, where he was appointed full professor in 1895. In 1906 and again in 1908 he undertook research missions to the Simancas archives to analyse documents relating to Belgian history, particularly during the reign of the Archdukes Albert and Isabella as joint sovereigns of the Habsburg Netherlands. These formed the basis of the five-volume calendar Correspondance de la Cour d'Espagne sur les affaires des Pays-Bas, completed after his death by Joseph Cuvelier and Joseph Lefèvre.

His teaching in Brussels was suspended during the German occupation of Belgium in World War I, and he died in Schaerbeek on 13 December 1918.

== Honours ==
Lonchay became a corresponding member of the Royal Academy of Belgium in 1907, and a full member on 27 May 1913.
