= Archives Africaines (Belgium) =

Archives relating to Africa of Belgian colonial agencies

The Archives Africaines of the Belgian Federal Public Service Foreign Affairs in Brussels contains records related to colonial Congo Free State, Belgian Congo and Ruanda-Urundi, 1885-1962. The archives was transferred in 1960 to the Ministère belge des Affaires étrangères. In 2015 the archives went to the Belgian State Archives, an arrangement expected to continue until 2018. The Archives Africaines includes "the archives of the former Ministry for Colonies (5 km), the archives of the Governor-General of the Congo (4.5 km), and the files on former colonial personnel (1.4 km)."

== Archives ==
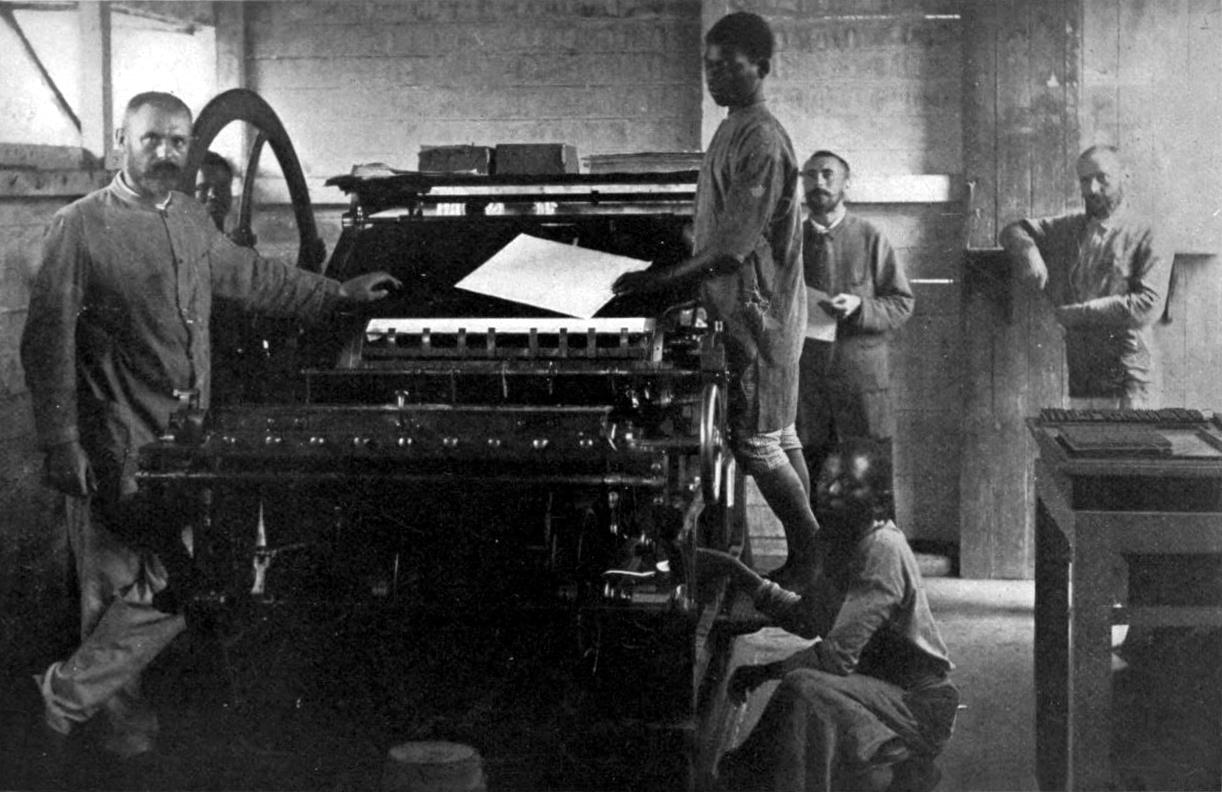
Congo Free State printing office at Boma, circa 1890s-1900s

Records prior to 1906 remain scarce. "As early as 1888 Leopold II created an archival service for his Congo Free State that operated as part of the Departement de l'Interieur at Brussels. The king established the archives as his personal property, however; and in 1906 the major part of the administrative records of the Congo Free State were systematically destroyed."

As of 2015 the extant records are organized by originating office ("fonds").

=== Fonds Ministère des Colonies ===
The following is a list of groups of records within the larger set of records from the Ministère des Colonies.

- 3e DG - Travaux Publics
- Actes officiels
- Affaires Étrangères
- Affaires Indigènes et Main-d'OEuvre
- Agriculture
- Bibliothèque
- Bien-Être Indigène
- Brevets
- Cadastre
- Service cartographique (maps)
- Colonat
- Colonisation et Crédit au colonat
- Cabinets ministériels
- Conseil Colonial
- Conseil Supérieur
- Contrôle financier
- Direction Générale des Services Administratifs
- Distinctions honorifiques
- Douanes
- École coloniale
- Enseignement
- Finances
- Force Publique (militarized police)
- Hygiène
- Institut Royal Colonial Belge
- Impôts des Sociétés
- Inspecteur Général du Service Juridique
- Jardin Colonial
- Justice
- Justice - Successions
- Justice - Kimbanguisme
- Mines
- Missions
- Office des Cités Africaines
- Office Colonial
- Personnalités civiles
- Plan décennal
- Postes, Télégraphes et Téléphones
- Presse
- Rapports Annuels du Congo belge
- Rapports Annuels du Rwanda-Urundi
- Régime foncier
- Service social
- Statuts des sociétés administratives
- Sûreté
- Terres
- Université des Territoires d'Outre-mer
- Privés

=== Fonds Gouvernement Général de Léopoldville ===
These records arrived in Belgium in 1960. The following is a list of groups of records within the larger set of records from the Gouvernement Général de Léopoldville.

- Gouvernement Général de Léopoldville
- Association des Fonctionnaires et des Agents coloniaux (association of colonial officials)
- Affaires Indigènes et Main-d'OEuvre (indigenous affairs and labour)
- Bulletins d'Inscription
- Cabinet du Gouverneur Général (office of the governor general)
- Enseignement et Travail (labour training)
- Gouvernement Général de Léopoldville - Justice
- Missions et Enseignement
- Mobilisation Civile
- Service du Personnel d'Afrique
- Service du Personnel Indigène
- Successions
- Sûreté (security)

=== Fonds Ruanda-Urundi ===
The records in this group arrived in Belgium in 1961.

- Ruanda-Urundi
- Ruanda
- Burundi

== Staff ==
Archivists of the Archives Africaines have included Claudine Dekais (circa 1996). Madeleine van Grieken-Taverniers was archivist of the Ministere des Colonies, circa 1955-1958.

== See also ==
- Minister of the Colonies (Belgium)
- Bibliothèque Africaine, part of the Bibliothèque des Affaires Etrangères, overseen by FPS Foreign Affairs
- Belgian National Archives 2 - Joseph Cuvelier repository, which includes material related to Belgian Congo, etc.
- Belgian Royal Museum for Central Africa, which includes archives

== Bibliography ==
in English

- Carol Dickerman; David Northrup (1982). "Africanist Archival Research in Brussels". History in Africa. 9: 359–365. doi:10.2307/3171618. JSTOR 3171618. S2CID 161432913.
- Hugues Legros; Curtis A. Keim (1996). "Guide to African Archives in Belgium". History in Africa. 23: 401–409. doi:10.2307/3171951. JSTOR 3171951. S2CID 153497192.
- Bérengère Piret (2015). "Reviving the Remains of Colonization: The Belgian Colonial Archives in Brussels". History in Africa. 42: 419–431. doi:10.1017/hia.2015.1. S2CID 159891525.

in other languages

- E. T. Neven (1950). "De Archiefdienst in Belgisch-Kongo". Archives, Bibliothèques et Musées de Belgique (in Dutch). 21 (2). OCLC 2052930. (part 2 in v.22, no.1, 1951)
- Madeleine van Grieken-Taverniers (1955), Inventaire des archives des affaires étrangères de l'Etat indépendant du Congo et Ministère des colonies, 1885-1914 (PDF) (in French and Dutch), Académie Royale des Sciences Coloniales
- Emil van Grieken; Madeleine van Grieken-Taverniers (1958), Les archives inventoriées au Ministère des colonies (PDF), Mémoires de la classe des Sciences Morales et Politiques (in French), vol. 12, Brussels: Académie royale des sciences coloniales, OCLC 2139800 (Includes bibliography)
- Emile J.L.M. Vandewoude (1958), Documents pour servir a la connaissance des populations du Congo Belge (in French), Leopoldville: Section Documentation des Archives du Congo Belge, OCLC 3049243
- Bogumil Jewsiewicki (1980). "Les archives administratives zaïroises de l'époque coloniale". Annales Aequatoria (in French). 1 (1): 169–184. JSTOR 25836252.
- M. Van Grieken-Taverniers (1981), La colonisation belge en Afrique Centrale. Guide des Archives africaines du ministère des Affaires africaines (1885-1962) (in French), Brussels: Ministère des Affaires étrangères
- Christine Deslaurier (2003). "La documentation africaine à Bruxelles. Les fonds du ministère belge des Affaires étrangères (Burundi, Congo, Rwanda)". Afrique & Histoire (in French) (1) – via Cairn.info.
- "Archives coloniales belges: les chercheurs en émoi", Rfi.fr (in French), 5 December 2014, archived from the original on 12 October 2017
