= Belgian National Archives 2 - Joseph Cuvelier Repository =

Site in Brussels, Belgium

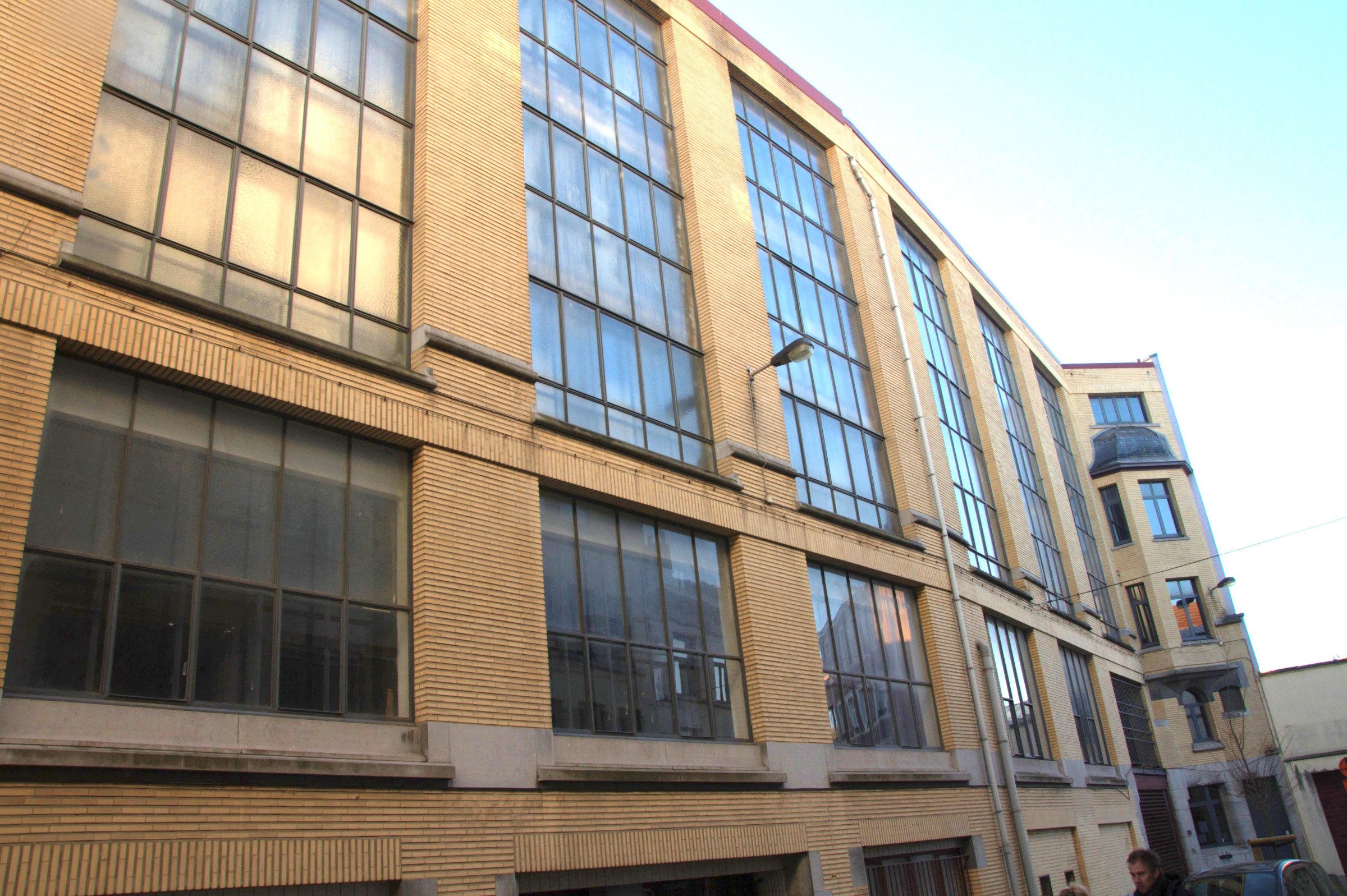
Joseph Cuvelier repository of the Belgian State Archives in the former Haseldonckx paper manufactory, Brussels (photo 2016)

The Dépôt Joseph Cuvelier of the Belgian State Archives opened in 2011. It is located on the Rue du Houblon/Hopstraat in Brussels, in a building designed by Fernand Bodson and built in 1912. Its name honors the historian and government archivist Joseph Cuvelier (1869–1947).

== Holdings ==
The repository contains archival materials related to the economic and political history of Belgium, including:

- Ministerial cabinets
  - Didier Reynders (1999-2011)
  - Olivier Chastel (2008-2011)
- Service public fédéral Économie
  - Commission des brevets, 1914-1932
- Ministère de la Reconstruction^{(fr)}
- Business enterprises, such as:
  - Banque Belge pour l'Étranger
  - Banque d’Outremer
  - Chambre de commerce de Bruxelles
  - Cimenterie CBR
  - Clinique Malibran et Solbosch
  - Compagnie de Pont à Mousson
  - Compagnie financière Belgo-Chinoise
  - Fabrimetal
  - Fédération des Entreprises de Belgique (FEB)
  - Fonderie Nationale des Bronzes
  - ING
  - Société Agefi
  - Société Anversoise Foncière et Industrielle
  - Société belge d’Entreprises en Chine
  - Société Commerciale belgo-allemande du Congo
  - Société Générale de Belgique

=== Congo-related material ===
The repository has material related to the colonial politics and economy of the Congo Free State (1885–1908) and Belgian Congo (1908-1960), such as:

- Dégâts Congo (administration, reconstruction)
- Commission (supérieure) d’indemnisation
- Business enterprises, including:
  - Balser et Compagnie
  - Banque de Bruxelles
  - Banque d’Outremer
  - Banque Léon Lambert
  - Collchimie-Congo (Group Hoechst Belgium)
  - Comité Intérieur Colonial
  - Compagnie des Bronzes
  - Compagnie du Bécéka (Sibeka)
  - Compagnie pour le Commerce et l’Industrie du Congo (Finoutremer)
  - Deutsche Bank
  - Géomines
  - Groep Coppée
  - Siemens-Schuckert
  - Société Agence Financière
  - Société Anonyme de Production, de Transports et d’Echanges (Saptec)
  - Société Anversoise Foncière et Industrielle
  - Société Commerciale Belgo-Allemande du Congo
  - Société de Crédit aux Classes Moyennes et à l’Industrie
  - Société de Traction et Electricité (Tractionel)
  - Société Financière de Transport et d'Entreprises Industrielles (Sofina)
  - Société Générale de Belgique (Generale Maatschappij van België)
  - Société Industrielle et Minière du Congo Oriental
  - Steinhaus W. & Cie
  - Union Minière du Haut Katanga
  - Van de Winckel Hippolyte

== See also ==
- List of archives in Belgium
- Archives Africaines (Belgium)

== Bibliography ==
- Lien Ceûppens; Guy Coppieters (2012), Congo: Archives Coloniales [Congo: Colonial Archives] (PDF), Jalons de recherche (in French), Belgium: National Archives of Belgium, ISBN 9789057465239, archived from the original (PDF) on 2017-10-12 – via Internet Archive, Wayback Machine (Dutch version available free via email request)
