= Camille Tihon =

Belgian archivist and historian

Camille Tihon (1890–1972) was a Belgian archivist and historian.

== Life ==
Tihon was born in Remicourt, Belgium, on 25 June 1890. He studied at the University of Liège under Eugène Hubert and Karl Hanquet, graduating with a doctorate for a thesis on the rule of Robert of Berghes as Prince-Bishop of Liège. From 1912 until his retirement in 1955 he worked at the Belgian State Archives, first at the State Archives in Mons and then on secondment to the State Archives in Liège, before transferring in 1919 to the Central State Archive in Brussels. He served as head archivist of the State Archives (1939–1955), and led the efforts to recover archival material transported elsewhere in the German occupation of Belgium during World War II. After the war he also served as director of the Belgian Historical Institute in Rome (1948–1955).

From 1955 Tihon was an associate member of the Commission royale d'Histoire, and from 1 March 1971 a full member. He died in Schaerbeek on 7 July 1972.

== Publications ==
- "Le rôle des financiers italiens à la Monnaie des Comtes de Hainaut. Un acte de société de 1304", in Hommage à Dom Ursmer Berlière (Brussels, 1931), pp. 197-211.
- "Les Archives de l'État en Belgique pendant la guerre", Archives, Bibliothèques et Musées de Belgique, 17 (1946), pp. 1-11.
- Lettres d'Urbain V, 1366-1370 (Analecta Vaticano-Belgica; Brussels, 1932)
- Lettres de Grégoire XI, 1371-1378 (3 vols., Analecta Vaticano-Belgica; Brussels and Rome, 1958–1964)
- "Aperçus sur l'établissement des lombards dans les Pays-Bas aux XIIIe et XIVe siècles", Revue belge de philologie et d'histoire, 39 (1961), pp. 334-364.
