= Arthur Gaillard =

Head of the State Archives in Belgium
- In office 1904–1912
- Preceded by: Alphonse Goovaerts
- Succeeded by: Joseph Cuvelier

Personal details
- Born: November 23, 1847 Ghent
- Died: May 10, 1912 (aged 64) Schaerbeek
- Education: Doctor of Law and political science
- Alma mater: Leuven University

Arthur Gaillard (1847–1912) was the head of the State Archives in Belgium from 1904 until his death. His career as an archivist began in 1872 and he worked his way up through all the ranks of the service to become its head. He instituted the practice of publishing summary inventories of the collections, many of which he prepared himself. He is best known for fundamental work on the major institutions of the Habsburg Netherlands, in particular the Great Council of Mechelen and the Council of Brabant.

== Publications ==
- Le Conseil de Brabant: Histoire – Organisation – Procédure (3 vols., Brussels, 1898–1902).
- Inventaire des mémoriaux du Grand Conseil de Malines (2 vols., Brussels, 1900–1903).
