= Wittockiana =

Public museum and library in Brussels, Belgium

Wittockiana, Museum of Book Arts and Bookbinding in Brussels
- Wittockiana, Musée des arts du livre et de la reliure à Bruxelles (French); Wittockiana, Museum van de Boekkunst en het Boekbinden te Brussel (Dutch)
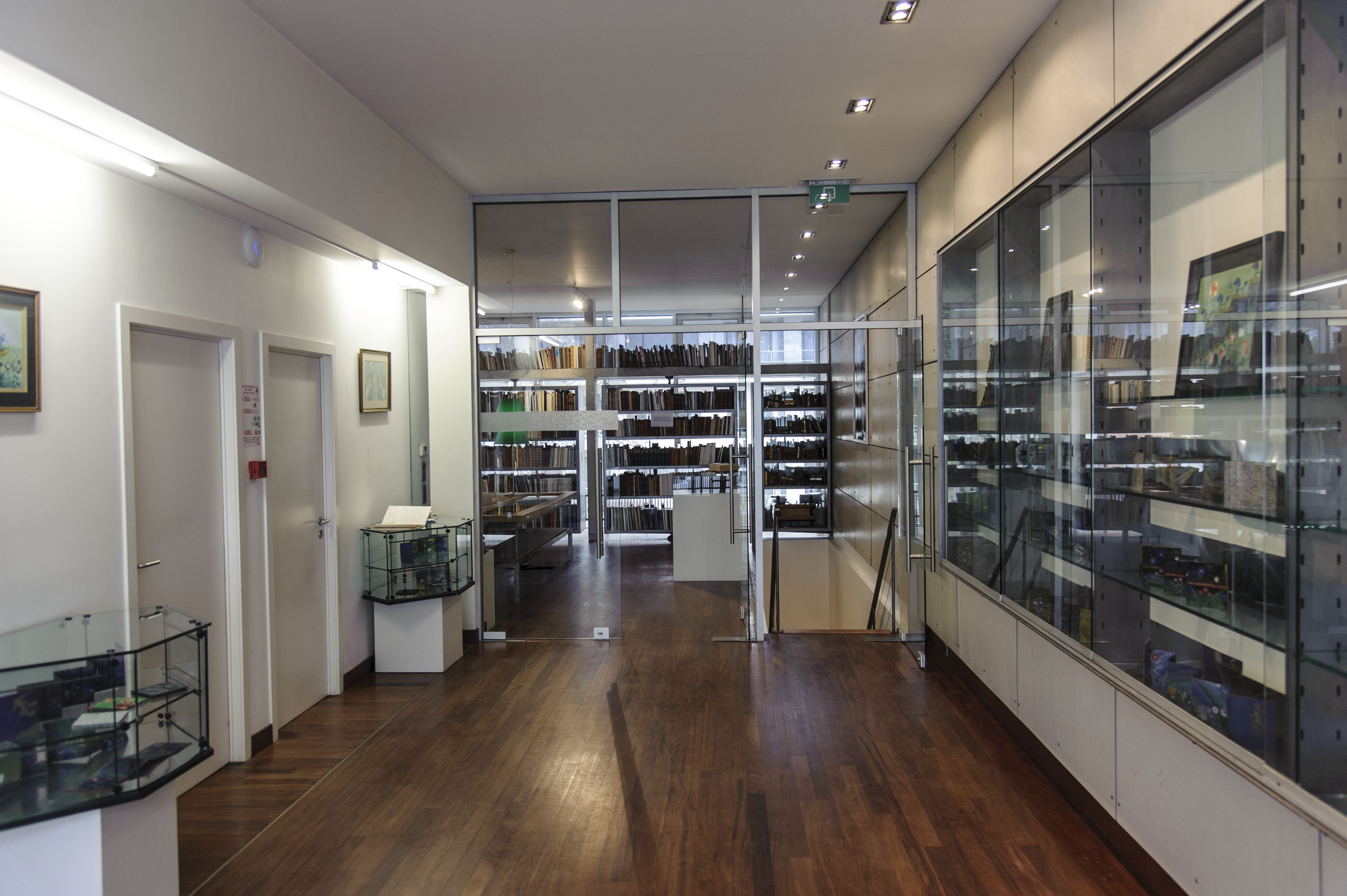
- Interactive fullscreen map
- Former name: Bibliotheca Wittockiana
- Established: 4 December 1981; 44 years ago
- Location: Rue du Bemel / Bemelstraat 23, 1150 Woluwe-Saint-Pierre, Brussels-Capital Region, Belgium
- Coordinates: 50.8321798°N 4.4203395°E
- Type: Public museum
- Founder: Michel Wittock
- Website: wittockiana.org/en

The Wittockiana, Museum of Book Arts and Bookbinding in Brussels (French: Wittockiana, Musée des arts du livre et de la reliure à Bruxelles; Dutch: Wittockiana, Museum van de Boekkunst en het Boekbinden te Brussel), formerly known as Bibliotheca Wittockiana, is a public museum and library in Woluwe-Saint-Pierre, a municipality of Brussels, Belgium, devoted to the arts of the book and of bookbinding.

The museum is based on the personal collection of Michel Wittock, a former entrepreneur and bibliophile, who donated his collection to the King Baudouin Foundation in 2010. The library was opened to the public in 1983. The Wittockiana is supported by the French Community of Belgium.

== Collection ==
The museum reflects Wittock's interests and focuses on books and bookbindings dating back to the Renaissance until present-day. Among others, it holds an almost complete collection of the Almanach de Gotha, a collection of approximately 600 precious rattles (the former collection of Idès Cammaert), the archives of Valere Gille (a writer and influent personality in the literary world of the first half of the 20th century, whose office furniture was designed by Paul Hankar) and a part of the personal archive of Lucien Bonaparte. The museum also hosts temporary exhibitions.

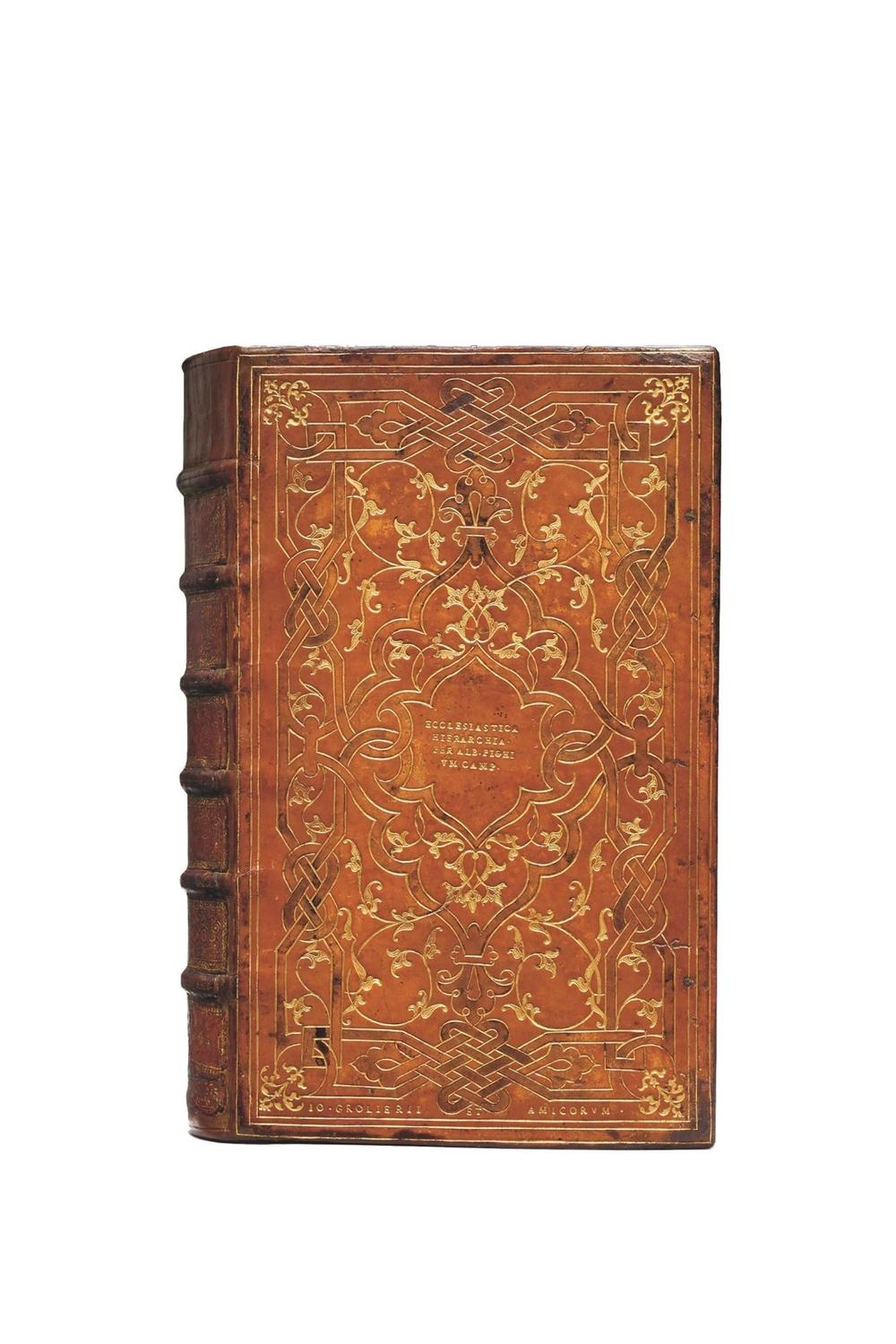
French Renaissance bookbinding with decorative entrelacs (interlacing), made around 1545 by Jean Picard for Jean Grolier. Collection King Baudouin Foundation.

== See also ==
- List of museums in Brussels
- Royal Library of Belgium
- List of libraries in Belgium
- History of Brussels
- Culture of Belgium
