= Joseph Cuvelier =

Belgian historian and archivist (1869–1947)

Joseph Cuvelier (1869–1947) was a Belgian archivist and historian.

== Life ==
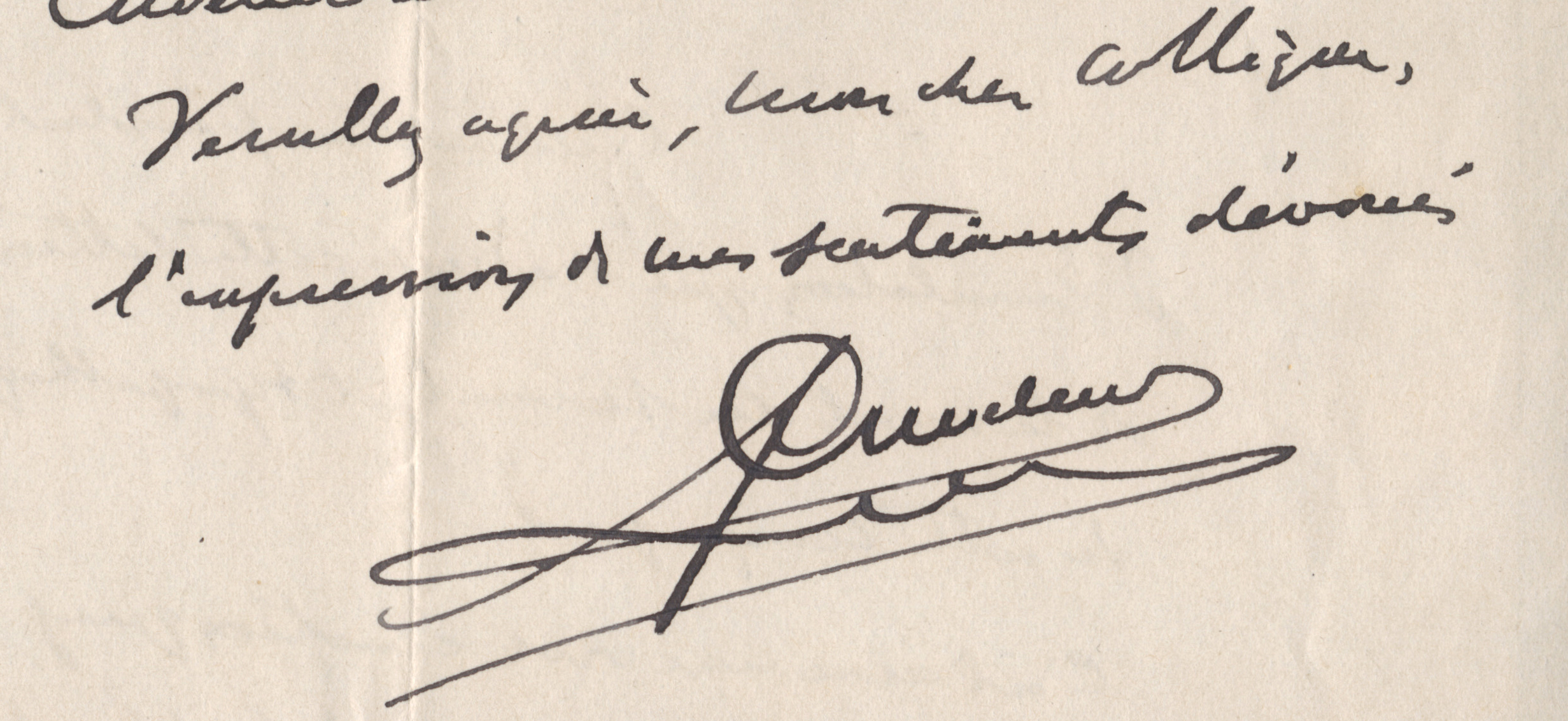
Autograph with signature of Joseph Cuvelier

Cuvelier was born in Bilzen on 6 May 1869 and was educated at state secondary schools there and in Tongeren. He studied history at the University of Liège under Godefroid Kurth, graduating with a doctorate in 1892. At the end of 1894 he was appointed to the State Archives in Liège. On 30 June 1896 he was appointed assistant conservator of the State Archives in Bruges, and in 1900 to the National Archives of Belgium in Brussels, where he would remain for 35 years. At Arthur Gaillard's death in 1912 he became acting head archivist, and was appointed to the function of head archivist in 1913. In the summer of 1913 he undertook a study trip to the principal archives of Germany, Austria and Switzerland. His report of this trip was later translated into English in 1939.

Cuvelier was one of the founders of the Revue des Archives et des Bibliothèques de Belgique and of the Association des Archivistes et des Bibliothécaires. He translated Muller, Feith and Fruin's Manual for the Arrangement and Description of Archives into French. He was a corresponding member of the Royal Academy of Dutch Language and Literature from 1923, and a full member of the Royal Academy of Science, Letters and Fine Arts of Belgium from 1928.

He retired from the state archives on 31 December 1935. In retirement he was active as director of the Belgian Historical Institute in Rome and on the editorial committee of the Biographie nationale de Belgique, to which he had long been a contributor. He died in Woluwe-Saint-Lambert on 29 December 1947.

== Publications ==
- Inventaire des archives de l'abbaye du Val-Benoît à Liège (1901)
- Inventaire des Inventaires de la deuxième section des Archives Générales du Royaume: Chambres des comptes, Chartes de Brabant, Flandres, Namur et Luxembourg, Corps de métiers, Papiers d'État et de l'Audience, Cartulaires et Manuscrits, etc. (1904)
- Les dénombrements de foyers en Brabant, XIVe-XVIe siècle (1912)
- Inventaire des Archives de la Ville de Louvain (4 vols., 1929-1938)

Legacy: A building of the Belgian State Archives was named for Cuvelier.
