= Charles Piot =

Belgian archivist, historian, numismatist and archaeologist

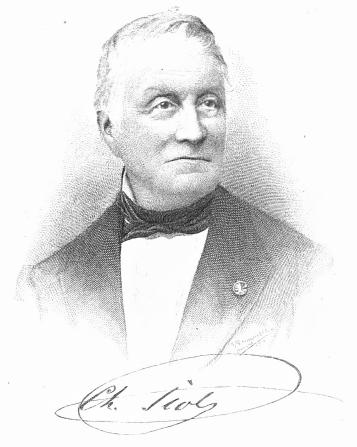

Charles Piot (1812–1899) was a Belgian archivist, historian, numismatist and archaeologist who contributed 73 entries to the Biographie Nationale de Belgique.

== Life ==
Piot was born in Leuven on 17 October 1812, and was educated in the town. He graduated from the State University of Leuven as Doctor of Law on 27 November 1834. As a lover of history, he sought a position in the State Archives, and was appointed archivist second class by ministerial decree on 7 August 1840. His rival for the position, Alphonse Wauters, became archivist to the city of Brussels two years later. On 30 April 1847, Piot was promoted to archivist first class. From 1853 until 1870 he was seconded half a day per week to the Royal Library of Belgium. He became chief of section in 1859, adjunct archivist in 1870, and archivist general of the realm in 1886. He also sat on the Commission des Monuments, the Commission royale d'Histoire and the Commission administrative de la Bibliothèque Royale, and in 1879 had become a member of the Royal Academy of Science, Letters and Fine Arts of Belgium. He retired in 1897. He died in Saint-Gilles, Brussels, on 28 May 1899.

== Works ==
As author

- Histoire de Louvain (1839)
- Sur les relations diplomatiques de Charles Quint avec la Perse & la Turquie (1843)
- Catalogue du dépot des coins, poinçons et matrices de monnaies, médailles, jetons, sceaux, cachets et timbres appartenant a l'état (1861)
- Les pagi de la Belgique et leurs subdivisions pendant le moyen âge (1874)
- Inventaire des chartes des comtes de Namur (1890)

As editor

- Cartulaire de l'abbaye de Saint-Trond (2 vols., 1870 and 1875)
- Chroniques de Brabant et de Flandre (1879)
- Cartulaire de l'abbaye d'Eenaeme (1881)
- Voyages des Souverains des Pays-Bas, vols. 3-4 (1881-1882)
- Correspondance de Granvelle, vols. 4-12 (1884-1896)
- Renon de France, Histoire des troubles des Pays-Bas (3 vols., 1886-1891)
