= Open access in Belgium =

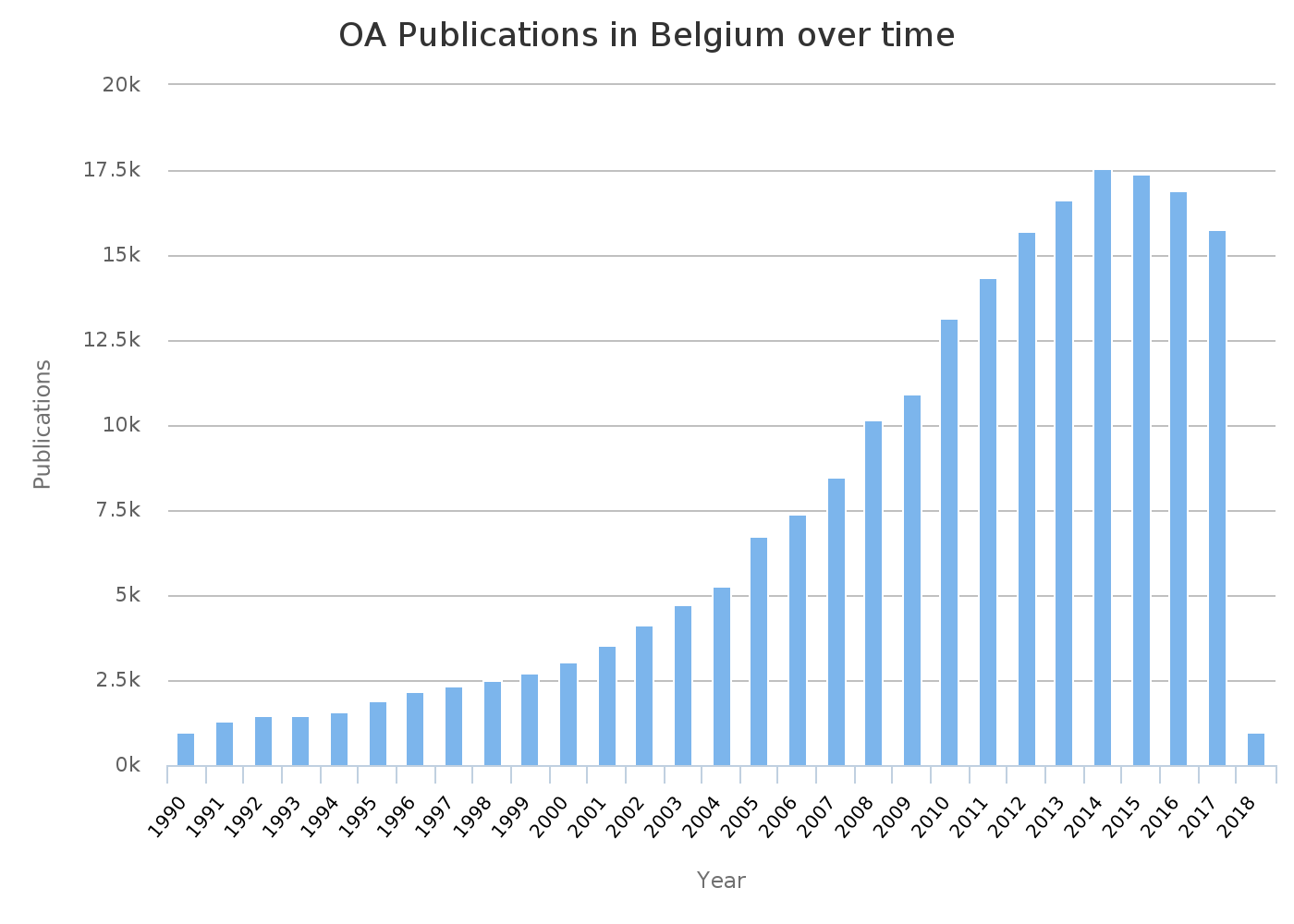
Growth of open access publications in Belgium, 1990-2018

In Belgium, open access to scholarly communication accelerated after 2007 when the University of Liège adopted its first open-access mandate. The "Brussels Declaration" for open access was signed by officials in 2012.

The presence of many Belgium research organizations to the Berlin Declaration on Open access, and the creation of Immediate Deposit and Optional Access mandate at ULG in 2007, led to the Brussels Declaration on Open Access signed in 2012 by the Minister of research. This Declaration enabled Belgium to have a broad network of institutional open-access repositories by circulating the results to Belgian academic and scientific research.

== Repositories ==
There are some twenty-three collections of scholarship in Belgium housed in digital open access repositories. They contain journal articles, book chapters, data, and other research outputs that are free to read. The Université catholique de Louvain, KU Leuven's "Lirias", Ghent University's "Academic Bibliography", and University of Liège's "Orbi" hold many publications.

== BELSPO open research data mandate ==
The BELSPO (Belgian Federal Science Policy Office) mandate was introduced on 21 November 2019. The policy aims at complying with the FAIR data principles in a more sustainable manner, and is applicable to digital data whose collection has been funded either partially or entirely by the BELSPO. The Data management plan (DMP) was to be integrated in March 2020.

== See also ==
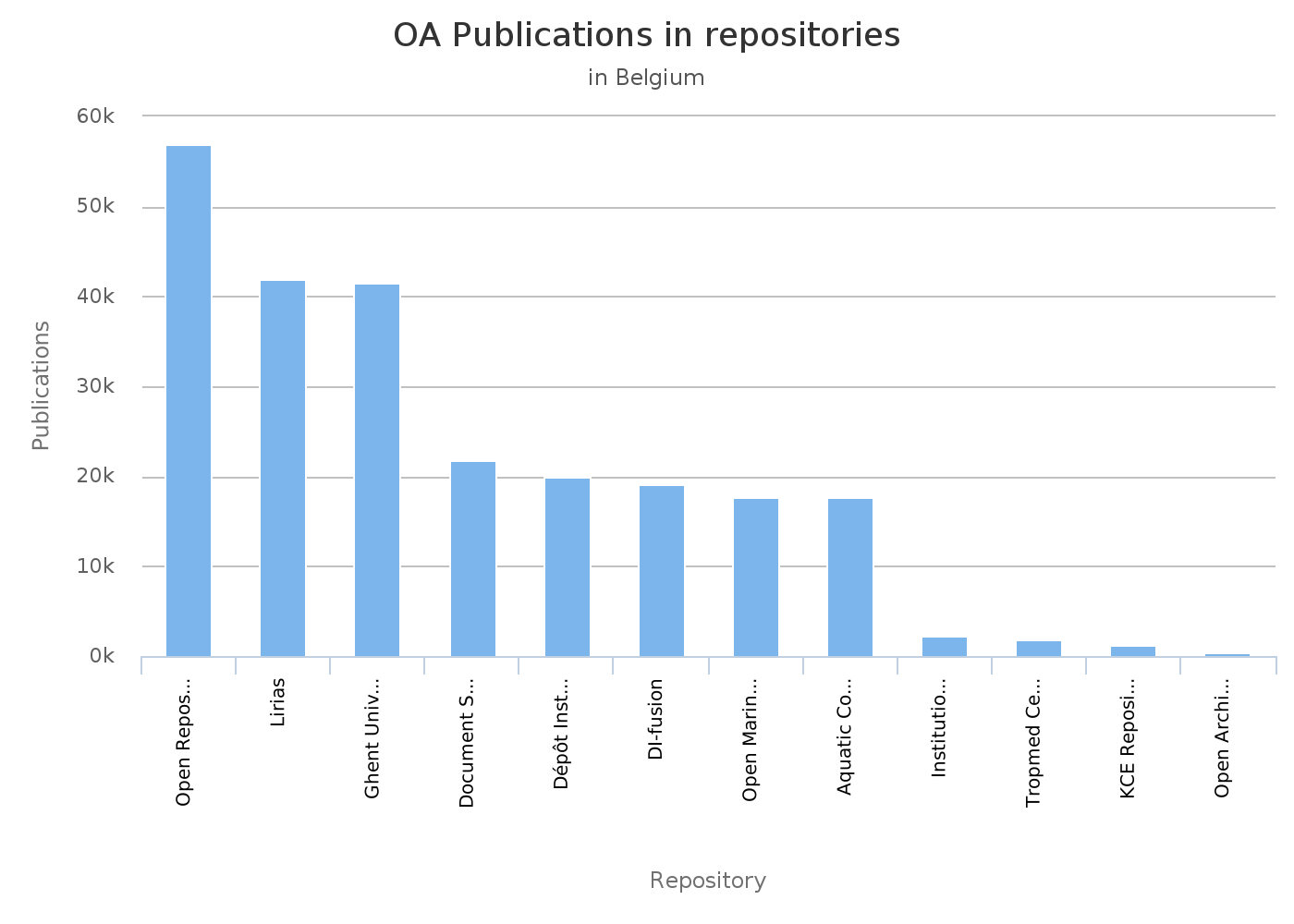
Number of open access publications in various Belgian repositories, 2018

- Internet in Belgium
- Education in Belgium
- Media of Belgium
- List of libraries in Belgium
- Science and technology in Belgium
- Open access in other countries
