= Blandijn =

Coordinates: 51°2′38.66″N 3°43′32.62″E

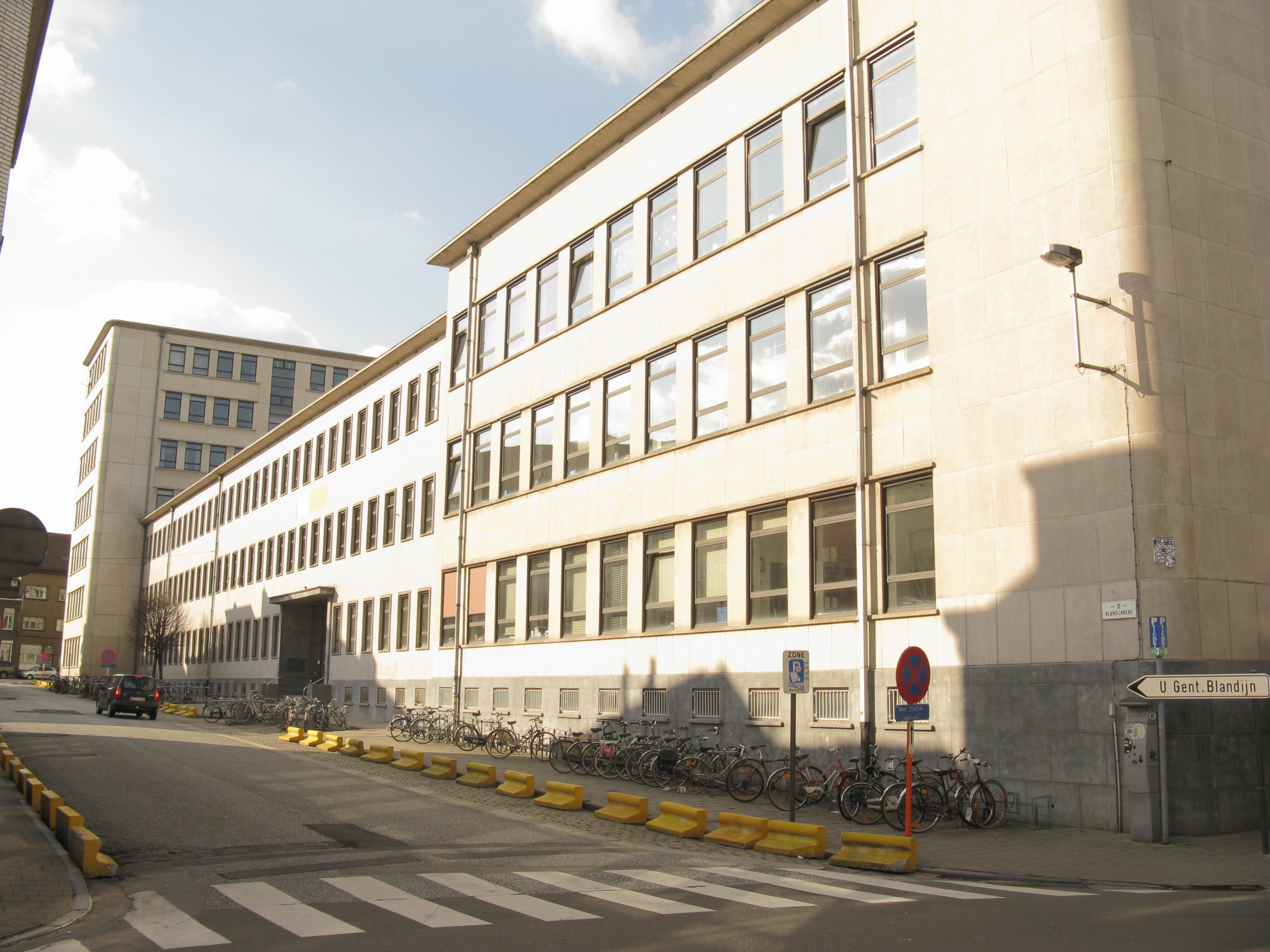
South side and main entrance of the Blandijn

The Blandijn, short for Blandijnberg, is a building complex of Ghent University in the Belgian city Ghent and directly adjacent to Boekentoren, the tower of the Ghent University Library. The Blandijn, named after the Blandijnberg hill it stands on, houses the Faculty of Arts & Philosophy. The first part of the Blandijn buildings was officially opened in 1960. The Blandijn complex is located centrally in Ghent's student neighborhood. There are several other university buildings within walking distance of the Blandijn.

In the 1960s to 1980s, there were several student demonstrations at the site of the Blandijn. The severest demonstrations took place in 1969 in the wake of May 1968. Currently, the university is working on the renovation of libraries both in the Blandijn and in the Boekentoren. All seminary libraries within the Faculty of Arts & Philosophy are being centralized in the Rozier-building, whereas the Boekentoren is facing a make-over. All documents in the tower will temporarily be relocated to an underground library under the court between the Boekentoren and the Blandijn, the construction of which was finished in 2013.

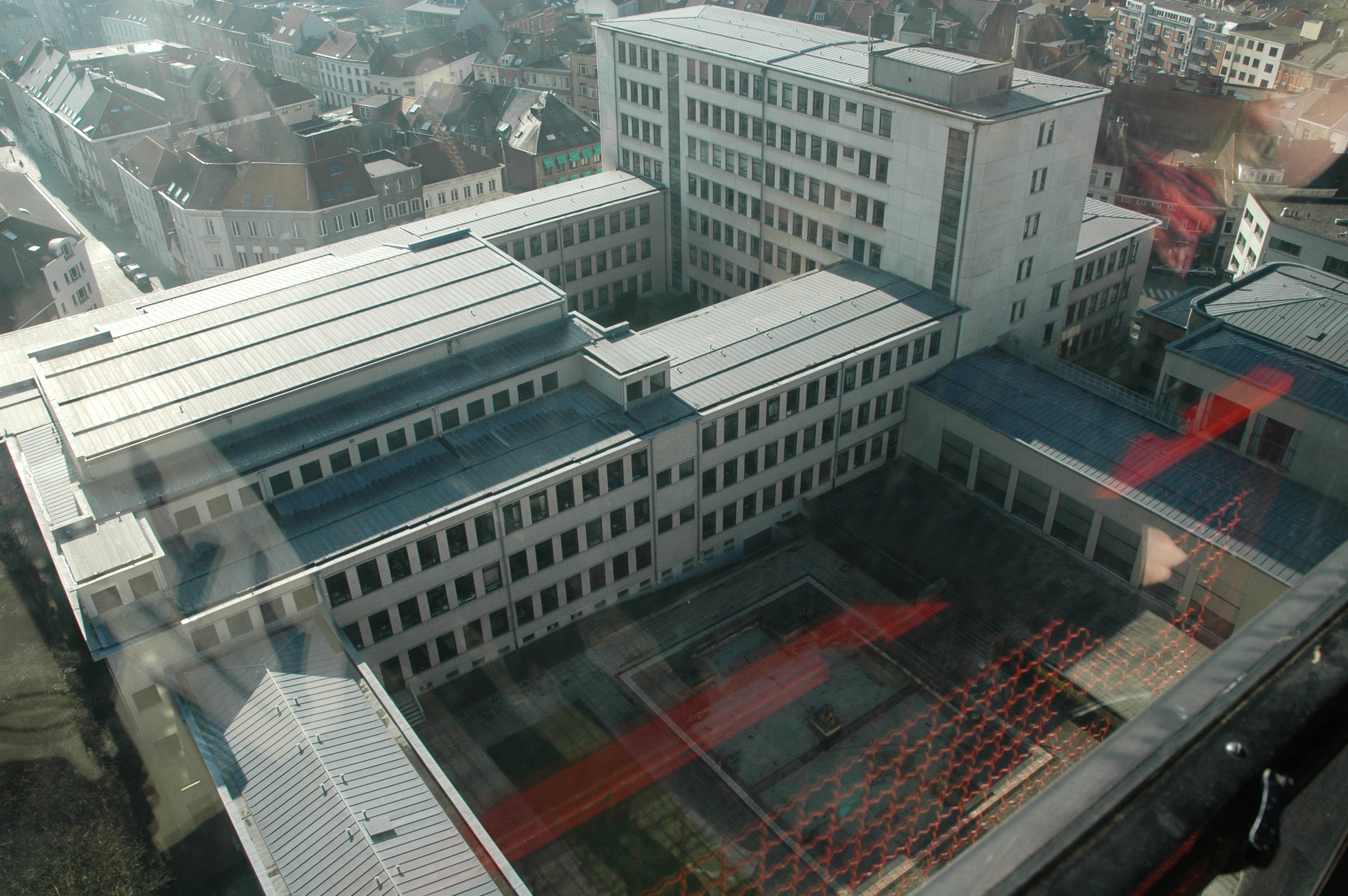
View of the Blandijn complex from the belvedere of the Boekentoren

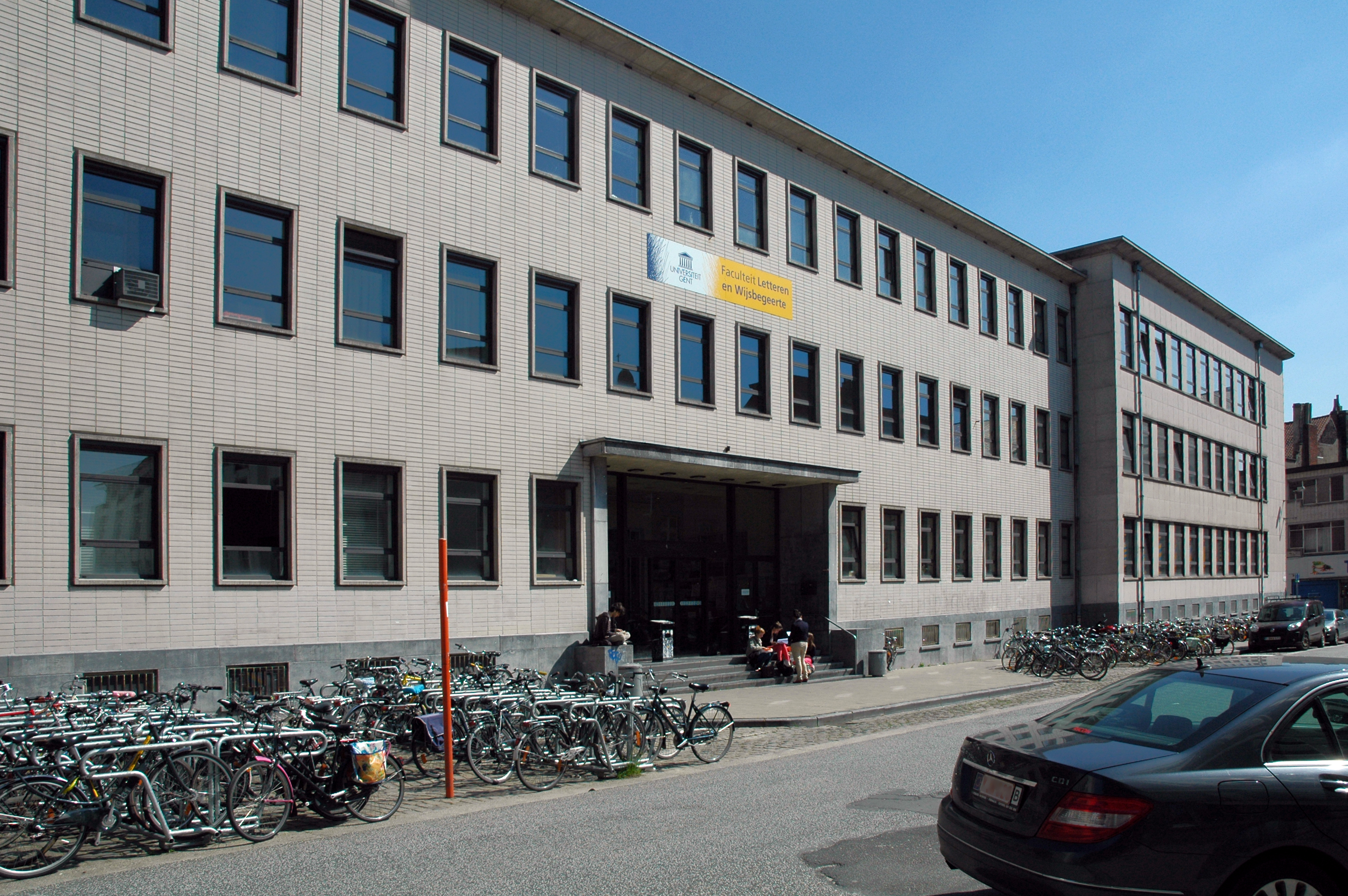
Main entrance on the Blandijnberg street

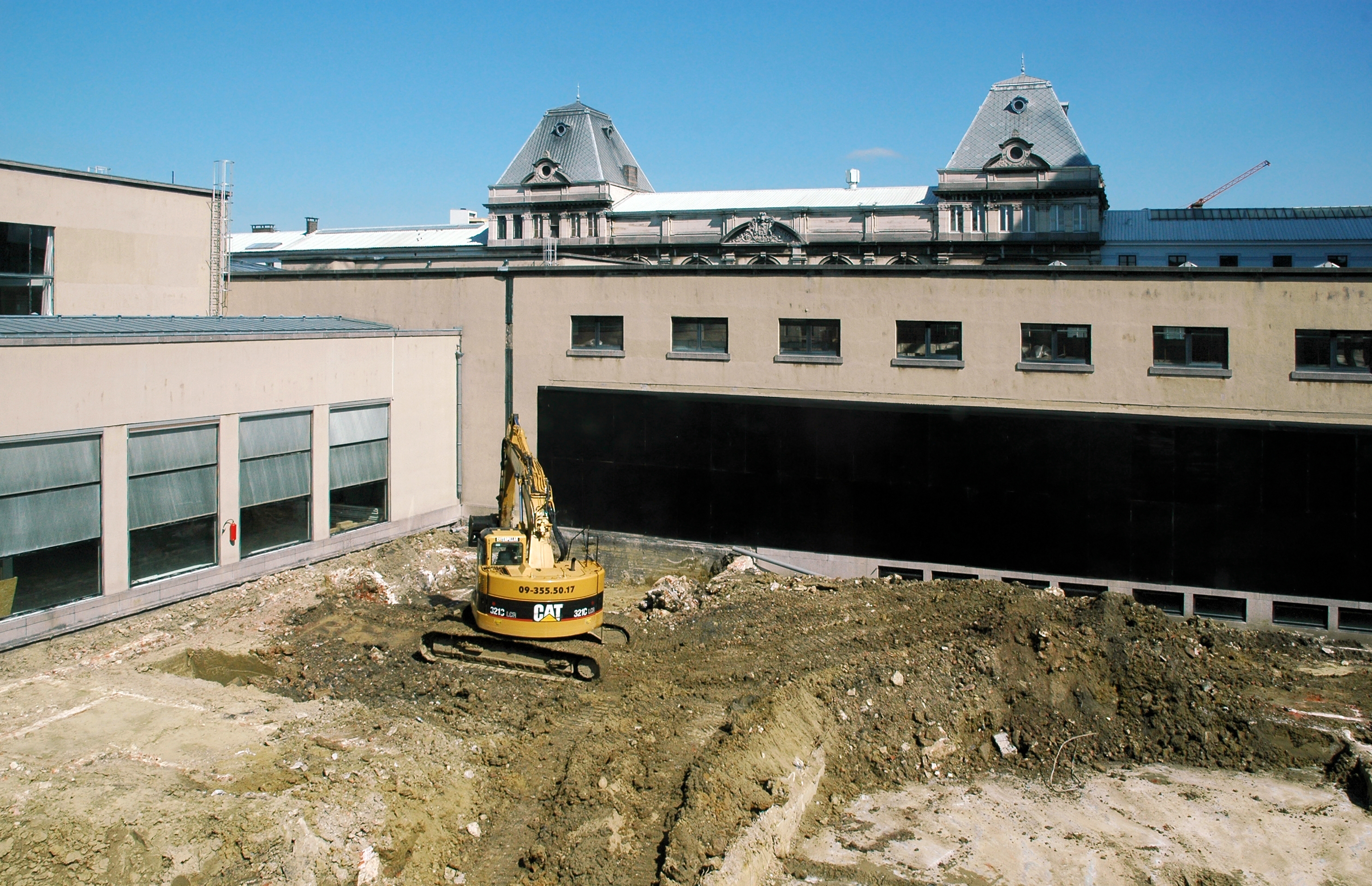
Courtyard between the Blandijn and the Boekentoren is being dug out (May 2012)
