= African Library, Brussels =

African studies research library in Belgium

The African Library (French: Bibliothèque africaine; Dutch: Afrika-bibliotheek) was an African Studies research library in Brussels, Belgium, originally founded in 1885 as the Bibliothèque Coloniale. It was initially established by Leopold II of Belgium as part of his efforts for the colonization of the Congo and the establishment of the Congo Free State. The library was transferred to the Ministry of the Colonies in 1908, when the Congo Free State became the Belgian Congo. In 1962, when Belgium ceased to be a colonial power, responsibility for the library passed to the Foreign Ministry. The library's holdings included material not only on Africa, but also on European colonisation in Asia and Latin America.

The independent existence of the library became difficult to maintain after 1980, and by 1989 there were fears the collection might be dispersed. The holdings, which in 2003 amounted to some 230,000 volumes, became a distinct fonds within the Library of Foreign Affairs of the Federal Public Service Foreign Affairs. Since June 2017, access to the collection has been through the Royal Library of Belgium in Brussels.

== See also ==
- Archives Africaines, in Brussels
- Library of the Royal Museum for Central Africa, in Tervuren
- Library of the Royal Academy for Overseas Sciences
