= Ghent University Library =

Institutional library

Coordinates: 51°02′41″N 3°43′33″E

- Universiteitsbibliotheek Gent
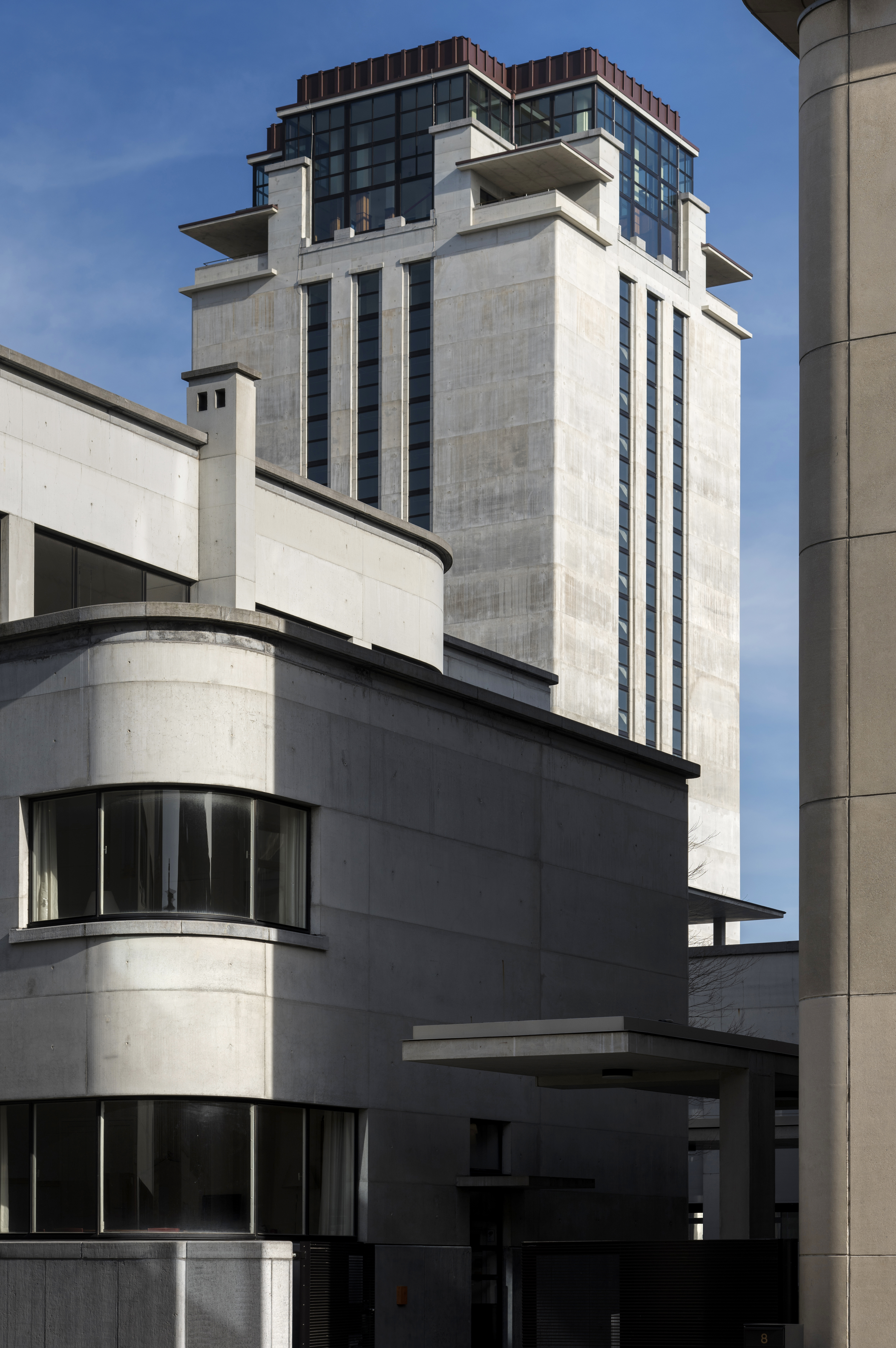
- The Boekentoren
- Location: Ghent, Belgium
- Type: Academic library
- Established: 1818

Other information
- Website: lib.ugent.be

Ghent University Library (Dutch: Universiteitsbibliotheek Gent) is a university library located in the city of Ghent, Belgium. It serves the Ghent University community of students and scholarly researchers.

== History ==
After Ghent University was founded in 1817, books confiscated by the state during the French period were given to the university.

In 1942, the Book Tower (Boekentoren) was opened, located next to the Blandijn, which houses the Faculty of Arts and Philosophy. Designed by Henry van de Velde, it has since been the chief architectural feature of the library.

The library has evolved in recent years, focusing on decentralization and networking rather than a central facility. Some collections of books are to be found in the faculty libraries; but some books are conventionally gathered together in the university library.

== Digitization ==
A range of electronic resources are available within the UGent network as part of a digital library. The Library has also joined with the Google Books Library Project in digitizing books to be made more widely accessible online.

== See also ==
- Open access in Belgium
