= Federal Public Service Economy =

Federal Public Service of Belgium

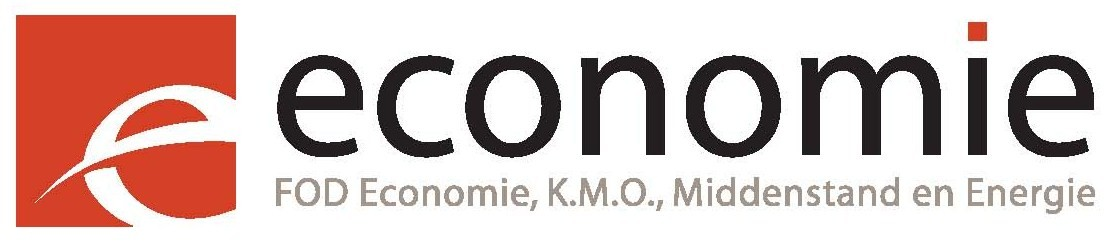
Logo in Dutch language

The FPS Economy, SMEs, Middle Classes, and Energy (Dutch: FOD Economie, KMO, Middenstand en Energie, French: SPF Économie, PME, Classes moyennes et Énergie, German: FÖD Wirtschaft, KMU, Mittelstand und Energie), more commonly known as the FPS Economy, is a Federal Public Service of Belgium. It was created by Royal Order on 25 February 2002, as part of the plans of the Verhofstadt I Government to modernise the federal administration. It is responsible for contributing to the development, competitiveness and sustainability of the goods and services market, ensuring the position of the Belgian economy at the international level, promoting trade by fair economic relations in a competitive market, collecting, processing and disseminating economic information.

== Organisation ==
The FPS Economy is currently organised into seven Directorates-General:

- The Directorate-General for Energy
- The Directorate-General for Economic Regulation
- The Directorate-General for Economic Analysis and International Economy
- The Directorate-General for SMEs Policy
- The Directorate-General for Quality and Security
- The Directorate-General for Economic Inspection
- The Directorate-General for Statistics, also known as Statistics Belgium

== See also ==
- Economy of Belgium
- Belgian Office for Intellectual Property, which is part of the Federal Public Service Economy
