= Annales Aequatoria =

- Discipline: Anthropology, African languages
- Language: English, French
- Edited by: Honoré Vinck

Publication details
- Former name: Aequatoria
- History: 1937–1962; 1980–2009
- Publisher: Centre Aequatoria (Democratic Republic of the Congo)
- Frequency: Annual

Standard abbreviations
- ISO 4: Ann. Aequat.

Indexing
- ISSN: 0304-257X
- OCLC no.: 405811410

Links
- Journal homepage; Online archive; Aequatoria archive

Annales Aequatoria was an annual peer-reviewed academic journal that covered studies on the languages, societies, and history of Central Africa in general and the Congo in particular.

The journal was established in 1937 under the title Aequatoria. It was published in Coqhuilhatville, Belgian Congo, (now Mbandaka, Democratic Republic of the Congo) from 1937 to 1962. After a long pause, it was resuscitated from 1980 to 2009 with 30 new volumes published by the Centre Aequatoria under the title Annales Aequatoria.

In 2009, Annales Aequatoria ceased publication, but the volumes from 1980 to 2009 are available online.

The journal is abstracted and indexed in: International Bibliography of the Social Sciences, Cambridge Scientific Abstracts, and Language and Language Behavior Abstracts.
