= Boekentoren =

Modernist building in Ghent, Belgium

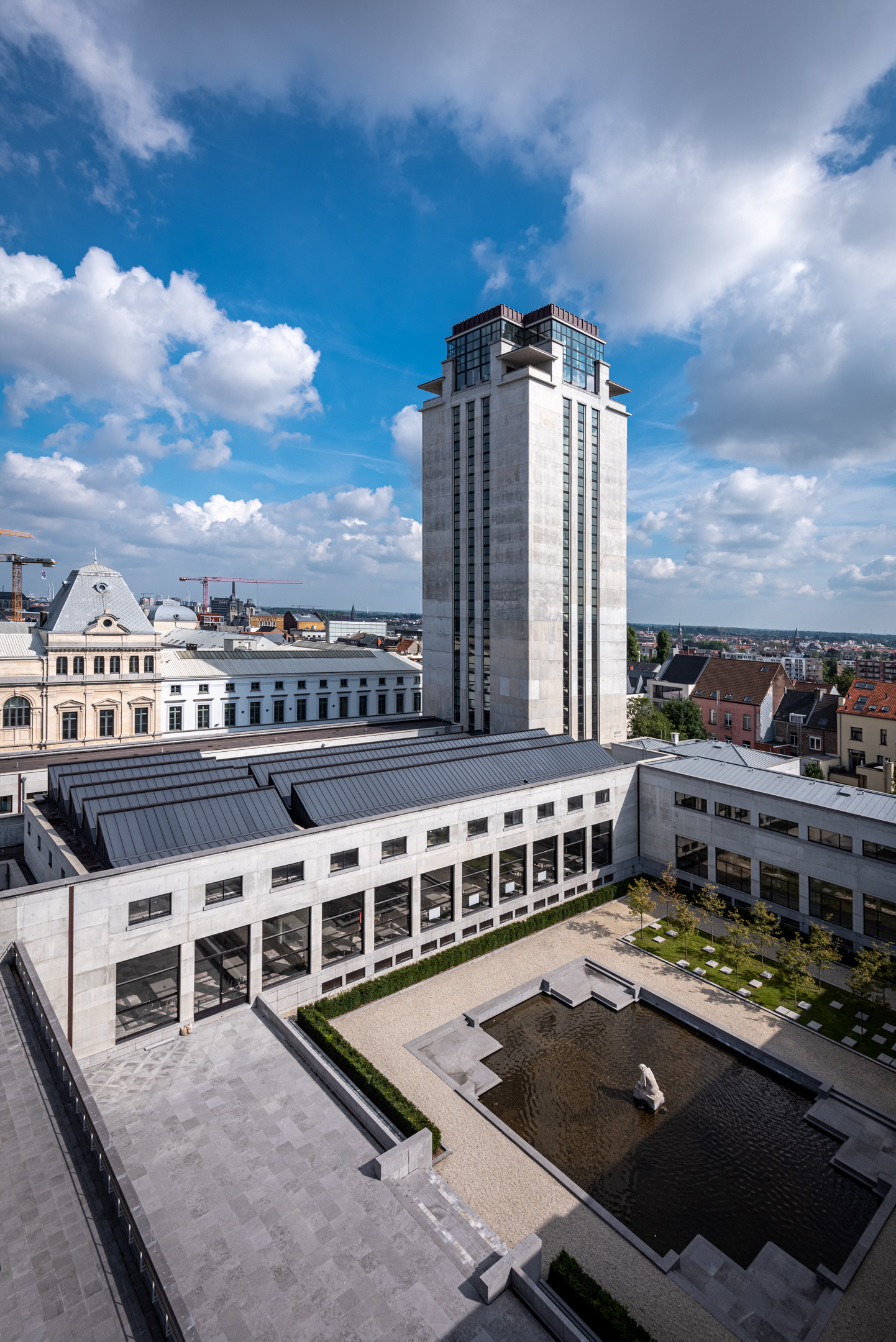
- The Boekentoren in 2021
- Interactive map of the Boekentoren area

General information
- Type: Library
- Architectural style: Modernism
- Location: Ghent, Belgium
- Coordinates: 51°02′41″N 3°43′33″E
- Construction started: 1936
- Completed: 1942

Design and construction
- Architect: Henry Van de Velde

The Boekentoren (Dutch for Book Tower) is a modernist building in Ghent, Belgium, designed by the architect Henry van de Velde. It is part of the Ghent University Library and houses three million books. The Boekentoren is directly adjacent to the Blandijn, the buildings of the Faculty of Arts and Philosophy.

== History ==
In 1933, the Flemish architect Henry van de Velde was commissioned to design a building for the Library and the Institutes of Art History, Veterinarian Studies and Pharmaceutical sciences of the Ghent University (Universiteit Gent) on the premises of the former De Vreese Alley on the Blandijnberg. Situated on the highest ground in the city, the site offered the architect an opportunity to give Ghent its fourth tower—this time not for ringing bells, but for housing books. With its height of 64 metres (210 ft), the Boekentoren reaches out to the sky above Ghent alongside its (late) medieval predecessors to mark the city skyline and to put the university on the map. Together with the three towers, the so-called "Tower of Wisdom" helped Ghent realise the dream it had since hosting the World's Fair in 1913 of creating a "Parade of Towers". These are the three towers of the Middle Ages—Saint Nicholas' Church, the Belfry and Saint Bavo's Cathedral—and the modernist Boekentoren.

Constructed in concrete—an innovative material at the time—using the then equally novel technique of sliding shuttering, the Boekentoren was given the shape of a Greek cross to symbolise the connection between time and space, and the merging of heaven and earth. Twenty storeys above and four below ground level accommodate a line-up of some 46 kilometres of books and other printed material, or over three million items. Supporting the vertical lines of the tower and the books on the shelves are the horizontal lines of the open books on the long tables of the reading room, the rectangular courtyard bathed in daylight, and the reading room for manuscripts, shielded from daylight at the north side of the edifice. The tower was inaugurated in 1942 and recognised as a monument in 1992.

== Restoration ==
Almost 70 years after its completion, a thorough restoration started, including the Belvedère and the interiors. The occasion was also used to make the tower more accessible to the general public. The building was modified to meet the demands of modern library management, especially as far as protection and management of the collection (e.g. air conditioning, replacement of obsolete provisions with modern and more efficient ones) are concerned. The tower was, therefore, not only restored, but also thoroughly updated. A three-storey underground repository was built under the inner garden; it was completed in 2014, so the books could move from the tower to the underground and the concrete skin of the tower could be replaced. This entire operation was overseen by the architects Robbrecht and Daem. Restoration started in 2012. The library services with its study landscape and reading room returned to use in summer 2021. The east wing with office spaces was completed in early 2024 and works on the west wing began in the same year.

The restoration began with the private person Andre Singer, who initiated a campaign to raise awareness of the building's architectural value, and of the need for restoration. The then-rector Andre De Leenheer took on the task of securing university funding and other sources of finance for the full restoration.

== Trivia ==
During World War II, the Boekentoren was taken over by the German Army because of its views of the surrounding area.

In 2007, the Flemish public broadcaster VRT nominated the belvedère of the Boekentoren for their programme Monumentenstrijd. This "Battle between Monuments" was based on the BBC show Restoration, which had many viewers in Belgium.

On 3 April 2013, the Boekentoren was featured in the Google logo to celebrate Henry van de Velde's 150th birthday.

On 12 November 2018, a bronze dog statue was placed on top of the Boekentoren. The animal looks east, towards the rising sun. The full-size, upright sitting dog is clearly visible from St. Peter's Square. The idea was conceived by Michiel Hendryckx to stimulate both curiosity and amazement. The animalier Greta Van Puyenbroeck created the image, for which a smooth-haired fox terrier served as a model.

== Gallery ==
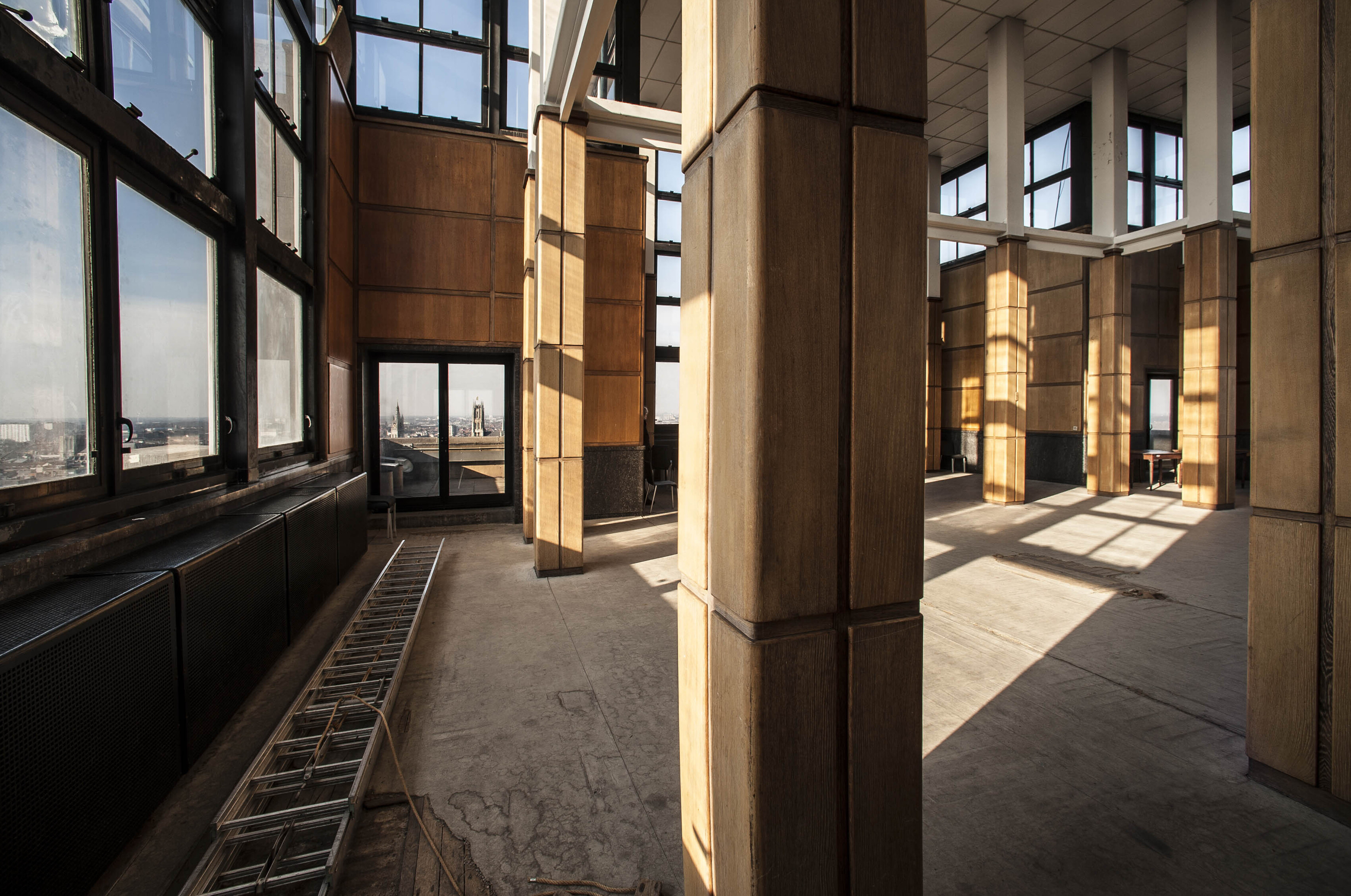
Belvedère (2013)

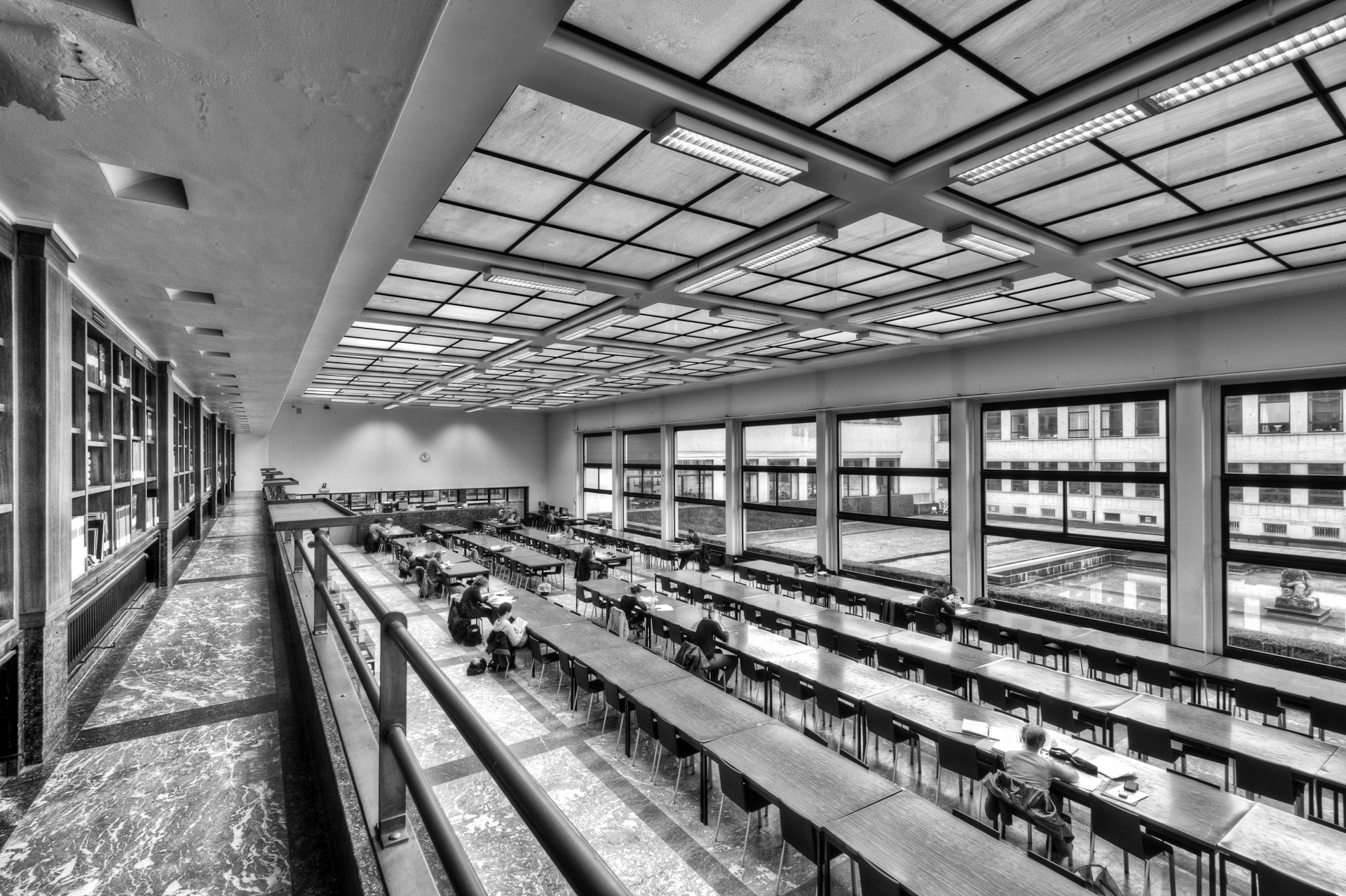
Large reading room seen from mezzanine (2012)

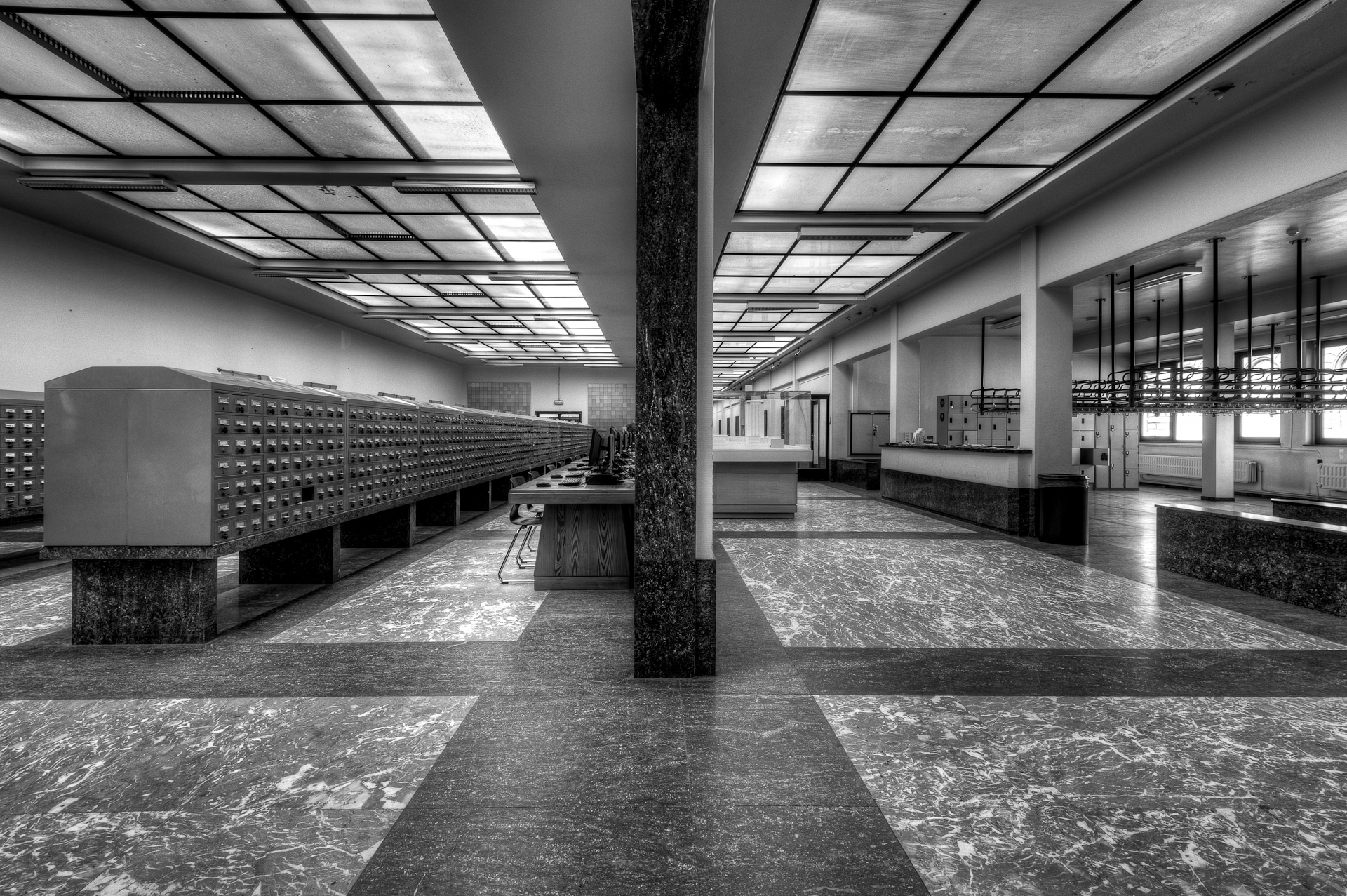
Catalogue and central corridor (2012)

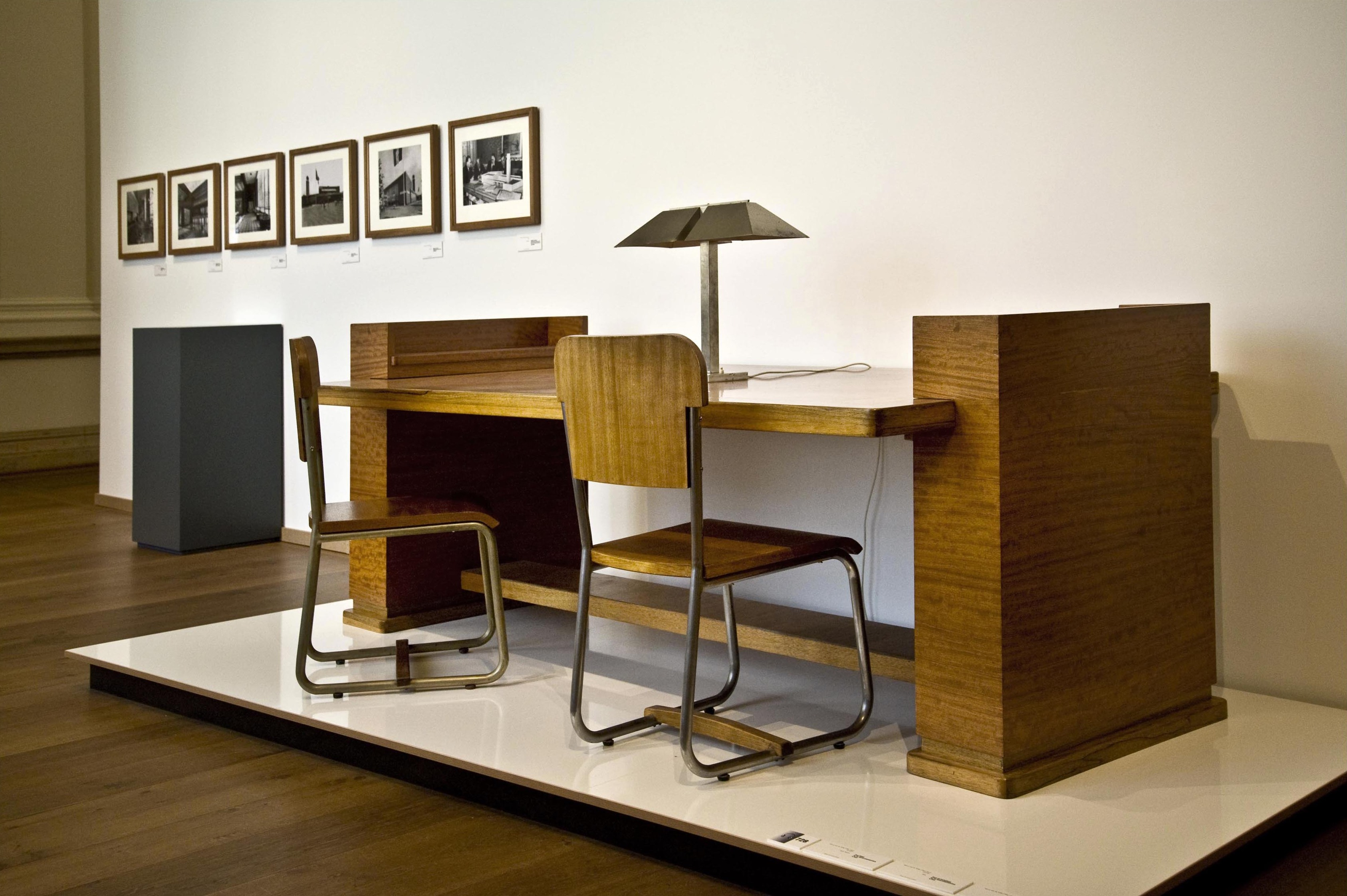
Furniture designed by Van de Velde for the Boekentoren, shown at a Weimar exhibition (2013)

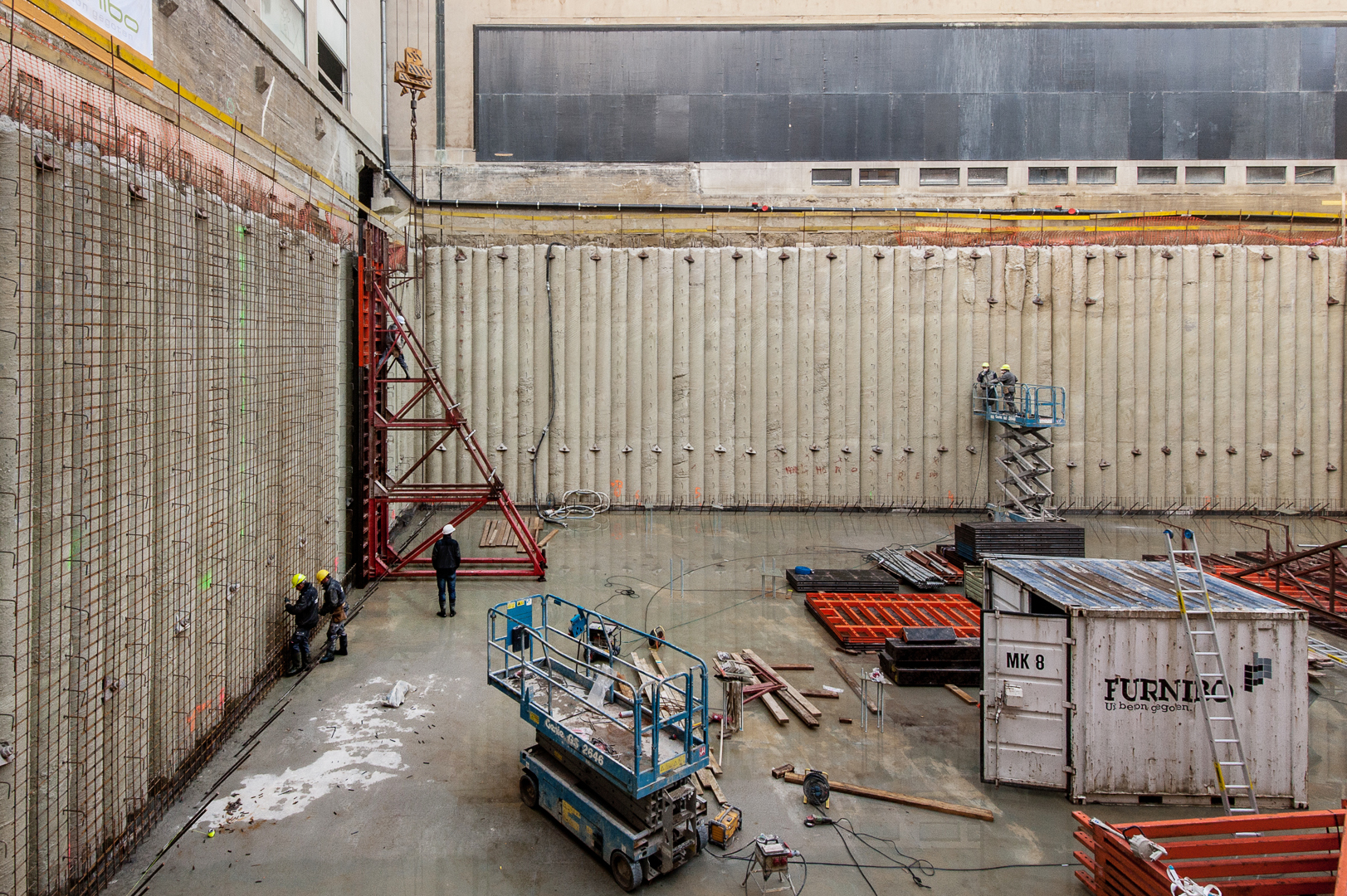
Construction of the underground repository under the inner garden (2012)
