= State Archives (Belgium) =

National archive institution of Belgium

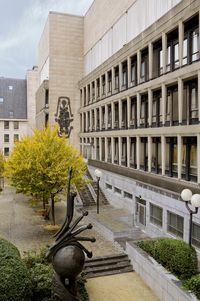
The National Archives (head office in Brussels)

The State Archives (Dutch: Rijksarchief; French: Archives de l'État (AE); German: Staatsarchiv) is the institution which preserves the national archives of Belgium. It is a research institute of the Belgian Federal Science Policy Office (Belspo) under the Belgian Federal Government.

The State Archives is composed of the National Archives in Brussels and 18 repositories throughout Belgium. Each repository has its own reading room, where the public can consult paper or digital archives in compliance with the rules and laws regarding the privacy of certain data.

As a knowledge centre for historical information and archival sciences, the State Archives preserve 325 kilometres (202 mi) of archives and 25 kilometres (16 mi) of books. Xavier Jacques-Jourion is the incumbent director-general.

== Administrative organization ==
The National Archives and State Archives in the Provinces is divided into 4 departments:

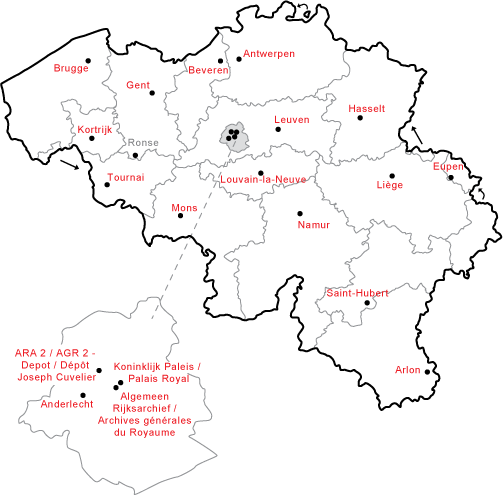
Map of the different State Archives repositories in Belgium

Department I - Archives in the Brussels-Capital Region

- National Archives of Belgium (French: Archives générales du Royaume) (head office)
- Belgian National Archives 2-Joseph Cuvelier repository
- Archives du Palais Royal (Belgium)
- State Archives in Brussels

Department II - Archives in the Flemish Provinces

- State Archives in Leuven
- State Archives in Kortrijk
- State Archives in Beveren
- State Archives in Hasselt
- State Archives in Ghent
- State Archives in Bruges

Department III - Archives in the Walloon Provinces and in the German-speaking Community

- State Archives in Eupen
- State Archives in Tournai
- State Archives in Namur
- State Archives in Mons
- State Archives in Louvain-la-Neuve
- State Archives in Liège
- State Archives in Arlon

Department IV

- Centre for the Study of War and Contemporary Society (CEGESOMA)

== Responsibilities ==
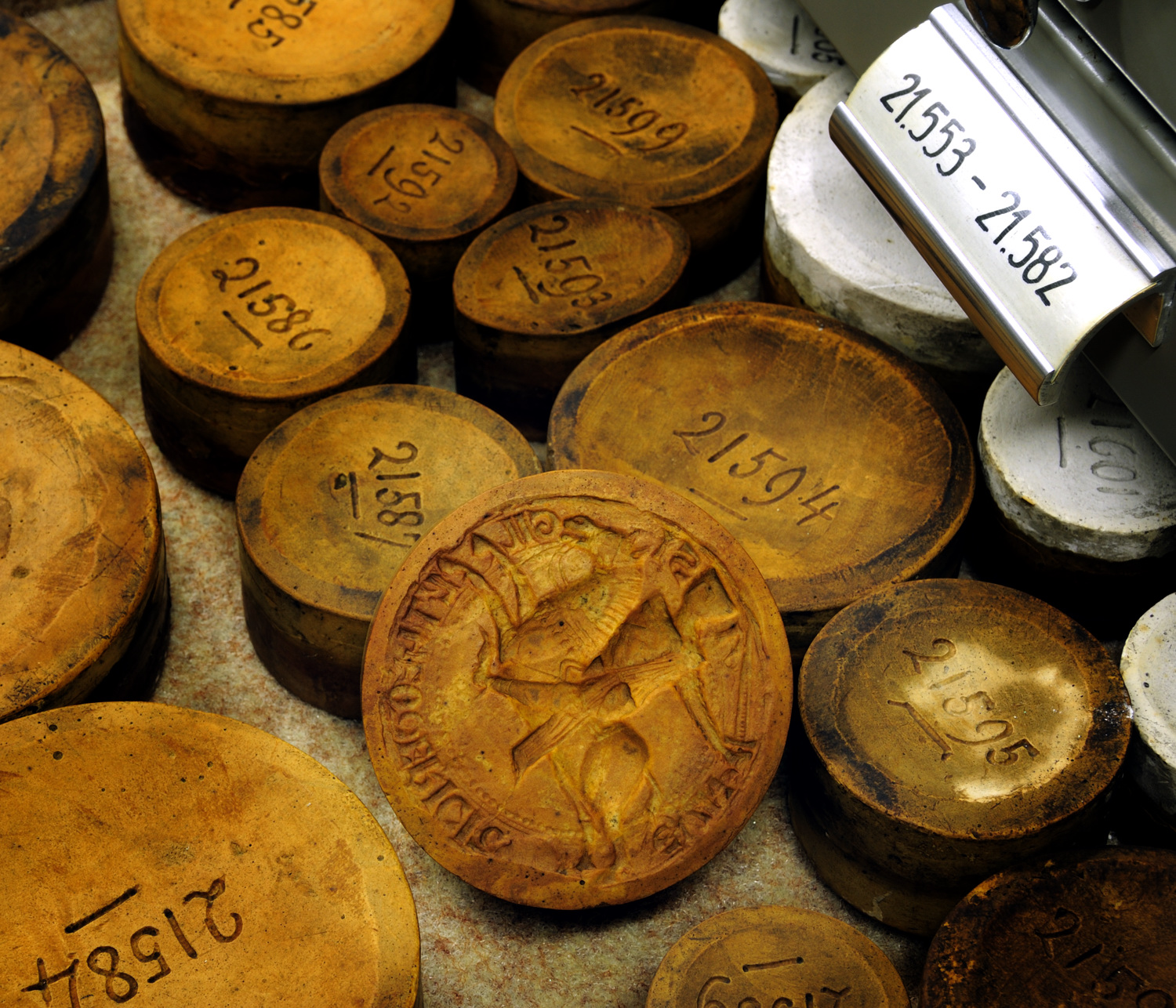
With over 38,000 pieces, the collection of seal molds of the State Archives of Belgium is the second largest of its kind in the world.

=== Conservation and preservation of the archival heritage ===
One of the key missions of the State Archives is the material preservation of the archives it holds. The pieces of archive are stored for long-term conservation in specially equipped stacks that comply with the highest standards for temperature, air humidity, fire and flooding safety. The documents are stored in folders and acid-free archive boxes foreseen with all necessary identification elements. Archives producers can purchase these acid-free archive boxes from the State Archives at a reasonable price. Archives deteriorated by the ravages of time are restored and rebound. Documents frequently consulted by the public (parish registers, civil status registers, maps, plans and drawings, old charters on parchment) are microfilmed and increasingly often digitized in order to avoid damages to the originals. The State Archives coordinates the archival policy at national level and fosters efficient international cooperation.

=== Archives supervision ===
The State Archives supervises the archives of the Belgian public authorities: courts, tribunals, administrations and public institutions. No document produced or received by the public authorities may be destroyed without prior authorization from the National Archivist or his delegates. This supervision of the public archives is assigned to the section “Archive supervision, reporting and co-ordination of archive collection and selection” of the State Archives, supervising the central services of the federal administration, and to the archivists of the State Archives repositories in the Provinces, supervising the external services of the federal administrations, the courts and tribunals of the judiciary and the regional and local administrations. The State Archives thus watches over the due conservation of archive documents produced and managed by Belgian public authorities. For this purpose, it issues directives and recommendations, carries out inspections, organizes training for public officers and provides advice about the construction and furniture of repositories and about the organization of the archives management within a public administration. The directives, brochures and recommendations can be downloaded from the website of the State Archives.

=== Acquisition of archives from public administrations and private archives ===
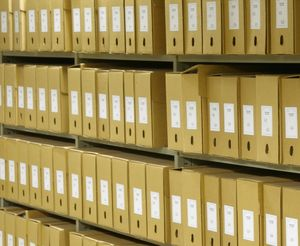
After selection, the archive documents are stored in boxes for long-term conservation.

The State Archives acquires and conserves (after selection) the archives older than 30 years of courts and tribunals, public administrations, notaries, as well as the private sector and private individuals (businesses, politicians, associations and societies, influential families, etc. having played an important role in social life). It ensures that public archives are transferred according to archival standards.

=== Service to the public ===
The State Archives makes the archives it conserves accessible to the public while respecting the private nature of certain data. It possesses reading rooms open to everyone in each of its 19 repositories. There, students, genealogists, historians, researchers, etc. can consult numerous archive documents in paper, microfilm or in digital format. Various publications to help with research (inventories, guides, etc.) are available in the reading rooms or can be purchased from the shop of the National Archives. Another priority of the State Archives is to make a maximum of information accessible via the Internet. A number of publications can be downloaded free of charge from the website of the institution. These concern, for instance, the church registers, many civil status registers older than 100 years, the proceedings of the Council of Ministers meetings from 1917 to 1979, etc. In order to make their vast collections known to the public, the State Archives regularly organizes thematic exhibitions in its different repositories, presenting archive documents in their wider social and cultural context. On the occasion of these events, a related catalogue, scientific dossier or brochure is published. Colloquia, symposia, conferences, seminars are organized for particular audiences. The State Archives also takes part in various other events (for instance: Open Monument Day) announced on the website of the institution, its Facebook page or via its Newsletter.

=== Making the archival heritage accessible for research ===
One of the main tasks of the scientific personnel is to make the huge amounts of archives conserved by the State Archives accessible by authoring scientific research instruments: research guides, archive guides and overviews, inventories, institutional studies. The purpose of these publications is to enable researchers to find as precisely as possible the information they are looking for within a reasonable time. The State Archives is a knowledge centre for historical information and archival sciences. The scientific personnel of the institution continuously carries out scientific research in archival sciences, conservation and institutional history of the archives producing institutions within the framework of the responsible fulfillment of the tasks mentioned afore, that is to say acquisition, conservation, intellectual control and making the archives accessible to the public. Scientific research As a scientific institution, the State Archives carries out scientific activities in those fields related to it by essence: archival science, conservation and history of archive producing institutions. It is indeed impossible to fulfill the tasks enumerated above (acquisition, conservation, intellectual control and making archives accessible to the public), if they do not continuously rely on scientific research. A significant part of the scientific activities of the State Archives takes place in close collaboration with universities.

=== Digitization of archives ===
The State Archives recently started a vast long-term project: the digitization of its archives. For this purpose, all State Archives repositories were equipped with digital reading rooms. Since August 2009, the digitized church registers and civil status registers from the whole country have been progressively put at the disposal of the public via the 19 reading rooms of the State Archives. As of January 2013, some 27,000 church registers and a steadily increasing number of civil status registers are also available free of charge on the website of the State Archives. Other types of documents can also be consulted on the website of the State Archives: proceedings of the Council of Ministers (1918–1979), the statistical yearbook of Belgium (and of Belgian Congo) from 1870, over 38,000 seal moulds, etc.

== History of the National Archives and State Archives in the Provinces ==
=== Austrian period (1714-1795) ===
The earliest origins of the Belgian State Archives lie in the Austrian period. In 1773, An Archives Office is set up in Brussels. This general and permanent repository was destined for the main archives of the Austrian Netherlands and formed a first yet timid centralization attempt by the public authorities.

=== From the French period (1795 - 1814) until the United Kingdom of the Netherlands (1815 – 1830) ===
The law of 7 Messidor of Year II [25 June 1794] leads to the creation of a central archives repository for the whole republic. It also establishes the fundamental but revolutionary principle that the archives of the nation are to be made accessible to the citizens. The Decree of 5 Brumaire of Year V (26 October 1796) orders the creation of one archives repository in each department. Repositories were thus established in all departments except Deux-Nèthes (province of Antwerp). In 1800 the passed under the authority of the secretary general of the prefecture. Curators paid by the state were first appointed in Brussels and Liège, later in Mons and Gent. By virtue of the Royal Decree of 17 December 1851, the state archives in the provinces are placed under the direction of the National Archivist of the Kingdom.

=== After the Independence of Belgium (1830 - present) ===
When Belgium became independent, state archives services were established in each chef-lieu of the following provinces: Bruges (1834), Namur (1849), Arlon (1851), Hasselt (1869), Antwerp (1896) and Tournai (from 1834 to 1895). In 1964, four district repositories were opened: in Huy (closed since February 2008), Kortrijk, Ronse (closed since September 2010) and Tournai. Auxiliary repositories were opened in Saint-Hubert (1960) and Beveren (1964). The State Archives repository in Eupen was created in 1988 following the second state reform of Belgium. The State Archives repositories in Leuven (2001), Anderlecht (2002) and Louvain-la-Neuve (2009) were established following the splitting of the province of Brabant. The National Archives 2 - Joseph Cuvelier repository will be inaugurated soon.

=== Importance of the office of National Archivist ===
In 1773, count Jean-Baptiste Goswin de Wynants (1726–1796) is appointed as first director general of the Archives of the Netherlands in Brussels. The National Archivist resided in Brussels, where the main archives service remained after the retreat of the Austrians and the arrival of the French. This service gained even more importance during the period of the United Kingdom of the Netherlands. In late 1814, Pierre Jean L’Ortye was appointed as “secrétaire archiviste” of the National Archives of Brussels and charged with the supervision of the conservation and management of the archives produced by the public bodies. In 1831, Louis Prosper Gachard, his deputy since 1826, succeeded him and became the first true National Archivist of the Kingdom. Gachard was in office from 1831 to 1885, until his death on the eve of Christmas.

=== The Belgian Law on Archives ===
The State Archives is ruled by the Law on Archives of 24 June 1955, amended by the law of 6 May 2009. In 2009, the retention period was lowered from one hundred to thirty years. This measure, in force after a transition period, is aimed to meet the expectations of the citizens who wish to carry out research about more recent history or genealogy. However, consultation of particular archives may be subject to limitations due to the legislation on the protection privacy and the legislation about the publicity of the civil status registers.

=== List of National Archivists ===
- Pieter-Jan L’Ortye (1814–1831) (Secretary-Archivist)
- Louis Prosper Gachard (1831–1885) (Secretary-Archivist from 1831 to 1859)
- Charles Piot (1886–1897)
- Alphonse Goovaerts (1898–1904)
- Arthur Gaillard (1904–1912) (acting)
- Joseph Cuvelier (1912–1935) (acting from 1912 to 1913)
- Dieudonné Brouwers (1936–1939)
- Camille Tihon (1939–1955)
- Etienne Sabbe (1955–1968)
- Maurits Vanhaegendoren (1968) (acting)
- Lucienne Van Meerbeeck (1968) (acting)
- Carlos Wyffels (1968–1987)
- Ernest Persoons (1987–2002)
- Daniel Van Overstraeten (2002–2003) (acting)
- Herman Coppens (2004–2005) (acting)
- Karel Velle (2005–2024)
- Pierre-Alain Tallier (2024) (acting)
- Xavier Jacques-Jourion (2024 - )

== See also ==
- List of archives in Belgium

== Bibliography ==
- Vanrie A., Bruxelles : les archives centrales et le quartier de la Cour : exposition organisée à l'occasion du bicentenaire des Archives de l'État : Bruxelles : Archives générales du royaume, 24 octobre 1996-13 décembre 1996, série Archives générales du Royaume et Archives de l'État dans les provinces. Service éducatif. Dossiers. Première série., Volume 16, Archives générales du Royaume, Bruxelles, 1996, 71 p.
- Coppens H. et Laurent R. (sous la dir.), Les Archives de l’État en Belgique, 1796-1996, Historique de l’institution et répertoire bio-bibliographique des archivistes, Archives générales du Royaume, Publ.2410, Bruxelles, 1996, 661 p.
