= National Archives of Belgium =

Coordinates: 50°50′33″N 4°21′24″E

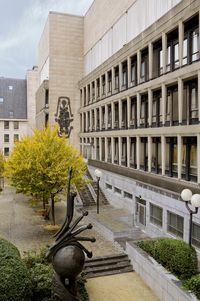
Front of the National Archives in Brussels

The National Archives of Belgium (Dutch: Algemeen Rijksarchief; French: Archives générales du Royaume; German: Generalstaatsarchiv; all lit. 'General Archives of the Kingdom') is the main depository of the State Archives of Belgium (Archives de l'État; Rijksarchief). It is located on the Rue de Ruysbroeck/Ruysbroeckstraat, next to the Mont des Arts/Kunstberg, in central Brussels. This archive repository holds over 70 kilometres (43 mi) of archives.

== Deposits ==
The National Archives preserves the archives of the central institutions of the Burgundian Netherlands, the Spanish Netherlands and the Austrian Netherlands until 1795, of the central public authorities of the French period (1795–1815) and of the United Kingdom of the Netherlands (1815–1830). It also holds the archives of the central institutions of the national, and later federal government, from the foundation of Belgium (1830) until today, except for the archives of the Ministries of Defence and of Foreign Affairs.

Among the preserved archives are:

- The archives of the government bodies and collateral colleges (Council of State, Privy Council, Council of Finance) and the archives of their legal successors (Royal Council of Philip V, Council of the General Government under Joseph II).
- The archives of the Court of Accounts.
- The archives of the secretariat that assisted the governor general and the government councils (Audience, Secretariat of State and War, German Secretariat of State).
- The subordinate offices created during the Austrian period to disengage the collateral councils from a given issue (Junta for Repayment, Jesuit Committee, Committee of the Religion Exchequer, etc.)
- The archives of the Courts of Justice: Great Council of Mechelen, Council of Troubles, etc.
- The archives of the Creation of Brussels Park and the Place Royale/Koningsplein, of the Palace of Charles of Lorraine, of the Bureau of the Works of the Court, etc.

Beside the public archives, the National Archives also preserves numerous private archives such as the archives of politicians who entrusted their records to the institution. The richness of those archives is also due to the sometimes voluminous archives of the most influential Belgian families handed over to the National Archives:

- The archives of the Houses of Arenberg, Merode, Ursel, etc.

Also worth mentioning:

- The cultural archives: records of the administration of the Theatre of La Monnaie (Brussels, 1771–1816), etc.
- The maps, plans, prints, manuscripts.
- Over two million individual files on foreigners, created as from 1839 when the Sûreté publique ('Public Safety Office') was charged with the control of all foreigners on Belgian territory.
- The collection of seal moulds (second-largest collection in the world).
- The digital documents (church registers) accessible via the digital reading room.
- Various publications mainly about the history of Belgium and in particular the history of Brabant, but also series of print sources: pamphlets, edicts and old ordinances, specialist journals and books on archival sciences, inventories of the archives preserved in other repositories in Belgium and abroad.

The National Archives is equipped with a reading room for the public. Researchers, historians, students, people interested in local and family history, etc. can consult the available documents while respecting the privacy of certain information. A number of exhibitions aimed at valorising the collections are organised in the entry hall and accessible to the public for free. Colloquia and study days are held on a regular basis for a learned public. The National Archives also houses the national coordination services of the institution.

== Digital reading room ==
Some 24,000 church registers from all over Belgium and an increasing number of civil status registers not older than 100 years can be viewed as digital images in the 19 reading rooms of the State Archives, including the reading room of the National Archives. Furthermore, researchers and victims of Nazi persecution or their relatives can consult, upon request and under certain conditions, the digital copy of the archives of the International Tracing Service (ITS) at the National Archives. This digital copy (over 80 million digital images, stored on roughly six terabytes) pertains to the civil victims of the Nazi regime and contains documents about labour, concentration and extermination camps, registration files about displaced persons, lists about forced labour and a central name index, the originals of which are preserved in Bad Arolsen, Germany. Since January 2013, the parish registers and civil status registers are also accessible for free via the website of the State Archives. Other types of digital documents available in the digital reading room or on the website of the State Archives are, for instance: the proceedings of the Councils of Ministers (1918–1979), the statistical yearbook of Belgium (and the Belgian Congo) since 1870, over 20,000 seal molds, etc.

The reading rooms in the different repositories are accessible to every holder of a valid reader’s card.

== See also ==
- List of archives in Belgium
- Académie Belgo-Espagnole d'Histoire

== Bibliography ==
- Muret P., Guide des fonds et collections des Archives générales du Royaume. Archives ecclésiastiques du Brabant : Doyennés, paroisses, collégiales, série Archives générales du Royaume et Archives de l'État dans les Provinces : Guides. Volume 17, Archives générales du Royaume, Brussels, 1994, 2 volumes.
- Soenen M., Guide des fonds et collections des Archives générales du Royaume. Institutions centrales des Pays-Bas sous l'Ancien Régime., série Archives générales du Royaume et Archives de l'État dans les Provinces : Guides. Volume 15, Archives générales du Royaume, Brussels, 1994, 589 p.
- Vanrie A., Guide des fonds et collections des Archives générales du Royaume. Archives scabinales et communales du Brabant, série Archives générales du Royaume et Archives de l'État dans les Provinces : Guides. Volume 16, Archives générales du Royaume, Brussels, 1995, 607 p.
- D'Hoore M., Archives de particuliers relatives à l'histoire de la Belgique contemporaine (de 1830 à nos jours), série Archives générales du Royaume et Archives de l'État dans les Provinces : Guides. Volume 40, Archives générales du Royaume, Brussels, 1998.
- Van Nieuwenhuysen A., completed by Laurent R., Guide des fonds et collections des Archives générales du Royaume : Archives de familles et de particuliers, série Archives générales du Royaume et Archives de l'État dans les Provinces : Guides. Volume 29, Archives générales du Royaume, Brussels, 1999, 233 p.
- Jacquemin, Madeleine (2007). "Les fonds d'archives d'entreprises conservés aux Archives générales du Royaume". In Aubry, Martine; Chave, Isabelle; Doom, Vincent (eds.). Archives, archivistes, archivistique dans l'Europe du Nord-Ouest du Moyen Âge à nos jours. Histoire et Littérature de l'Europe du Nord-Ouest (in French). Vol. 36. France: Publications de l’Institut de recherches historiques du Septentrion. pp. 81–89. doi:10.4000/hleno.148 – via OpenEdition Books.
- De Mecheleer L., Aperçu des instruments de recherche disponibles à la salle de lecture des Archives générales du Royaume : Situation au 1er janvier 2008, série Archives générales du Royaume et Archives de l'État dans les Provinces : Guides. Volume 67, Archives générales du Royaume, Brussels, 2008. Accessible on the website of the State Archives.
- Vanden Bosch H., Amara M. et D’Hooghe V., under the direction of Tallier P.-A., Guide des sources de la Première Guerre mondiale en Belgique, (Publ. 4921), Archives générales du Royaume, Brussels, 2010, 1057 p.
