= Godefroid Kurth =

Belgian historian and pioneering Christian democrat (1847–1916)

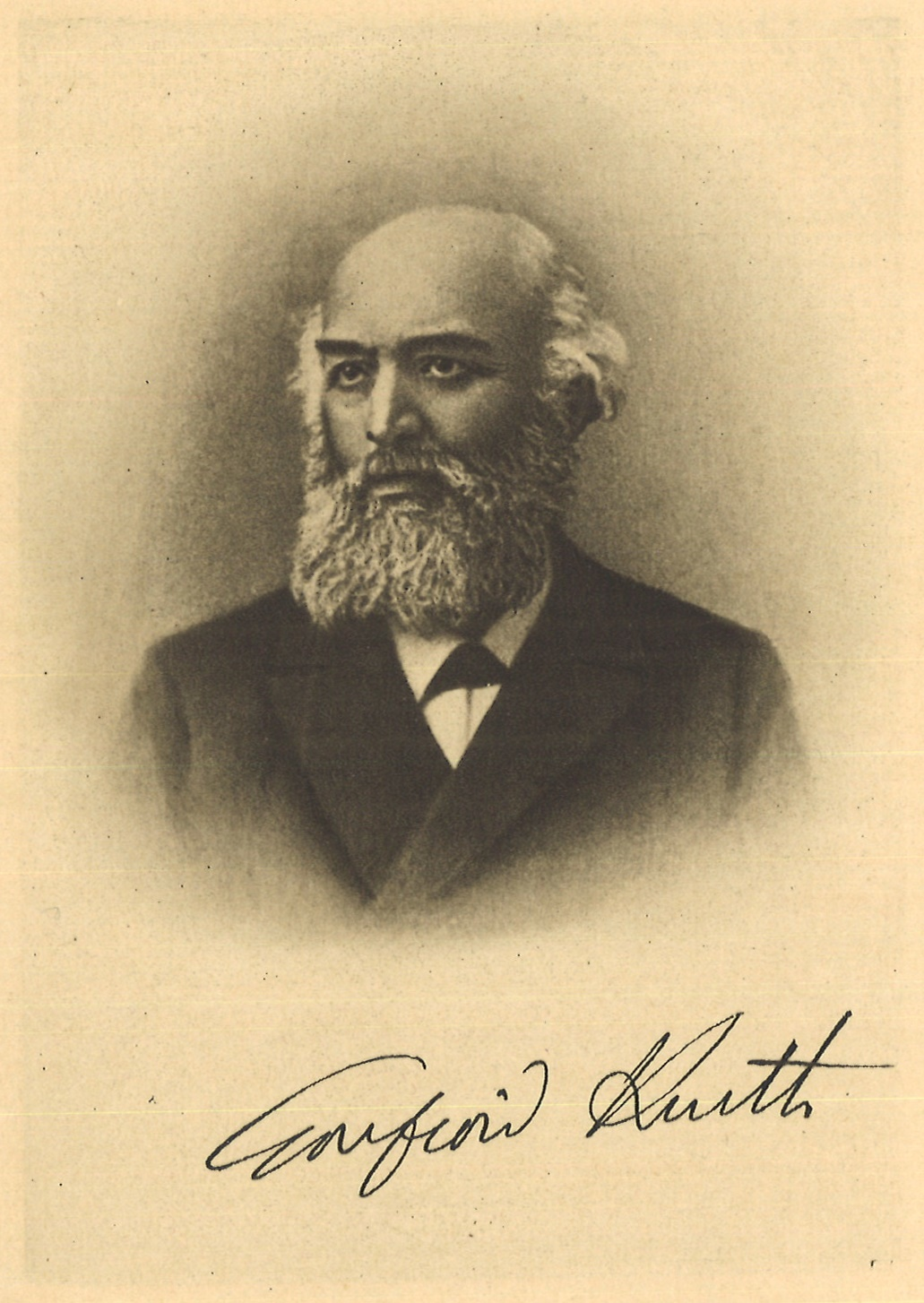
- Born: 11 May 1847; Arlon, province of Luxembourg, Belgium
- Died: 4 January 1916 (aged 68); Asse, Province of Brabant, Belgium
- Board member of: Belgian Historical Institute in Rome
- Awards: Prix quinquennal des Sciences historiques (1891); Commander in the Order of St Gregory the Great (1906); Commander in the Order of Leopold (1907); Honorary Doctorate from the Catholic University of Louvain (1912)

Academic background
- Education: Athénée royal d'Arlon
- Alma mater: University of Liège
- Thesis: 'Caton l'ancien, étude biographique' (1872)

Academic work
- Discipline: History
- Sub-discipline: History of Belgium, Medieval Europe
- Institutions: University of Liège
- Notable students: Henri Pirenne
- Main interests: Merovingian dynasty, History of Liège
- Notable works: Les Origines de la civilisation moderne (1886)

Godefroid Kurth (11 May 1847 – 4 January 1916) was a Belgian historian and pioneering Christian democrat. He is known for his histories of the city of Liège in the Middle Ages and of Belgium, his Catholic account of the formation of modern Europe in Les Origines de la civilisation moderne, and his defence of the medieval guild system.

== Early life ==
Godefroid Kurth was born on 11 May 1847 in Arlon, the capital of the Belgian province of Luxembourg. His father, a former soldier from Cologne who was naturalized as a Belgian in 1842, became a police commissioner in Arlon but died in 1850. The family spoke Luxembourgish at home, and he learned French in primary school. He was educated at the Athénée royal d'Arlon and the Liège Normal school, where he completed his studies in 1869. That same year he was appointed French master at the Athénée royal de Liège.

== Academic career ==
In 1873, Kurth became the first person to be awarded the "special doctorate in historical sciences", for a dissertation on Cato the Elder. The same year, he became chair of Medieval History and Belgian History at the University of Liège. One of his students, Henri Pirenne, became a noted historian. Léon-Ernest Halkin considered them the founders of the scientific method of history in Belgium. Kurth modeled his pedagogy on that instituted by the German historian Leopold von Ranke at the University of Berlin. On 7 May 1894 he was elected a member of the Royal Academy of Science, Letters and Fine Arts of Belgium. He was a member of the committee that organized the Exposition de l'art ancien au Pays de Liège for the 1905 International exposition in Liège.

In 1906, Kurth was promoted to emeritus status and left the university to take up the position of director of the Belgian Historical Institute in Rome. In 1908, a Festschrift was published in his honor, Mélanges Godefriod Kurth (Université de Liège, 1908). Halkin said of him, "Godefroid Kurth [was] the last of the romantic historians and the first of the 'technical' historians in Belgium."

== Political and social thought ==
In Liège, Kurth encountered difficulties because of his strongly held Catholic views, which were considered ultramontane by his contemporaries. He was an active member of the Society of Saint Vincent de Paul. In 1873, he was elected president of the Cercle catholique de l'Est, one of the predecessor bodies to the Catholic Party, which Kurth played a role in founding. He was also a pioneer of Christian democracy, helping organize the Social Congresses held in Liège in 1886, 1887, and 1890 that gave shape to Catholic social teaching. His study of the medieval guild system brought an increased appreciation for the principles of charity, brotherhood, and justice. Published in 1886, Les Origines de la civilisation moderne brought him an international reputation but was controversial in drawing a direct connection between the "civilizing principle" of Christianity and the development of modern civilization.

== Later life and death ==
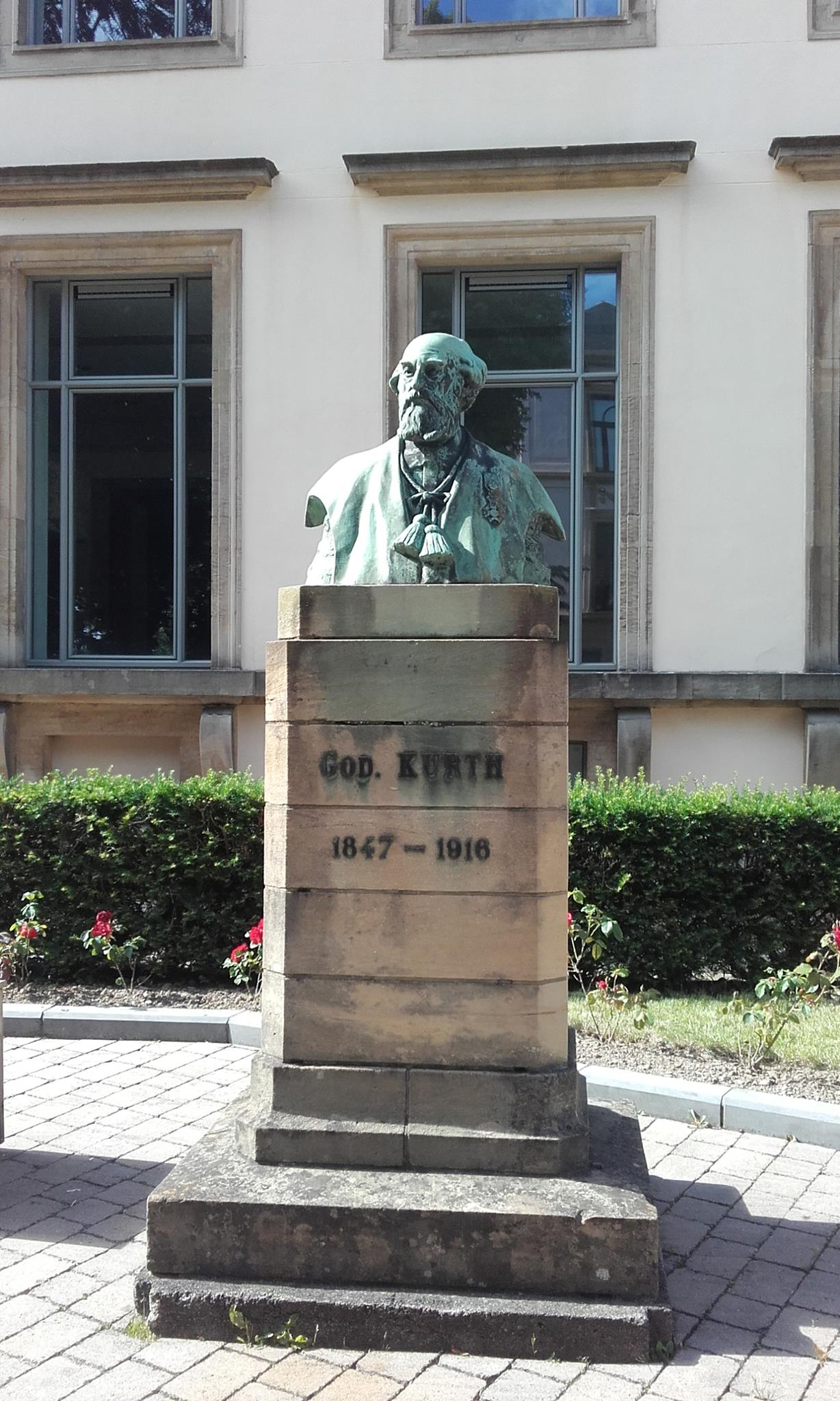
Monument in Arlon

Kurth, who had strong links with the German Centre Party and with German colleagues, was repulsed by the German invasion of Belgium and the accompanying atrocities. Over the summer and autumn of 1915, he gathered testimony of the atrocities, including the killings at Aarschot, but was placed in detention by the Germans in an unheated location. He contracted pneumonia and died at Asse on 4 January 1916. He was provisionally buried in Asse, and later exhumed and reburied in Arlon at St Martin's Church. There are streets named after him in both Arlon, Asse and Liège.

His work on the atrocities was published posthumously as Le Guet-apens prussien en Belgique ("The Prussian Ambush in Belgium"). Cardinal Désiré-Joseph Mercier wrote in the preface that Kurth, whose family origins were German, was "overwhelmed by the invasion, its iniquity, its atrocities, its sham".

In January 1950, KBR bought the letters sent by Kurth to his cousin, Jean-Pierre Waltzing.

== Honours and awards ==
- Prix quinquennal des Sciences historiques (1891)
- Commander in the Order of St Gregory the Great (1906)
- Commander in the Order of Leopold (1907)
- Honorary Doctorate of the Catholic University of Leuven (1912)

== Works ==
Godefroid Kurth wrote over 500 books and journal articles, including contributions to the Catholic Encyclopedia. His "style is consciously literary, lively, and flamboyant. However, Kurth's version of history is notably technical, founded on rigorous principles of historical criticism, extensive mastery of philology and profound knowledge of the sources and other works." His Clovis (1895), Notger de Liège (1905), and La cité de Liège au Moyen-âge (1909–1910) remain indispensable reference works.

=== Books ===
- Caton l'ancien, étude biographique (Bruges, Daveluy, 1872), online
- Analectes pour servir à l’histoire d’Arlon (Arlon, Institut archéologique du Luxembourg, 1880)
- Les origines de la ville de Liège (Liège, L. Grandmont-Danders, 1883)
- Les Origines de la civilisation moderne (Louvain, Ch. Peeters, 1886), online
- Histoire poétique des Mérovingiens (Brussels, Société belge de librairie, 1893), online
- La Frontière linguistique en Belgique et dans le nord de la France (Brussels, Société belge de librairie, 1896)
- Das deutsche Belgien und der Deutsche Verein (Arlon and Aubel, Willems, 1896)
- Clovis, le fondateur (Paris, Éditions Tallandier, 1896; reprinted 2000, ISBN 2235022669)
  - Clovis (Tours, Alfred Mame et Fils, 1906), online
- L'Église aux tournants de l'histoire (Brussels, Société belge de librairie, 1900)
- Saint Boniface (Paris, Lecoffre, 1902), online
- Notger de Liège et la civilisation au Xe siècle (Paris, Brussels and Liège, A. Picard, O. Schepens, and L. Demarteau, 1905), online
- La Cité de Liège au Moyen-Âge (3 vols., Liège, Dewit, Cormaux et Demarteau, 1909–1910), vol. 1, vol. 2, vol. 3
- Etude critique sur Jean d'Outremeuse (Mémoires de l'Académie royale de Belgique, Classe des Lettres et des Sciences Morales et Politiques, 7; Brussels, 1910), online
- Histoire des croix miraculeuses d’Assche (Asse, Imprimerie Frans Van Achter, 1912)
- Mizraim, souvenirs d'Égypte (Albert Dewit, 1912), online
- La Nationalité belge (Namur, Picard-Balon, 1913), online
- Études franques (2 vols., Paris and Brussels, Honoré Champion and Albert Dewitte, 1919), vol. 1, vol. 2
- Le Guet-apens prussien en Belgique (Paris, H. Champion, 1919)
- La chronique de Jean de Hocsem (Brussels, Kiessling, 1927), online

Articles, lectures and pamphlets

- "Notice sur un manuscrit d'Hariger et d'Anselme, conservé à l'abbaye d'Averbode", Bulletin de la Commission royale d'Histoire, 4th series, vol. 2 (1875), pp. 377–394, online
- "Saint Grégoire de Tours et les études classiques au VIe siècle", Revue des questions historiques, 24 (1878), pp. 586–593, online
- "La Loi de Beaumont en Belgique", Mémoires couronnés et autres mémoires, 31 (1881), pp. 769–790, online
- "Une biographie de l'évêque Notger au XIIe siècle", Bulletin de la Commission royale d'Histoire, 4th series, vol. 17 (1891), pp. 3–60 online
- La lèpre en Occident avant les Croisades (Paris, Alphonse Picard, 1891), a lecture delivered to the Congrès scientifique international des catholiques, held in Paris, April, 1891, online
- Les Corporations ouvrières au moyen-âge (Brussels, Société belge de librairie, 1893)
- Qu’est-ce que le moyen âge? lecture to the Congrès international des catholiques in Fribourg, 19 August 1897, online
- "Les Nationalités en Auvergne au VIe siècle", Bulletins de l'Académie Royale des Sciences, des Lettres et des Beaux-Arts de Belgique, 4 (1900), pp. 224–242, online
- "Les Ducs et les comtes d'Auvergne au VIe siècle", Revue d'Auvergne, September 1900
- "Comment Philippe II travaillait", in Mélanges Paul Frédéricq : hommage de la société pour le progrès des études philologiques et historiques (Brussels, H. Lamertin, 1904), pp. 289–293, online, contribution to the Festschrift for Paul Fredericq.
- "Les origines de la Commune de Liège", Bulletin de l'institut archéologique liégeois, 35 (1905), pp. 229–324 online
- "Ce que demandent les Allemands", Le Vingtième Siècle, 1906
- "Recherche sur l'origine des paroisses de Liège", Bulletin de la Société d'art et d'histoire du diocèse de Liège, 16 (1907), pp. 227–251, online
- "Notre nom national", Bulletin de la Commission Royale d'Histoire, 78 (1909), pp. CII-CXXII, online
- Preface to Marie de Villermont, L'Infante Isabelle: Gouvernante des Pays-Bas (Tamines and Paris, 1912) online
- "L'édit de Milan (313)", Revue sociale catholique, 17 (1912), pp. 65–73, online
- "Etude critique sur la vie de Sainte Geneviève", Revue d'Histoire Ecclésiastique 14 (1913), pp. 5–80, online
