= Ecclesiastical history of the Catholic Church =

Ecclesiastical history of the Catholic Church refers to the history of the Catholic Church as an institution, written from a particular perspective. There is a traditional approach to such historiography. The generally identified starting point is Eusebius of Caesarea, and his work Church History.

Since there is no assumption that contemporary historians of the Catholic Church who are also Catholics adopt this perspective, this “traditional approach” is a chapter of historiography, not yet closed, but applying to a definite area that is not central to the academic history of the 20th and 21st centuries.

== Approach, traditional Catholic view ==
According to the Catholic Encyclopedia of 1913,

Ecclesiastical history is the scientific investigation and the methodical description of the temporal development of the Church considered as an institution founded by Jesus Christ and guided by the Holy Ghost for the salvation of mankind. ...[It covers] the life of the Church in all its manifestations from the beginning of its existence to our own day among the various divisions of mankind hitherto reached by Christianity. While the Church remains essentially the same despite the changes which she undergoes in time, these changes help to exhibit more fully her internal and external life.

Its branches therefore include:

- History of missions, in the widest sense
- History of ecclesiastical polity, of heresies and their opponents, and of the relations of the Church with non-Catholic religious associations
- History of dogma, of ecclesiastical theology, and ecclesiastical sciences in general
- History of liturgy
- History of ecclesiastical art
- History of the Catholic hierarchy, of the constitution and canon law of the Church
- History of religious orders
- History of discipline, religious life, Christian civilization

=== Methods ===
Critical treatment of the sources requires palaeography, diplomatics, and criticism.

Apart from that, the approach is not that of a skeptic:

The ecclesiastical historian … can by no means exclude the possibility of supernatural factors. That God cannot intervene in the course of nature, and that miracles are therefore impossible is an assumption which has not been and cannot be proved, and which makes a correct appreciation of facts in their objective reality impossible. Herein appears the difference between the standpoint of the believing Christian historian, who bears in mind not only the existence of God but also the relations of creatures to Him, and that of the rationalistic and infidel historian, who rejects even the possibility of Divine intervention in the course of natural law.

It is based in teleology:

The Christian historian keeps in view the fact that the founder of the Church is the Son of God, and that the Church was instituted by Him in order to communicate to the whole human race, with the assistance of the Holy Spirit, its salvation through Christ. It is from this standpoint that the Christian historian estimates all particular events in their relation to the end or purpose of the Church. The unbelieving historian on the other hand recognizing only natural forces both at the origin and throughout the development of Christianity, and rejecting the possibility of any supernatural intervention is incapable of appreciating the work of the Church in as far as it is the agent of Divine design.

As well as taking the Church as its subject matter, it is Church-centered, and takes the Church's teachings at their own estimation:

The Catholic historian insists on the supernatural character of the Church, its doctrines, institutions, and standards of life, in so far as they rest on Divine revelation, and acknowledge the continual guidance of the Church by the Holy Ghost. All this is for him objective reality, certain truth, and the only foundation for the true, scientific pragmatism of ecclesiastical history.

=== Universality ===
The fact that schisms have occurred in Christian history is subordinated to the claim to universality of the Catholic Church, which is not treated as one church among many:

The Catholic historian does not admit that the various forms of the Christian religion may be taken, roughly speaking, as a connected whole, nor does he consider them one and all as so many imperfect attempts to adapt the teachings and institutions of Christ to the changing needs of the times, nor as progressive steps towards a future higher unity wherein alone we must seek the perfect ideal of Christianity. There is but one Divine revelation given us by Christ, but one ecclesiastical tradition based on it; hence one only Church can be the true one, i. e. the Church in which the aforesaid revelation is found in its entirety, and whose institutions have developed on the basis of this revelation and under the guidance of the Holy Spirit.

On the other hand, the effect of churches outside the Catholic Church is factored into the discussion.

== Traditional periodization ==
=== First Period ===
The foundation of the Church and the development of fixed standards of ecclesiastical life within the limits of Græco-Roman civilization.

=== Second Period ===
The Church as a major force in the new Romanic, German, and Slavic states of Europe, the secession of Oriental Christendom from ecclesiastical unity and the final overthrow of the Byzantine Empire.

=== Third Period ===
The collapse of religious unity among the Western European nations, and the reformation from within of Catholic Church faced with Protestantism. Immense geographical expansion of the Church, with missionaries in South America, part of North America and numerous in Asia and Africa.

=== Turning points ===
Some considered the pontificate of Gregory the Great in 590, or, more generally, the end of the 6th and the middle of the 7th century as the close of the first period; others took the Sixth General Council in 680, or the Trullan synod of 692, or the end of the 7th century; others again close the first period with St. Boniface, or with the Iconoclasts, or with Charlemagne. For the West, Kraus regards the beginning of the 7th century as the close of the first period; for the East, the end of the same century.

Similarly, along the line of division between the second and the third periods are crowded events of great importance to ecclesiastical life: the Renaissance with its influence upon all intellectual life, the conquest of Constantinople by the Turks, the discovery of the Americas and the new problems which the Church had to solve in consequence, the appearance of Luther and the heresy of Protestantism, the Council of Trent with its decisive influence on the evolution of the interior life of the Church. Protestant historians have regarded the appearance of Luther as the beginning of the third period. A few Catholic authors (e.g. Kraus) closed the second period with the middle of the 15th century.

Nor do authors perfectly agree on the turning-points which are to be inserted within the chief periods. It is true that the conversion of Constantine the Great affected the life of the Church so profoundly that the reign of this first Christian emperor is generally accepted as marking a sub-division in the first period. In the second period, especially prominent personalities usually mark the limits of the several sub-divisions, e.g. Charlemagne, Gregory VII, Boniface VIII, though this leads to the undervaluation of other important factors, e. g. the Greek Schism, the Crusades. Recent writers, therefore, assume other boundary lines which emphasize the forces active in the life of the Church rather than prominent personalities. In subdividing the third period the same difficulty presents itself. Many historians consider the French Revolution at the end of the 18th century as an event of sufficient importance to demand a new epoch; others see a distinct epochal line in the Treaty of Westphalia (1648), with which the formation of great Protestant territories came to an end.

== Sources ==
Sources fall naturally into two classes:

1. Remains (reliquiae, Ueberreste) or immediate sources, i. e. such as prove a fact directly, being themselves part or remnant of the fact. To this class belong e. g. liturgical customs, ecclesiastical institutions, acts of the popes and councils, art-products, etc.; also monuments set up to commemorate events, e. g. inscriptions.
2. Tradition or mediate sources, i. e. such as rest upon the statements of witnesses who communicate an event to others. Tradition may be oral (narrative and legends), written (writings of particular authors), or pictorial (pictures, statues).

=== Remains ===
The remains of the Church's past, which give direct evidence of historical facts, are the following:

1. Inscriptions, i.e. texts written on durable material, which were either meant to perpetuate the knowledge of certain acts or which describe the character and purpose of a particular object. The Christian inscriptions of different epochs and countries are now accessible in numerous collections.
2. Monuments erected for Christian purposes, especially tombs, sacred edifices, monasteries, hospitals for the sick and pilgrims; objects used in the liturgy or private devotions.
3. Liturgies, rituals, particularly liturgical books of various kinds, which were once used in Divine service.
4. Necrologies and confraternity-books used at the prayers and public services for the living and the dead.
5. Papal acts, Bulls and Briefs to a great extent edited in the papal "Bullaria", "Regesta", and special ecclesiastico-national collections.
6. Acts and decrees of general councils and of particular synods.
7. Collections of official decrees of Roman congregations, bishops, and other ecclesiastical authorities.
8. Rules of faith (symbola fldei) drawn up for the public use of the Church, various collections of which have been made.
9. Official collections of ecclesiastical laws juridically obligatory for the whole Church.
10. Rules and constitutions of orders and congregations.
11. Concordats between the ecclesiastical and the secular power.
12. Civil laws, since they often contain matters bearing on religion or of ecclesiastical interest.

=== Tradition ===
These comprise those sources which rest on tradition alone, and which, unlike the remains, are themselves no part of the fact. They are:

1. Collections of acts of the martyrs, of legends and lives of the saints.
2. Collections of lives of the popes (Liber Pontificalis) and of bishops of particular Churches.
3. Works of ecclesiastical writers, which contain information about historical events; to some extent all ecclesiastical literature belongs to this category.
4. Ecclesiastico-historical works, which take on more or less the character of sources, especially for the time in which their authors lived.
5. Pictorial representations (paintings, sculptures, etc.).

== Auxiliary sciences ==
Special auxiliary sciences (e. g. epigraphy, palaeography, numismatics) deal with certain particular kinds of the above-mentioned sources.

1. The study of the languages of the sources, which necessitates the use of lexicons, either general or special (i. e. for the language of particular authors).
2. Palaeography, a methodical introduction to the reading and dating of all kinds of manuscript sources. It was first scientifically investigated and formulated by Mabillon, De re diplomaticâ (Paris, 1681).
3. Diplomatics, which teaches how to examine critically the form and content of historical documents (e. g. charters, privileges), to pronounce on their genuineness, to understand them correctly, and to use them methodically. It is usually combined with paleography.
4. Historical Methodology, which enables the student to treat in a correct and critical way all the sources known to him and to combine the results of his researches in a methodical narrative.
5. Bibliography, the practical science of finding quickly the literature bearing on a given ecclesiastico-historical subject.
6. Chronology: how to recognize and fix with accuracy the dates found in the sources. The first important chronological investigations were undertaken by Scaliger (De emendatione temporum, Jena, 1629-), Petavius (Rationarium temporum, Leyden, 1624; De doctrinâ temporum, Antwerp, 1703), and the authors of Art de vérifier les dates des faits historiques (Paris, 1750-).
7. Ecclesiastical Geography and Statistics: the first teaches us to recognize the places in which historical events took place, the other represents the development of the Church and the actual condition of her institutions exhibited synoptically, in tables with corresponding figures, etc.
8. Epigraphy, a guide for the reading and methodical use of the Christian inscriptions on monuments.
9. Christian Archaeology and History of the Fine Arts, from which the student learns how to study scientifically and to use the monuments which owe their origin to Christian influences.
10. Numismatics, the science of the coins of various countries and ages. Since not only the popes but also the numerous bishops, who once possessed secular power, exercised the right of coinage, numismatics belongs, at least for certain epochs, to the auxiliary sciences of church history.
11. Sphragistics, or the science of seals (Gk. spragis, a seal). Its object is the study of the various seals and stamps used in sealing letters and documents as a guarantee of their authenticity.
12. Heraldry, which teaches the student how to read accurately the coats of arms etc., used by ecclesiastical and secular lords. It frequently throws light on the family of historical personages, the time or character of particular events, the history of religious monuments.

== Historians ==
The peoples among which Christianity first spread, possessed a highly developed civilization and a literature rich in works of history. Chronicles were compiled in the 3rd century by Julius Africanus and by Hippolytus of Rome, some fragments of which survive. It is only during the 4th century that ecclesiastical history, properly so called, makes its appearance.

=== Church historians during the First Period ===
Eusebius, a fourth-century Bishop of Caesarea, is sometimes called the "Father of Church History". His major work is the ten-book Church History, covering Christian history from the death of Christ to the 323 victory of Constantine over Licinius. The work is heavily partial towards Constantine, minimizing his faults and presenting him in the most favorable light possible.

A number of Christian historians wrote in the early 5th century, but their works have been mostly or entirely lost. These authors include Philip of Side, Philostorgius, Hesychius of Jerusalem, Timotheus of Berytus, and Sabinus of Heraclea.

About the middle of the 5th century, Socrates Scholasticus, Hermias Sozomenus, and Theodoret all wrote continuations of Eusebius's Church History. Of these, Theodoret's continuation is most thorough, drawing on the writings of Socrates and Hermias as well as other historical documents. Theodoret also wrote a History of the Monks, which, together with the 420 Historia Lausiaca, is a principal source for the history of Oriental monasticism. Theodoret's Compendium of Heretical Falsehoods, together with the Panarion of Epiphanius of Salamis, offers material on early heresies.

During the 6th century these historians found other continuators. Theodorus Lector compiled a brief compendium from the works of the above-mentioned three continuators of Eusebius: Socrates, Sozomen, and Theodoret. He then wrote in two books an independent continuation of this summary as far as the reign of Emperor Justin I (518-27); only fragments of this work have reached us. Zacharias Rhetor, at first an advocate at Berytus in Phoenicia and then (at least from 536) Bishop of Mitylene in the Island of Lesbos, composed, while yet a layman, an ecclesiastical history, which describes the period from 450 to 491, but is mostly taken up with personal experiences of the author in Egypt and Palestine. A Syriac version of this work is extant as books III-VI of a Syriac universal history, while there are also extant some chapters in a Latin version. Apart from this history, his inclination towards Monophysitism is also apparent from his biography of the Monophysite patriarch, Severus of Antioch, and from his biography of the monk Isaias, two works extant in a Syriac version. More important still is the "Church History" of Evagrius Scholasticus, who died about the end of the 6th century. His work is a continuation of Socrates, Sozomen, and Theodoret, and treats in six books the period from 431 to 594. It is based on good sources, and borrows from profane historians but occasionally Evagrius is too credulous. For Nestorianism and Monophysitism, however, his work deserves careful attention.

Among the chronicles that belong to the close of Græco-Roman antiquity, special mention is due to the Chronicon Paschale, so called because the Paschal or Easter canon forms the basis of its Christian chronology. About the year 700 the Monophysite bishop, John of Nikiu (Egypt) compiled a universal chronicle; its notitiae are of great value for the 7th century. This chronicle has been preserved in an Ethiopic version (Chronique de Jean, évêque de Nikiou, publ. par. H. Zotenberg, Paris, 1883). Zotenberg believes that the work was originally written in Greek and then translated; Nöldeke (Gottinger gelehrte Anzeigen, 1881, 587 sqq.) thinks it more probable that the original was Coptic. Alexandrian Cosmas (the "Indian Voyager") prepared a Christian "topography" of great value for ecclesiastical geography (ed. Montfaucon, Collectio nova Patrum et Scriptor. græc, II, Paris, 1706; translated into English by McCrindle, London, 1897). Of great value also for ecclesiastical geography are the Notitiae episcopatuum (Taktika), or lists of the patriarchal, metropolitan, and episcopal sees of the Greek Church (Hieroclis Synecdemus et Notitiae graecae episcopatuum, ed. Parthey, Berlin, 1866; Georgii Cyprii Descriptio orbis Romani, ed. Geizer, Leipzig, 1890). A major collection of the early Greek historians of the Church is that of Henri de Valois in three folio volumes (Paris, 1659–73; improved by William Reading, Cambridge, 1720); it contains Eusebius, Socrates, Sozomen, Theodoret, Evagrius, and the fragments of Philostorgius and Theodorus Lector.

The ancient Syrian writings of ecclesiastico-historical interest are chiefly Acts of martyrs and hymns to the saints (Acta martyrum et sanctorum, ed. Bedjan, Paris, 1890-). The Chronicle of Edessa, based on ancient sources, was written in the 6th century (ed. Assemani, Bibliotheca orientalis, I, 394). In the same century the Monophysite bishop, John of Ephesus, wrote a history of the Church, but only its third part (571 to 586) is preserved (ed. William Cureton, Oxford, 1853; tr., Oxford, 1860). Lengthy extracts from the second part are found in the annals of Dionysius of Telmera. His work covers the years 583-843 (fragments in Assemani, Bibliotheca orientalis, II, 72 sqq.). The most important native Armenian chronicle of an ecclesiastico-historical character is ascribed to Moses of Chorene, a historical personage of the 5th century. The author of the "History of Greater Armenia" calls himself Moses of Chorene, and claims to have lived in the 5th century and to have been a disciple of the famous St. Mesrop (q. v.). The self-testimony of the compiler must be rejected, since the work makes use of sources of the 6th and 7th centuries, and there is no trace of it to be found in Armenian literature before the 9th century. Probably, therefore, it originated about the 8th century. In the known manuscripts the work contains three parts: the Genealogy of Greater Armenia extends to the dynasty of the Arsacides, the Middle Period of our Ancestry to the death of St. Gregory the Illuminator, and the End of the History of our Country to the downfall of the Armenian Arsacides (ed. Amsterdam, 1695; Venice, 1881; French translation in Langlois, Collection des historiens anciens et modernes de l'Arménie, 2 vols., Paris, 1867–9). In the Middle Ages there was still extant a fourth part. The work seems to be on the whole reliable. The ancient history, down to the 2nd or 3rd century after Christ, is based on popular legends. Another Armenian historian is Eliseus Vartaped (q. v.).

Comprehensive ecclesiastico-historical works appear in the Latin West later than in the Greek East. The first beginnings of historical science are confined to translations with additions. Thus St. Jerome translated the Chronicle of Eusebius and continued it down to 378. At the same time he opened up a special field, the history of Christian literature, in his De viris illustribus; (Chronicon, ed. Schoene, 2 vols., Berlin, 1866–75; De vir. ill., ed. Richardson, Leipzig, 1896). About 400 the Church History of Eusebius was translated by Rufinus who added the history of the Church from 318 to 395 in two new books (X and XI). Rufinus's continuation was itself soon translated into Greek. The latest edition is in the Berlin collection of Greek Christian writings mentioned above in connexion with Eusebius. St. Jerome's Latin recension of the Chronicle of Eusebius was followed later by many other chronicles, among which may be mentioned the works of Prosper, Idacius, Marcellinus, Victor of Tununum, Marius of Avenches, Isidore of Seville, and Venerable Bede. In the West, the first independent history of revelation and of the Church was written by Sulpicius Severus, who published in 403 his Historia (Chronica) Sacra in two books; it reaches from the beginning of the world to about 400 (P. L., XX; ed. Hahn, Vienna, 1866). It is a short treatise and contains little historical information. A little later, Orosius wrote his Historia adversus paganos in seven books—a universal history from the standpoint of the Christian apologist. It begins with the deluge and comes down to 416. The purpose of Orosius was to refute the pagan charge that the great misfortunes of the Roman Empire were due to the victory of Christianity (P. L., XXXI; ed. Zangemeister, Vienna, 1882). With the same end in view, but with a far grander and loftier conception, St. Augustine wrote his famous De civitate Dei, composed between 413 and 428, and issued in sections. It is an apologetic philosophy of history from the standpoint of Divine revelation. The work is important for church history on account of its numerous historical and archaeological digressions (ed. Dombart, 2nd ed., Leipzig, 1877). About the middle of the 6th century, Cassiodorus caused the works of Socrates, Sozomen, and Theodoret to be translated into Latin, and then amalgamated this version into one complete narrative under the title Historia tripartita (P. L., LXIX-LXX). Together with the works of Rufinus and Orosius, it was one of the principal sources from which through the Middle Ages the Western peoples drew their knowledge of early church history. Rich material for ecclesiastical history is also contained in the national histories of some Western peoples. Of the History of the Goths, written by Cassiodorus, the only surviving part is an extract in Jordanis, De origine actibusque Getarum (ed. Mommsen in Mon. Germ. Hist: Auct. antiquissimi, V., Berlin, 1882). Especially important is the History of the Franks in ten books by Gregory of Tours, which reaches to 591 (ed. Arndt, Mon. Germ. Hist: Scriptores rerum Meroving, I, Hanover, 1884–5). Gregory wrote also a Liber de vitâ Patrum, a work entitled In gloriâ martyrum, and the book De virtutibus (i.e. miracles) S. Juliani and De virtutibus S. Martini (ed. cit., pt. II, ad. Krusch). In the beginning of the 7th century St. Isidore of Seville composed a Chronicle of the West Goths (Historia de regibus Gothorum, Vandalorum et Suevorum, ed. Mommsen, Chronica Minora, II, 241–303). Several other similar chronicles, from the 4th to the 7th century, were edited by Mommsen in the Monumenta Germaniae Historica: Auctores Antiquissimi under the title of Chronica Minora.

=== The Church historians of the Second Period ===
The second period of church history produced a copious specialized historical literature. Its works deal more often with particular nations, dioceses, and abbeys; general histories are rare. Moreover, owing to the dominant position of the Church among the Western peoples, ecclesiastical and secular history are in this epoch closely interwoven.

In the East church history is almost completely identified with the history of the imperial court owing to the close relations of State and Church. For the same reason the Byzantine chronicles from Justinian the Great to the destruction of the empire in the middle of the 15th century contain information about the history of the Greek Church. The major church historian of the Byzantine period is Nicephorus Callistus, who flourished in the beginning of the 14th century.

One major Syriac source is the aforesaid chronicle of Dionysius of Telmera. Towards the end of the 12th century Michael Kandis, Patriarch of the Jacobites (died 1199), wrote a chronicle from the creation to 1196. It is an important source for the history of the Syriac Church after the 6th century, particularly for the history of the Crusades. Another patriarch of the Jacobites, Gregory Abulpharagius or Bar-Hebraeus, Maphrian (i. e. primate) of the Syro-Jacobite Church (1266–86), also wrote a universal chronicle in three parts. Other works include the Bibliotheca (Myriobiblon) of Photios I of Constantinople (died 891), in which about 280 authors are described and passages quoted from them, and the work On Heresies of St. John Damascene.

Throughout this period the West was furnishing abundant material for ecclesiastical history, but few genuinely historical works. In the 9th century, Haymo, Bishop of Halberstadt (died 853), undertook to write an ecclesiastical history of the first four centuries, taking Rufinus as his principal authority. Subsequently, with the aid of Latin versions of Georgius Syncellus, Nicephorus, and especially of Theophanes, to which he added his own material, the Roman Abbot Anastasius Bibliothecarius (the Librarian) wrote a Church History to the time of Leo the Armenian, who died in 829.

About the middle of the 12th century, Ordericus Vitalis, Abbot of St. Evroul in Normandy, wrote an Historia ecclesiastica in thirteen books; it reaches to 1142, and is of especial value for the history of Normandy, England, and the Crusades. The Dominican Bartholomew of Lucca, called also Ptolemæus de Fiadonibus (died 1327), covered a longer period. His work in twenty-four books reaches to 1313, and was continued to 1361 by Henry of Diessenhofen. The Flores chronicorum seu Catalogus Pontificum Romanorum of Bernard Guidonis, Bishop of Lodève (died 1331), may be counted among the works on the general history of the Church. The most extensive, and relatively the best, historical work during this period is the Summa Historialis of St. Antoninus. It deals with secular and ecclesiastical history from the creation to 1457.

The national histories which appeared towards the end of the last period (of Cassiodorus, Jordanis, Gregory of Tours) were followed by similar works giving the history of other peoples. Venerable Bede wrote his admirable Historia ecclesiastica gentis Anglorum, which describes in five books the history of England from the Roman conquest to 731, though treating principally of events after Augustine of Canterbury's mission in 596. Paulus Warnefrid (Diaconus) wrote the history of his fellow-Lombards (Historia Langobardorum) from 568 to 733; it still remains the principal source for the history of his people. An unknown writer continued it to 774, and in the 9th century the monk Erchembert added the history of the Lombards of Beneventum to 889. Paulus wrote also a history of the bishops of Metz (Gesta episcoporum Mettensium, ad. in Mon. Germ. Hist: Script., II) and other historical works. The Scandinavian North found its ecclesiastical historian in Adam of Bremen; he covers the period between 788 and 1072, and his work is of special importance for the history of the Diocese of Hamburg-Bremen. Flodoard (died 966) wrote the history of the Archdiocese of Reims (Historia ecclesiæ Remensis) to 948, a very important source for the history of the Church of France to that time.

The ecclesiastical history of Northern Germany was described by Albert Crantz, a canon of Hamburg (died 1517), in his Metropolis or Historia de ecclesiis sub Carolo Magno in Saxoniâ instauratis (i. e. from 780 to 1504; Frankfort, 1576 and often reprinted). Among the special historical works of this period of the Western Church is the Liber Pontificalis, an important collection of papal biographies that take on larger proportions after the 4th century, are occasionally very lengthy in the 8th and 9th centuries, and through various continuations reach to the death of Pope Martin V in 1431. The German, Italian, French, and English chronicles, annals, and biographies of this epoch are very numerous.

=== The Church historians of the Third Period ===
With the 16th century a new epoch dawned for ecclesiastical history: historical criticism went hand in hand with the growth of humanist education. The sources of historical events were examined as to their authenticity.

The religious controversies that followed the rise of Protestantism were also an incentive to historical study. Printing made possible a rapid distribution of all kinds of writings, so that the sources of church history soon became known and studied in the widest circles, and new works on church history could be circulated in all directions.

==== From the middle of the 16th to the middle of the 17th century ====
The first large work on church history which appeared in this period was composed in the interests of Lutheranism. Mathias Flacius, called Illyricus (a native of Illyria), united with five other Lutherans (John Wigand, Mathias Judex, Basilius Faber, Andreas Corvinus, and Thomas Holzschuher), to produce an extensive work, that should exhibit the history of the Church as a convincing apology for strict Lutheranism. (See Centuriators of Magdeburg.) In the Centuriæ, a partisan work, the institutions of the Roman Church appear as works of Satan and darkness. It called forth Catholic refutations, particularly that of Cæsar Baronius. Urged by Philip Neri, he undertook in 1568 the task of producing an ecclesiastical history, which he brought down to the end of the 12th century and published under the title, Annales ecclesiastici (12 vols., Rome, 1588–1607). Numerous editions and continuations of it then appeared.

==== From the middle of the 17th to the end of the 18th century ====
Catholic Church historians

From the middle of the 17th century French writers were active in ecclesiastico-historical research. The writings of the Fathers of the Church and other ancient sources were published in better editions, and the auxiliary sciences of history were well cultivated. Antoine Godeau, Bishop of Vence, wrote a Histoire de l'église reaching to the 9th century (5 vols., Paris, 1655–78; several other editions appeared and the work was translated into Italian and German), and to the Oratorian Cabassut for Historia ecclesiastica (Lyons, 1685). Although the Jesuit Louis Maimbourg did not write a continuous ecclesiastical history, he published numerous treatises (Paris, 1673–83): on Arianism, Iconoclasm, the Greek Schism, struggle between the popes and the emperors, Western Schism, Lutheranism, and Calvinism.

Among the major ecclesiastical historians of this period are: Noël Alexandre (Natalis Alexander) a Dominican; Claude Fleury, who wrote a Histoire ecclésiastique in 20 volumes, reaching to 1414 (Paris, 1691–1720) as a moderate Gallican; and Louis-Sébastien Le Nain de Tillemont. To these must be added Bossuet, who, in his Discours sur l'histoire universelle (Paris, 1681), treated the history of the Church as far as Charlemagne. His Histoire des variations des églises protestantes (2 vols., Paris, 1688) describes the changes which the Waldenses, Albigenses, Wyclifites, and Hussites, as well as Luther and Calvin, made to the fundamental doctrines of the Catholic Church.

Their successors in the 18th century compare unfavourably with their predecessors, in criticism of their sources and in scientific accuracy. The following are noteworthy: François Timoléon de Choisy, Histoire de l'Église (11 vols., Paris, 1706–23); Bonaventure Racine (Jansenist), Abrégé de l'histoire ecclesiastique (13 vols., Cologne, properly Paris, 1762–7); Gabriel Ducreu, Les siècles chrétiens (9 vols., Paris, 1775; 2nd ad. in 10 vols., Paris, 1783). The widest circulation was attained by the Histoire de l'Église of Bérault-Bercastel.

Italy during this period was productive mainly, however, in Christian archæology and special departments of history. The names of Cardinals Noris, Bona, and Pallavicini, Archbishop Mansi of Lucca, the Vatican librarian Zacagni, Ferdinando Ughelli, Roncaglia, Bianchini, Muratori, the brothers Pietro and Girolamo Ballerini, Gallandi, and Zaccaria, indicate the extent of historical research carried on in Italy during the 18th century. Among the general histories of the Church is the Storia Ecclesiastica of the Dominican Giuseppe Agostino Orsi. A church history of similarly vast proportions was undertaken by the Oratorian Sacarelli. A third work, of an even more comprehensive nature and reaching to the beginning of the 18th century, was written by the French Dominican, Hyacinthe Graveson, resident in Italy, Historia ecclesiastica variis colloquiia digesta (12 vols., Rome, 1717-). Mansi continued it in two volumes to 1760. Compendia of general church history, widely read, were written by the Augustinian Lorenzo Berti (Breviarium historiæ ecclesiasticæ, Pisa and Turin, 1761–8), who also wrote three volumes of Dissertationes historicæ (Florence, 1753–6); Carlo Sigonio treated the first three centuries (2 vols., Milan, 1758), and Giuseppe Zola, treats the same period in his Commentarium de rebus ecclesiasticis (3 vols., Pavia, 1780-), and also wrote Prolegomena comment. de rebus eccl. (3 vols., Pavia, 1779).

In Spain, the Augustinian Enrique Flórez began at this period a monumental work on the ecclesiastical history of Spain, España sagrada, which at the death of the author in 1773 had reached its twenty-ninth volume. Manuel Risco continued it to the forty-second volume, and, since his death, it has been carried still nearer to completion, the fifty-first volume appearing in 1886. Some special works appeared in Germany, monographs of particular dioceses and monasteries, but general church history was not cultivated until Joseph II had executed his reform of theological studies. Among them are Lumper's Institutiones historiæ ecclesiasticæ (Vienna, 1790); the Institutiones historiæ eccl. of Dannenmeyer (2 vols., Vienna, 1788), relatively the best; the Synopsis histor. relig. et eccles. christ. of Royko (Prague, 1785); the Epitome hist. eccl. of Gmeiner (2 vols., Gratz, 1787–1803), and similar works by Wolf, Schmalzfuss, Stöger, Becker. The Netherlands produced compendia, e. g. those of Mutsaerts (2 vols., Antwerp, 1822), Rosweyde (2 vols., Antwerp, 1622), M. Chefneux (Eccl. Cathol. speculum chronographicum, 3 vols., Liège, 1666–70).

Protestant Church historians

It was some time after the publication of the Magdeburg Centuries (see above) before Protestant scholars again undertook extensive independent work in the province of church history. Their division into Reformed and Lutherans on the one hand, and the domestic feuds among the Lutherans on the other, were distractions. When Protestant scholarship again arose, the Reformed Churches took the lead and retained it into the 18th century. This was true not only in the domain of special history, in which they issued important publications (e. g. Bingham's Antiquitates ecclesiasticæ, 1722; the works of Grabe, Beveridge, Blondel, Daillé, Saumaise, Usher, Pearson, Dodwell, etc.), but also in that of general church history. Among these writers are: Johann Heinrich Hottinger, whose Historia ecclesiastica Novi Test. (9 vols., Hanover, 1655–67) is hostile to the Catholic Church; Jacques Basnage, the opponent of Bossuet (Histoire de l'Église depuis Jésus-Christ jusqu'à présent, Rotterdam, 1699); Antoine Basnage, the opponent of Baronius (Annales politico-eccles. 3 vols., Rotterdam, 1706), and Spanheim (Introductio ad hist. et antiquit. sacr., Leyden, 1687; Historia ecclesiastica, Leyden, 1701). The Reformed Churches produced moreover a number of manuals of church history, e. g. Turettini, Hist. eccles. compendium (Halle, 1750); Venema, Institut. histor. eccl. (5 vols., Leyden, 1777); Jablonski, Institut. hist. eccl. (2 vols., Frankfort, 1753). Similar Protestant manuals appeared in England, e. g. Milner, History of the Church of Christ (4 vols., London, 1794); Murray History of Religion (4 vols., London, 1794), and Priestley, History of the Christian Church.

Dring the 17th century, the Lutherans produced a Compendium histor. eccl. by Seckendorf and Bockler (Gotha, 1670–6). But a new era in Lutheran ecclesiastical historiography dates from Arnold's Unparteiische Kirchen- und Ketzerhistorie (2 vols., Frankfort am M., 1699). This pietist author is friendly to all the sects, but hostile to the Catholic Church and orthodox Lutheranism. Calmer is Eberhard Weissmann's Introductio in memorabilia ecclesiastica historiæ sacræ Novi Test. (2 vols., Tübingen, 1718). The Latin historical writings of Joh. Lor. Mosheim, particularly his De rebus christ. ante Constantinum Magnum (Helmstadt, 1753), and Institutiones histor. eccles. antiquioris et recentioris (Helmstadt, 1755), treat the Church as an institution of secular origin. His Institutiones were translated into German and continued by two of his pupils, J. von Einem and Rud. Schlegel (Leipzig, 1769-; Heilbronn, 1770-). Further progress was made in the works of Pfaff, chancellor of Tübingen (Institutiones histor. eccl., Tübingen, 1721), of Baumgarten (Auszug der Kirchengeschichte, 3 vols., Halle, 1743-), Pertsch (Versuch einer Kirchengeschichte, 5 vols, Leipzig, 1736-), Cotta (Versuch einer ausführlichen Kirchenhistorie des neuen Testamentes, 3 vols., Tübingen, 1768–73). Specialised works were written by the two Walchs-Joh. Georg Walch issuing Eine Geschichte der Reigionsstreitigkeiten innerhalb und ausserhalb der evangelisch-lutherischen Kirche in two parts, each comprising five volumes (Jena, 1733–9) while his son Christian Wilhelm published a lengthy ketzergeschichte, whose eleventh volume reaches to the Iconoclasts (Leipzig, 1762–85). The latter also wrote a Religionsgeschichte der neuesten Zeit, beginning with Clement XIV (to which Planck added three volumes), a Historie der Kirchenversammlungen (Leipzig, 1759), and a Historic der röm. Päpste (Göttingen, 1758).

The major Lutheran work on general church history is that of J. Mathias Schröckh, a pupil of Mosheim and a professor at Wittenberg: Christliche Kirchengeschichte bis zur Reformation in thirty-five volumes (Leipzig, 1768–1803), continued as Kirchengeschichte seit der Reformation in eight volumes (Leipzig, 1803–8), to which Tzschirmer added two others (1810–12). The whole work includes forty-five volumes and closes with the beginning of the 19th century. The works of Johannes Salomon Semler were his Historiæ eccles. selecta capita (3 vols., Halle 1767-), Versuch eines fruchtbaren Auszuges der kirchengeschichte (3 parts, Halle, 1778), and Versuch christlicher Jahrbücber (2 parts, Halle, 1782). Most of his contemporaries wrote church history as a chronicle of scandals (Scandalchronik): superstition, fanaticism, and human passion. This spirit is particularly characteristic of Spittler, Grundriss der Gesch. der christl. Kirche" and Henke, Allgem. Geschichte der chr. K.

==== The 19th century ====
Romanticism led to an appreciation of the Catholic medieval world, while in all departments of learning there appeared a desire to be objective in judgment. The sources of ecclesiastical history were studied via historical criticism.

=== Catholic ecclesiastical historians ===
It was in Catholic Germany that these changes were first noticeable, particularly in the work of the convert, Count Leopold von Stolberg. His Geschichte der Religion Jesu Christi was issued in fifteen volumes, the first four of which contain the history of the Old Testament and reach to 430. Similarly, the less important Geschichte der christlichen Kirche (9 vols., Ravensburg, 1824–34) by Locherer, rather uncritical and exhibiting the influence of Schröckh, remained unfinished, and reaches only to 1073. The excellent Geschichte der christlichen Kirche by J. Othmar von Rauschen is also incomplete. A useful compendium, serious and scientific in character, was begun by Hortig, professor at Landshut, the Handbuch der christlichen Kirchengeschichte. He completed two volumes (Landshut, 1821-), and reached the Reformation; a third volume, that brought the work down to the French revolution, was added by his successor Döllinger. This scholar, who later on abandoned the Catholic attitude and principles of his earlier days, excelled previous writers. Johann Adam Möhler wrote several special historical works and dissertations of exceptional merit. His lectures on general church history were published after his death by his pupil, the Benedictine Pius Gams (Kirchengeschichte, 3 vols., Ratisbon, 1867).

To these larger and epoch-making works must be added several compendia, some of which like Klein (Historia ecclesiastica, Gratz, 1827), Ruttenstock (Institutiones hist. eccl., 3 vols., Vienna, 1832–4), Cherrier (Instit. hist. eccl., 4 vols., Pestini, 1840-), were bare summaries of facts; others, like Ritter (Handbuch der Kirchengeschichte, 3 vols., Bonn, 1830; 6th ed. by Ennen, 1861), and Alzog (Universalgeschichte der christlichen Kirche, Mains, 1840; 10th ed. by F. X. Kraus, 1882), are lengthy narratives, critical and thorough. Particular periods or epochs of ecclesiastical history soon found careful cultivation, e. g. by Riffel, Kirchengeschichte der neuen und neuesten Zeit, vom Anfang der Glaubensspaltung im 16. Jahrhundert (3 vols., Mainz, 1841–6); Joseph Ferdinand Damberger, Synchronistische Geschichte der Kirche und der Welt im Mittelalter (in 15 volumes, Ratisbon, 1850–63; the last volume edited by Rattinger), which reaches to 1378. Karl Joseph Hefele is the third of the great German Catholic historians; his valuable Konziliengeschichte is really a comprehensive work on general church history. The first seven volumes of the work (Freiburg, 1855–74) reach to 1448. A new edition was begun by the author (Freiburg, 1873-); it was carried on by Knöpfler (vole. V-VII), while Hergenröther (later cardinal) undertook to continue the work and published two more volumes (VIII-IX, 1887–90); which carry the history of the Councils to the opening of the Council of Trent. Hergenröther is the fourth great church historian of Catholic Germany. His Handbuch der allgemeinen Kirchengeschichte (3 vols., Freiburg im B., 1876–80; 3rd ed., 1884–6; 4th ed., revised by J. P. Kirsch, 1902 sqq.) exhibits vast erudition and won recognition, even from Protestants as the most independent and instructive Catholic Church history.

In recent years smaller, but scholarly compendia have been written by Brück, Krause Funk, Knöpfler, Marx, and Weiss. Numerous periodicals of a scientific nature bear evidence to the vigorous activity at present displayed in the field of ecclesiastical history, e. g. the Kirchengeschichtliche Studien (Münster), the Quellen und Forschungen aus dem Gebiet der Geschichte (Paderborn), the Forschungen zur christlichen Literatur- und Dogmengeschichte (Mainz and Paderborn), the Veröffentlichungen aus dem kirchenhistorischen Seminar München.

==== France ====
In France the study of church history was long in attaining the high standard it reached in the 17th century. Two extensive narratives of general church history appeared. That of René François Rohrbacher is the better, Histoire Universelle de l'Église Catholique (Nancy, 1842–9). It exhibits little independent research, but is a diligently executed work, and the author made a generous and skilful use of the best and most recent literature (new ed. with continuation by Guillaume, Paris, 1877). The second work is by Darras (q. v.). In recent years the science of ecclesiastical history has made great progress in France, both as to genuine criticism and thorough scholarly narrative. The critical tendency, aroused and sustained principally by Louis Duchesne, continues to flourish and inspires very important works, particularly in special ecclesiastical history. Among the writings of Duchesne the Histoire ancienne de l'Église (2 vols., already issued, Paris, 1906-) deserves particular mention. Another important publication is the Bibliothèque de l'enseignement de l'histoire ecclésiastique, a series of monographs by different authors, of which fourteen volumes have so far appeared (Paris, 1896-), and some have gone through several editions. A very useful manual is Marion's Histoire de l'Église (Paris, 1906).

==== Belgium ====
The Bollandist de Smedt wrote an Introductio generalis in Historiam ecclesiasticam critice tractandam (Louvain, 1876). A manual of church history was published by Wouters (Compendium hist. eccl., 3 vols., Louvain, 1874), who also wrote Dissertationes in selecta capita hist. eccl. (6 vols. Louvain, 1868–72). Josef Andreas Jungmann dealt with general church history to the end of the 18th century in his Dissertationes selectæ in historiam ecclesiasticam. The character of ecclesiastico-historical studies at Louvain is seen in the Revue d'Histoire Ecclésiastique edited by Cauchie and Ladeuze.

==== Italy ====
Some manuals appeared in Italy in church history, e. g. Delsignore, Institutiones histor. eccles., edited by Tissani (4 vols., Rome, 1837–46); Palma, Prælectiones hist. eccl. (4 vols., Rome, 1838–46); Prezziner, Storia della Chiesa (9 vols., Florence, 1822-); Ign. Mozzoni, Prolegomena alla storia universale della chiesa (Florence, 1861), and Tavole chronologiche critiche della storia universale della chiesa (Venice 1856-). Balan published as a continuation of Rohrbacher's universal ecclesiastical history the Storia della chiesa dall' anno 1846 sino ai giorni nostri (3 vols., Turin, 1886). Special works of great value were produced in various departments, above all by Giovanni Battista de Rossi in Christian archæology. However, certain recent works on general church history—e. g. Amelli, Storia della chiesa (2 vols., Milan, 1877); Taglialatelá, Lezioni di storia eccles. e di archeologia cristiana (4 vols., Naples, 1897); Pighi, Inst. hist. eccl., I (Verona, 1901)—do not come up to the present standard, at any rate, from the standpoint of methodical and critical treatment.

==== Spain ====
The ecclesiastical history of Spain inspired two major works, one by Villanueva (Viage literario a las iglesias de España, Madrid, 1803–21; 1850–2), the other by de la Fuente (Historia ecclesiastica de España, 2nd ed., 2 vols., Madrid, 1873–5). In the field of general history, only Amat's Historia ecclesiastica o tratado de la Iglesia de Jesu Christo (12 vols., Madrid, 1793–1803, 2nd ed. 1807) appeared—not a very thorough work. Juan Manuel de Berriozobal wrote Historia de la Iglesia en sus primos siglos (4 vols., Madrid, 1867). The Dominican Francisco Rivaz y Madrazo published a manual (Curso de historia ecclesiastica, 3 vols., 3rd ed., Madrid, 1905).

==== Netherlands ====
The first scientific Catholic manual of church history in Dutch was written by Albers (Handboek der algemeene Kerkgeschiedenis, 2 vols., Nijmegen, 1905–7; 2nd ed., 1908).

==== England ====
Special ecclesiastical history can point to a multitude of English works.

==== Scotland ====
A brief Catholic general account of the history of the Church in Scotland is that of T. Walsh, History of the Catholic Church in Scotland (1876). That of Alphons Bellesheim has a full bibliography, translated into English by Hunter-Blair, History of the Catholic Church in Scotland (4 vols., London, 1887, sqq.). A non-Catholic work is Calderwood's History of the Kirk (8 vols., Edinburgh, 1842).

==== Ireland ====
The first major Catholic work on the general ecclesiastical history of Ireland was that of Lanigan, Ecclesiastical History of Ireland (4 vols., 2nd ed., Dublin, 1829), reaching only to the beginning of the 13th century. A single volume work is that of the Franciscan Michael John Brenan, Ecclesiastical History of Ireland (2nd edition, Dublin, 1864).

==== United States ====
A learned documentary work is that of John Gilmary Shea, History of the Catholic Church in the United States (4 vols., New York, 1886). O'Gorman's, A History of the Roman Catholic Church in the United States (New York, 1895), contains a useful bibliography.

==== Australia ====
For Australia see Cardinal Moran's History of the Catholic Church in Australasia (Sydney, 1896).

=== Protestant Church historians ===
Among Protestants, Church history was cultivated chiefly by German Lutherans; their works came to be authoritative among non-Catholics.

Another Protestant school is more in sympathy with Semler's views. Its first leaders were the so-called "Neo-Tübingen School" under Johann Christian Baur, whose ecclesiastico-historical writings are directly anti-Christian: Das Christentum und die Kirche der drei ersten Jahrhunderte (Tübingen, 1853); Die christliche Kirche vom 4. bis zum 6. Jahrhundert (Tübingen, 1859); Die christliche Kirche des Mittelalters (Tübingen, 1860); Die neuere Zeit (Tübingen, 1861–3); Das neunzehnte Jahrhundert (Tübingen, 1863–73). Baur himself and his rationalistic adherents, Schwegler, Ritsçhl, Rothe, wrote also special works on the origins of the Church. The Allgemeine Kirchengeschichte of Gfrörer (7 parts, Stuttgart, 1841), written prior to his conversion, is a product of this spirit. Though constantly attacked, this school, whose chief representative was Adolf Harnack, predominated in German Protestantism. Möller, in his Lehrbuch der Kirchengeschichte writes with moderation; similarly Müller in his Kirchengeschichte (Tübingen, 1892, sqq.).

In the 19th century also the Reformed (see above) produced less in the province of general church history than the Lutherans.

An important general ecclesiastical history produced by Anglican scholars was edited by W. Stephens and W. Hunt—A History of the English Church by various writers (Hunt, Stephens, Capes, Gairdner, Hutton, Overton).

=== Greek Orthodox writers ===
Greek Orthodox writers produced two works of general Church history: the Historia Ekklesiastike by Diomedes Kyriakus (2 vols., Athens, 1882), and the Ekklesiastike historia apo Iesou Christou mechri ton kath hemas chronon by Philaretes Bapheides (Constantinople, 1884–).

== See also ==
- History of the Catholic Church
- History according to the Catholic Church
- Timeline of the Catholic Church
