= John Tracy Ellis =

American Catholic priest and historian (1905–1992)

The Reverend Monsignor Dr John Tracy Ellis
- Born: July 30, 1905; Seneca, Illinois, US
- Died: October 16, 1992 (aged 87)
- Known for: Catholic Church historian

John Tracy Ellis (July 30, 1905 – October 16, 1992) was an American Catholic Church historian and priest.

Ellis was born and raised in Seneca, Illinois. Soon after he was ordained, he received a doctorate in history from Catholic University of America in Washington, where he researched with Peter Guilday to collect central documents of the American Catholic heritage.

He spent most of his career as a faculty member at Catholic University, but he also taught at the University of San Francisco between 1963 and 1976. He was a long serving executive secretary of the American Catholic Historical Association and editor of the Catholic Historical Review (1941–62). Ellis is well known for his 1952 argument that American Catholic scholars failed to measure up to European Catholic standards of scholarship and intellectual leadership.

== Career ==
He wrote widely on church history, including a major biography of James Cardinal Gibbons. He attracted widespread attention in Catholic circles for his essay (1955) deploring an anti-intellectual "ghetto mentality" among American Catholics.

In his book American Catholicism, first published in 1956, he wrote that a "universal anti-Catholic bias was brought to Jamestown in 1607 and vigorously cultivated in all the thirteen colonies from Massachusetts to Georgia."

In 1969, he was honored with a one year term as the president of the American Society of Church History.

In 1978, Ellis received what is regarded as the highest honor for US Catholics, the University of Notre Dame's Laetare Medal.

== Legacy ==
Several of Ellis's students at Catholic University went on to make contributions to church history, including Archbishop Oscar Hugh Lipscomb and Msgr. Francis J. Weber.

He was made a domestic prelate with the title monsignor by Pope Pius XII in 1955. In 1989, Pope John Paul II further elevated him to Protonotary Apostolic, the highest rank for a monsignor. He is interred in Mt. Calvary Cemetery on the north side of Seneca.

== Published works (selection) ==
- Cardinal Consalvi and Anglo-Papal Relations, 1814-1825. Washington, DC: Catholic University of America Press, 1942.
- The Formative Years of the Catholic University of America. Washington, DC: Catholic University of America Press, 1946
- The Life of James Cardinal Gibbons, Archbishop of Baltimore. Milwaukee, WI: Bruce Pub. Co., 1952.
- Catholic Bishops: A Memoir. Wilmington, Delaware: Michael Glazier, 1983.
- A Commitment to Truth. Latrobe, PA: The Archabbey Press, 1966.
- "American Catholics and the Intellectual Life." Thought. 30 (1955), 351-88.
- Faith and Learning: A Church Historian's Story. Lanham, MD: University Press of America, 1989.
- American Catholicism. Chicago, IL: The University of Chicago Press, 1956.
- The Formative Years of the Catholic University of America. Washington, DC: Murray & Heister.

== See also ==
- Land O'Lakes Statement, on removing colleges from Church control

== Works cited and further reading ==
- Gollar, C. Walker. "The Historical Methodology of John Tracy Ellis." The Catholic historical review (2011): 46-75. online
- Minnich, Nelson H., Robert B. Eno, S.S., and Robert F. Trisco. Studies in Catholic History in Honor of John Tracy Ellis. Wilmington, Delaware: Michael Glazier, 1985.
- Shelley, Thomas J. John Tracy Ellis: An American Catholic Reformer (The Catholic University of America, 2023), the main biography excerpt.
- Shelley, Thomas J. "The Young John Tracy Ellis and American Catholic Intellectual Life." U.S. Catholic Historian. 13:1 (Winter 1995), 1-18
- Shelley, Thomas J. "Ellis, John Tracy (1905-1992)" in Michael Glazier, ed. The Modern Catholic Encyclopedia (1994) pp 277–78
- Shelley, Thomas J. "Not Whispering in the Footnotes: John Tracy Ellis and American Catholic History." American Catholic Studies (2004): 1-22. online
- Thomas, J. Douglas. "American Catholic Interpretations of Church and State: John Gilmary Shea, Peter Guilday, Thomas T. McAvoy, and John Tracy Ellis." Journal of Church and State 27 (1985): 267-283..
  - Thomas, Jack Douglas. "Interpretations of American Catholic Church History: A Comparative Analysis of Representative Catholic Historians, 1875-1975." Ph. D. Diss.: Baylor University, 1976. Treats Ellis's work, in addition to historians John Gilmary Shea, Peter Guilday, Theodore Maynard, and Thomas McAvoy.
- Ronny Baier (2003). "John Tracy Ellis". In Bautz, Traugott (ed.). Biographisch-Bibliographisches Kirchenlexikon (BBKL) (in German). Vol. 21. Nordhausen: Bautz. cols. 352–358. ISBN 3-88309-110-3.
