= Halkin =

Halkin may refer to:

- The namesake of the Baronetcy of Halkin
- Halkin (surname)
- Belarusian and Ukrainian equivalents of the Russian surname Galkin
- The Halkin, hotel in London, England, UK
- Halkin Castle, or, Halkyn Castle; in Flintshire, Wales, UK

== See also ==
- Halkyn, Flintshire, Wales, UK
