= Dollinger =

Dollinger and Döllinger are surnames of German origin. They may refer to:

- Genora Johnson Dollinger (1913–1995), American labor organizer;
- Günther Dollinger (born 1960), German physicist and professor;
- Ignaz Döllinger (1770–1841), German physician and university professor;
- Ignaz von Döllinger (1799–1890), German theologian;
- Isidore Dollinger (1903–2000), American politician;
- Marc Dollinger (born 1964), American professor and writer;
- Marie Dollinger (1910–1994), German track and field athlete;
- Matthias Dollinger (born 1979), Austrian footballer;
- Philippe Dollinger (1904–1999), French historian;
- Richard A. Dollinger (born 1951), New York politician and judge;
- Werner Dollinger (1918–2008), German politician.

== See also ==
- Drollinger
- Klaus Doldinger, a German saxophonist
