= Léopold Willaert =

Belgian historian (1878–1963)

- Born: Léopold Adolphe Joseph Marie Willaert; 19 March 1878; Bruges, Belgium
- Died: 31 October 1963 (aged 85); Namur, Belgium

Academic background
- Education: Collège Saint-Servais (Liège); Stonyhurst College
- Alma mater: Catholic University of Leuven
- Thesis: Les négociations politico-religieuses entre l'Angleterre et les Pays-Bas catholiques, 1598-1625 (1905)
- Doctoral advisor: Alfred Cauchie

Academic work
- Discipline: History
- Sub-discipline: Church history
- Institutions: University of Namur

Léopold Willaert (19 March 1878 – 31 October 1963) was a Belgian Jesuit Church historian with a particular interest in the history of Jansenism.

== Life ==
Willaert was born in Bruges on 19 March 1878. He joined the Society of Jesus immediately after finishing his secondary education at the Collège Saint-Servais (Liège), and for three years studied philosophy at Stonyhurst College. His doctorate in history, supervised by Alfred Cauchie, was completed at the Catholic University of Leuven in 1905. He then briefly taught at St Michael College, Brussels, before commencing theology studies in Leuven. He took his final vows as a Jesuit in 1912, and from 1913 to 1956 taught at what is now the University of Namur. In 1945 he became president of the board of the Royal Library of Belgium. Willaert died in Namur on 31 October 1963.

== Publications ==
- Negociations politico-religieuses entre l'Angleterre et les pays-bas Catholiques (1598-1625) (Leuven, 1906)
- Le Moyen Age (Namur, 1927)
- Histoire de Belgique (Tournai, 1929)
- with Henri Josson, eds, Correspondance de Ferdinand Verbiest de la Compagnie de Jésus (1623-1688): directeur de l'observatoire de Pékin (Brussels, 1938)
- Religion et patriotisme (Tournai, 1947)
- Les origines du Jansénisme dans les Pays-Bas catholiques (Gembloux, 1948)
- Bibliotheca Janseniana Belgica: répertoire des imprimés concernant les controverses théologiques en relation avec le Jansénisme dans les Pays-Bas catholiques et les pays de Liège aux XVIIe et XVIIIe siècles (3 vols, Leuven, 1949–1951)
- Après le Concile de Trente: La Restauration catholique, 1563-1648 (1960)
