= Alfred Cauchie =

Belgian professor of history

- Born: Alfred Henri Joseph Cauchie; October 26, 1860; Haulchin, Hainaut, Belgium
- Died: February 10, 1922 (aged 61); Rome, Italy

Academic background
- Education: Bonne-Espérance Seminary
- Alma mater: Catholic University of Leuven
- Thesis: La querelle des investitures dans les diocèses de Liège et de Cambrai (1890)
- Doctoral advisor: Charles Moeller

Academic work
- Discipline: Historian
- Sub-discipline: Archival science; Ecclesiastical history
- Institutions: Catholic University of Leuven; Belgian Historical Institute in Rome
- Doctoral students: Leon van der Essen, Peter Guilday, Léopold Willaert

Alfred Cauchie (October 26, 1860 – February 10, 1922) was a professor of history at the Catholic University of Leuven.

== Life ==
Cauchie was born in Haulchin, Hainaut, on 26 October 1860, and was educated at the minor seminary of Bonne-Espérance in Estinnes. In 1882 he entered the major seminary, receiving priestly ordination from Isidore-Joseph du Rousseaux, bishop of Tournai, on 25 October 1885. After ordination he was sent to the Catholic University of Leuven to pursue studies in History, graduating licentiate in 1888. His bishop then sent him to Rome in 1888-1889, where he worked in the Vatican Secret Archives, which had been opened to researchers by Pope Leo XIII in 1879. He took a particular interest in documents relating to Belgian history.

In 1890 Cauchie submitted a doctoral thesis on La querelle des investitures dans les diocèses de Liège et de Cambrai (the investiture controversy in the dioceses of Liège and Cambrai), which was printed in two volumes by Peeters. Charles Moeller then took him on as his teaching assistant for the seminars in historical method at the Faculty of Arts, and in 1892 Désiré-Joseph Mercier invited him to teach a course on heuristics and historical criticism at the recently founded Institute of Philosophy. The following year he was appointed to lecture on medieval institutions in the Faculty of Arts, and in 1895 he replaced the deceased Canon Bernard Jungmann, teaching Church History in the Faculties of Theology and Canon Law.

In 1900 he founded the Revue d'Histoire Ecclésiastique, a leading journal in the field of ecclesiastical history.

In 1892 he published a report to the Ministry of Education calling for systematic searches of Italian archives for documents relating to Belgian history. This was the first step towards the founding of the Belgian Historical Institute in Rome a decade later. To Cauchie's chagrin, the first director to be appointed was Ursmer Berlière rather than himself. It was only in 1919 that Cauchie fulfilled his ambition of being appointed director, the same year that he was elected to the Académie royale de Belgique. He took up the post the following year, and died in Rome on 10 February 1922.

At the time of his death, Cauchie was chair of an interdiocesan commission investigating the extent of harm suffered by the Catholic Church in Belgium during the First World War. After his death the commission was disbanded, its work uncompleted.

== Works ==
Due to a heavy load of teaching and administration, Cauchie published relatively little beyond short articles about archival finds and teaching methods. His work was also impeded by the destruction of Leuven University Library in the German invasion of 1914 (during which he was himself briefly a displaced person).

Together with René Maere he edited Recueil des instructions générales aux nonces de Flandre (1596-1635) (Brussels, 1904); he also contributed entries to the Biographie Nationale de Belgique on Poppo of Stavelot (in volume 18), Richard of Saint-Vanne (vol. 19) and Rupert of Deutz (vol. 20).

Other works include:

- La Grande Procession de Tournai (Leuven, 1892).
- Godefroid Kurth (1847-1916), le patriote, le chrétien, l'historien (Brussels, 1922)

== Biographies ==
- Leon van der Essen, "Alfred Cauchie (1860- 1022). L'initiateur, le savant, l'homme", Revue d'histoire ecclésiastique, 18 (1922), pp. 213–239.
- Ursmer Berlière, "Notice sur la vie et les travaux du chanoine Alfred Cauchie", Annuaire de l'Académie royale des Sciences, des Lettres et des Beaux-Arts de Belgique, 91 (1925), pp. 109–251
- Leon van der Essen, "Alfred Cauchie", La Commission royale d'Histoire (1834-1934). Livre jubilaire composé à l'occasion du centième anniversaire de sa fondation par les Membres de la Commission (Brussels, 1934), pp. 257–264.
