= Charles Terlinden =

Belgian historian, professor, and papal chamberlain

Prof. Dr. Charles Terlinden NPB
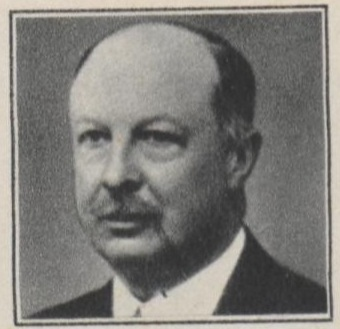
- Born: 6 July 1878; Schaerbeek, Belgium
- Died: 23 January 1972 (aged 93); Brussels, Belgium
- Years active: 1900–1972
- Title: Viscount

Academic background
- Education: Catholic University of Louvain
- Thesis: Le pape Clément IX et la guerre de Candie (1667-1669) d'après les archives secrètes du Saint-Siège (1904)
- Doctoral advisor: Alfred Cauchie

Academic work
- Discipline: Historian
- Sub-discipline: History of Belgium
- Institutions: Catholic University of Louvain
- Notable works: The History of the Scheldt (1920)

Charles Terlinden (1878–1972) was a Belgian historian, professor at the Catholic University of Louvain, and papal chamberlain.

== Life ==
Terlinden was born in Schaerbeek on 6 July 1878. He studied law at Saint-Louis University Faculty in Brussels, and at the Faculty of Law of the Catholic University of Louvain. After completing a doctorate in law, he began historical studies under Alfred Cauchie, with a thesis on Pope Clement IX and the War of Candia (1904). He followed this in 1906 with a second thesis on William I of the Netherlands and the Catholic Church in Belgium, making him a triple doctor.

He was called up in 1914 and saw action at Melle. After the war he was a historical adviser to the Belgian delegation to the Paris Peace Conference, and in the aftermath was vocally critical of the way that Austria-Hungary had been dismembered.

From 1918 until his death he was Professor of Modern and Contemporary History at the Catholic University of Louvain (emeritus from 1948). During the Second World War he wrote a number of popularising works about strong women in Belgian history. From 1955 until his death he was president of the Belgian Historical Institute in Rome. He died in Brussels on 23 January 1972. Obituaries were published in the Revue belge de philologie et d'histoire (50, 1972, pp. 1061–1069), Revue belge d'histoire militaire (19, 1972, pp. 361–362), Bulletin de l'Institut historique belge de Rome (43, 1973, pp. V-XI), and Bulletin de la Commission royale d'Histoire (150, 1984, pp. 75–78).

== Works ==
- The History of the Scheldt, London, 1920
- Histoire de la Belgique contemporaine, 2 vols., Brussels, 1929
- Histoire militaire des Belges, Brussels, 1931
- A travers notre histoire et nos gloires, Brussels, 1943
- L'Archiduchesse Isabelle, Brussels, 1943
- Princesses belges du passé, Brussels, 1943
- Figures de princesses, Brussels, 1944
- La Renaissance en Belgique, Brussels, 1945
- Impérialisme et équilibre, Brussels, 1952
- Carolus Quintus: Charles Quint, empereur des Deux Mondes, [Bruges], 1965
