= Léon-Ernest Halkin =

Belgian historian (1906–1998)

Léon-Ernest Halkin

Léon-Ernest Emmanuel Marie Joseph Halkin (1906–1998) was a Belgian historian, a supporter of the Walloon Movement, and a member of the Resistance during World War II.

== Life ==
Léon-Ernest Halkin was born in Liège on 11 May 1906, the son of the classicist Léon Halkin and Elvire Courtoy. He was raised in an academic milieu, with both his father and his uncle Joseph Halkin professors at University of Liège, and was educated under the Jesuits at the Collège Saint-Servais. He matriculated at the university in 1923. In 1928 he won a travel bursary, using it to spend a year in Paris, where he followed the classes of Robert Génestal at the École pratique des hautes études, Henri Hauser at the École normale supérieure, and Lucien Febvre at the Collège de France. His doctoral thesis on the 16th-century Prince-Bishop of Liège Érard de La Marck, supervised by Karl Hanquet, was published in 1930.

On 9 April 1931 he married Denise Daude (1907–1993), with whom he had six children: Marguerite, Marie-Jeanne, Hubert, Françoise, Pierre and Vincent. He taught at the University of Liège, where he became a full professor in 1943. From 1939 to 1975 he taught the undergraduate introduction to historical method. The main subjects of his research were the history of the principality of Liège and of the Protestant Reformation. He attacked Henri Pirenne's vision of Belgian history as effacing the distinctiveness of the principality of Liège, and himself adhered to the Walloon movement.

After the German invasion of 1940, his colleague Marie Delcourt got him involved in Resistance activities. He set up the underground newspaper Ici, la Belgique libre!, joined the Front de l'Indépendance, and led the Réseau Socrate, as well as hiding a Jewish girl in his own home. Betrayed by a former student, he was arrested by the Gestapo on 17 November 1943. The girl he had been hiding was sheltered by his colleague (and professional rival) Paul Harsin. Halkin was tortured, imprisoned at Fort Breendonk, and then deported to Mittelbau-Dora concentration camp. He was liberated from Boelcke-Kaserne concentration camp in 1945. He became one of the first Belgian members of the peace movement Pax Christi.

Halkin became an associate member of the Commission royale d'Histoire on 6 October 1947, and a full member on 15 September 1956. From 1950 to 1968 he was the president of the Comité belge d'histoire ecclésiastique, which he had co-founded, and from 1965 to 1970 co-director of the Centre interuniversitaire d'histoire de l'humanisme. In 1969 he set up an institute of Renaissance and Reformation history in Liège. From 1972 to 1986 he was director of the Belgian Historical Institute in Rome. After being widowed in 1993, he remarried with a former student, Louise-Angèle Williot, who had worked as his secretary from 1948 to 1975. Halkin died in Liège on 29 December 1998.

== Honorary doctorates ==
- University of Strasbourg (1972)
- University of Montpellier (1974)
- Brussels Faculty for Protestant Theology (1984)

== Works ==
Books

- Réforme protestante et réforme catholique au diocèse de Liège: Le cardinal de La Marck, prince-évêque de Liège, 1505-1538 (1930)
- with Georges Dansaert, Charles de Lannoy, vice-roi de Naples (1934)
- Introduction à l'histoire paroissiale de l'ancien diocèse de Liège (1935)
- À l'ombre de la mort (1947), with a preface by François Mauriac
- with Denise van Derveeghde, Les sources de l'histoire de la Belgique aux Archives et à la Bibliothèque vaticanes: état des collections et répertoire bibliographique (1951)
- Initiation à la critique historique, with a preface by Lucien Febvre (1951)
- La Réforme en Belgique sous Charles-Quint (1957)
- Eléments de critique historique (1960)
- Les archives des nonciatures (1968)
- Érasme et l'humanisme chrétien (1969)
- Les colloques d'Érasme (1971)
- Érasme (1987)
- Érasme et la troisième voie (1992)

Articles in the Bulletin de la Commission royale d'Histoire

- "Un pouillé du concile de Tongres en 1700", 115 (1950), pp. 57–84.
- with F. Lemaire, "Un procès d'anabaptistes à Limbourg en 1536", 121 (1956), pp. 1–24.
- "Émile Fairon (1875-1945)", 125 (1959), pp. 160–167.
- "Édouard de Moreau (1879-1952)", 125 (1959), pp. 168–179.
- "L'édit liégeois de 1526", 125 (1959), pp. 405–430.
- with G. Moreau, "Le procès de Paul Chevalier à Lille et à Tournai en 1564", 131 (1965), pp. 1–74.
- "Le journal d'André Strengnart, évêque auxiliaire de Liège (1586-1599)", 150 (1984), pp. 177–225.
