= Arlinghaus =

Arlinghaus is a surname. Notable people with the surname include:

- Francis A. Arlinghaus (1905–1993), American historian
- Sandra Arlinghaus (fl. 1994), American mathematician and geographer
