= Halfin =

Halfin is a surname. Notable people with the surname include:

- Ross Halfin (born 1957), British rock and roll photographer
- Eliezer Halfin (1948–1972), Israeli wrestler who died in the Munich massacre

== See also ==
- Halkin (surname)
