= Guilday =

Guilday is a surname. Notable people with the surname include:

- Peter Guilday (born 1884), American Catholic priest
- Rory Guilday (born 2002), American ice hockey player
