= Observantism =

Observantism (also called the observant movement or observant reform) was a reform movement affecting most of the religious orders of the Latin Church. It lasted from the mid-14th until the early-to-mid 16th century. Observants sought to restore the strict observance of rules (observantia regulae in Latin) as it was assumed to have been at the orders' foundings.

Observantism was a response to perceived decline and decadence in the orders. This decline is perceptible to historians in many ways. The overall number of Benedictine monasteries declined in the 14th century. The number of monks and nuns at many also declined. The Abbey of Cluny was reduced from 120 to 60 monks. Faced with a decline in vocations, the mendicant orders began to accept oblates. Contributing factors in the disruption of the religious orders were the Black Death (1346–1353) and the Great Western Schism (1378–1417).

Calls for reform were not new. The observant movement is distinguished from earlier reforms by its general appeal across most religious orders and its lack of singular leadership. It was not imposed on the orders, as, for example, the reforms legislated by Pope Benedict XII in 1335–1339. The chief concerns of the observants were the elimination of dispensations, which had proliferated, and a return to communal, cloistered living; religious should not hold offices that required dispensations and should not have independent sources of revenue.

Among orders with major observant movements were the Augustinian canons, Augustinian hermits, Benedictines, Carmelites, Dominicans and Franciscans.

== Works cited ==
- Minnich, Nelson H. (2005) [1996]. "Observantism". In Hans J. Hillebrand (ed.). Oxford Encyclopedia of the Reformation. Oxford University Press.
- Mixson, James (2015). "Introduction". In James Mixson; Bert Roest (eds.). A Companion to Observant Reform in the Late Middle Ages and Beyond. Brill. pp. 1–20.
- Oakley, Francis (1979). The Western Church in the Later Middle Ages. Cornell University Press.
- Roest, Bert (2009). "Observant Reform in Religious Orders". In Miri Rubin; Walter Simons (eds.). The Cambridge History of Christianity. Vol. 4: Christianity in Western Europe, c.1100–c.1500. Cambridge University Press. pp. 446–457.
- Roest, Bert (2023). "Observant Reforms and Cultural Production in Europe: Introductory Remarks". In Pietro Delcorno; Bert Roest (eds.). Observant Reforms and Cultural Production in Europe: Learning, Liturgy and Spiritual Practice (PDF). Radboud University Press. pp. 7–31.
- Zermatten, Coralie (2020). "The Carmelite Rule". In Krijn Pansters (ed.). A Companion to Medieval Rules and Customaries. Brill. pp. 367–392.
