= Stanislas Bormans =

Belgian archivist and historian

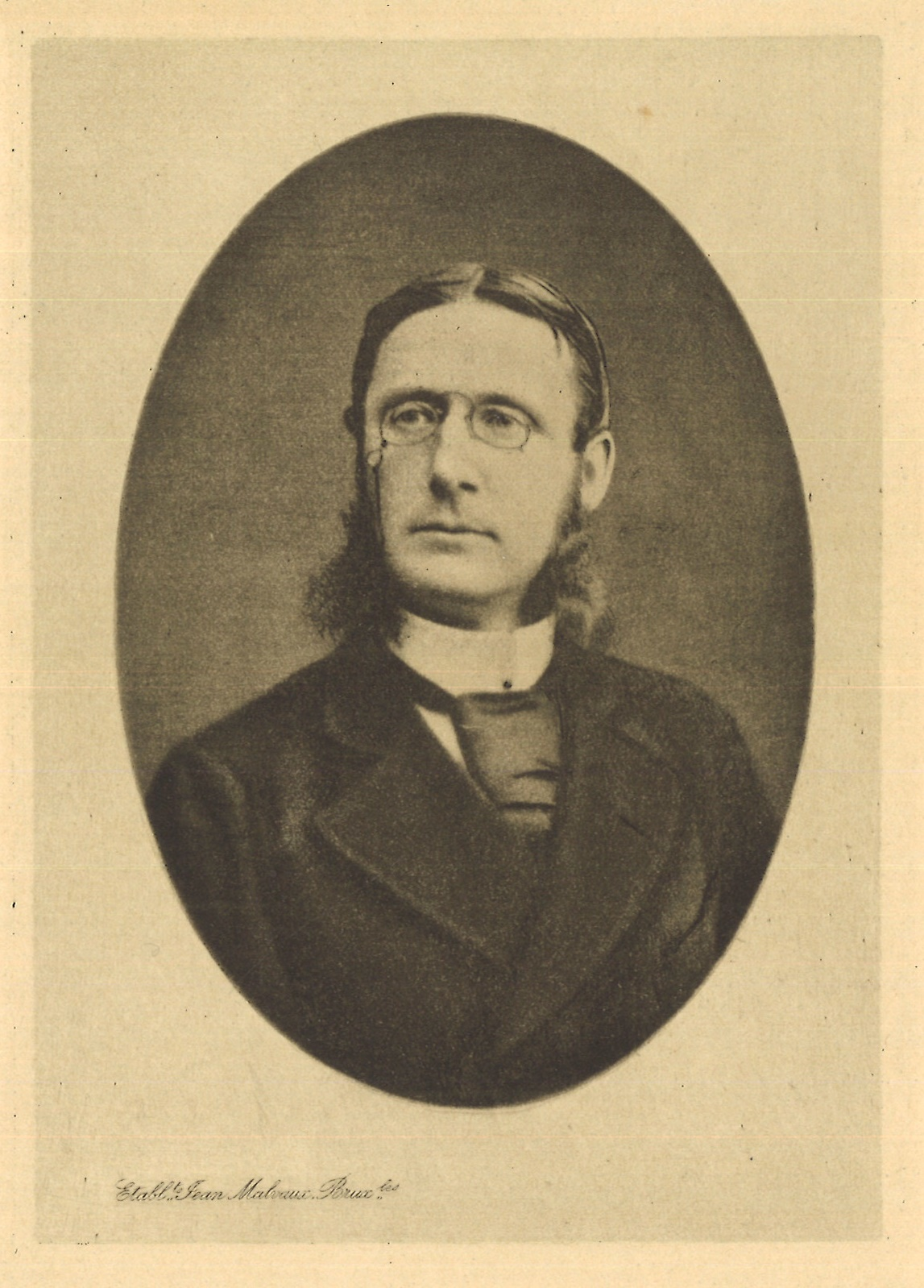
Stanislas Bormans

Stanislas Marie Bormans (1835–1912) was a Belgian archivist and historian.

== Life ==
Bormans was born in Hasselt on 2 February 1835. When he was a few months old, his father, Jean-Henri Bormans, was appointed a professor at the University of Ghent. Two years later he transferred to the University of Liège.

Stanislas graduated Doctor of Philosophy in July 1857 and was appointed assistant curator of the State Archives in Liège. In 1864 he married Victoire Francotte, daughter of a family in Liège. In 1873 he became curator of the State Archives in Namur, but in 1882 he returned to his former position of assistant curator in Liège so that his wife, whose health was poor, could be near her parents. In 1884 he became chief curator of the archives in Liège, but in 1885 he was appointed to the University of Liège, where he remained until his retirement in 1905. He taught palaeography from 1886, and from 1890 to 1896 was Professor of the History of Medieval and Modern Institutions, a position that he was glad to resign.

After being widowed in 1886, he remarried the following year with Anne 'tKint de Roodenbeke, who bore him four children.

He was a co-founder of the Société des Bibliophiles liégeois and served as secretary, vice-president and president of the Institut archéologique liégeois. He was also on the editorial committee of the Biographie Nationale de Belgique.

He died in Liège on 15 November 1912.

== Publications ==
- Le bon métier des tanneurs de l'ancienne cité de Liége (Liége, Carmanne, 1863) On Google Books
- Chronique des évêques de Liége: XIIIe siècle (Liège, L. Grandmont-Donders, 1864) On Google Books
- Vocabulaire des houilleurs liégeois (Liège, Carmanne, 1864)
- Chambre des finances des Princes de Liége: table des registres aux octrois, rendages, engagères (Liège, L. Grandmont-Donders, 1865) On Google Books
- Le bon métier des drapiers de l'ancienne cité de Liége (Liège, J.-G. Carmanne, 1866) On Google Books
- Les seigneuries allodiales du pays de Liége (Liège, Gothier, 1867) On Google Books
- Louis Abry, Les hommes illustres de la nation liégeoise, edited by Stanislas Bormans and Henri Helbig (Liège, Grandmont-Donders, 1867) On Google Books
- Ernest de Rye, Traicté des maisons nobles du pays de Liège, edited by Stanislas Bormans and Eugène Poswick (Liège, Grandmont-Donders, 1870) On Google Books
- Jean Joseph Raikem, Mathieu-Lambert Polain and Stanislas Bormans, eds., Coutumes du pays de Liège, vol. 2 (Brussels, Gobbaerts, 1884) On Google Books
- Les fiefs du comté de Namur (3 volumes, Namur, Wesmael-Charlier, 1875-1879) On Google Books
- Cartulaire de la commune de Couvin (Namur, Wesmael-Charlier, 1875)
- Recueil des ordonnances de la Principauté de Liége. 1er Série: 974-1506 (Brussels, Gobbaerts, 1878)
- Stanislas Bormans, et al., eds., Cartulaire de la commune de Dinant (8 volumes, Namur, Wesmael-Charlier, 1880-1908)
- A. Grétry, Lettres inédites, edited by Stanislas Bormans (Liége, L. de Thier, 1883)
- Onofrio de Santa Croce, Mémoire du légat Onufrius sur les affaires de Liège (1468), edited by Stanislas Bormans (Brussels, Hayez, 1885) On Internet Archive
- Table analytique des matières contenues dans la chronique de Jean de Stavelot(Brussels, Hayez, 1887)
- Jean d'Outremeuse, Ly myreur des histors, introduction and index by Stanislas Bormans (Brussels, Hayez, 1887) On Internet Archive
- Stanislas Bormans, Edouard Poncelet and Emile Schoolmeesters, eds., Cartulaire de l'église Saint-Lambert de Liége (6 volumes, Brussels, Hayez, 1893-1933)
- Inventaire des cartulaires belges conservés à l'étranger (Brussels, Kiesseling, 1899)
- with Édouard Poncelet, Inventaire analytique des chartes de la Collégiale de Saint-Pierre à Liége (Brussels, Kiessling, 1906)
