= Drollinger =

Drollinger is a surname. Notable people with the surname include:

- D'Arcy Drollinger (born 1969), American actor, producer, and nightclub owner
- Ralph Drollinger (born 1954), American basketball player and clergyman

== See also ==
- Dollinger
