= Collège en Isle (Liège) =

Coordinates: 50°38′28″N 5°34′32″E

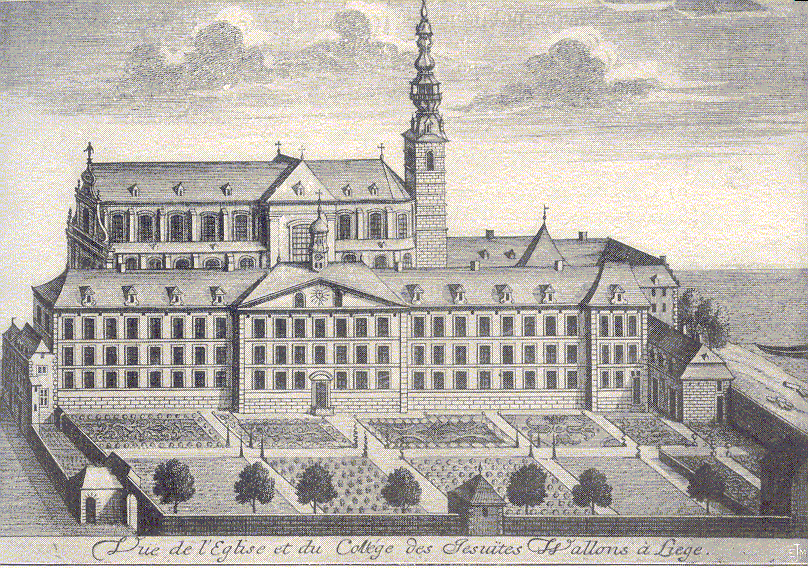
The Collège en Isle of Liège (engraving of 1740)

The Collège en Isle (in Latin Gymnasium Societatis Iesu in insula, Leodii) was a Jesuit secondary school located on the île de la Meuse in the Principality of Liège. Founded in 1582, it passed into other hands on the suppression of the Jesuits in 1773. Its pedagogical tradition was continued by the collège Saint-Servais, founded in Liège in 1828.

== See also ==
- List of Jesuit sites
