= Francis A. Arlinghaus =

American historian (1905–1993)

Francis Anthony Arlinghaus (June 13, 1905 – March 8, 1993) was an American historian.

== Early life and education ==
Arlinghaus was born June 13, 1905, in Cincinnati, Ohio. His parents were Francis Joseph Arlinghaus and Anna Rosswinkel Arlinghaus, both of German descent. He graduated from Xavier University in Cincinnati (Bachelor's degree) in 1926, with his major in English and minor in history. He graduated from the University of Cincinnati in 1929, with a master's degree: major, history; minor: political science. In 1931, he received a master's degree in history with a minor in government from Harvard University. In 1933 he received his Ph.D. in history from Harvard University with a doctoral dissertation entitled The Agadir Crisis: The System of Alliances and the Newspapers.

== Career ==
Arlinghus taught for many decades. Over the years, he broadened his interests, integrating his various areas of academic specialization. He identified these areas as:

- the History of Modern Germany since 1500
- the History of England since 1450
- the History of the Far East since 1793
- the History of the United States since 1789
- the History of Medieval France to 1461
- International Relations, especially of Europe since 1870

During the summers of 1931, 1932, and 1933, Arlinghaus taught history classes at Xavier University as a part-time instructor. On June 22, 1933, he signed a contract to begin a position as a full-time instructor in history at the University of Detroit (a Jesuit university). He remained at the University of Detroit throughout his career, rising through professorial ranks to full professor in 1947. In 1950 he became director of the University of Detroits's summer session and evening division. In 1957, he took charge of the newly organized “TV College” (which he had helped to promote as early as 1954) which offered credit courses on local public television affiliates. In addition, he performed the usual duties of teaching, research/publications, and lectures to outside groups on various historical and international affairs topics. From 1960 to 1964 he was the associate dean of the College of Arts and Sciences, and from 1964 to 1968, the vice president for student affairs. In April, 1968, after 35 years of service at the University of Detroit, he was named distinguished professor of history and also the University of Detroit's first university professor. He retired in 1969, but in 1977 he was appointed vice chairman of the Centennial Executive Committee and chairman of the Program Policy Committee for the Centennial Celebration of the University of Detroit.

Among his articles are "British Public Opinion and the Kulturkampf in Germany, 1871-1875" and "The Kulturkampf ad International Diplomacy, 1871-1875".

Dr. Arlinghaus received a number of awards and distinctions. Among these were the Prize Debate Medal at Xavier University in 1926; the Taft Fellowship in History at the University of Cincinnati, 1929–30; the Edward Austin Fellowship in History at Harvard, 1931–32; and a university fellowship, also at Harvard, 1932–33. In 1948 Arlinghaus became president of the American Catholic Historical Association. In 1953, he participated as a member of the Civilian Faculty Group of the National War College.

== Personal life ==
Arlinghaus married Blanche Therese Stolinski (1906–1995) on January 25, 1940. They had two sons, Francis Joseph Arlinghaus (born 1942) and William Charles Arlinghaus (born 1944).
