= Commission royale d'Histoire =

Belgian Royal Historical Commission

The Commission royale d'Histoire (in French) or Koninklijke Commissie voor Geschiedenis (in Dutch) is the Belgian Royal Historical Commission. It was founded by royal decree on 22 July 1834.

The Commission initially published their proceedings under the title Compte-rendu des séances de la commission royale d'histoire and since 1845 have published a journal, the Bulletin de la Commission royale d'Histoire / Handelingen van de Koninklijke Commissie voor Geschiedenis.

It is the mission of the Commission 'to undertake research, to identify, edit or analyse written sources of interest to the history of Belgium, to publish critical studies relating to these sources and to make working tools available to historians'. To fulfill this mission, the Commission has had numerous collaborators. In 1836, for example, Victor Coremans was given the task, under the Commission's supervision, of making the German-language archives from the National Archives of Belgium available for research.

== Presidents ==
- 1834-1871: Etienne de Gerlache
- 1871-1891: Joseph Kervyn de Lettenhove
- 1891-1912: Stanislas Bormans
- 1913-1922: Napoléon de Pauw
- 1922-1932: Ursmer Berlière
- 1933-1947: Édouard Poncelet
- 1947-1972: Charles Terlinden
- 1972-1980: Félix Rousseau
- 1980-1984: Adriaan Verhulst
- 1984-1986: Maurice-Aurélien Arnould
- 1987-1989: Jan Buntinx
- 1990-1993: Jean-Jacques Hoebanx
- 1993-1996: Jan Craeybeckx
- 1996-1999: André Goosse
- 1999-2002: Raoul van Caenegem
- 2002-2004: Jean-Louis Kupper
- 2005-2007: Ludo Milis
- 2008-2010: Jean-Marie Duvosquel
- 2011-2013: Gustaaf Janssens
- 2014-2016: Claude Bruneel
- 2016-2018: Thérèse De Hemptinne
- 2019-2021: Claude de Moreau de Gerbehaye
- 2022-2024: Karel Velle
