= Nelson Minnich =

American historian and author (born 1942)

- Born: Nelson Hubert Minnich; January 15, 1942 (age 84); Cincinnati, Ohio, U.S.
- Education: Boston College (BA, MA); Pontifical Gregorian University (STB); Harvard University (PhD)
- Occupations: Historian; author

Nelson Hubert Minnich (born January 15, 1942, in Cincinnati, Ohio) is an American historian and author who specializes in Catholic history.

== Life ==
Minnich completed his BA in philosophy (in 1965) and MA in history (in 1969) at Boston College and an STB in theology from the Gregorian University in 1970.

He earned his PhD in history at Harvard University in 1977. His doctoral thesis was Episcopal Reform at the Fifth Lateran Council and his doctoral advisor was Myron P. Gilmore.

== Career ==
Minnich joined the faculty of The Catholic University of America in 1977, becoming Ordinary Professor in 1993, with joint appointments in the History Department and in the Church History program of the School of Theology and Religious Studies .

He served as advisory and associate editor of The Catholic Historical Review, becoming the editor in 2005. He has served as an associate editor of the Encyclopedia of the Renaissance.

Minnich is the recipient of numerous fellowships: American Academy in Rome, American Council of Learned Societies, National Endowment for the Humanities, National Humanities Center, Renaissance Society of America, and Villa I Tatti. His publications deal broadly with Christian humanism; the Catholic and Protestant Reformations; and the papacy and general councils of the early modern period—especially the Fifth Lateran Council (1512–17), on which he has published numerous studies and a critical edition of its decrees. He has also worked on the controversy between Desiderius Erasmus of Rotterdam (c. 1467–1536) and Alberto III Pio (1475–1531), and the autobiography of Antonio degli Agli (c. 1400–77) These studies include four books, six edited or co-edited volumes, twenty-seven chapters in books, thirty-four articles in scholarly journals, and numerous entries in reference works and book reviews. He is a life-time member of the American Catholic Historical Association and of the Gesellschaft zur Herausgabe des Corpus Catholicorum and is active in the Societas Internationalis Historiae Conciliorum Investigandae. Since 2007 he has been a member of the Pontifical Committee of Historical Sciences.

== Bibliography ==
Some of Minnich's notable books are:

- Nelson H. Minnich Councils of the Catholic Reformation (New York, NY: Routledge, 2008)
- Nelson H. Minnich Journeys in Church History (Washington, DC: Catholic University of America Press, 2016)
- Nelson H. Minnich The Decrees of the Fifth Lateran Council (New York, NY Routledge, 2017)
