= The Catholic Historical Review =

American academic journal

- Discipline: History
- Language: English
- Edited by: Nelson Minnich

Publication details
- History: 1915–present
- Publisher: Catholic University of America Press (United States)
- Frequency: Quarterly

Standard abbreviations
- ISO 4: Cathol. Hist. Rev.

Indexing
- ISSN: 0008-8080
- JSTOR: 00088080
- OCLC no.: 1553555

Links
- Journal homepage

The Catholic Historical Review (CHR) is the official organ of the American Catholic Historical Association. It was established at The Catholic University of America in 1915 by Thomas Joseph Shahan and Peter Guilday and is published quarterly by The Catholic University of America Press. The first issue contained a foreword by Cardinal James Gibbons who wrote of the journal that "I bespeak for it a generous welcome by the thoughtful men and women of the country, and bestow my blessing on the unselfish, zealous labors of the devoted Faculty of the Catholic University." Nelson Minnich is the editor.

With an international readership and a global array of contributors, CHR publishes significant, original, and preferably archival-based articles in English on topics related to the history of various lived Catholic experiences and their intersections with cultures and other religious traditions over the centuries and throughout the world. In addition, the periodical publishes reviews (single, fora, essays, and articles) written by experts of important books in the field, lists relevant articles that appear in other journals, and includes the section "Notes and Comments" containing news about the Association and other items of interest to readers. Any scholar may submit a manuscript, which is subjected to a rigorous double-blind evaluation. In addition to being available in print form, The Catholic Historical Review is also available electronically through Project MUSE.

== Editors of the Catholic Historical Review ==
=== List of Editors ===
- Thomas Shahan, editor-in-chief (1915–29)
- Peter Guilday, Managing Editor (1929–41), editor-in-chief (1941–47)
- Patrick Browne, Managing Editor (1921–29)
- John Tracy Ellis, Managing Editor (1941–63)
- Robert Trisco, Managing Editor (1963–2005)
- Nelson H. Minnich, Editor (2005–)
