= Halkin (surname) =

The surname Halkin may have several possible origins. It may be derived from the diminutive Halkin produced by adding the diminutive suffix "-kin" to the pet name "Hal" for Henry. It may be a Polish-Jewish matronymic surname derived from the first name Halka (Галька), a diminutive/deprecative form of Halina/Galina. It may also be an English transliteration of the Belarusian or Ukrainian form of the Russian surname Galkin.

Notable people with the surname include:

- Adele Halkin, a plaintiff of the Halkin v. Helms case, United States
- Hillel Halkin
- Oleh Halkin
- Simon Halkin
- Léon Halkin
- Léon-Ernest Halkin
- Shmuel Halkin
- Barry Halkin, musician from The Notekillers
