= Leon van der Essen =

Belgian historian (1883–1963)

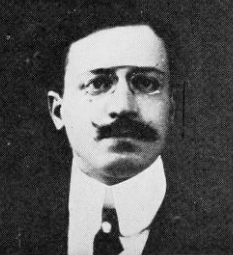
- Born: Leo Joannes van der Essen; 12 December 1883; Antwerp, Belgium
- Died: 10 February 1963 (aged 79); Leuven, Belgium

Academic background
- Education: Catholic University of Leuven
- Thesis: Etude critique et littéraire sur les Vitae des saints mérovingiens de l'ancienne Belgique (1907)
- Doctoral advisor: Alfred Cauchie

Academic work
- Discipline: Historian
- Sub-discipline: Hagiography, Military history

Leon van der Essen (1883–1963) was a Belgian historian, professor at the Catholic University of Leuven. In 1946 he testified about the German occupation of Belgium at the Nuremberg trials, the only Belgian witness called.

== Life ==
Van der Essen was born in Antwerp on 12 December 1883, the son of a painter-decorator. After graduating from a Jesuit secondary school in Antwerp he studied in Leuven under Alfred Cauchie, obtaining his doctorate in 1907 with a thesis on the lives of Merovingian saints. He became Cauchie's teaching assistant. In 1910 he married Gabrielle Callebert. Together they were to have three sons.

During the First World War he spent time at the University of Oxford, King's College, London, and the University of Chicago in 1914–1916, lecturing on Belgian history with a propaganda brief from the Belgian government in exile in Le Havre. He enlisted in 1916, but was seconded to the foreign ministry's propaganda service. After the war he was an adviser to the Belgian delegation at the Paris Peace Conference, 1919, and he was appointed a full professor at the university.

Although his early work as a historian focused on early-medieval hagiography, his main mature work was a 5-volume biography of Alexander Farnese, Duke of Parma (1545–1592), published 1933–1937. After the Second World War he published a series of short studies of aspects of the organisation and activities of the sixteenth-century Army of Flanders.

He fled Belgium in 1940, but returned to his post at the university after the French surrender. In November 1944 he was appointed to the Belgian Committee on War Crimes, and on 4 February 1946 he testified as the only Belgian witness at the International Military Tribunal in Nuremberg concerning German war crimes in Belgium, emphasizing the subversion of the Belgian constitution by the replacement of elected mayors in the major cities by ideologically sympathetic appointees.

A Festschrift was published in his honour in 1947: Miscellanea historica in honorem Leonis van der Essen.

In 1954 he retired as professor and was ennobled by King Baudouin. He died in Leuven on 10 February 1963.

== Work ==
- Petite histoire de l'invasion et de l'occupation allemande en Belgique (1917)
- Alexandre Farnese, prince de Parme, gouverneur general des Pays-Bas, 1545-1592, 5 vols. (Brussels, 1933-1937)
- Le siècle des saints (625-739): étude sur les origines de la Belgique chrétienne (Brussels, 1942)
- L'Université de Louvain: son origine, son histoire, son organisation, 1425-1953 (Brussels, 1953)
