= Belgian Historical Institute in Rome =

The Belgian Historical Institute in Rome (Dutch: Belgisch Historisch Instituut te Rome, French: Institut historique belge de Rome, Italian: Istituto storico belga di Roma), founded 1902, is a scholarly research institute focused on the study of Roman, and more broadly Italian, history and antiquities. It is currently located in the Academia Belgica and is one of a number of Roman Historical Institutes.

== Foundation ==
The idea for the foundation of a Belgian historical institute in Rome for the identification and publishing of Italian sources relating to Belgian history came from the ecclesiastical historian Alfred Cauchie, professor at the Catholic University of Leuven. He published a pamphlet to this effect in 1896.

The institute was founded in 1902, in the Palazzo Rusticucci-Accoramboni, with Ursmer Berlière as its first director.

== Publications ==
The institute has a strong focus on the publication of historical sources, primarily in the series Analecta Vaticano-Belgica.

The institute's Bulletin ceased publication in 2010 and has been replaced by a digital journal, Forum Romanum Belgicum.

== Directors ==
The directors of the institute have been the following:

- 1902–1906: Ursmer Berlière
- 1906-1916: Godefroid Kurth
- 1916-1918: Charles Moeller
- 1918-1922: Alfred Cauchie
- 1922-1930: Ursmer Berlière
- 1930-1935: Henri Pirenne
- 1935-1947: Joseph Cuvelier
- 1947-1955: Camille Tihon
- 1955-1972: Charles Terlinden
- 1972-1986: Léon-Ernest Halkin
- 1986-2001: Ludo Milis
- 2001-2009: Michel Dumoulin
- 2009-: Jan De Maeyer
