= Victor Coremans =

Belgian archivist, journalist, historian and political activist

Victor Amédée Jacques Marie Coremans
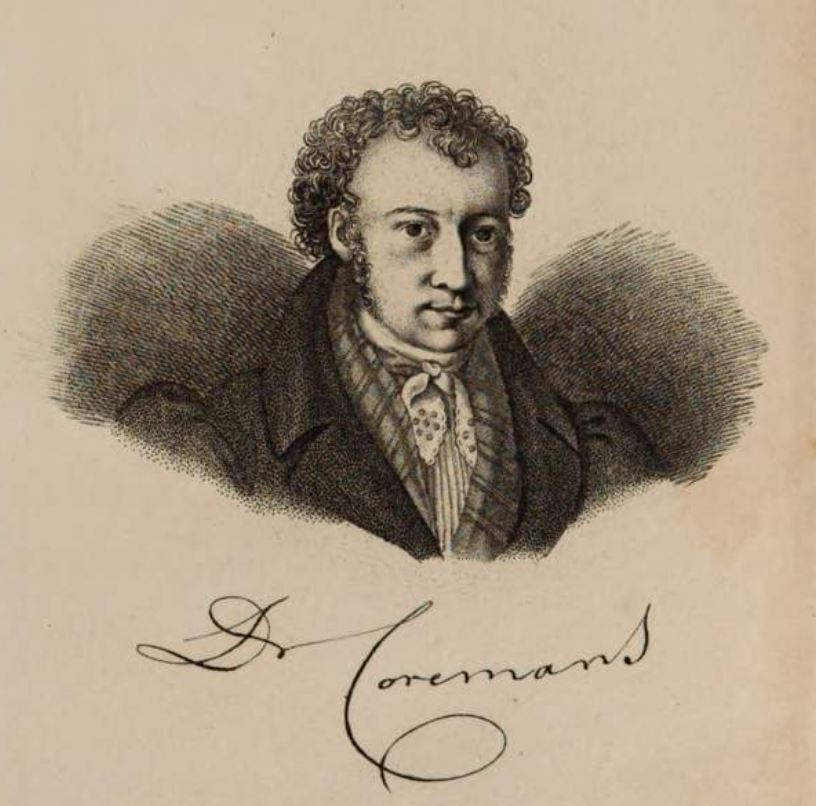
- Born: October 5, 1802; Brussels, Dyle, France (now Belgium)
- Died: October 23, 1872 (aged 70); Ixelles, Belgium
- Occupations: Archivist, journalist, scholar
- Writing career
- Language: German
- Subjects: Politics, culture, history
- Notable works: Die Stimme aus dem Kerker; Kerkerblumen; Die göttlichen Befreier

Victor Amédée Jacques Marie Coremans (5 October 1802 – 23 October 1872) was a Belgian archivist, journalist, historian, and political activist. He supported the Flemish Movement, advocating nationhood for Flanders.

== Life and career ==
Victor was born in Brussels on 5 October 1802, the son of Jacques-Jean Coremans, a judge, and Anne-Marie Vandersande. In 1821 he was banished from Vienna for sedition. In 1824 he edited the Erlanger Zeitung. From 1831 to 1832, while living in Munich, he published and edited the Nuremberg radical newspaper Die Freie Presse (The Free Press). The Bavarian authorities responded by laying political charges on him, for which he was imprisoned. While in prison he wrote three German-language books that were well-received in Germany: Die Stimme aus dem Kerker (The Voice from the Dungeon), Kerkerblumen (Dungeon Flowers), and Die göttlichen Befreier (The Divine Liberator).

After his release he spent some time in Switzerland before returning to his native Belgium. On 13 April 1836, he was appointed as a collaborator to the newly created Commission royale d'Histoire in Brussels. His task was to make the German collection in the National Archives of Belgium available for research. He published some of his own findings from the archives in several publications.

His scholarly writing addressed various topics in the history, culture, and politics of Belgium, Germany, and Austria. He published scholarly pieces in the Bulletin de la Commission royale d'histoire (1844–1847) and in the Revue d'histoire et d'archéologie (1860–1863). One article examined the origins and permutations of the legendary monarch Gambrinus. Throughout his later career he continued to promote liberal ethnic nationalism, and especially Flemish nationhood, through his writing in such journals as Vlaamsch België, De Noordstar, and De Zweep.

On 7 August 1872, he retired from the National Archives. He died in Ixelles on 23 October 1872.

== See also ==
- Flemish Movement
- Liberalism in Belgium
