= Henri Helbig =

Henri Antoine Helbig (1813–1890) was a Belgian antiquarian and bibliophile of German descent.

== Life ==
Born in Gutenberg, Germany, on 3 July 1813, Helbig was raised first in Mainz and later in Liège. In 1846 he opened an antiquarian bookshop in Liège. In 1853 he gave up bookselling to become accountant and secretary to the Espérance metalworks in Seraing, where he continued to work until 1875. He died on 21 May 1890.

== Publications ==
From 1839 Helbig was a contributor to the Messager des sciences historiques and from 1845 to the Bulletin du bibliophile belge of the Société des bibliophiles belges and later its successor serial, Le bibliophile belge. He also published in the Bulletin de l'Institut archéologique liégeois, the Bulletin de la Société des Bibliophiles liégeois, the Revue belge de numismatique, and the newspaper La Meuse, as well as writing several entries in the Biographie Nationale de Belgique.
