= Günther Dollinger =

German physicist

Günther Dollinger (born 2 August 1960 in Kempten) is a German physicist and professor at the University of the Bundeswehr Munich.

== Life ==
Dollinger completed his doctoral studies in physics at the Technical University of Munich (TUM). He is currently head of the Institute of Applied Physics and Measurement Technology within the Faculty of Aeronautics and Astronautics at the University of the Bundeswehr Munich. He conducts research in different interdisciplinary and interinstitutional research projects. He is a member of the Munich Centre for Advanced Photonics, an inter-university excellence cluster, funded by the German government, based at LMU Munich.

== Awards ==
For his doctoral dissertation titled Carbon film as a stripper for heavy ions Günther Dollinger was awarded doctoral and postdoctoral price of the Association of Friends of the Technical University of Munich.

In January 2025, Günther Dollinger received the MLZ Prize for “Instrumentation and Scientific Use” for his work on the positron source at the Heinz Maier-Leibnitz Zentrum (MLZ). Dollinger's working group developed the PLEPS (pulsed low-energy positron system) instrument as one of the central devices at the MLZ positron source.

== Research ==
Together with his team at the Institute of Experimental Physics of the TUM in Garching, Günther Dollinger developed a new type of microscopy methods for material analysis. For the first time it allows the three-dimensional analysis of the distribution of hydrogen in microstructured samples.

== Personal ==
Dollinger is married, lives in Garching near Munich, and is the father of former beach volleyball players Sebastian and Armin Dollinger, as well as another son who works as a math and physics teacher.
