= Édouard Poncelet =

Belgian archivist and historian

Édouard Clément Antoine Poncelet (1865–1947) was a Belgian archivist and historian who served as president of the Commission royale d'Histoire.

== Life ==
Poncelet was born to a bourgeois family in Liège on 11 December 1865. After completing the candidature degree at the University of Liège in 1884 he joined the Belgian State Archive service. In December 1894 he was appointed assistant conservator of the State Archives in Mons, where he subsequently became conservator. He devoted much of his time to studying cartularies and publishing editions of charters. He also had a particular interest in sigillography. A considerable part of his unpublished work as an archivist was destroyed when Mons was bombed during the German invasion of Belgium (1940). He became a member of the Commission royale d'Histoire in 1920, and president in 1933. He was also a member of many other Belgian learned societies in the fields of history, antiquities, archaeology, art history and bibliography. He died on 11 March 1947.

== Publications ==
- Les sénéchaux de l'évêché de Liége (Liège, 1897)
- Le livre des fiefs de l'Eglise de Liège sous Adolphe de la Marck (Brussels, 1898)
- Les bons métiers de la cité de Liège (Liège, 1900)
- Les maréchaux d'armée de l'évêche de Liége (Liège, 1903)
- Inventaire analytique des chartes de la Collégiale de Saint-Pierre à Liége (Brussels, 1906)
- Le drapeau des volontaires du Hainaut en 1790 (Mons, 1908)
- with Ernest Matthieu, Relation du siège de la ville d'Ath en 1697: éd. d'après un manuscrit de la Bibliothèque Impériale de Vienne (Mons, 1910)
- Inventaire analytique des chartes de la collégiale de Sainte-Croix à Liège (Brussels, 1911)
- Sceaux des villes, communes, échevinages et juridictions civiles de la province de Liège (Liège, 1923)
- L'avouerie de la cité de Liège (Liège, 1932)
- Les sceaux et les chancelleries des princes-évêques de Liège (Liège, 1938)
- Meuse à Liège en 1553, la Meuse à Leuth en 1561, la terre libre de Leuth (Liège, 1939)
- Le Perron et les sceaux de la ville de Huy (Liège, 1939)
- Actes des princes-évêques de Liège : Hugues de Pierrepont 1200-1229 (Brussels, 1941)
- Inventaire des dépêches du Conseil privé de Liège (Liège, 1947)
- Les domaines urbains de Liège (Liège, 1947)
- with Stanislas Bormans and Emile Schoolmeesters, Cartulaire de l'église Saint-Lambert de Liége, 6 volumes (Brussels, 1893–1933)
