= Léon Halkin =

Belgian historian and classicist (1872–1955)

Léon Nicolas Marie Joseph Halkin (1872–1955) was a Belgian historian and classicist who spent much of his life as a professor at the University of Liège.

== Life ==
Halkin was born in Liège on 28 December 1872, the younger brother of Joseph Halkin (1870-1937), who became professor of geography at the University of Liège. He studied Greek and Latin at the Athénée royal de Liège, and graduated from the University of Liège on 24 July 1894 with a doctorate in classical philology. His doctoral thesis, "Les esclaves publics chez les Romains", was published in Brussels in 1897. In 1895, he won a travel bursary, with which he studied at the Collège de France and the École pratique des hautes études in Paris, following courses by Antoine Héron de Villefosse, René Cagnat and Louis Havet.

Halkin briefly taught at the Athénée royal de Mons (1896) and the École des Cadets in Namur (1897) and, on 20 February 1900, he was appointed to the University of Liège, where he remained for the next forty-three years. He became a full professor in 1908, and retired on 28 December 1942.

Halkin was a practising Catholic who was a member of the Third Order of Saint Francis and of the Society of Saint Vincent de Paul. He was married to Elvire Courtoy (1873–1947), with whom he had five children, including Léon-Ernest Halkin, professor of history at the University of Liège, and the Bollandist François Halkin. He died at Esneux on 3 September 1955.

== Writings ==
- Les esclaves publics chez les Romains (Brussels, 1897)
- Lettres inédites du Baron G. de Crassier à Bernard de Montfaucon (Leuven, 1897)
- Correspondance de Dom E. Martène avec le Baron G. de Crassier (Brussels, 1898)
- Correspondance de J.-F. Schannat avec G. de Crassier et Dom E. Marlene (Brussels, 1903)
- Les origines du Collège des Jésuites et du Séminaire de Liège (Liège, 1927)
- Les Frères de la Vie commune de la Maison Saint-Jérôme de Liège (Liège, 1945)
- Lettres inédites du bollandiste Du Sollier à l'historien Schannat, 1721-1734 (Brussels, 1945)
- Une description inédite de la ville de Liège en 1705 (Liège, 1948)
- La supplication d'action de grâce chez les Romains (Paris, 1953)
