= Joseph Ferdinand Damberger =

Joseph Ferdinand Damberger (1 March 1795 – 1 April 1859) was a historian of the Catholic Church.

== Biography ==
Damberger was born in Passau, Bavaria. After completing his earlier studies in the public schools of his native town, he pursued the study of law at Landshut, then studied theology at Salzburg, Landshut, and Munich, and was ordained a priest in 1818. While at the Munich Lyceum he had also devoted himself to historical studies. Until 1837 he was particularly active as a preacher at Landshut and at St. Cajetan's, Munich. His first historical works appeared in Ratisbon in 1831, three closely related narratives:

- Fürstentafel der Staatengeschichte
- Fürstenbuch zur Fürstentafel der europäischen Staatengeschichte
- Sechzig genealogische, chronologische und statistische Tabellen zur Fürstentafel und Fürstenbuch

In 1837, Damberger joined the Society of Jesus, completed his novitiate at Brieg, canton of Valais, Switzerland, where he spent about ten years, partly as a mission-preacher and partly as professor of ecclesiastical history at Lucerne. A collection of his mission sermons was printed (Lucerne, 1842; 2nd ed., 1852), but was violently attacked (Missionsunfug der Jesuiten; Bern, 1842). The defeat of the Sonderbund (1847) brought with it the expulsion of the Jesuits from Switzerland. Damberger then spent several years in Innsbruck and Regensburg, and in 1853 became confessor at the Convent of Schäftlarn in Bavaria, where he died. He was working on Synchronistische Geschichte der Kirche und der Welt im Mittelalter (Ratisbon, 1850–63). The last volume was finished and published after his death by Daniel Rattinger. The narrative reaches the year 1378. In its day it was considered an important piece of work.
