= Marc Dollinger =

American writer and professor (born 1964)

- Born: San Francisco, California, United States
- Education: University of California, Berkeley; University of California, Los Angeles
- Occupations: professor and author
- Employer: San Francisco State University
- Spouse: Marci
- Writing career
- Notable works: Black Power, Jewish Politics: Reinventing the Alliance in the 1960s

Marc Dollinger (born 1964) is an American writer and a professor of Jewish studies at San Francisco State University. He is best known for his book Black Power, Jewish Politics.

== Early life and education ==
Dollinger was born in San Francisco in 1964, a 5th generation San Franciscan, and grew up in Sherman Oaks in Southern California. He attended U.C. Berkeley as an undergraduate and received both his M.A. and Ph.D. in history from UCLA.

== Career ==
Dollinger holds the Richard and Rhoda Goldman Chair in Jewish Studies and Social Responsibility at San Francisco State University, where he has taught courses in American Jewish history, modern Jewish history, and antisemitism for over 20 years. Dollinger is known for his research on Jewish-Black relations during the Civil Rights movement and is the author of Black Power, Jewish Politics: Reinventing the Alliance of the 1960s (2018). His upcoming book, Laundering Antisemitism: Jews, Identity Politics, and the University, combines memoir and analysis, examining his experiences as a professor.

At Pasadena City College in the 1990s, Dollinger experienced conflicts with right-wing faculty members, while at San Francisco State University, he faced criticism from anti-Zionist students and faculty. He has advocated for free speech and the rights of students and addressed the administration's response to anti-Zionist protests in 2016. These efforts contributed to a settlement aimed at improving the campus environment for Jewish students.

Dollinger's academic work and teaching address Jewish identity, Zionism, and their relationship with contemporary progressive politics. Recent events such as a protest at the University of Michigan in 2023 influenced revisions to his latest book. His work engages with students to examine issues related to Jewish identity and Zionism in modern contexts.

Earlier in his career Dollinger also taught at Cal State Northridge, Bryn Mawr College, Long Beach State, and Hebrew Union College in Los Angeles.

== Personal life ==
Dollinger married his wife Marci in 1994. They have two daughters and live in San Rafael, California.

== Bibliography ==
- Laundering Antisemitism: Jews, Identity Politics, and the University, Indiana University Press, forthcoming.
- Black Power, Jewish Politics: Reinventing the Alliance in the 1960s, Brandeis University Press, 2018.
- American Jewish History: A Primary Source Reader, Brandeis University Press, 2014. (co-edited with Gary Phillip Zola).
- California Jews, Brandeis University Press, 2003. (co-edited with Ava Fran Kahn).
- Quest for Inclusion: Jews and Liberalism in Modern America, Princeton University Press, 2000.
- The Family History: The History of the Dollinger-Levy Family from 1792 to 1987, M. Dollinger, 1986.

== See also ==
- African American–Jewish relations
- Racism in Jewish communities
