= Robert Génestal =

French legal historian (1872–1931)

- Born: 1872
- Died: 1931 (aged 58–59)
- Occupations: historian of canon law and French law
- Employers: University of Caen Normandy; University of Paris; École Pratique des Hautes Études
- Known for: scholarship on canon law

Robert Génestal (1872–1931) was a French historian of canon law and French law who taught first at the Faculty of Law of the University of Caen and later at the Faculty of Law of the University of Paris. He was director of studies for the history of canon law at the École Pratique des Hautes Études.

== Publications ==
- La tenure en bourgage dans les pays régis par la coutume de Normandie (Paris, 1900)
- Le Rôle des monastères comme établissements de crédit étudié en Normandie du XIe à la fin du XIIIe siècle (Paris, 1901)
- Le privilegium fori en France du Décret de Gratiën à la fin du XIVe siècle (2 vols., Paris, 1921-1924)
- La Tutelle (Caen, 1930)
