= Galkin =

Galkin (masculine, Russian: Галкин) or Galkina (feminine, Russian: Галкина) is a Russian surname. It is derived from Galka (Russian: галка, jackdaw) Alternatively, among Eastern European Jews, Galkin may be an altered transliteration of Halkin, consistent with the common Eastern Slavic shift of the /h/ sound to /g/.

Notable people with the surname include:

- Aleksey Galkin, Russian GRU officer
- Aleksandr Galkin (1948–2018), Russian football coach and former football player
- Aleksandr Galkin (born 1979), Russian chess grandmaster
- Evgeni Galkin (born 1975), Russian professional ice hockey winger
- Maxim Galkin (born 1976), Russian-Israeli comedian, singer, and TV host
- Pavel Galkin (born 1968), Russian sprinter
- Pavel Andreyevich Galkin (1922–2021), Soviet military pilot, Hero of the Soviet Union
- Vladislav Galkin (1971–2010), Russian actor

== Galkina ==
- Gulnara Samitova-Galkina (born 1978), Russian middle-distance runner
- Katsiaryna Halkina (born 1997), Belarusian rhythmic gymnast
- Lyubov Galkina (born 1973), Russian sport shooter
- Lyudmila Galkina (born 1972), Russian athlete
- Ekaterina Galkina (born 1988), Russian curler
