= Charles Moeller (historian) =

Belgian historian (1838–1922)

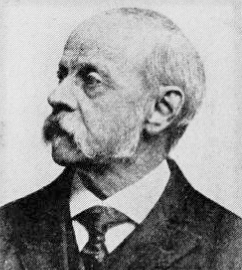
- Born: Charles Clément Auguste Moeller; 14 April 1838; Leuven, Belgium
- Died: 28 July 1922 (aged 84); Uccle, Belgium
- Occupation: Historian

Charles Clément Auguste Moeller (1838–1922) was a Belgian historian.

== Life ==
Moeller was born in Leuven on 14 April 1838, the son of Jean Moeller, a professor of history at the newly refounded Catholic University of Leuven. He himself became a lecturer at the same university in 1863, teaching courses on the political history of classical antiquity and of the Middle Ages. From 1883 he also taught contemporary history. In 1891 he stopped teaching ancient history. His son, Alfred Alphonse Moeller, became a colonial administrator, governor of Orientale Province in the Belgian Congo, and later a businessman.

To mark his fifty years of teaching at the university (1863–1913), a two-volume Festschrift was published by former members of the historical seminar in Leuven, Mélanges d'histoire offerts à Charles Moeller (Leuven and Paris, 1914). At the outbreak of the First World War he briefly became a refugee in Oxford. In 1916 he was appointed director of the Belgian Historical Institute in Rome. He retired in 1919, and died in Uccle (Brussels) on 28 July 1922.

== Publications ==
- Éléonore d'Autriche et de Bourgogne, reine de France (Paris, 1895)
- Histoire du moyen âge depuis la chute de l'Empire romain jusqu'à la fin de l'époque franque, 476-950 (2 vols., Leuven and Paris, 1898-1902)
- Histoire politique générale, vol. 5: La politique des États européens durant la seconde moitié du siècle dernier, de 1850 à 1900 (Paris, 1912)
- Histoire contemporaine, 1850-1890 (Leuven and Paris, 1913)
