= Peter Guilday =

American Catholic historian (1884–1947)

Rev. Dr. Peter K. Guilday
- Born: March 25, 1884; Chester, Pennsylvania, United States
- Died: July 31, 1947 (aged 63); Washington, D.C., United States
- Board member of: Catholic Historical Review; American Catholic Historical Association

Academic background
- Education: Roman Catholic High School, Philadelphia
- Alma mater: Catholic University of Louvain, Belgium
- Thesis: The English Colleges and Convents in the Catholic Low Countries, 1558–1795 (1914)
- Doctoral advisor: Alfred Cauchie

Academic work
- Discipline: Historian
- Sub-discipline: Church History
- Institutions: Catholic University of America

Ecclesiastical career
- Religion: Christianity
- Church: Roman Catholic Church
- Ordained: July 11, 1909
- Congregations: St Mary of the Angels, Bayswater

Monsignor Peter Keenan Guilday (March 25, 1884 - July 31, 1947) American Catholic priest and historian.

== Life ==
Guilday was born in Chester, Pennsylvania of Irish parents. Graduated from Roman Catholic High School in Philadelphia in 1901. He studied for the priesthood at St. Charles Borromeo Seminary, Overbrook PA. In 1907 he gained a scholarship to the American College of Louvain. He was ordained to the priesthood there on July 11, 1909, by Henry Gabriels.

After ordination, Guilday briefly studied at the University of Bonn, but returned to Louvain University to work on his doctorate, which he obtained there in 1914. His doctoral dissertation was supervised by Alfred Cauchie. While working on his doctorate, Guilday visited archives in France, Belgium, Spain, and Italy and spent a year in London, working as a priest at St Mary of the Angels, Bayswater, while attending lectures in history at the University of London.

His doctoral dissertation was published in London in 1914 by Longmans, Green and Company under the title The English Catholic Refugees on the Continent, 1558–1795, volume 1. Guilday intended to follow this up with a second volume on the Irish Colleges on the Continent, but research for this was made impossible by the outbreak of World War I.

Instead, in 1914, Guilday began teaching at Catholic University of America, Rector Thomas J. Shahan having asked Edmond Francis Prendergast, Archbishop of Philadelphia, to release him from diocesan duties so that he could join the faculty. During the war, Guilday also served as secretary to the National Catholic War Council's committee on historical records and as assistant district educational director in the Students Army Training Corps.

As an academic, Guilday worked as principal editor of the Catholic Historical Review from 1915 to 1941, and in 1919 was cofounder of the American Catholic Historical Association. His writings established him as the period's leading scholar in Catholic Church History, with appointment as full professor in 1923. He was relieved of teaching duties in 1941, and intended to use his time to produce a study of John Hughes, Archbishop of New York, but was prevented by poor health. He died in 1947.

== Honours ==
- In 1924 Guilday was elected a fellow of the Royal Historical Society.
- In 1926 he was decorated by Albert I of Belgium for his contributions to the restoration of Louvain University Library.
- In 1935 he was made a domestic prelate by Pope Pius XI.

== Works ==
- The English Catholic Refugees on the Continent, 1558–1795, 1914 LCCN 14-20382
- The Life and Times of John Carroll, Archbishop of Baltimore (1735-1815), 1922; 1954 edition. Newman Press. LCCN 54011374.
- The Catholic church in Virginia (1815-1822) (New York: United States Catholic Historical Society, 1924) LCCN 25-1406
- An introduction to church history, a book for beginners (St. Louis: B. Herder Book Company, 1925) LCCN 25-10604
- John Gilmary Shea: Father of American Catholic History, 1824-1892 (New York: United States Catholic Historical Society, 1926)
- The Life and Times of John England, First Bishop of Charleston (1786-1842), 1927 LCCN 27-23161
