= Revue d'histoire ecclésiastique =

- Discipline: Ecclesiastical history
- Language: English; French; German
- Edited by: Mathijs Lamberigts

Publication details
- History: 1900–1915; 1921–present
- Publisher: Université catholique de Louvain · Katholieke Universiteit Leuven (Belgium)
- Frequency: Quarterly

Standard abbreviations
- ISO 4: Rev. Hist. Ecclés.

Indexing
- ISSN: 0035-2381

Links
- Journal homepage

Revue d'histoire ecclésiastique is a peer-reviewed academic journal in the field of ecclesiastical history. Independent third-party sources have described it as "The best international church-historical journal".

It was established in 1900 at the Catholic University of Louvain by Alfred Cauchie. Publication was suspended during the First World War, resuming again only in 1921. Since 1970, it is jointly published by the University of Louvain (UCLouvain, in Louvain-la-Neuve) and KU Leuven.
