= Ursmer Berlière =

Belgian monk and historian

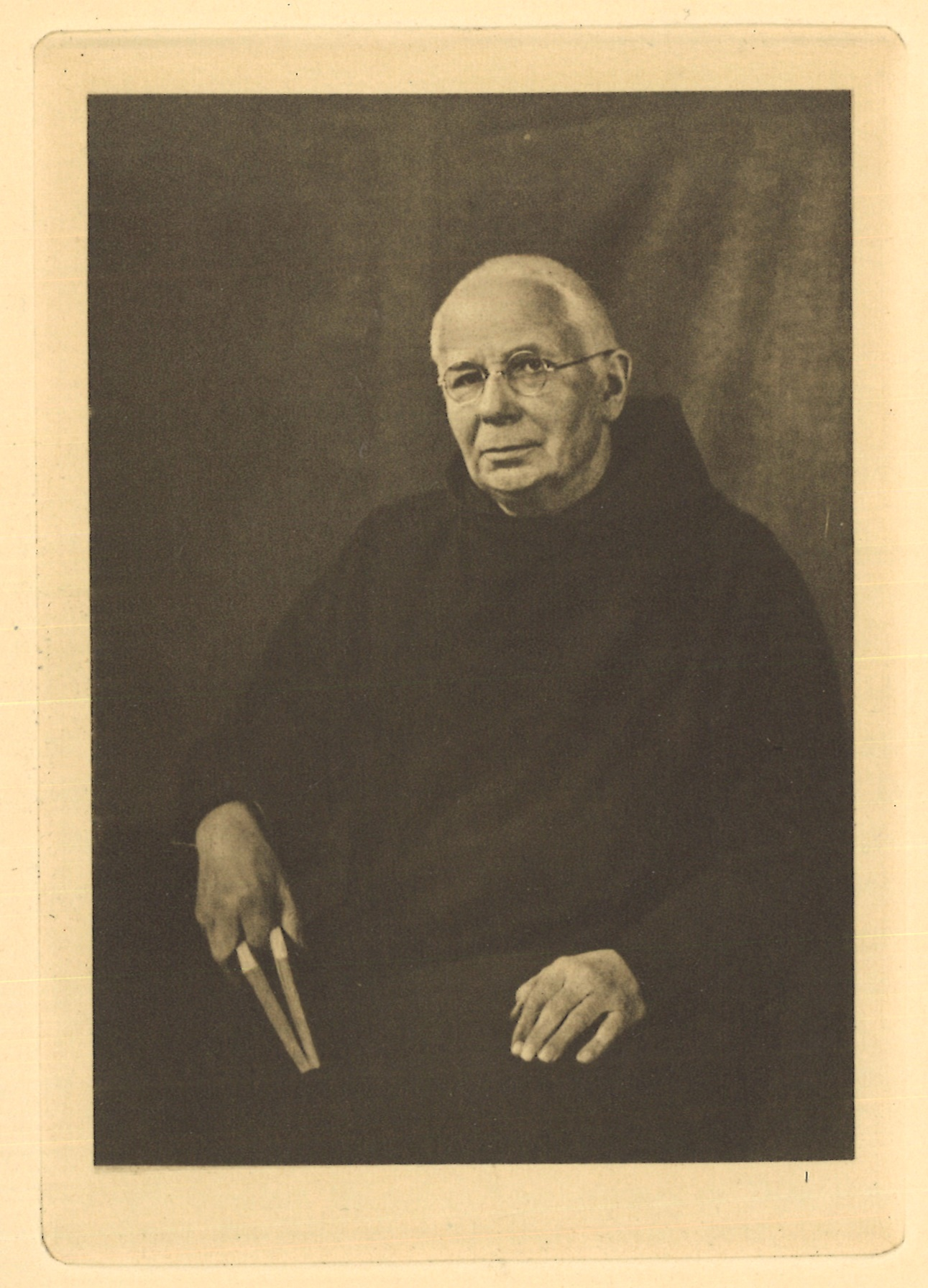
Ursmer Berlière

Ursmer Berlière, born Alfred Berlière (1861–1932) was a monk of Maredsous Abbey and a monastic historian whose bibliography ran to 360 publications.

== Life ==
Berlière was born in Gosselies on 3 September 1861 and was educated at the Jesuit college in Charleroi and the minor seminary in Vellereille-les-Brayeux. He was clothed as a monk of Maredsous Abbey in 1881 and solemnly professed in 1882. From 1883 to 1885 he studied Theology and German at Seckau Abbey in Austria. He was ordained priest 18 September 1886. He taught in the abbey school for a number of years, and published his historical research in the Revue Bénédictine.

In 1890 he launched the Monasticon belge, a prosopography of pre-1801 Belgian monasticism that would eventually run to 23 volumes, with publication completed in 1993. From 1902 to 1906, and again from 1922 to 1930, he was director of the Belgian Historical Institute in Rome, and from 1912 to 1914 chief curator of the Royal Library of Belgium in Brussels. In 1931 a Festschrift was published in his honour under the title Hommage à dom Berlière. He died in Maredsous on 27 August 1932.

== Publications ==
- Le moine Baudouin d'Aulne (Leuven, 1889)
- La chronique de Jean de Sivry, prieur de Bonne-Espérance (n.p., 1891)
- L'ancien prieuré bénédictin de Frasnes-lez-Gosselies (Brussels, 1891)
- Philippe de Harvengt, abbé de Bonne-Espérance (Bruges, 1892)
- Documents inédits pour servir à l'histoire ecclésiastique de la Belgique (Maredsous, 1894)
- Mélanges d'histoire bénédictine (4 vols., Maredsous, 1897–1901)
- Les manuscrits de l'ancienne abbaye de Sainte-Vanne de Verdun (1745) (Besançon, 1897)
- La prévoté de Renissart à Arquennes (Mons, 1898)
- Mélanges d'histoire bénédictine. Deuxième série (Maredsous, 1899)
- Inventaire des obituaires belges (collégiales et maisons religieuses) (Brussels, 1899)
- Les origines de Cîteaux et l'ordre bénédictin au XIIe siècle (Louvain, 1901)
- Aux archives vaticanes (Bruges, 1903)
- Inventaire analytique des Libri obligationum et solutionum des Archives vaticanes, au point de vue des anciens diocèses de Cambrai, Liège, Thérouanne et Tournai (Rome, 1904)
- Un ami de Pétrarque : Louis Sanctus de Beeringen (Rome, 1905)
- Les évêques auxiliaires de Cambrai et de Tournai (Bruges, 1905)
- Les abbés de Lobbes au XIVe siècle (Mons, 1906)
- Inventaire analytique des Diversa Cameralia des archives vaticanes (1389-1500) au point de vue des anciens diocèses de Cambrai, Liége, Thérouanne et Tournai (Rome, 1906)
- Suppliques de Clément VI, 1342-1352 (Rome, 1906)
- Le prieuré de Sart-les-Moines en 1352 (Mons, 1907)
- Jean Bernier de Fayt abbé de Saint-Bavon de Gand 1350-1395 d'après des documents vaticans (Bruges, 1907)
- Mabillon et la Belgique (Ligugé, 1908)
- Oraison funèbre du révérendissime père Dom Placide Wolter, archiabbé de Beuron, premier abbé de Maredsous, prononcée en l'église abbatiale de Maredsous, le 13 octobre 1908 (Bruges, 1908)
- Epaves d'archives pontificales au XIVe siècle (Bruges, 1908)
- La commende aux Pays-Bas (Liége, 1908)
- Frédéric de Laroche, évêque d'Acre et archevêque de Tyr: envoi de reliques à l'abbaye de Florennes, 1153-1161 (Arlon, 1908)
- Suppliques d'Innocent VI, 1352-1362 (Rome, 1911)
- L'ordre monastique des origines au XIIe siècle (Maredsous, 1912)
  - L'ordine monastico dalle origini al secolo XII, translated by Maria Zappalà (Bari, 1928)
- Un bibliophile du IXe siècle: Loup de Ferrières (Mons, 1912)
- Lettres des moines d'Afflighem aux Benedictins de Saint-Maur, 1642-1672 (Antwerp, 1913)
- Les évêques auxiliaires de Liège (Bruges, 1919)
- Les fraternités monastiques et leur rôle juridique (Brussels, 1920)
- Les terres et seigneuries de Maredsous et de Maharenne (Maredsous, 1920)
- Recherches historiques sur la ville de Gosselies (3 vols., Maredsous, 1922–1932).
- La dévotion au Sacré-Coeur dans l'Ordre de S. Benoit (Paris, 1923)
- Philippe de Harvengt: abbé de Bonne-Espérance c. 1157-1183 (Charleroi, 1923)
- Les monastères doubles aux XIIe et XIIIe siècles (Brussels, 1923)
- Inventaire des Instrumenta miscellanea des Archives vaticanes : au point de vue de nos anciens diocèses (Liège, 1924)
- Le recrutement dans les monastères bénédictins aux XIIIe et XIVe siècles (Brussels, 1924)
- L'ascèse bénédictine des origines à la fin du XIIe siècle: essai historique (Maredsous, 1927)
- Les élections abbatiales au Moyen Age (Brussels, 1927)
- Thierry de Homborch OSB, Abbé de Bursfeld (†1485) (Maredsous, 1929)
- Les collectories pontificales dans les anciens diocèses de Cambrai, Thérouanne et Tournai au XIVe siècle (Rome, 1929)
- Coup d'oeil historique sur l'Ordre bénédictin en Belgique dans le passé et dans le présent (Maredsous, 1930)
- L'auteur de "Sancta Sophia", Dom Augustin Baker OSB (†1641) (Maredsous, 1929)
- La familia dans les monastères bénédictins du Moyen Age (Brussels, 1931)

== Literature ==
- Bernard Joassart, "Ursmer Berlière et les Bollandistes Albert Poncelet et Hippolyte Delehaye", Analecta Bollandiana 131/1 (2013), pp. 134–153.
