= Centre scolaire Saint-Benoît Saint-Servais de Liège =

Catholic school in Liege, Belgium

Coordinates: 50°38′21″N 5°33′48″E

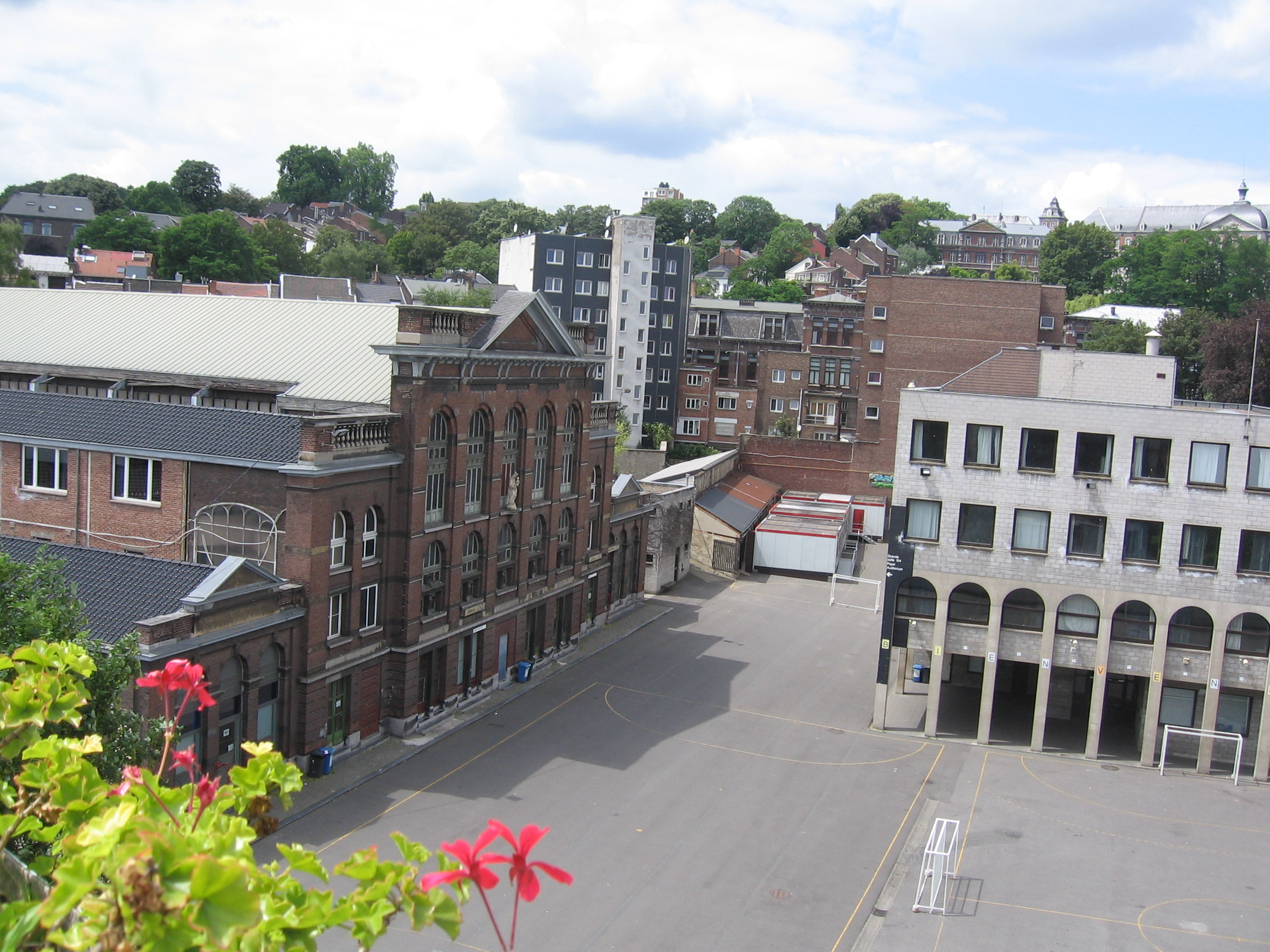
Inner courtyard of Saint-Servais High school, Liège

The Collège Saint-Servais is a Catholic school in Liège, Belgium. Founded in 1838, it revived the educational tradition of the suppressed Collège en Isle. When it became co-educational in 1992, it was renamed the Collège Saint-Benoît Saint-Servais. The pedagogy of the collège is Jesuit, as based on their Ratio studiorum; most of the teachers are now lay-people.

== See also ==
- List of Jesuit sites in Belgium
- Diocese of Liège
