= American Catholic Historical Association =

The American Catholic Historical Association (ACHA) was founded by Peter Guilday in Cleveland, Ohio, in December 1919 as a national society to bring together scholars interested in the history of the Roman Catholic Church or in Catholic aspects of secular history. It aims to promote a deeper and more widespread knowledge of the history of the Catholic Church and the advancement of historical scholarship. The ACHA has always enjoyed the support of Catholic universities, colleges, and seminaries and has endeavored, in turn, to make itself especially helpful to their teachers and students. It welcomes non-Catholics among its members and has elected many of them to its committees, its executive council, and even its presidency. There are approximately 1,100 members.

The ACHA adopted as its official organ The Catholic Historical Review, which had been appearing quarterly since April 1915.

The ACHA holds a general meeting each year on the Friday, Saturday, and Sunday following New Year's Day. It meets in a different city each year but always jointly with the American Historical Association, with which it is affiliated, and with other historical societies. The ACHA is a recognized Catholic voice in the historical profession in the United States. It is one of the three societies that make up the American National Commission of the International Commission for Comparative Church History.

It has EIN 52-6041154 as a 501(c)(3) Public Charity; in 2023 it reported total revenue of $168,121 and total assets of $1,774,997.

== Sources ==
- Profile at American Historical Association
