= Jean Wauquelin presenting his 'Chroniques de Hainaut' to Philip the Good =

Miniature attributed to Rogier van der Weyden

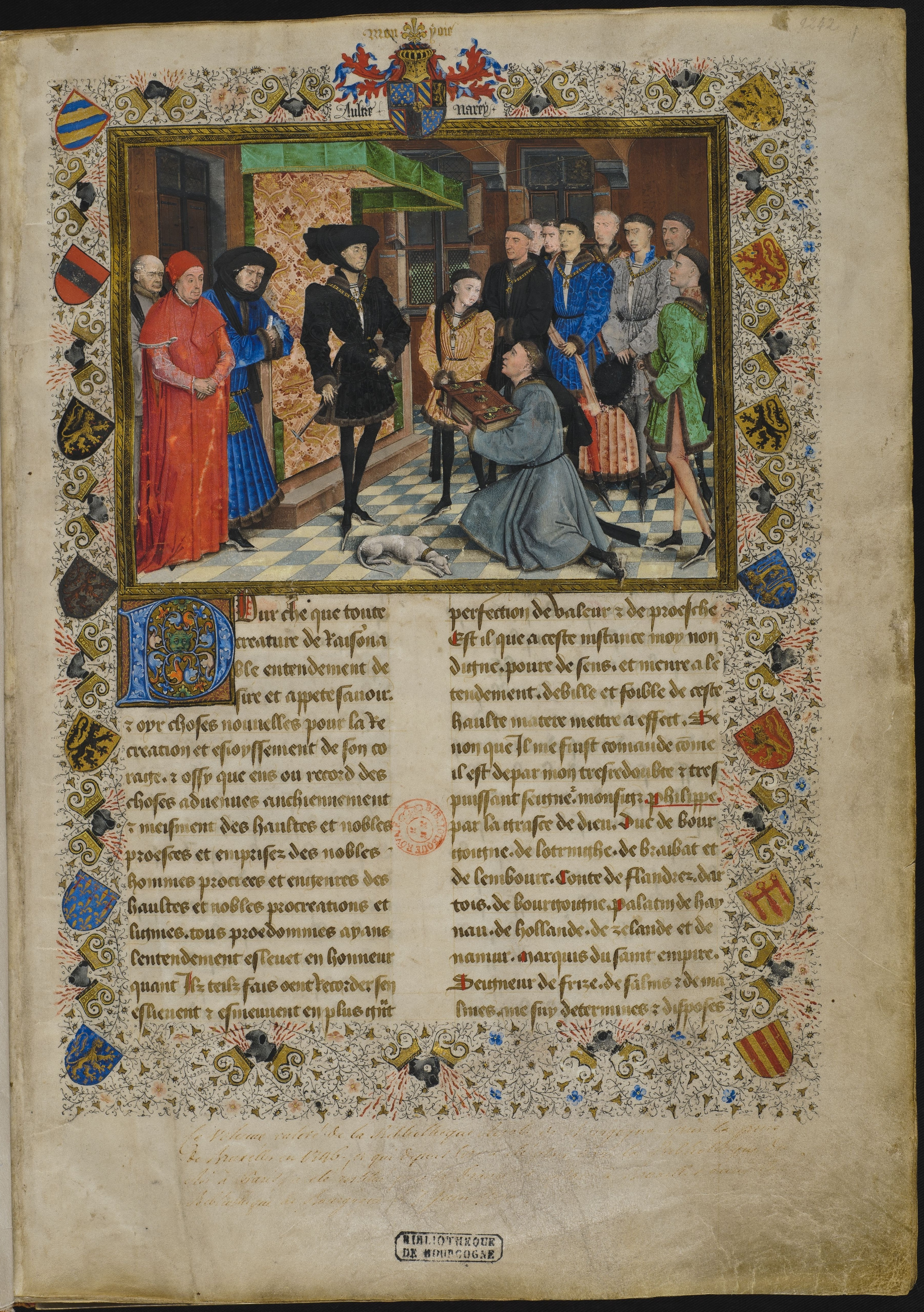
Frontispiece to the Chroniques de Hainaut held in the Royal Library of Belgium. Full page: 43.2 × 28.8 cm

Jean Wauquelin presenting his 'Chroniques de Hainaut' to Philip the Good is a presentation miniature believed to have been painted by the Early Netherlandish artist Rogier van der Weyden (or if not actually from his hand then certainly by his workshop to his designs). It decorates the frontispiece to the Chroniques de Hainaut, MS KBR.9242, Jean Wauquelin's French translation of a three-volume history of the County of Hainaut originally written in Latin by the 14th-century Franciscan historian Jacques de Guyse.

The majority, if not all, of the figures (described in the text as "Chevaliers, conseillers, et chambellans") are portraits of historical figures. The decorative border of the presentation miniature includes the arms of the various territories ruled by Philip, which he had considerably expanded, interspersed with his personal emblem of sparks being struck from a flint.

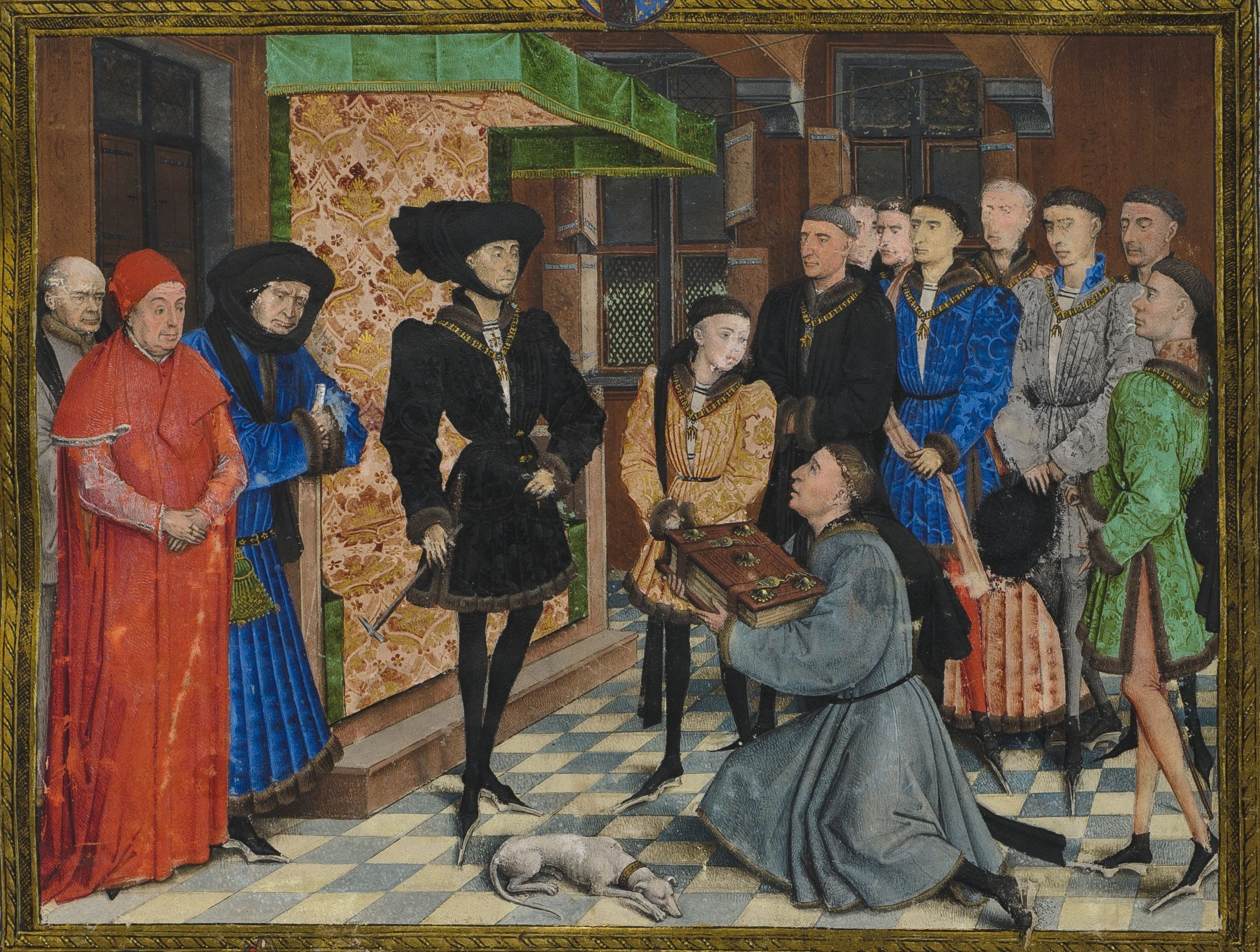
The miniature

The translation had been commissioned by Philip the Good, and the manuscript that both contains the miniature and shows it being presented was at that point the only one existing. From the court accounts the progress of the translation (though not the decoration of the manuscript) can be traced, and the miniature is presumed to date from around the time of the actual presentation to Philip in March 1448. The entire set of three volumes are now in the Royal Library of Belgium.

It is well preserved, and the only known manuscript miniature by van der Weyden.

== Chronicles of Hainaut ==
The "Chronicles of Hainaut" is an illuminated manuscript in three volumes, tracing the history of the county of Hainaut to the end of the 14th century. The text of Philip's book is a French translation made c 1446-50 by Jean Wauquelin, from the Annales historiae illustrium principum Hannoniæ, a three-volume Latin work produced by Jacques de Guyse c 1390–96. The translation was commissioned by Simon Nockart, a councilor to Philip the Good, as a means to legitimise Philip's territorial claims. It is now in the Bibliothèque royale de Belgique in Brussels. It contains ten other miniatures.

== Description ==
=== Figures ===
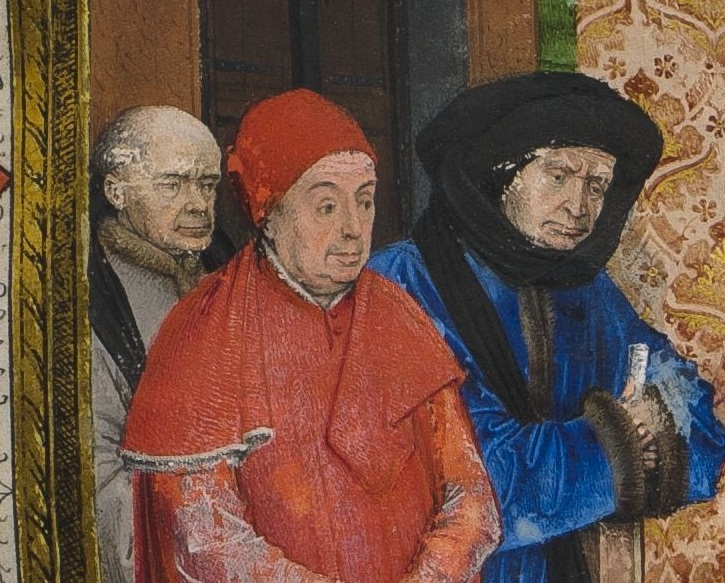
Left to right: Simon Nockart, Secretary of the province of Hainaut, Jean Chevrot, Bishop of Tournai, and Nicolas Rolin, Chancellor of the Duke of Burgundy.

The frontispiece praises the contemporary fashion at Burgundian court, which it claims is ahead even of that of the French. Broadly the miniature can be divided into three horizontal sections, with four clerics positioned to the left, two members of royalty and Wauquelin at the center, and eight advisers and courtiers to the right. The main figures are dressed in finely tailored gowns, with pipe folds extending from the shoulders, that become tightly girdled at the waist, before they spread out into the skirt. In most cases the skirts end before the knees. Most wear a bodice, which is open from the neck to waist, and worn over a white shirt. The tops of their sleeves rise unnaturally over their shoulders, most likely due to the support of small cushions (mahewters) place inside the garments.

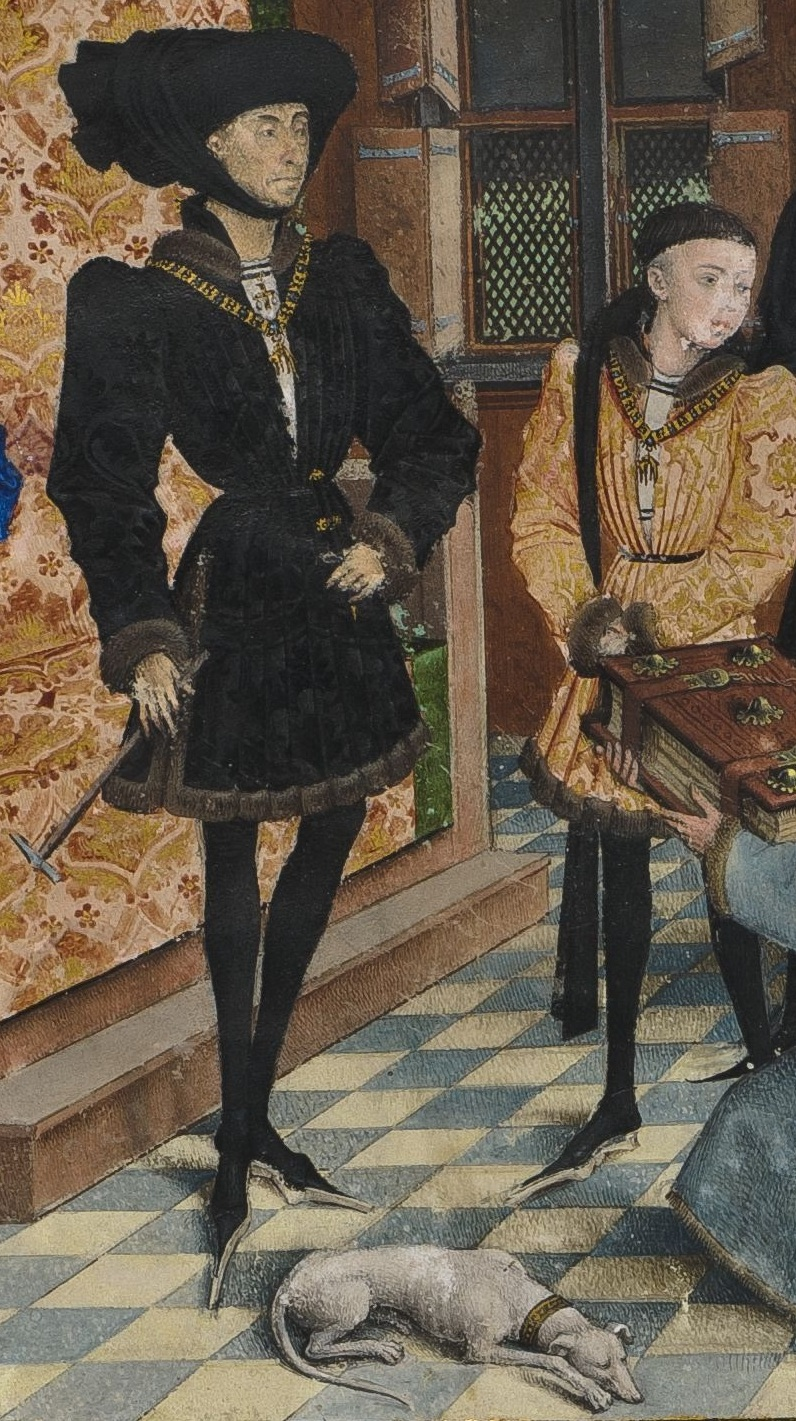
Philip the Good in black, with Charles de Charolais, the future Charles the Bold

The men's head-dress is intended to denote their social position, with the highest ranked wearing variants of the chaperon, a garment then at the peak of its popularity. Philip the Good wears a black looped chaperon, Rolin a less exuberant version; only he has sufficient status to wear his chaperon indoors in the Duke's presence. Apart from the Bishop of Tournai, standing next to Rolin, all the other men are bare-headed, even Philip's young heir, despite the fact that several of them are high-ranking intimates who, like the Duke, wear the collar of the Order of the Golden Fleece. But as far as can be seen, all have hats. The young Charles the Bold, then around 12 or 13 years old wears his patte, or strap, wrapped round the back of his neck, and the man on the extreme right, identified as Jean de Croÿ, has his bourrelet further than usual down his back, with the patte hanging from it. The man in grey seems to be carrying a different type of hat made of black fur, but all the other ones visible are also chaperons, mostly with the cornettes to the front.

Philip stands in front of his throne positioned under a golden or salmon coloured canopy or baldachin, lined with what appears to be green satin. He is, as usually in depictions of him, dressed almost entirely in black. He wears a black burlet (rolled) chaperon with the cornette wrapped around this neck. He holds a small hammer as a symbol of his authority in his left hand, and a baton of power in his right, while a dog sleeps at his feet. His tight chaussembles (leggings) end in long pouleines (the type of shoe with very long, pointed toes). His clothes are lined with brown fur, which is turned out to trim the cuffs and hem. His son Charles de Charolais stands to his right, dressed in a salmon gown, foreshadowing the crown he is due to inherit. Jean Wauquelin kneels before Philip, presenting a large book bound in brown leather; his translation of the Chroniques de Hainaut which he had completed in 1446. Van der Weyden some took artistic licence here, probably to vary the tonality of the dark colours; the surviving Chroniques bound in black satin.

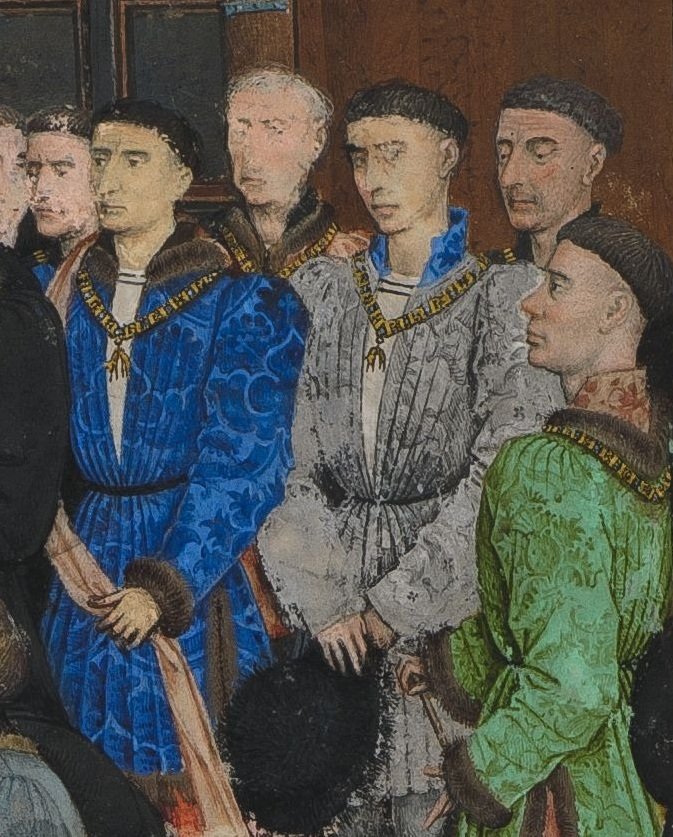
Left to right: Either Antoine de Croÿ or Anthony, bastard of Burgundy (in blue), unidentified old man (behind), unidentified man (in grey with chain), Jean de Croÿ (in green gown and chain)

Philip's preference for black is imitated by a number of the other men to the right, particularly the older nobleman at the head of the group, who is generally identified as Antoine I de Croÿ, first chamberlain of the ducal household. Most of the chaperons are black, although the man in blue has one in salmon-pink; black was having one of its earliest periods of being the most fashionable colour at the time.

The miniature bears a close resemblance to the presentation miniature by Simon Marmion for Philip's copy of the Grandes Chroniques de France, in which Philip accepts many of the same figures present in the Hainaut miniature. A book for Charles the Bold of 1468–70 includes a rather crude and simplified version of van der Weyden's scene.

=== Borders ===
The richly decorated borders of the miniature detail Philip's territorial control over large areas of Northern Europe. The top of the page show his arms, mottoes, and devices, while along the sides are the arms of the different territories under his rule. They are laid out with duchies on the left side (including Burgundy, Lotharingia and Limbourg), and counties on the right (including Flanders, Artois and Franche-Comté).

=== Condition ===
The miniature is well preserved but with some losses. There is some small amount of decay to the paint to the head of the unidentified old man behind Antoine de Croÿ, as well as to the head of the white-haired knight. Over time some of the colours have darkened, especially on some of the brighter elements of Philip's garments.

== Attribution ==
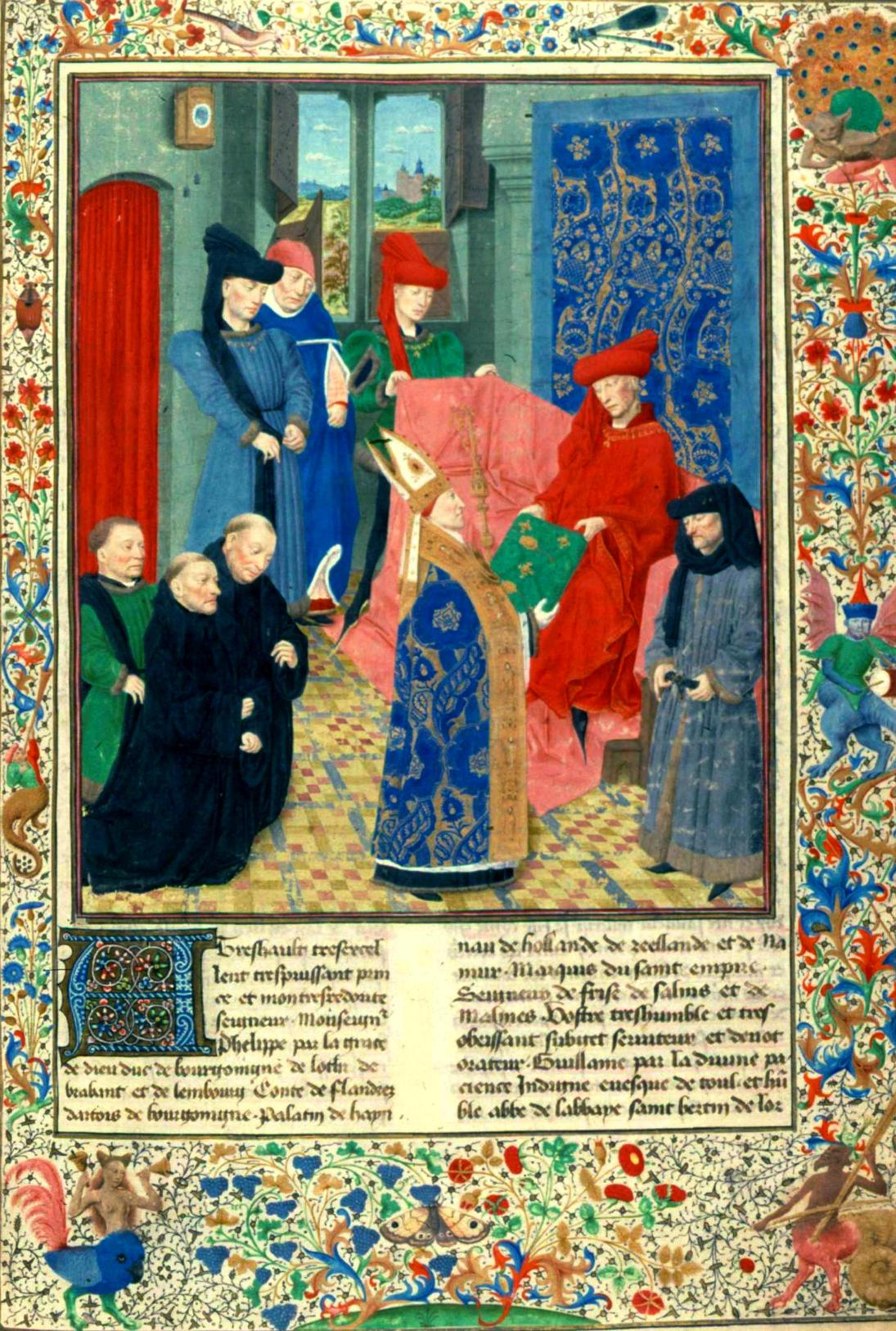
Philip the Good, with Rolin and Charles the Bold, accepts the Grandes Chroniques de France from Guillaume Fillastre on 1 January 1457

There are no extant examples of manuscript miniatures by Van der Weyden, excepting a single tapestry, all of the attributed works are panel painting. Yet in the early to mid 14th century, artists often worked in a variety of mediums. In both Tournai and Brussels, where he is known to have been active, illuminators and panel painters were part of the same guild. He studied under Robert Campin and alongside Jacques Daret, both of whom are known to have produced miniatures.

The miniature is about the same size of van der Weyden smallest panel works. The workmanship is of the very highest quality and precision. An example of the attention to detail are the several concentric contour lines added to the tail of the dozing dog, making it appear to wag. It was copied in other presentation miniatures, some showing Charles the Bold older or in adulthood.

The association with van der Weyden was first established by Gustav Friedrich Waagen and is now generally accepted by art historians. His attribution was based not only on the quality of execution, but also on the portrait evidence of some of the figures. Most of these can be identified, and among them Bishop Jean Chevrot (2nd from left), Chancellor Nicolas Rolin (3rd from left), Philip the Good (centre, 4th from left), and Charles the Bold (5th from left) appear in portraits by van der Weyden or his workshop, although in the case of Charles the Bold he appears as just an 11-year-old boy in the miniature. The group on the right probably include Anthony, bastard of Burgundy and Antoine de Croy.

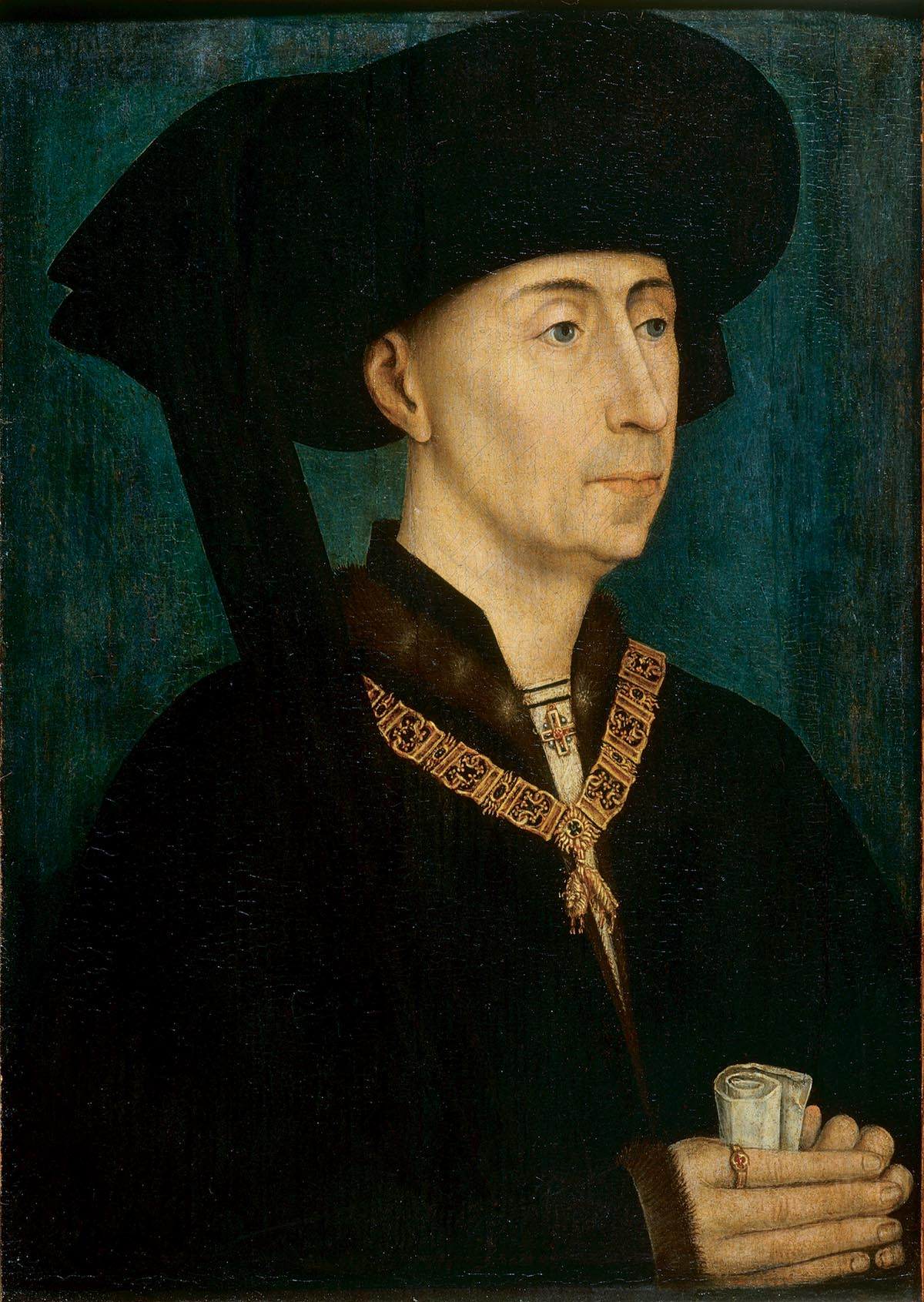
One of several copies of van der Weyden's now lost Portrait of Philip the Good

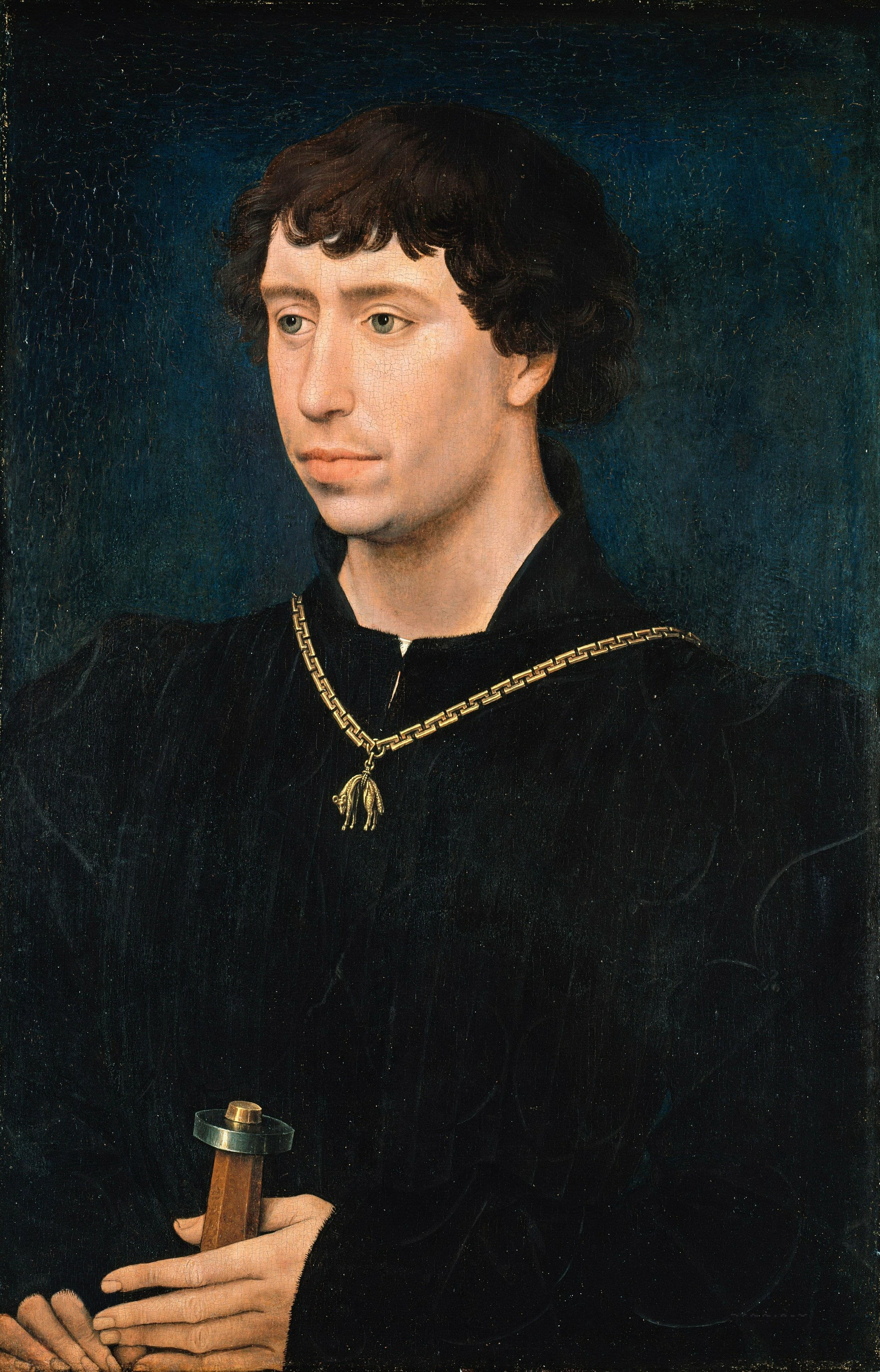
Portrait of Charles the Bold, attributed to van der Weyden's workshop

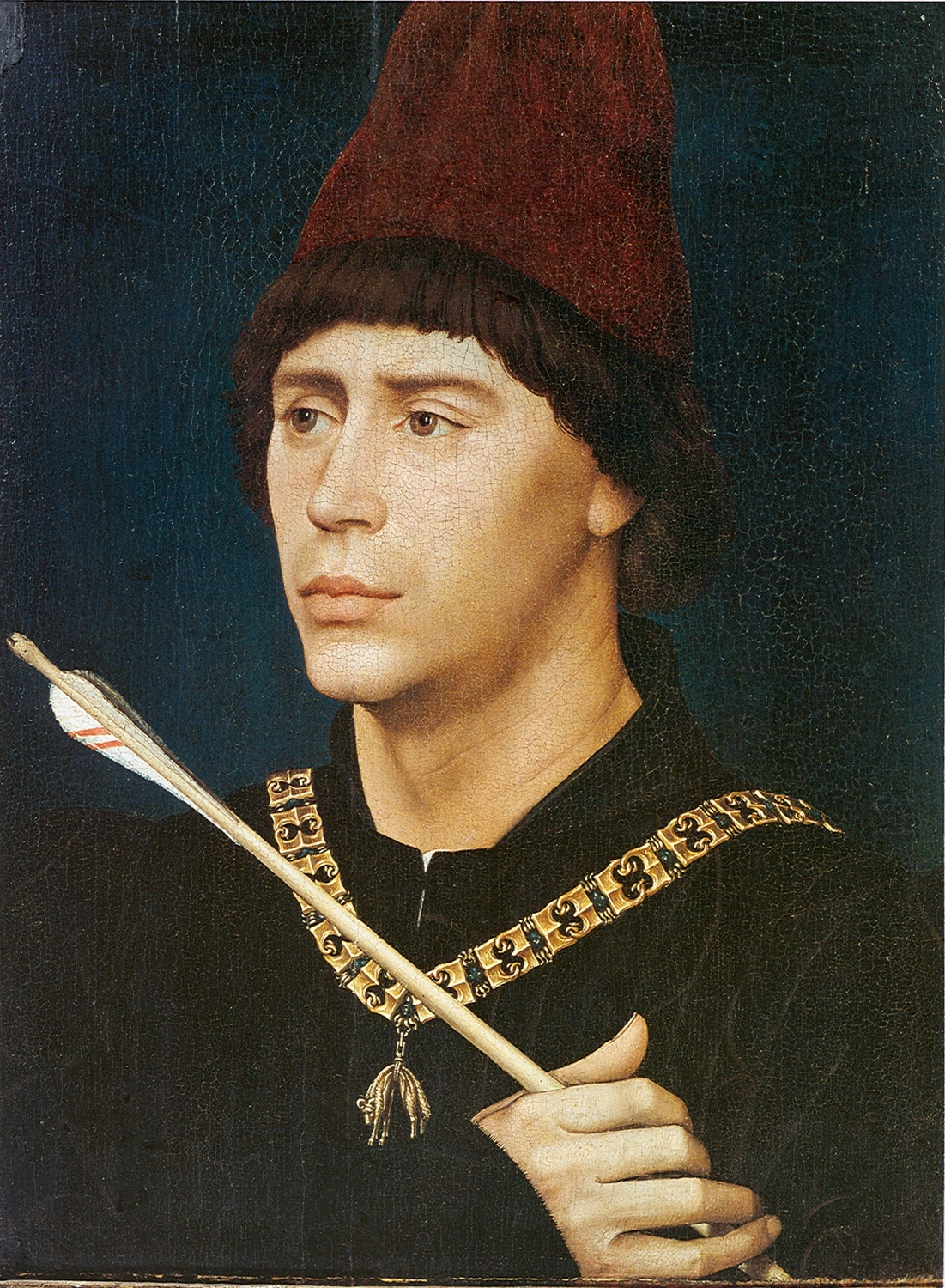
van der Weyden, Portrait of Antoine, 'Grand Bâtard' of Burgundy, c. 1460, Brussels

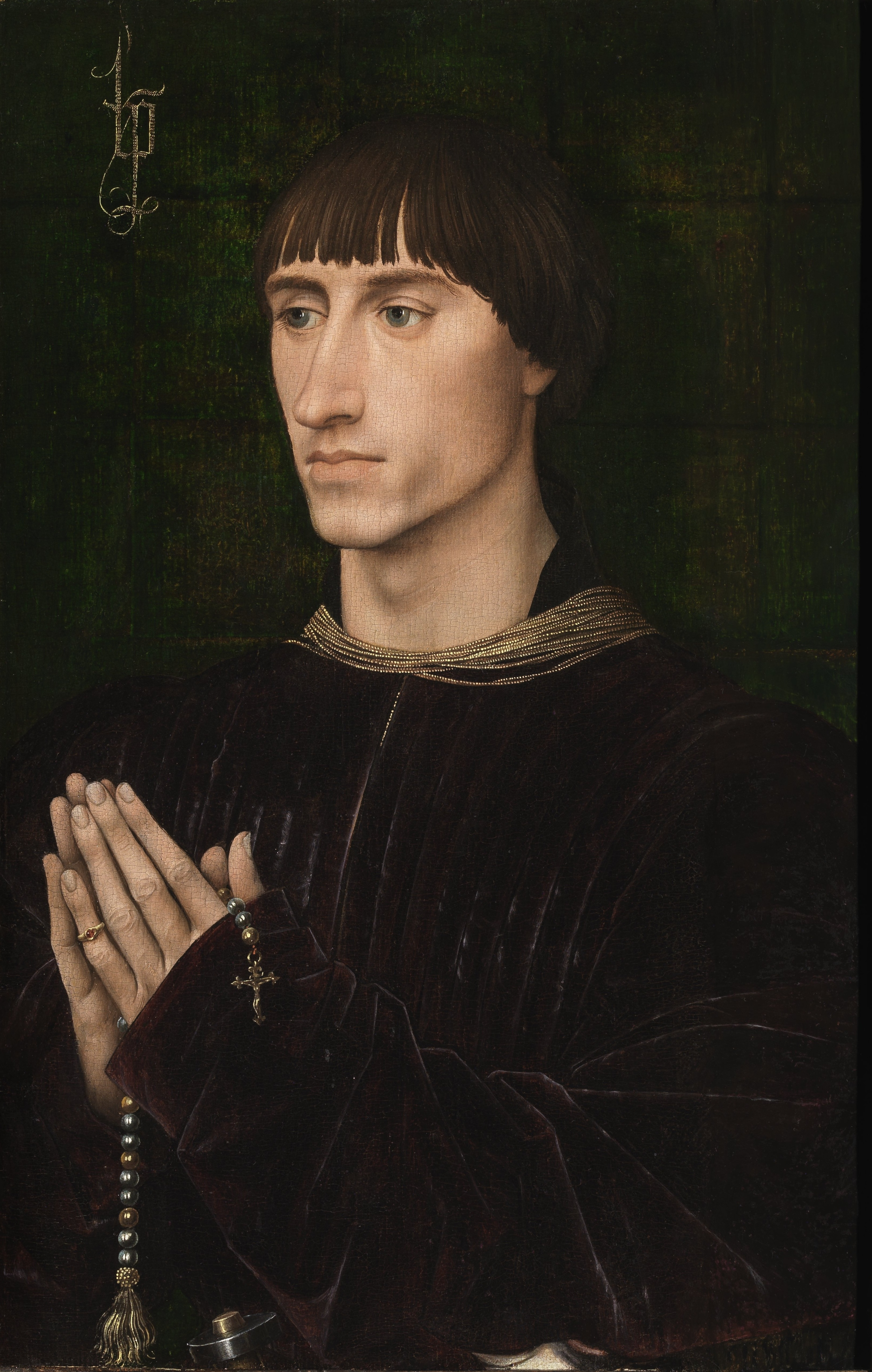
van der Weyden's Portrait of Philippe de Croÿ, 1460, Antwerp.

== See also ==
- List of works by Rogier van der Weyden
