= Chronicles of Hainaut =

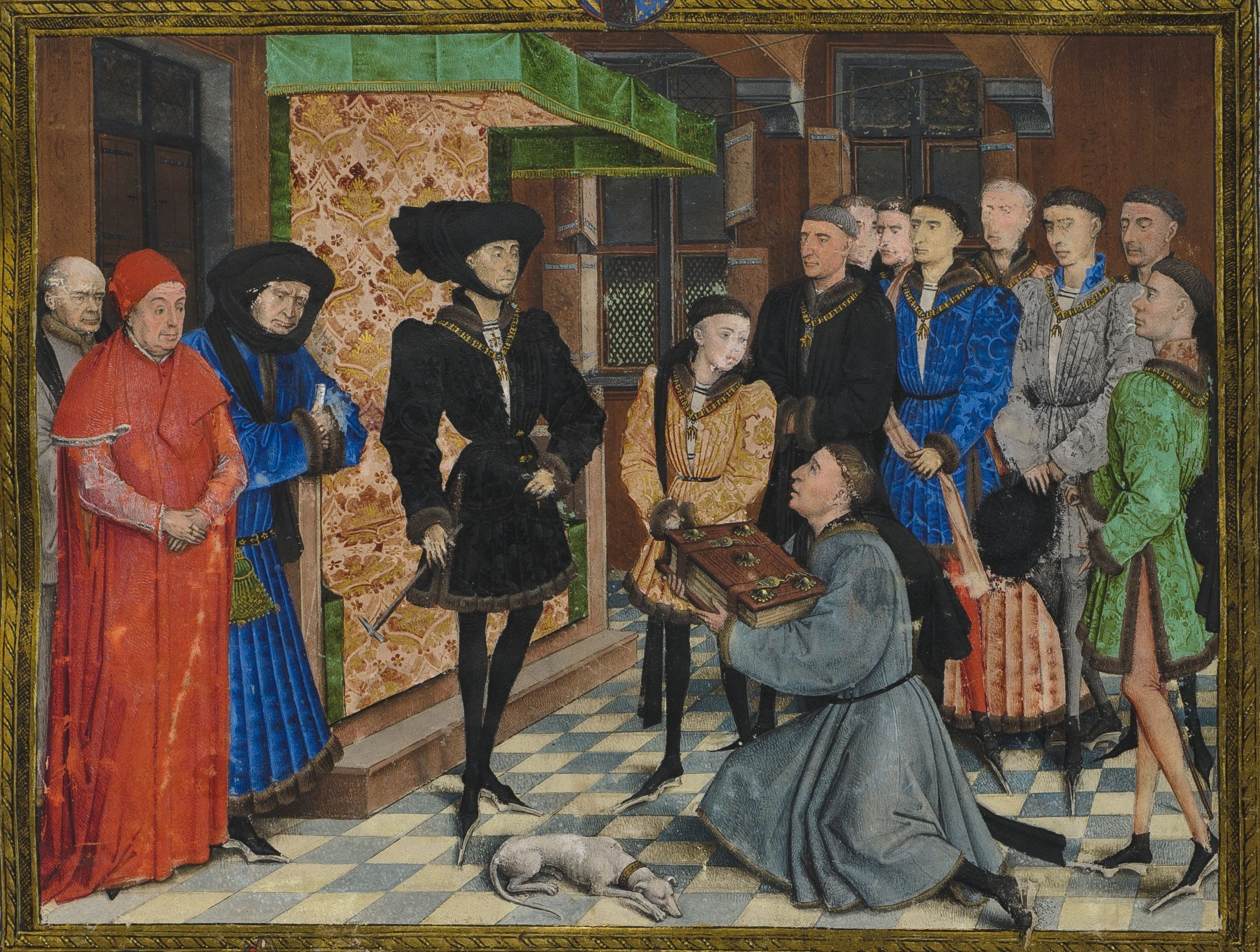
Rogier van der Weyden's Jean Wauquelin presenting his 'Chroniques de Hainaut' to Philip the Good. Frontispiece miniature of the Chronicles of Hainaut. (Royal Library of Belgium, Brussels, Manuscripts, MS. KBR.9242.

The Chronicles of Hainaut is an illuminated manuscript in three volumes, tracing the history of the county of Hainaut up to the end of the 14th century. Its text was produced around 1446-1450 by Jean Wauquelin as a French translation of Annales historiae illustrium principum Hannoniæ, a three-volume Latin work produced by Jacques de Guise around 1390-1396. It was made for Philip the Good of Burgundy and is now in the Royal Library of Belgium in Brussels.

Its frontispiece is a 1447 miniature by Rogier van der Weyden showing Waquelin kneeling to present the book to Philip. Beside Philip is his thirteen or fourteen year old son Charles the Bold. To the left, the figure in blue is chancellor Nicolas Rolin and the one in red is Jean Chevrot, bishop of Tournai. The group of people to the right are eight members of the Order of the Golden Fleece, founded by Philip in 1430.

Ten other miniatures (f.75, 175v, 267, 274v, 277, 281, 284v, 286v, 291) are attributed to the Alexandre de Wauquelin Master.

== Bibliography ==
- L. Campbell, « Rogier van der Weyden and Manuscript Illumination », in : E. Morrison et T. Kren (éds.), Flemish Manuscript Painting in Context. Recent Research, Los Angeles, The J. Paul Getty Museum, 2006, pp. 87–102.
- (in French) L. Campbell et J. Van der Stock (éd.), Rogier van der Weyden. 1400-1464. Maître des Passions, exhibition catalogue, M Louvain, 20 septembre - 6 décembre 2009, Leuven : Davidsfonds, 2009, cat. no. 9, pp. 280–283.
- (in French) Ch. van den Bergen-Pantens et al., Les Chroniques de Hainaut ou les ambitions d’un prince bourguignon, exhibition, Bruxelles, Bibliothèque royale Albert Ier, 14 avril – 27 mai 2000 : légendes des pièces exposées, KBR, ms. 9242, Bruxelles, Bibliothèque royale Albert Ier, 2000.
- (in French) D. De Vos, Rogier van der Weyden. L’œuvre complet, Paris, Hazan, 1999.
