= Brussels Coin Cabinet =

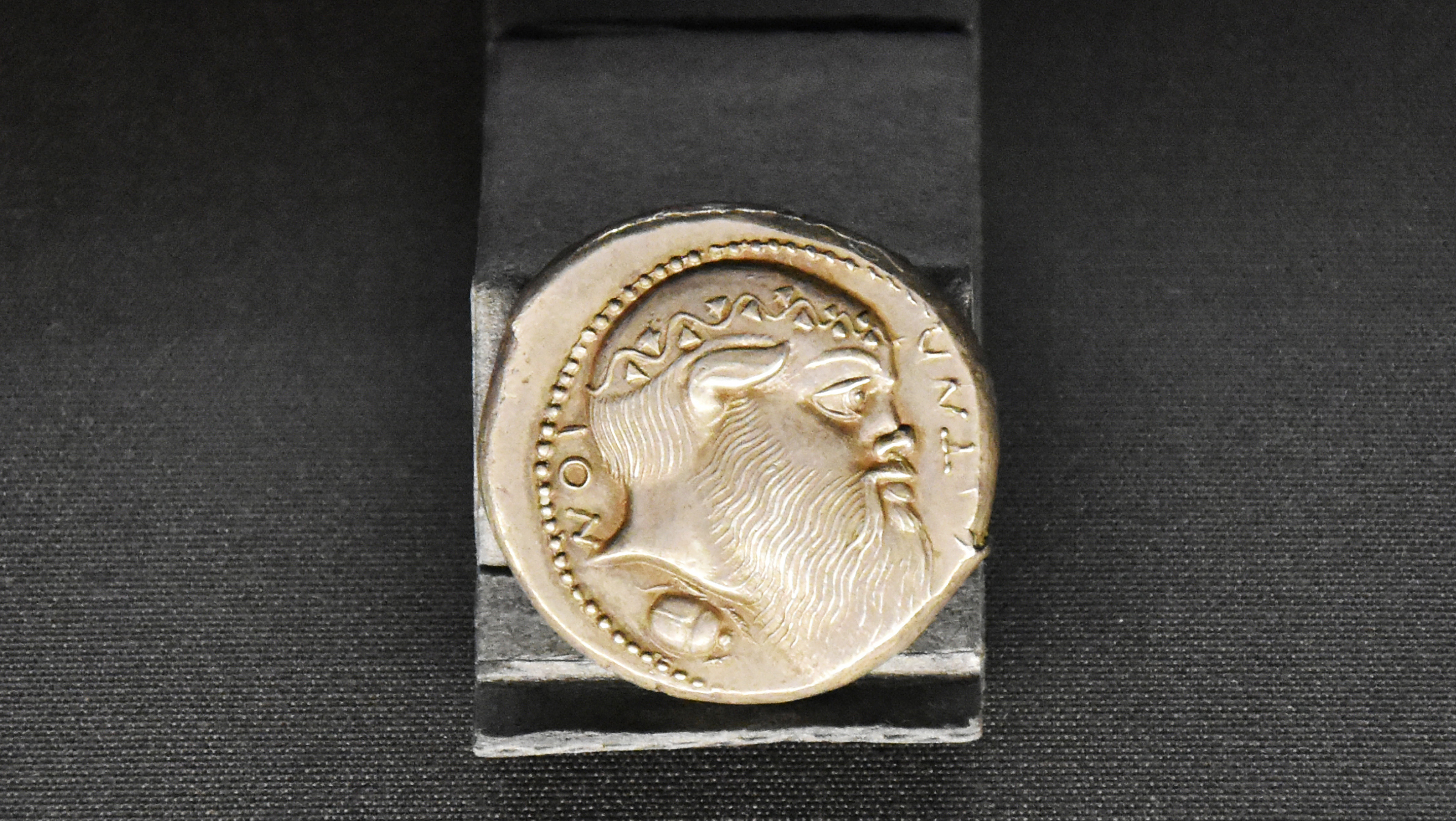
Tetradrachm of Aetna in the Coins and Medals Department of the Royal Library of Belgium

The Brussels Coin Cabinet is a public numismatics collection established on 8 August 1835 that is now the Coins and Medals Department of the Royal Library of Belgium. At its foundation it was part of the "Musée d'armes anciennes, d'armures, d'objets d'art et de numismatique". It became part of the Royal Library of Belgium three years later.

== Collections ==
Over the years purchases and gifts have expanded the size of the cabinet.

1899 the cabinet bought the collection of Albéric du Chastel. It consists of approximately 800 Greek and Roman pieces. Some of these are rare, for instance the aureus of Uranius Antoninus.

One year later it obtained its most precious gift. After the death of major collector Lucien de Hirsch, his mother gave his collection to the Belgium State. The biggest treasure of this collection is without doubt the tetradrachm of Aetna, supposedly the most valuable item in the entire field of numismatics, whatever the period or the place of striking.

In 1904 the cabinet was again enlarged with a big collection. The H. Surmont de Volsberghe collection brought the cabinet many hundreds of coins, medallions, decorations and counters.

In 1924 the Cabinet shared with the University Foundation the collection of count B. de Jonghe. Soon after this transaction, the foundation handed its part over to the cabinet.

In 1971 the National Bank of Belgium made the cabinet gatekeeper of the 'treasure of Liberchies' (hundreds of Roman aurei).

In 1976, 5,549 pieces were acquired from the collection of Dom Grégoire De Clercq.

More recent gifts are the collections of Claude Roelandt and Zéphyr Henin.
