= Portrait of Philip the Good (van der Weyden) =

Painting and copies, originally by Rogier van der Weyden

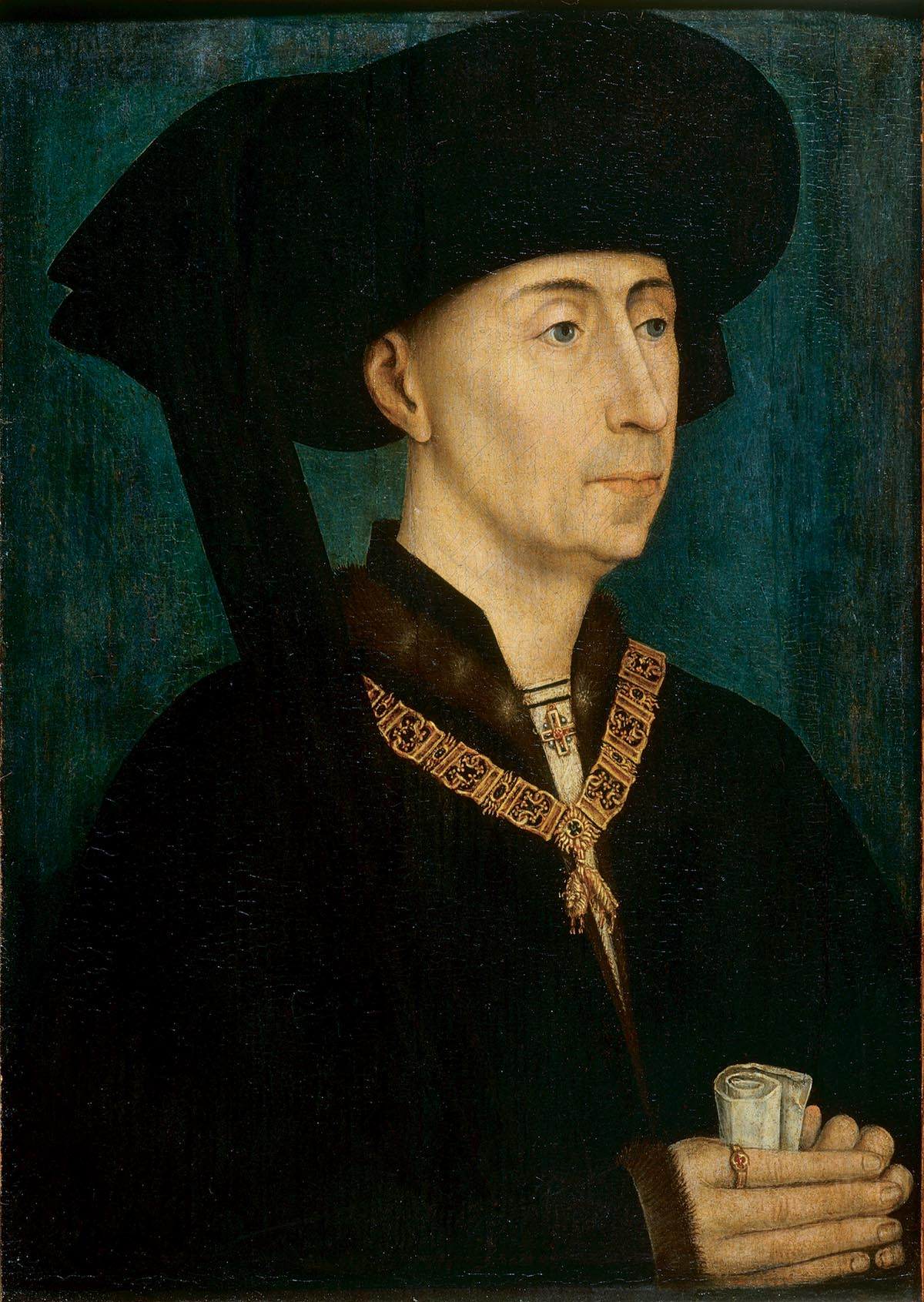
Portrait of Philip the Good, Musée des Beaux-Arts, Dijon, 31 x 23 cm

Portrait of Philip the Good is a lost oil on wood panel painting by the Early Netherlandish painter Rogier van der Weyden, dated variously from the mid 1440s to sometime after 1450.

Several versions and copies exist, including in Lille, Antwerp, London and Paris, mostly attributed to his workshop. The highest quality version is in the Musée des Beaux-Arts, Dijon. The original may have been commissioned as half of a matrimonial diptych; given his age in the painting we can assume that it would have been alongside a portrait of his third wife, Isabella of Portugal. Van der Weyden has earlier portrayed Philip in the c 1447 miniature Jean Wauquelin presenting his 'Chroniques de Hainaut' to Philip the Good.

== Description ==
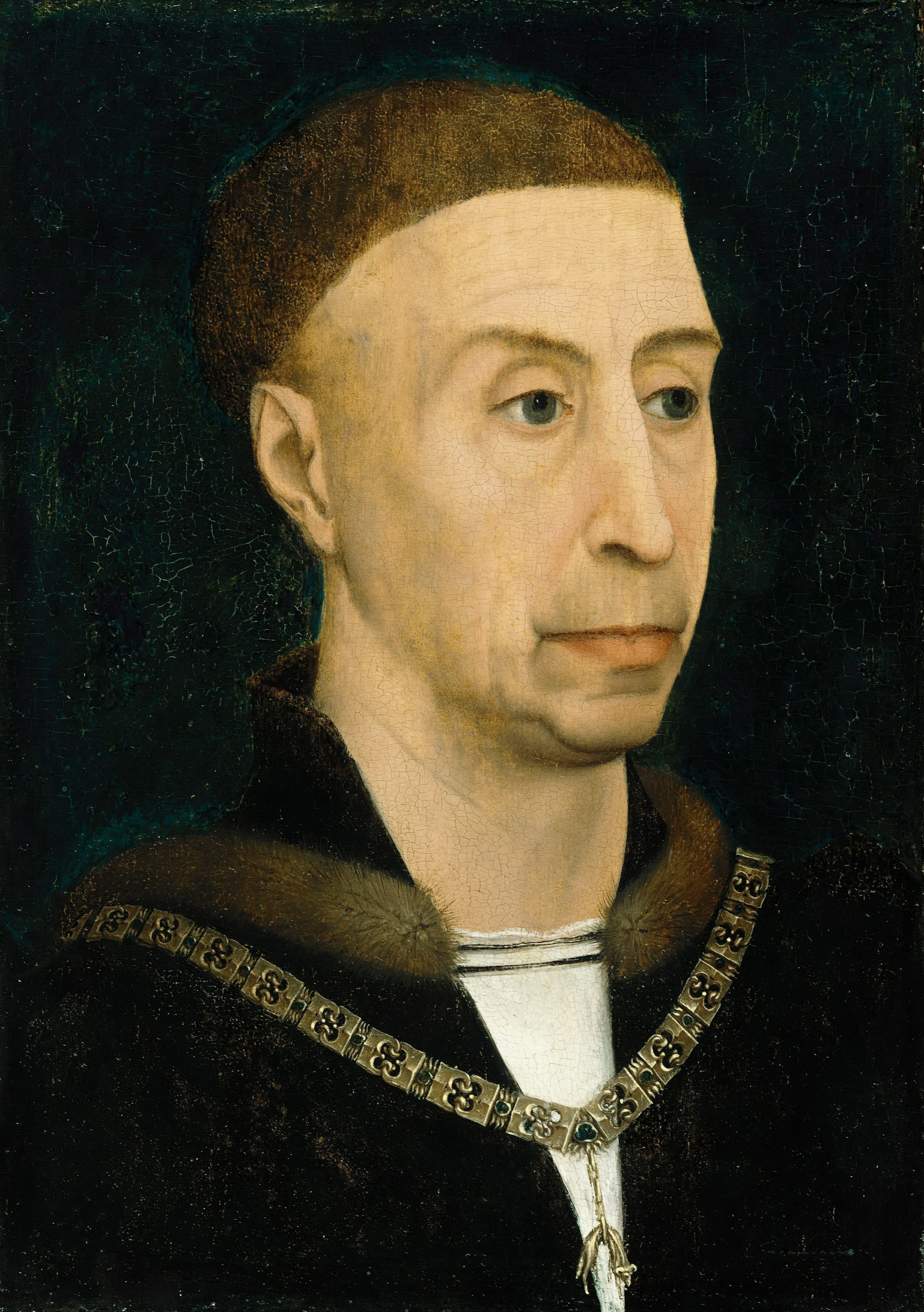
Rogier, Portrait of Philip the Good, Gemäldegalerie, Berlin. Undated but Philip seems at least 10 years younger

Philip the Good was Duke of Burgundy from 1419 until his death in 1467, and had appointed van der Weyden as his official court painter. He is pictured aged around 50 years, in three-quarter profile. As was van der Weyden's habit, the sitter's face has been elongated, even though heavy drinking had by the time taken a toll on his features, visible in his portrait in the "Recueil d'Arras". He wears a black gown and black chaperon, and a jewelled collar of firesteels in the shape of the letter "B", representing the Duchy of Burgundy, ending in the insignia of the Order of the Golden Fleece He holds a folded paper in his joined hands, which have been highly detailed by the artist.

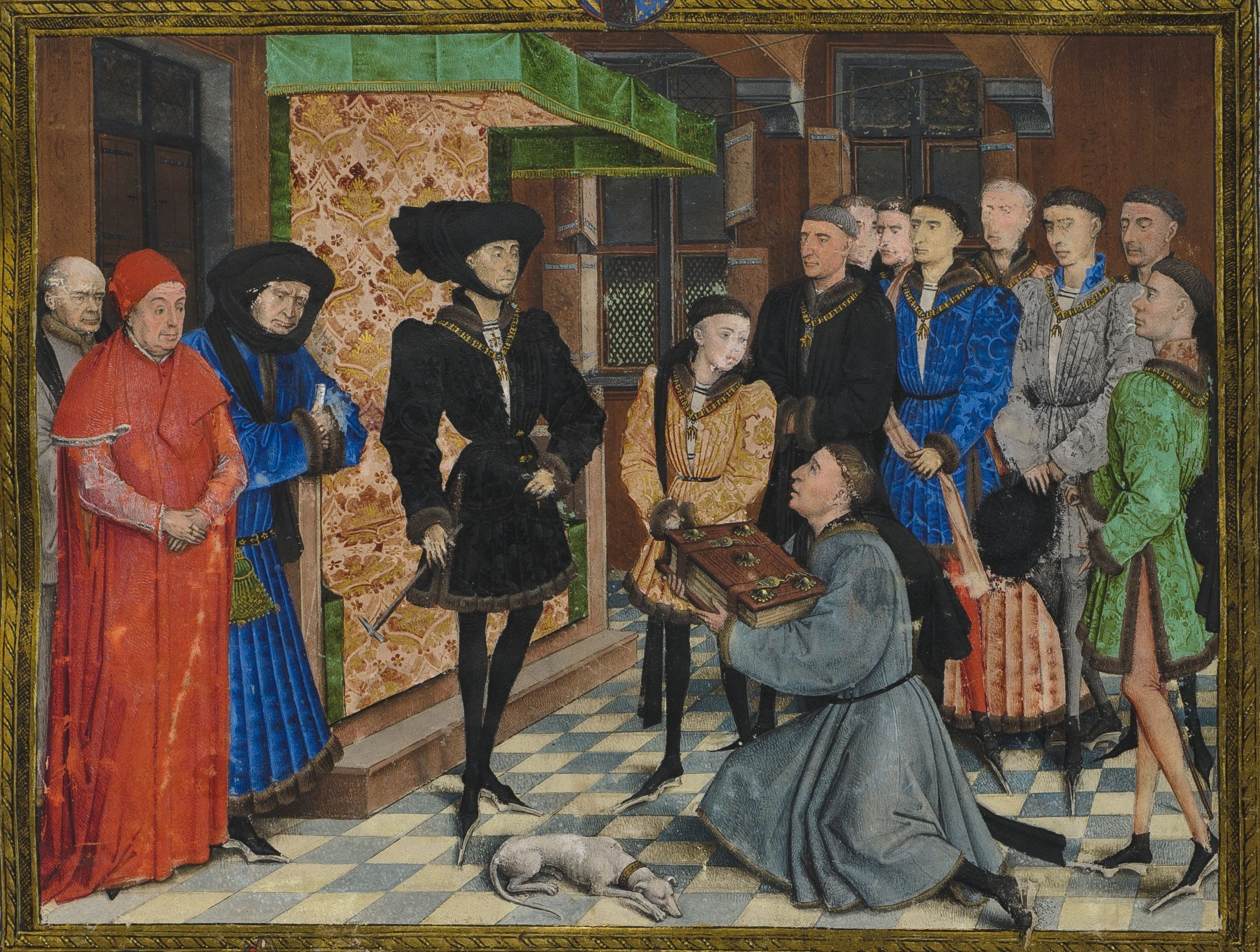
RvdW, Jean Wauquelin presenting his 'Chroniques de Hainaut' to Philip the Good

Given his stature, it is unlikely that Philip sat for the artist; it is perhalps for this reason that the portrait seems highly idealised, although his double chin is still pronounced. Art historian Lorne Campbell notes that the "Netherlanders expected paintings to be credibly naturalistic but ... veracity was not their ultimate or dominant aim." The British Royal Collection describe their version as a "stylised, emotionless and idealised image of the ruler".

The portrait served as the basis for many later depictions of Philip, though not all adhered to Van der Weyden's idealised version; especially since the 17th century, he has been shown as thicker set, aligning with contemporary written descriptions.

== See also ==
- List of works by Rogier van der Weyden

== Sources ==
- Campbell, Lorne. Van der Weyden. London: Chaucer Press, 2004. ISBN 1-904449-24-7
- Campbell, Lorne. The Early Flemish Pictures in the Collection of Her Majesty the Queen, Cambridge. 1985
- Gay, Richard; Kren, Thomas. In: "Illuminating the Renaissance – The Triumph of Flemish Manuscript Painting in Europe". LA: Getty Museum, 2003, ISBN 978-1-903973-28-8
- Soudavar, Abolala. Decoding Old Masters: Patrons, Princes and Enigmatic Paintings of the 15th Century. I.B.Tauris, 2008. ISBN 978-1-84511-658-3
