= Marc Danval =

Belgian journalist and author (1937–2022)

- Born: Marc Sevenants; 18 February 1937; Ixelles, Brussels, Belgium
- Died: 22 September 2022 (aged 85)
- Occupation(s): Journalist, Author

Marc Sevenants (18 February 1937 – 22 September 2022), better known by the pseudonym of Marc Danval, was a Belgian journalist, author, artist and columnist, who wrote about Belgian food and jazz. In his early career he also worked as an actor.

== Biography ==
Born Marc Sevenants, Marc Danval was respectively the son and the grandson of the pianists, composers and teachers at the Royal Conservatory of Brussels, Fernand (1901–1992) and José Sevenants (1868–1946). After beginning his career as an actor in the late 1950s, he changed his name to the stage name Danval - a reference to his mother Marthe Danvoie's maiden name - in order to avoid confusion with his cousin, Maurice Sevenants, who was also interested in becoming actor. Danval performed in many Brussels theatres, including the Royal Park Theatre and the Théâtre royal des Galeries before ending his career in 1961.

During those same years, Danval also started working as a jazz columnist. He began his radio career during his military service in 1958, presenting several special broadcasts for troops. In the 1960s he began presenting jazz programmes at RTBF (Belgian Radio and Television) and Radio Luxembourg. Latterly he was best known as the producer and host of the RTBF program La troisième oreille which presents rare 78, 45 and 33 rpm recordings. He also worked as journalist in the specialized and general press, and regularly hosted jazz concerts in Belgium and abroad.

Besides his regular columns, Marc Danval was the author of poetry (Parmi moi seul, a performance called Les poètes du jazz), biographies of Sacha Guitry, Robert Goffin and Toots Thielemans, and articles for the Dictionnaire du jazz à Bruxelles et en Wallonie.

During his career, Danval’s reputation in the jazz world allowed him to meet renowned musicians including Louis Armstrong, Miles Davis, John Coltrane and Chet Baker. These encounters are evoked in his poetry collection Parmi moi seul.

In 2006 the Société belge des auteurs, compositeurs et éditeurs (SABAM) awarded Danval the “Django d’Or” for his leading role in Belgium’s jazz scene.

== Marc Danval Collection ==
Over the course of his career, Marc Danval developed a large collection of recordings, particularly rich in Belgian jazz. He acquired his first 78 RPM recording at the age of nine. It was a cover of Boogie Woogie by Pinetop Smith and of Rempart du Sud by Ray Bauduc and Bob Haggart performed by Stan Brenders, a striking figure of Belgian jazz and jazz band leader of Institut National de Radiodiffusion.

In 2010, thanks to the support of the Friends of the Royal Library of Belgium, the Music Division of the Royal Library of Belgium acquired the collection. The acquisition was an important development for the Music Division and a considerable enrichment of its collections of non-classical music.

The Danval Collection holds 12,000 78, 45 and 33 RPM recordings ranging from jazz, to folk music, to French and English-language popular songs, film music, and variety shows. It also contains some 2,000 illustrated scores from the late 19th century to the 1950s, some of which feature artworks signed by Magritte, De Greef, Henri-Valéry Vander Poorten and Jean-Dominique Van Caulaert. The Danval collection also holds over 800 works on music, 3,000 photographs (most of them signed) and 500 posters.

== Bibliography ==
- Le règne de Sacha Guitry, biography, Pierre De Méyère, Brussels, 1971
- Bon appétit Bruxelles, gastronomy, Collet, Brussels, 1982
- Parmi moi seul, poetry, Saint-Germain-des-Prés, Paris, 1983
- Les poètes du jazz, theatre, Brussels, on 5 February 1985, created by the Ivan Baudouin-Lesly Burton company, with Lesly Burton, the pianist Charles Loos and the author
- Cuisine traditionnelle en Hainaut, Libro-Sciences, 1990
- L'énigme résolue de Verlaine à la Trappe de Forges-lez-Chimay, C.G.R.I., 1996
- L'insaisissable Robert Goffin, biography, Quorum, 1998
- Toots Thielemans, biography, Racine, 2006
- Robert Goffin, avocat, poète et homme de jazz, Le Carré Gomand, 2014
- Histoire du jazz en Belgique, Avant-Propos, 2014

== Prizes awarded ==
- Plume d'Or de la Gastronomie (The Golden Plume of Gastronomy) in 1995
- The Golden Django for its contribution to the jazz scene in Belgium in 2006
