= Royal Library of Belgium =

Belgium national library located in Brussels

- Koninklijke Bibliotheek van België (Dutch); Bibliothèque royale de Belgique (French); Königliche Bibliothek Belgiens (German)

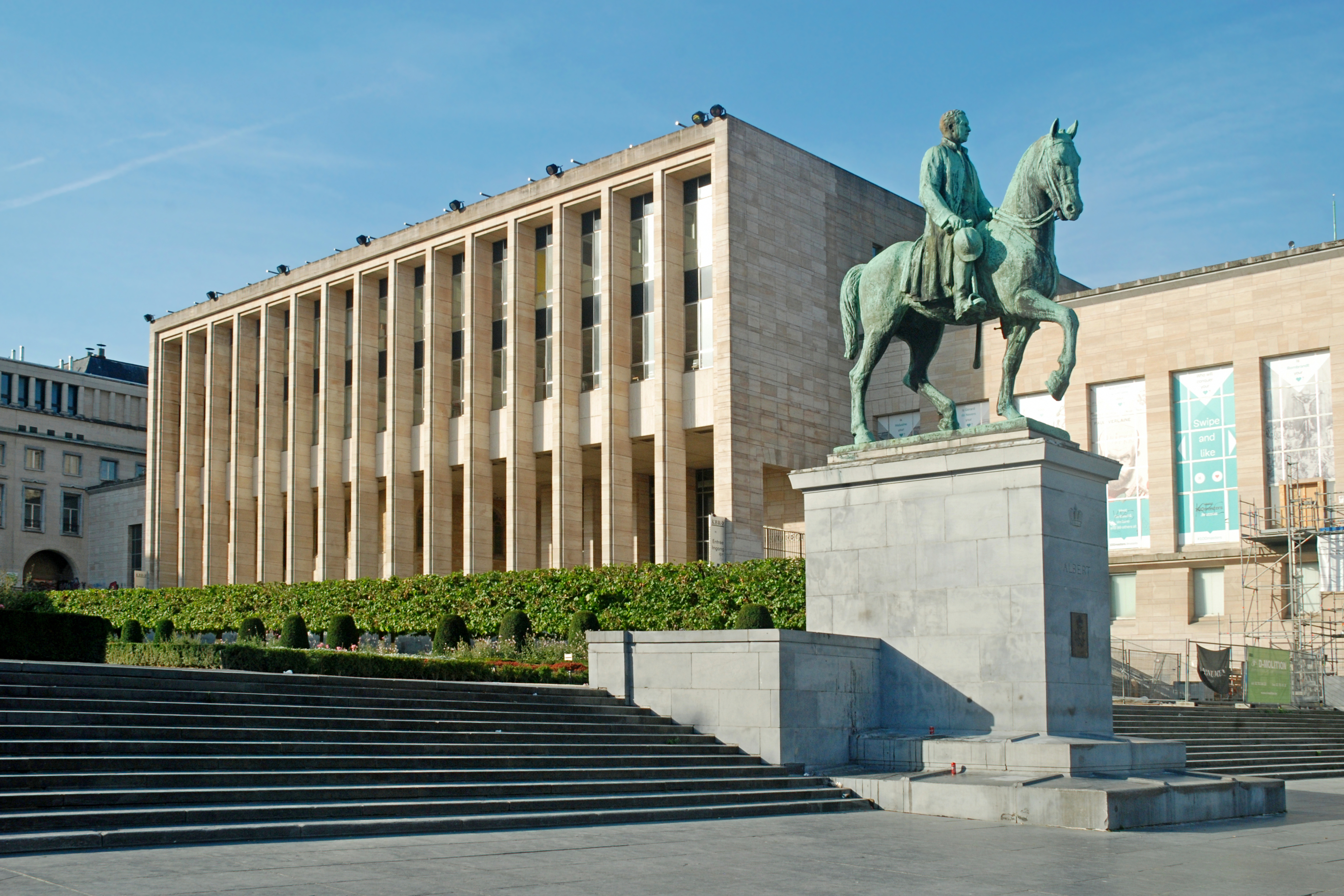
- The Royal Library of Belgium (KBR) and the equestrian statue of Albert I
- 50°50′40″N 4°21′23″E
- Location: Boulevard de l'Empereur / Keizerslaan 4, 1000 City of Brussels, Brussels-Capital Region, Belgium
- Type: National library
- Established: 12 April 1559; 467 years ago (Royal Library of the Low Countries); 19 June 1837; 189 years ago (Royal Library of Belgium)

Collection
- Size: 6 million volumes
- Legal deposit: Yes

Other information
- Website: www.kbr.be/en

The Royal Library of Belgium (Dutch: Koninklijke Bibliotheek van België [ˈkoːnɪŋkləkə ˌbiblijoːˈteːk fɑm ˈbɛlɣijə]; French: Bibliothèque royale de Belgique [biblijɔtɛk ʁwajal də bɛlʒik]; German: Königliche Bibliothek Belgiens [ˈkøːnɪklɪçə biblioˈteːk ˈbɛlɡiəns], abbreviated KBR and sometimes nicknamed Albertine in French or Albertina in Dutch) is the national library of Belgium. The institution owns several collections of historical importance, like the Library of the Dukes of Burgundy, and is the depository for all books ever published in Belgium or abroad by Belgian authors.

The library's history goes back to the age of the Dukes of Burgundy in the 15th century. In 1559, King Philip II of Spain founded the Royal Library of the Low Countries at the Palace of Coudenberg. In 1837, the Royal Library of Belgium was formally established. In the second half of the 20th century, the current building was constructed on the Mont des Arts/Kunstberg in central Brussels, near the Central Station.

There are four million bound volumes in the Royal Library, including a rare book collection numbering 45,000 works. The library has more than 750,000 prints, drawings and photographs, 150,000 maps and plans, and more than 250,000 objects, from coins to scales to monetary weights. The library also houses the Center for American Studies.

The Royal Library is open for reference only. Patrons must be at least eighteen years of age and must pay an annual membership fee.

== History ==
The origins of the library lie in the Library of the Dukes of Burgundy, created in the 15th century by the Burgundians. By the time of Philip the Good's death in 1467, this library housed approximately 900 manuscripts, making it one of the most prestigious collections in Europe. The illuminated manuscripts from this period included works by notable Flemish miniaturists such as Simon Marmion and the Master of Mary of Burgundy. While some of these manuscripts traveled with the itinerant dukes, the majority remained in the library of the Palace of Coudenberg in Brussels.

After the death of Charles the Bold in 1477, the ducal library passed to his descendants, but the collection faced significant challenges. Over time, the library suffered from neglect, looting, and theft. On 12 April 1559, Philip II of Spain consolidated all manuscripts at the Palace of Coudenberg, officially founding the Royal Library of the Low Countries, the direct predecessor of KBR. The ducal library, thus, forms the core of the current collection at KBR.

In 1731, a fire destroyed the Palace of Coudenberg, where the manuscript collection was kept. Many valuable manuscripts were thrown out of the windows by servants in an attempt to save them, but several were lost. After the fire, the manuscripts were moved to the ground floor of the palace's large chapel, which had been spared from the flames.

During the French occupation of Brussels in 1746, about half of the Burgundian manuscripts were transferred to Paris. Although most volumes returned in 1770, the peaceful period that followed was short-lived. In 1794, during the French Revolution, the French Republic again took a large portion of the manuscripts. After Napoleon's defeat, the Congress of Vienna in 1815 saw the return of most manuscripts to Brussels. However, some remained in Paris, while additional works were added to the collection, many of which were not originally part of the Library of the Dukes of Burgundy.

In 1827, a fire struck the Palace of Charles of Lorraine, where the library had been relocated. While the manuscripts were unharmed, the extinguishing water caused irreparable damage to dozens of leather and parchment bindings.

On 19 June 1837, following Belgian independence, the Royal Library of Belgium was formally established, consolidating the collections. That same year, the library acquired the Charles Van Hulthem collection, which added 70,000 volumes to its holdings. Public access to the library began on 21 May 1839, when it opened in the Palace of National Industry, part of the Palace of Charles of Lorraine complex. During this period, the library's collection grew steadily, preserving rare manuscripts such as the Chronicles of Hainaut and lavish Books of Hours.

As the library's collection expanded, new facilities were needed. Between 1878 and 1881, new wings were constructed. In 1935, the government decided to construct a new building in memory of King Albert I. Designed by architect Maurice Houyoux, construction began in 1954, and the Royal Library Albert I was inaugurated on 17 February 1969.

In 2019, the library was rebranded as KBR to reflect its modern role as Belgium's national library. The following year, the KBR Museum opened, showcasing the historic Library of the Dukes of Burgundy as a permanent exhibit. Today, KBR continues to serve as a hub for research and cultural heritage, housing millions of manuscripts, books, maps, and digital records.

In March 2026, a panoramic glass lift was inaugurated, providing visitors with improved access to the library's upper levels and the rooftop terrace.

== Collection ==
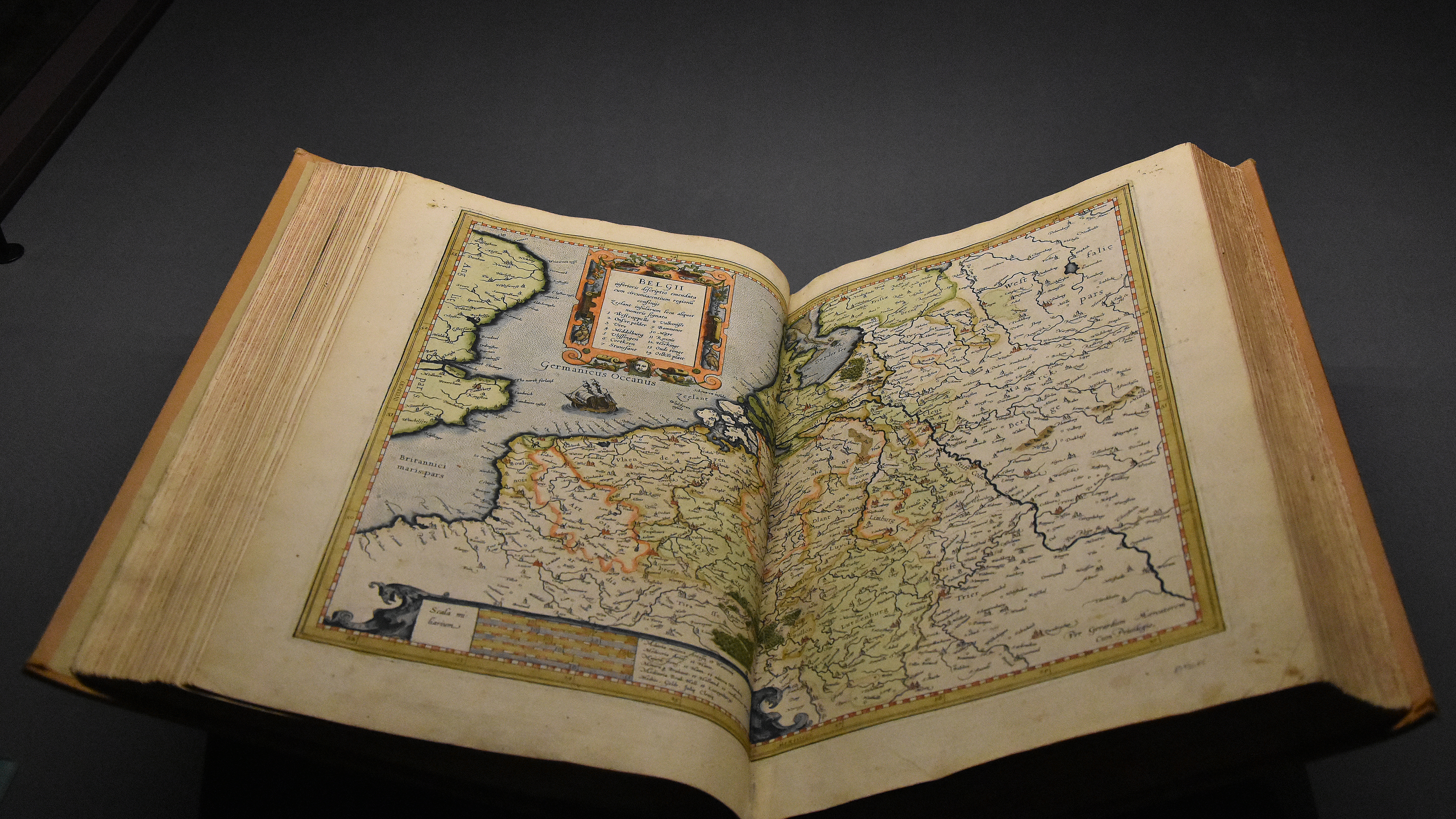
The library's copy of the 1595 atlas of Gerardus Mercator

With more than 6 million items on over 150 km (93 mi) of bookshelves, the Royal Library of Belgium is the biggest library in the country. It contains: 4,600,000 modern printed books; 21,500 magazines; 150,000 maps; 32,000 manuscripts; 300,000 early printed materials; 750,000 prints, drawings and photographs; 9,200 microfilms; and 50,000 long playing records.

The library has six special divisions, namely the Coins & Medals, Manuscripts & Rare Books, Maps & Plans, Music, Newspapers & Contemporary Media, and Prints & Drawings Departments. The initial basis of the collections were the library of the bibliophile Charles van Hulthem, acquired in 1837, and the library of the City of Brussels, acquired in 1842, which had come to include large parts of the former Royal Library of the Low Countries (founded in 1559). This coin collection holds one of the most valuable coins in the field of numismatics, a 5th-century Sicilian tetradrachm.

The library also houses the Center for American Studies, an American Studies collection of 30,000 books in open stacks, as well as U.S. newspapers and databases.

== Prints & Drawings Department ==
KBR's print room holds the largest collection of prints and drawings in Belgium. With more than 750,000 works on paper, the collection is among the ten greatest print rooms in the world (see List of museums with major collections of European prints and drawings). Its exhaustive collection of Northern European prints is particularly esteemed and includes work by major printmakers, such as Albrecht Dürer, Pieter Bruegel the Elder, Anthony van Dyck and Rembrandt. Among its large collection of drawings are highlights by major Netherlandish artists such as Pieter Bruegel the Elder, Joris Hoefnagel, Hendrick Goltzius, Peter Paul Rubens and Jacob Jordaens. The department also includes important work by Belgian artists, most notably among them Félicien Rops, Fernand Khnopff, James Ensor, Léon Spilliaert and Rik Wouters.

Furthermore, KBR's print room has a significant ensemble of Japanese ukiyo-e, including the single copy of Sharaku's Actor Iwai Hanshirō IV in the role of Otoma, and Congolese watercolours from the first half of the 20th century. In addition to the Old Master and Modern prints and drawings, the collection boasts large ensembles of topographical views, portrait prints, documentary photography, posters, postcards and other printed ephemera, including but not limited to ex-libris, playing cards, wallpaper, lottery tickets and catchpenny prints.

KBR's chalcography, established in 1932 as an independent division, is nowadays part of the print room. The chalcography is a workshop where the art of printmaking is practiced, as well as a division that collects historical printing matrices, such as copper plates and wood blocks. Together with the chalcographies of the Musée du Louvre in Paris, the Real Academia de Bellas Artes de San Fernando in Madrid and the Istituto Nazionale per la Grafica in Rome, this is one of the four surviving national chalcographies in the world. The chalcotheque in Brussels currently has more than 9,000 printing matrices from the 15th century to the present day. Among the highlights is the original copper plate of Claude Mellan's Face of Christ (1649), famously engraved in a single spiral movement.

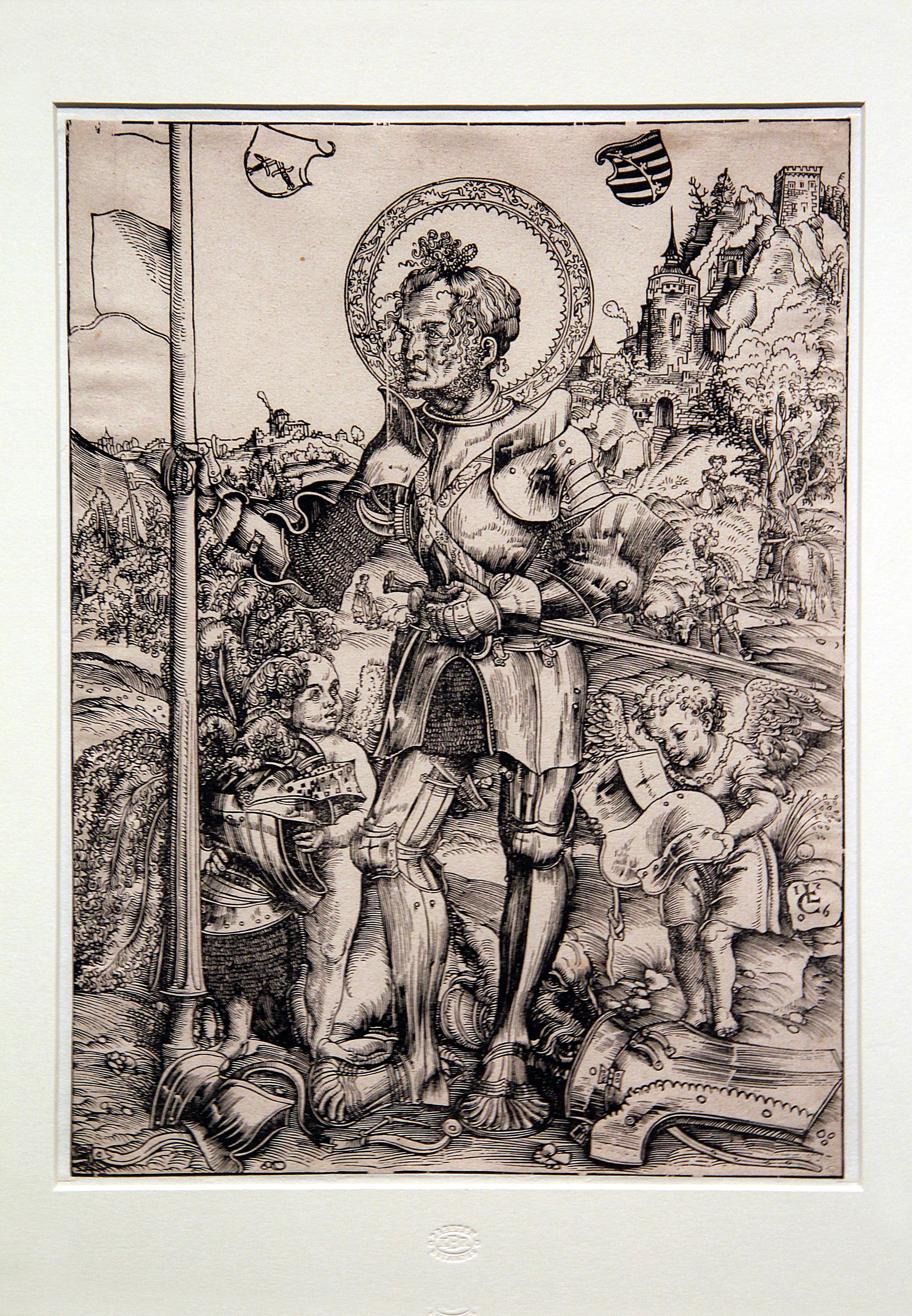
Saint George leaning on his spear by Lucas Cranach the Elder (1506)

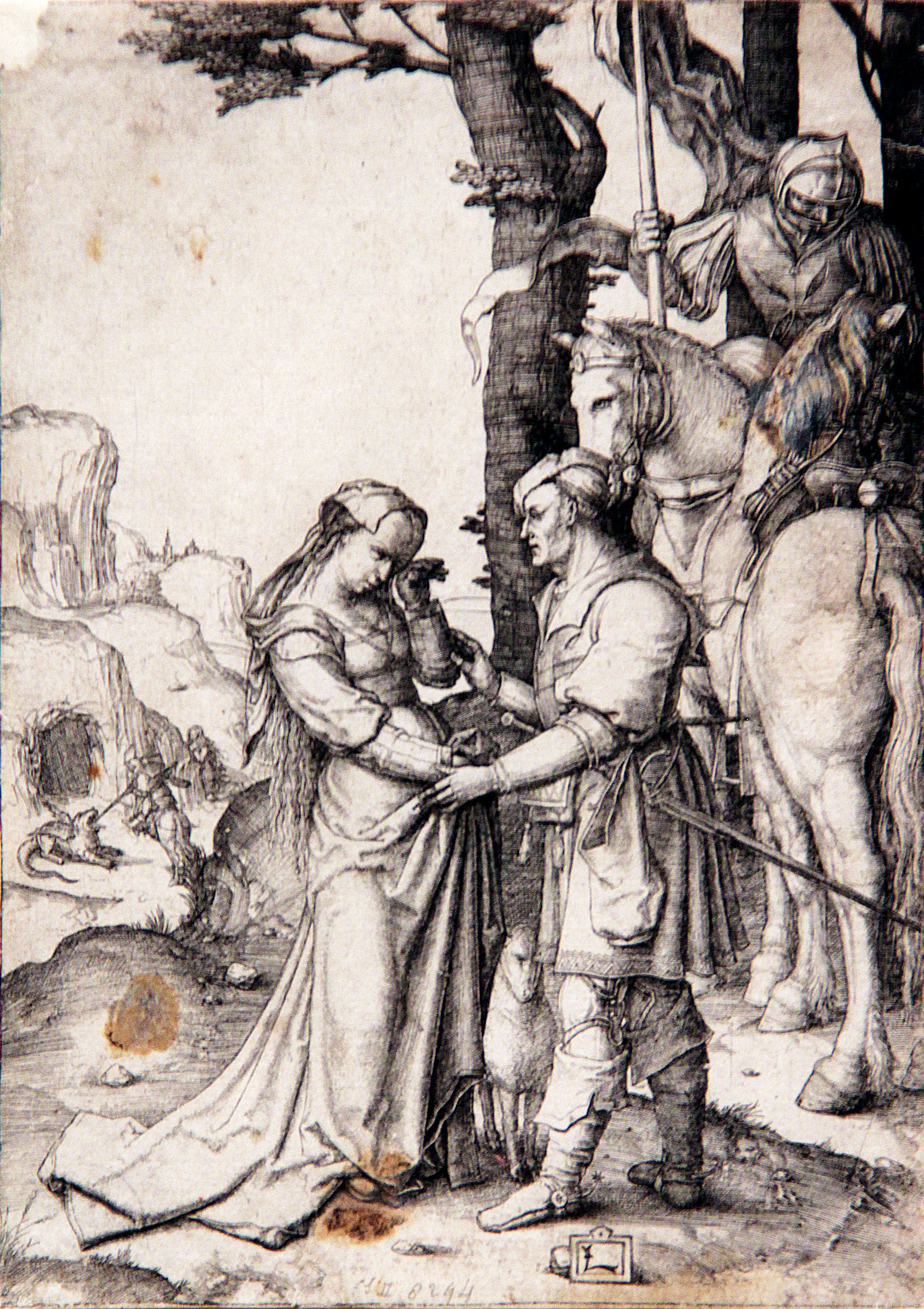
Saint George freeing the Princess by Lucas van Leyden (1508)

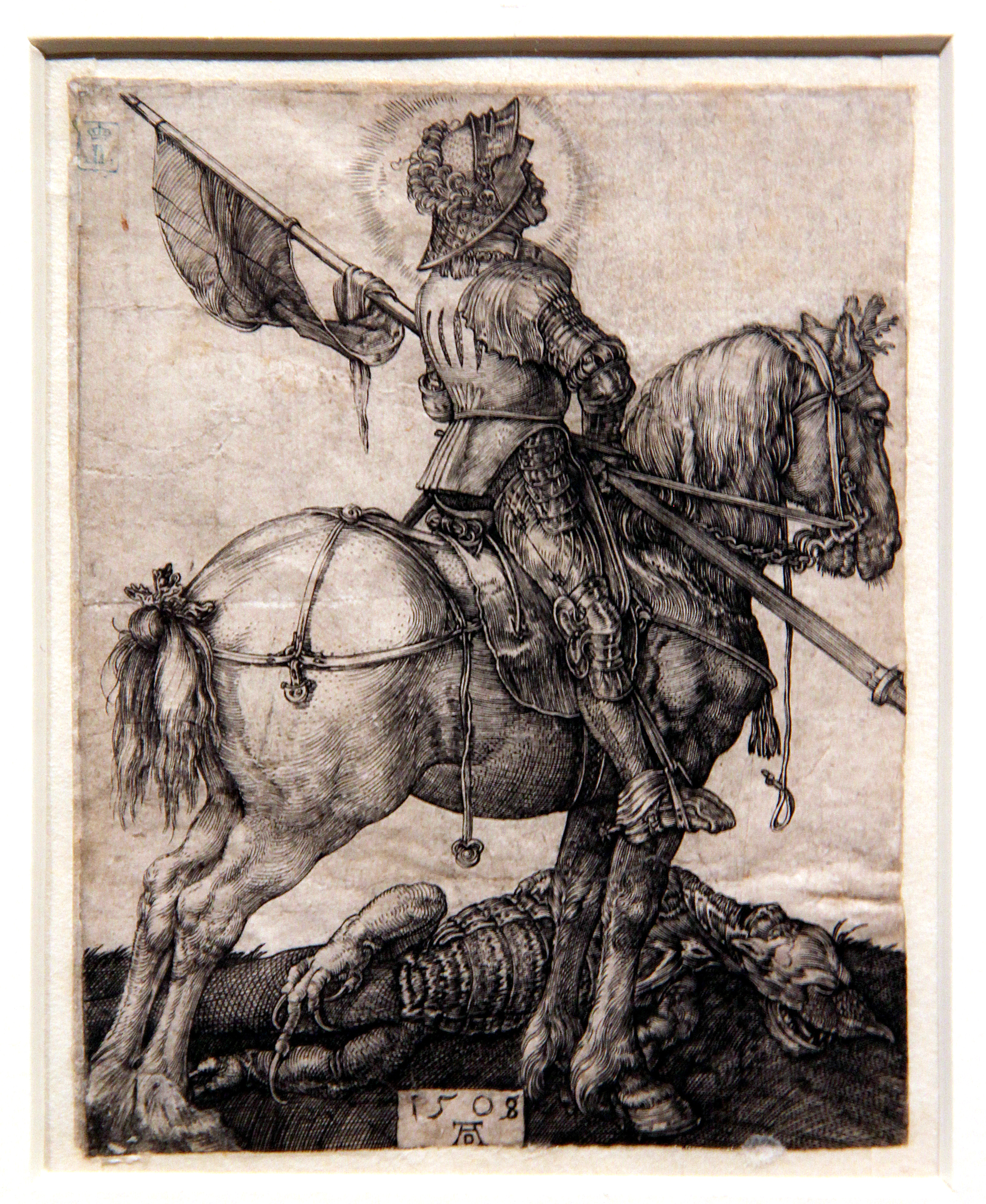
Saint George on horseback by Albrecht Dürer (1508)

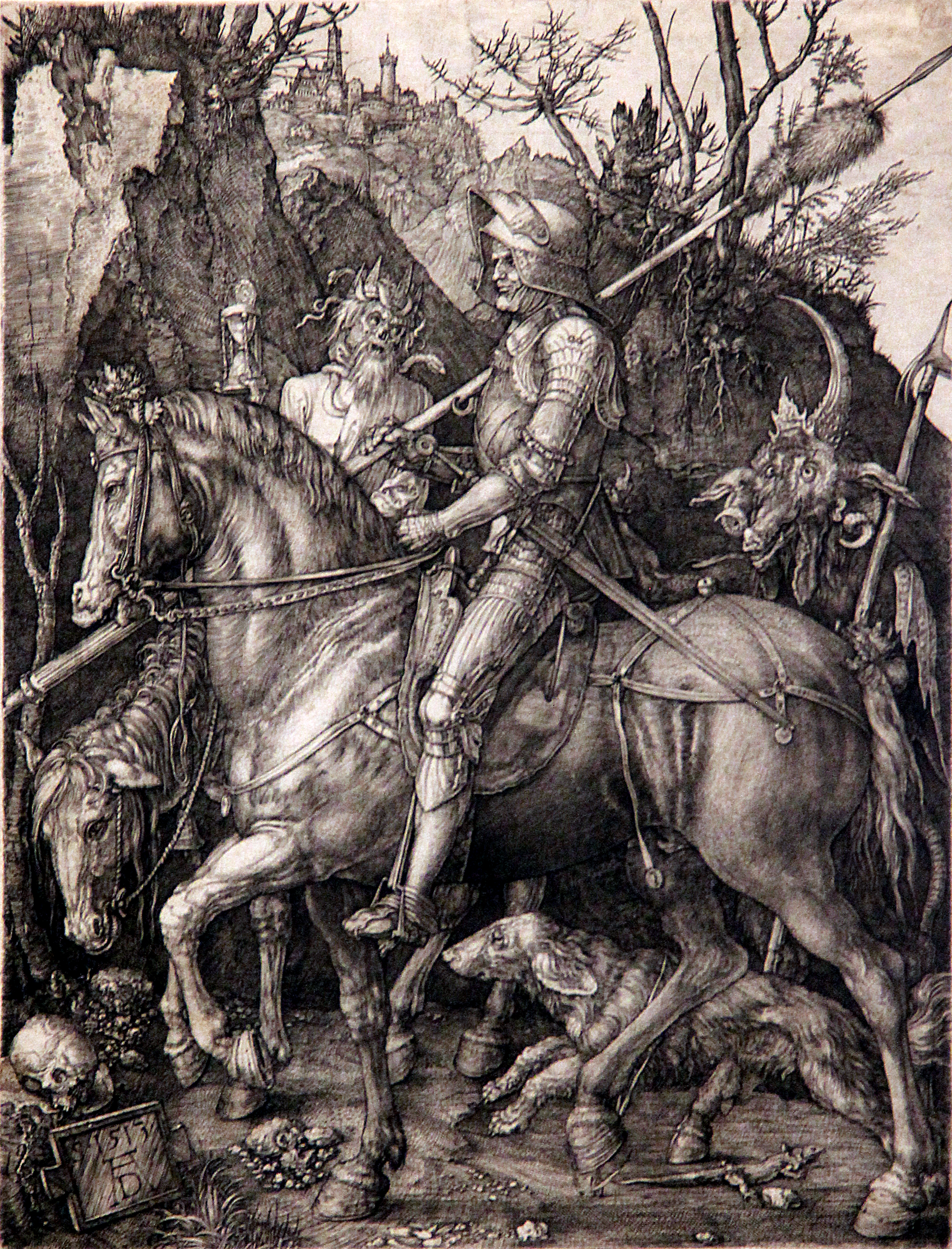
The Horseman, Death and the Devil by Albrecht Dürer (1513)

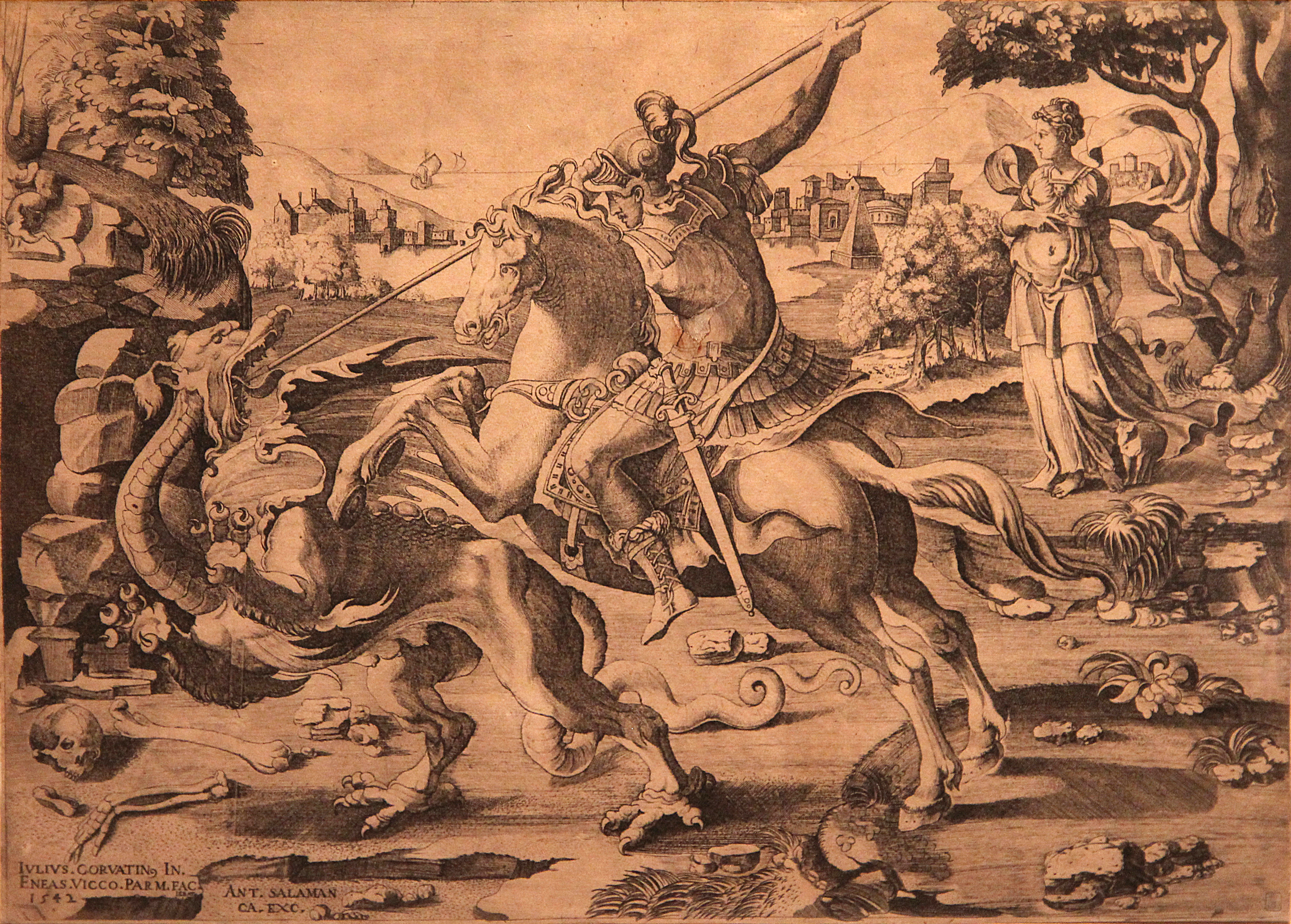
Saint George slaying the dragon by Enea Vico after Giulio Clovio (1522)

== Music Department ==
KBR's Music Department is considered one of Belgium's most important centers for the preservation and study of music-related documents. The Music Department maintains a rich and varied collection composed of hundreds of thousands of manuscript and printed scores, about 100,000 sound recordings, a large collection of correspondence, printed works, concert programmes, posters, photographs and other iconographic documents, not to mention varied objects such as medals, busts, casts, music instruments. The most representative pieces are part of collections of François-Joseph Fétis, Eugène Ysaÿe, Henri Vieuxtemps, Marc Danval, Yves Becko, Denijs Dille, Flor Peeters and Edgar Tinel. Although most music-related documents in the Royal Library are held in the Music Department, certain additional works are held in the Manuscripts & Rare Books and Prints & Drawings Departments of KBR.

The Music Division was founded in 1965, building upon the more than 5,000 printed and manuscript documents that made up the private collection of the important 19th-century musicologist François-Joseph Fétis, acquired by the Royal Library in 1872. This Fétis Collection is an important source for the study of early music, and holds a number of important documents such as the autograph manuscript of Johann Sebastian Bach's BWV 995 – Suite in G minor. Among the oldest pieces of the Fétis Collection are several late 15th century manuscripts by the music theorist Johannes Tinctoris.

The Music Division maintains an active policy of acquisitions through donations and purchase of documents linked with Belgian musical figures such as André-Ernest-Modeste Grétry, Henri Vieuxtemps, César Franck, Eugène Ysaÿe and Guillaume Lekeu, not to mention other European figures such as Albert Roussel, Darius Milhaud, Franz Liszt, Béla Bartók and Edvard Grieg. More recently, the purchase of the Marc Danval and Eric Mathot collections enriched the Music Division's collections with tens of thousands recordings and scores of jazz, salon and other popular music from Belgium and abroad.

Through legal deposit, the Music Division also acquires a considerable number of musicological works and scores printed in Belgium. The Music Division assumes an active role within various international associations, notably the International Association of Music Libraries, Archives and Documentation Centres (IAML), the Répertoire International de Littérature Musicale (RILM) and the Répertoire International des Sources Musicales (RISM).

The non-profit organisation Archives Béla Bartók de Belgique was created in 2002 and has its headquarters in the Music Division.

== KBR Museum ==
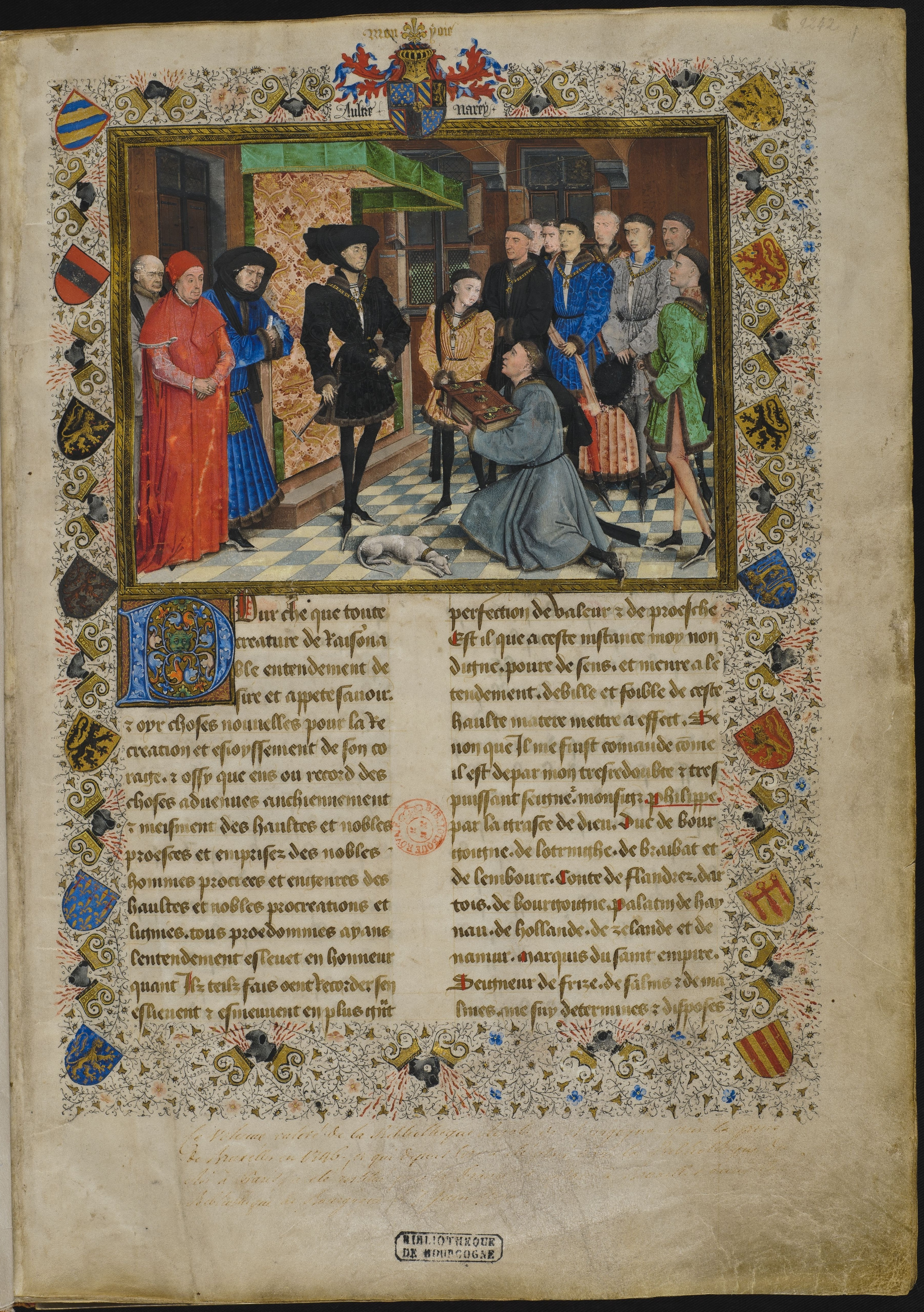
Frontispiece to the Chronicles of Hainaut with miniature by Rogier van der Weyden (c. 1448)

KBR Museum, opened in 2020, is a museum in and around the restored Nassau Chapel of the Royal Library of Belgium.

The display is dedicated to an extensive collection of manuscripts from the Burgundian era (the so-called Bibliothèque des ducs de Bourgogne or Librije van Bourgondië). In addition to the original manuscripts of the Burgundian dukes, paintings, retables, sculptures, weapons and everyday objects from major museums are on display to provide the historical context of the manuscripts. Among the top exhibits are the 15th-century Chronicles of Hainaut, commissioned by Philip the Good with a miniature by Rogier van der Weyden.

== Librarium ==
Librarium is a permanent exhibition dedicated to the history of books. The Librarium consists of 6 halls each shedding a different light on carriers of writing. In the first hall, the book emergence is introduced. The whole room is dedicated to show the relation between word and image. The collection material is changed every three months. Moreover, the exhibition shows furnished rooms of Henry van de Velde, Michel de Ghelderode and Émile Verhaeren.

== Directors ==
- 1837–1850: Frédéric de Reiffenberg
- 1850–1887: Louis-Joseph Alvin
- 1887–1904: Edouard Fétis
- 1904–1909: Henri Hymans
- 1909–1912: Joseph Van den Gheyn, S.J.
- 1912–1914: Dom Ursmer Berlière O.S.B.
- 1919–1929: Louis Paris
- 1929–1943: Victor Tourneur
- 1944–1953: Frédéric Lyna
- 1953–1955: Marcel Hoc
- 1956–1973: Herman Liebaers
- 1973–1990: Martin Wittek
- 1990–1991: Denise De Weerdt
- 1992: Josiane Roelants-Abraham
- 1992–2002: Pierre Cockshaw
- 2002–2005: Raphaël De Smedt
- 2005–2017: Patrick Lefèvre
- 2017–present: Sara Lammens

== Nazi looting ==
In 2020, La Buveuse d'Absinthe by Félicien Rops, which was looted by the Nazis from the Jewish art collector and lawyer Armand Dorville, was found to be in possession of the Royal Library of Belgium.

== See also ==
- List of libraries in Belgium
- Academia Belgica
- Belgian Federal Science Policy Office (BELSPO)
- Brussels Coin Cabinet
- Center for Historical Research and Documentation on War and Contemporary Society
- National and Provincial State Archives
- National Library of the Netherlands
