= Jean Chevrot =

French bishop

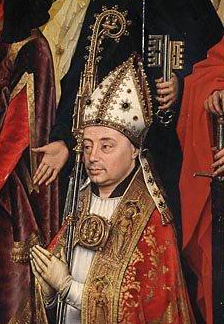
Chevrot in a detail from Lamentation of Christ by Rogier van der Weyden (Mauritshuis).

Jean Chevrot (c. 1395, Poligny, Jura - 23 September 1460, Lille) was a French bishop who served as president of the council of Burgundy for Philip the Good and Isabella of Portugal. He was a multi-talented minister in whom Philip placed much confidence. One of his closest collaborators was chancellor Nicolas Rolin.

== Life ==
=== Career ===
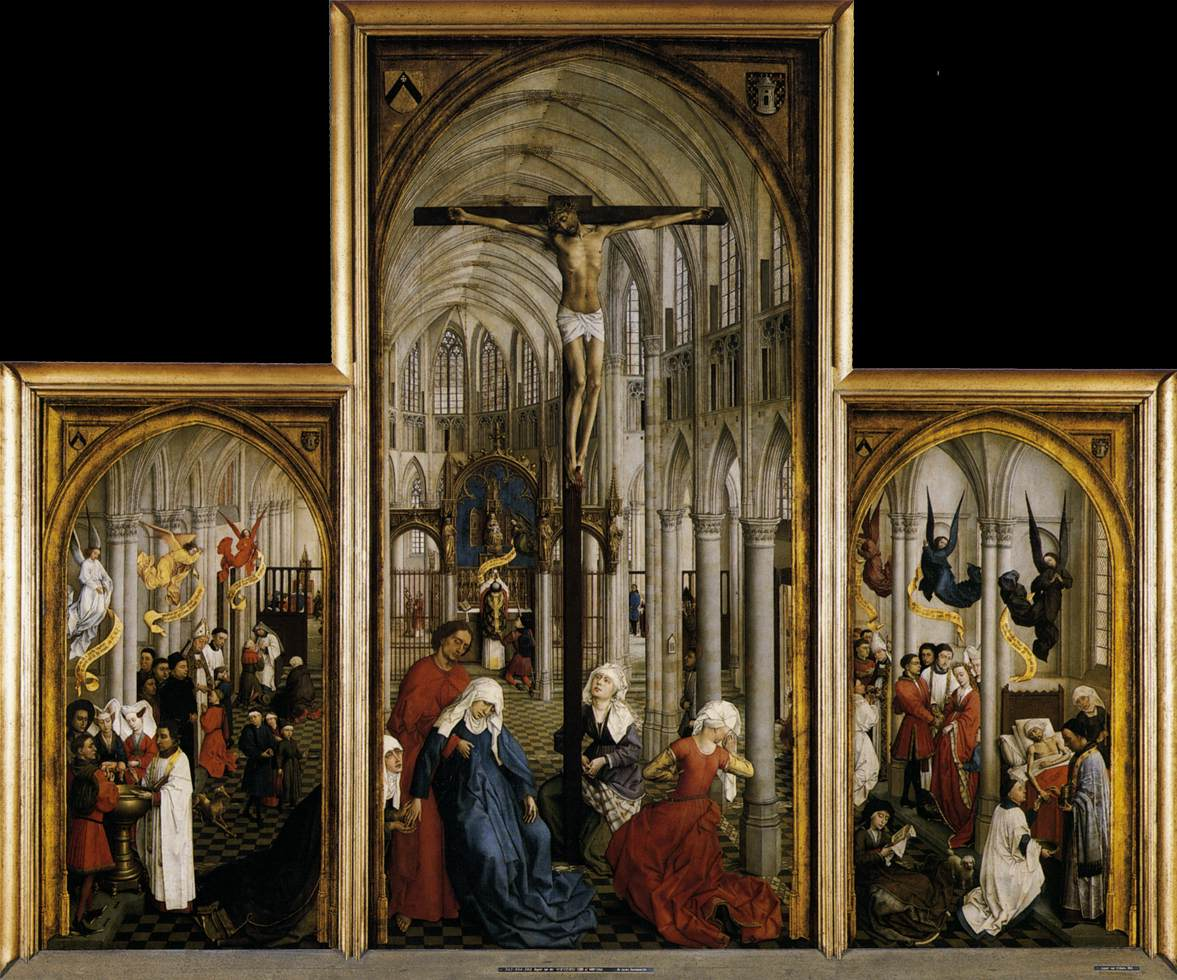
Seven Sacraments Altarpiece by van der Weyden.

He gained his BA at the University of Paris, where he was made rector in 1421. He became a canon of Besançon in 1417, of Saint-Marcel, Paris in 1422, of the collégiale Notre-Dame de Beaune in 1435 and later also of Cambrai and Harelbeke. In 1426 he was also made archdeacon of the Norman Vexin at Rouen, followed by becoming chaplain of the Saint Jean chapel at Salins in 1435.

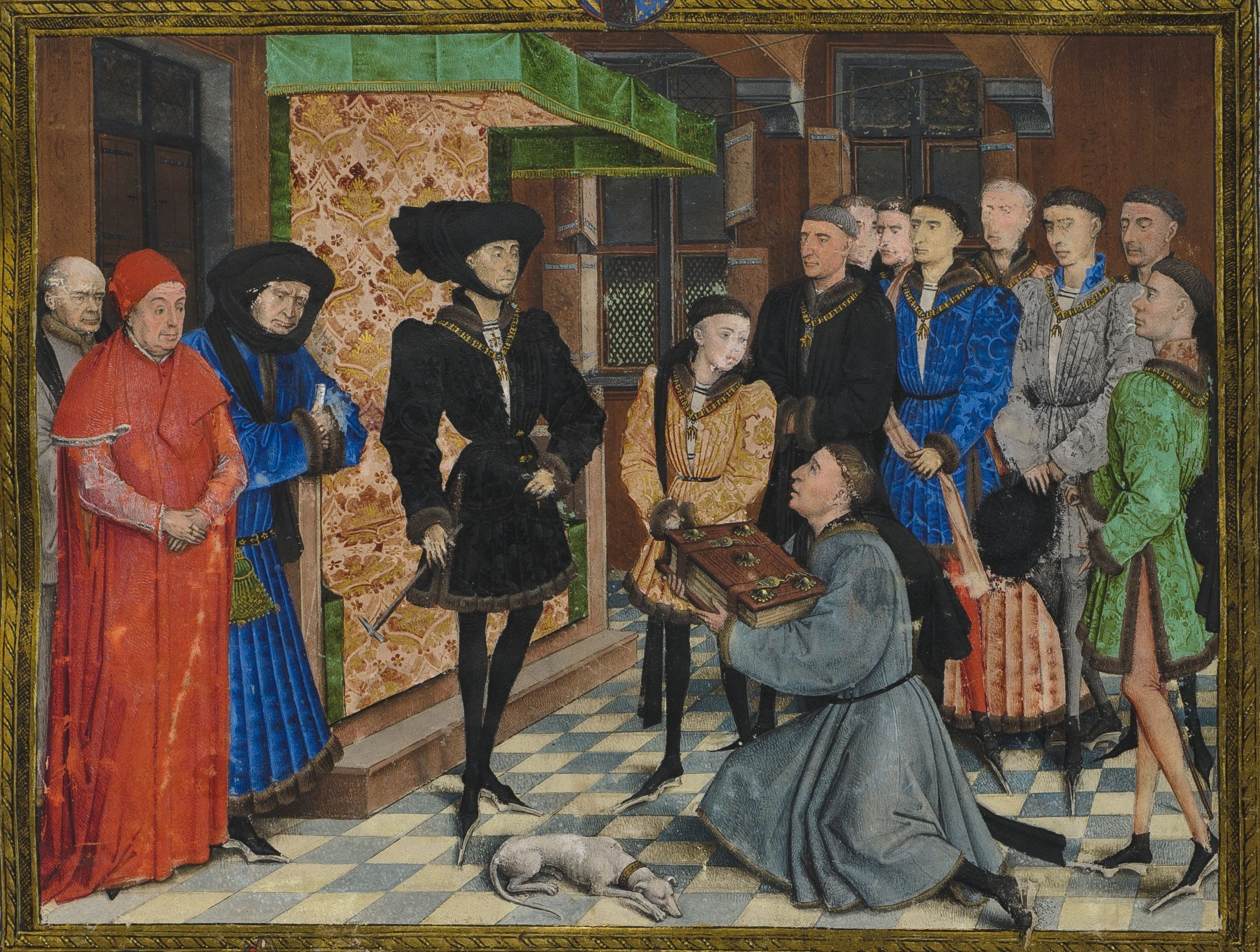
Miniature in the Chronicles of Hainaut by Jean Wauquelin (1446-1448).

He was the nephew of Simon Chevrot, abbot of Goailles, counsellor to the duke and president of the council - Simon took a keen interest in Jean's education and also collaborated with his friend Jean Chousat to get Jean Chevrot onto the duke's counsel. He began his political career in the decade after 1433. He was sent to England in 1433 and 1434 as one of the ambassadors aiming to convince Henry VI of England to conclude a general peace treaty and release Charles I of Orléans. He accompanied Philip the Good to Nevers then to Paris to attend the peace talks which culminated in the Treaty of Arras. After a long and complex struggle with Jean d'Harcourt, Jean Chevrot became bishop of Tournai on 5 November 1436 and was installed in his cathedral on 12 January 1440, accompanied by Isabella and several gentlemen.

=== Later years ===
When Philip edited his will on 8 December 1441 he put Isabella in charge of the duchy and Philip's successor Charles, with Jean Chevrot as her deputy. Between 1444 and 1457 Chevrot began to retire from the Aulic Council, but continued to fulfil his everyday functions as bishop. However, he was now only entrusted with other tasks in exceptional circumstances, giving way to Jean de Thoisy and Guillaume Fillâtre, the duke's favoured councillor. The duke granted him the bishopric of Tournai and Toul thanks to a papal bull received on 1 September 1460. Chevrot commissioned the Seven Sacraments Altarpiece and The Descent from the Cross from Rogier van der Weyden (entre 1452 et 1455) - both works show him - and he also appears on the frontispiece of the Chronicles of Hainaut.

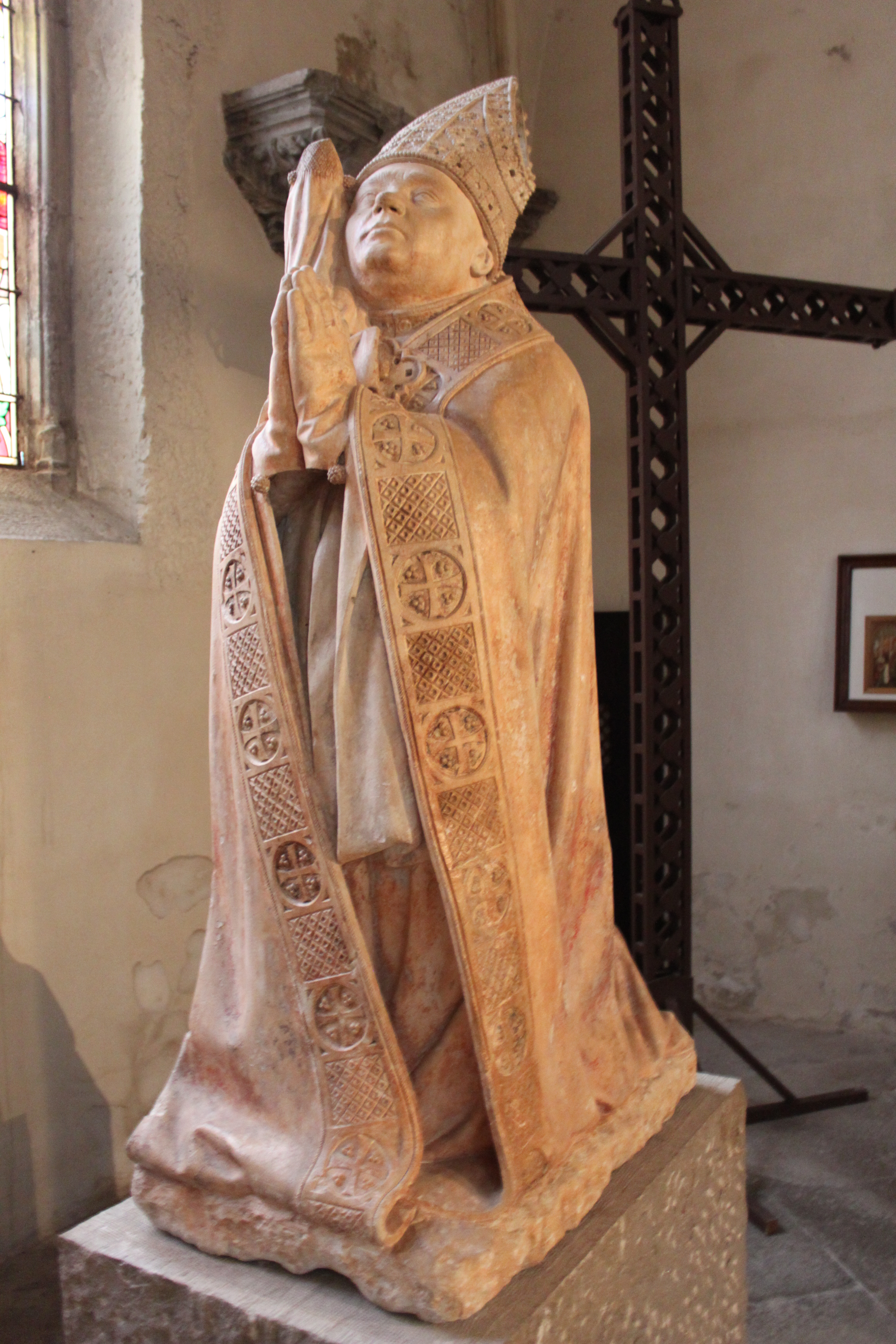
Statue of Jean Chevrot in the Collégiale Saint-Hippolyte de Poligny.

He wrote his last will and testament at Lille on 18 January 1458, leaving a large sum for a chapel of St Anthony that he had founded in the collégiale Saint-Hippolyte at Poligny - it had a rich library, "vestments, relics, joys and altar fixtures". He was bedridden for months before finally dying on 23 September 1460 in his town house in Lille, which was his main residence - he left it to his successor Guillaume Fillastre.

After his funeral he was buried in the choir of Tournai Cathedral beside the tomb of Walter de Marvis near the high altar, under the chest containing relics of Hippolytus of Rome which he had brought there from Poligny. A black marble monument with a copper effigy, his coat of arms and a Latin inscription were all erected by his successor and by the cathedral chapter, though they were destroyed by the Protestants in 1566.

== Bibliography (in French) ==
- Fabienne Joubert (dir.), L'artiste et le clerc. La commande artistique des grands ecclésiastiques à la fin du Moyen Age (xiv -xvi siècles). (Cultures et civilisations medievales, 36). Paris, PUPS, 2006, 415 p., ISBN 2-84050-438-3.
- Monique Sommé, Les délégations de pouvoir à la duchesse de Bourgogne Isabelle de Portugal au milieu du XVe siècle, Actes des congrès de la Société des historiens médiévistes de l'enseignement supérieur public, Année 1992, Volume 23, Numéro 23, p. 285-301
- Henri Tribout de Morembert, Jean Chevrot, évêque de Tournai et de Toul vers 1395-1460, 1965, Éditions Le Lorrain, p. 50
