= José Sevenants =

Belgian composer and pianist (1868–1946)

José Sevenants (Brussels, 25 August 1868 - 10 December 1946) was a Belgian pianist, composer, and teacher.

== Biography ==
José Sevenants was a pupil at the Royal Conservatory of Brussels where he studied piano with Arthur De Greef (receiving a premier prix in 1891), harmony with Joseph Jongen and counterpoint with Hubert-Ferdinand Kufferath. Following his studies, he became a concert pianist and later, an assistant piano instructor at the Royal Conservatory of Brussels in 1924, where he seconded Charles Scharrès until 1933. His better known students included Franz Constant, Marcel Poot, and André Dumortier.

As composer, Sevenants’s works are impressionistic and similar in style to the music of Ravel and Debussy, including titles such as Le Jardin enchanté, Humoresque, and Pan et les Nymphes. Most of his works were published by the Brussels publisher L'Art Belge and its successor, Bosworth.

Sevenants was a piano teacher. He was the author of the pedagogical volume Le Mécanisme pianistique contemporain, also published by L’Art Belge.

José Sevenants was Fernand Sevenants’s father and Marc Danval’s grandfather, both of whom became renowned figures in Belgian musical life.
