= Jacques de Guyse =

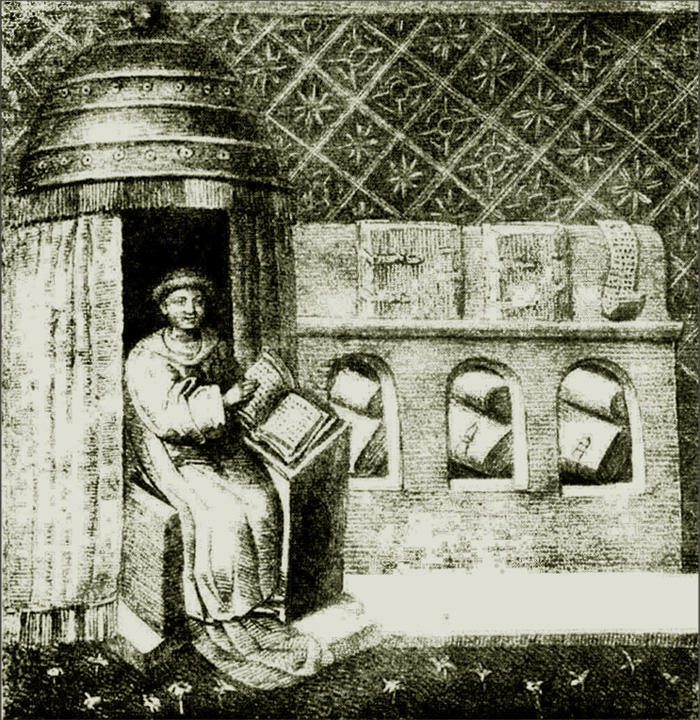
Jacques de Guyse in his scriptorium

Jacques de Guyse (Latin: Iacobus de Guisia; 1334−1399) was a Franciscan historian of the County of Hainaut.

Guyse was born in 1334 in Mons in the County of Hainaut. After studying at the University of Paris, where he obtained a doctorate in theology, he returned to Hainaut, where he died at Valenciennes in 1399.

His main work is the wide-ranging Annales Historiae Illustrium Principum Hannoniae ("Annals of the History of Illustrious Princes of Hainaut") in which he covered the history of Hainaut from its mythological beginnings to the year 1254. He cited the otherwise unknown historians Lucius of Tongres, Hugh of Toul, Nicolas Rucléri and Clairembault. Initially this work did not get much attention, but half a century later it was translated from Latin to French by Jean Wauquelin and richly illuminated.
