= Jean Wauquelin =

Burgundian writer and translator (1401–1452)

Jean Wauquelin

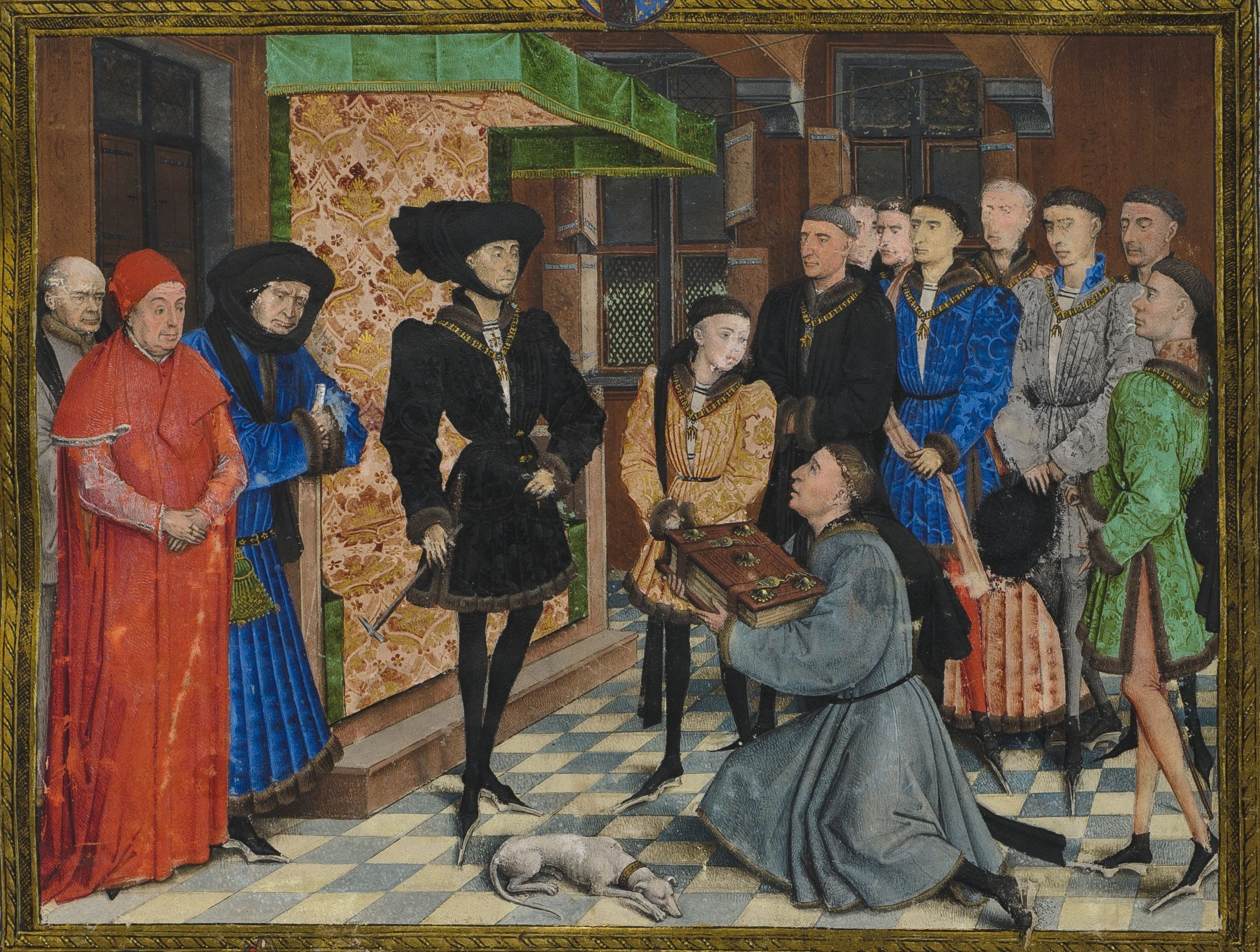
Jean Wauquelin presenting his 'Chroniques de Hainaut' to Philip the Good. Wauquelin appears in the only known miniature by Rogier van der Weyden.

Location of the County of Hainaut and its capital of Mons, now in modern Belgium, where Jean Wauquelin was active.

Jean Wauquelin (fl. 15th century), born in Picardy, was a writer and translator in French, active in the County of Hainaut in the Burgundian Netherlands, a county now located in Belgium near the border with France. Wauquelin died on 7 September 1452 in Mons, Hainaut. His date of birth remains unknown.

He translated into French the Chronica ducum Lotharingiae et Brabantiae of Emond de Dynter, the Historia regum Britanniae of Geoffrey of Monmouth, and the Annales historiae illustrium principum Hannoniae of Jacques de Guyse.

Jean Wauquelin also put into prose the Manekine of Philippe de Beaumanoir, the Belle Hélène de Constantinople, and produced a compilation of French romances of Alexander the Great in his Livre des conquestes et faits d'Alexandre le Grand ("Book of the conquests and deeds of Alexander the Great").

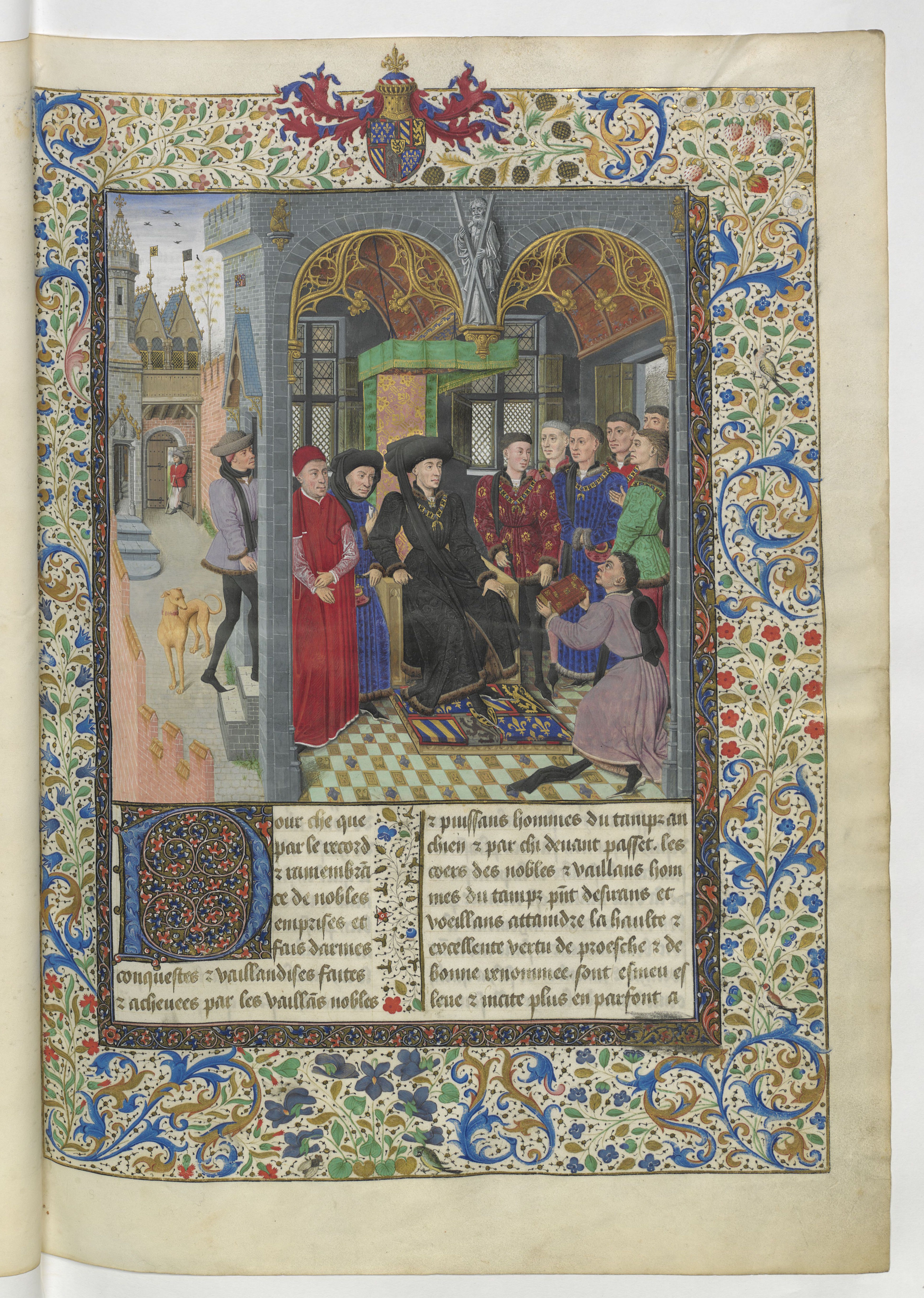
Jean Wauquelin presenting his Livre des conquestes et faits d'Alexandre le Grand to Philip the Good.

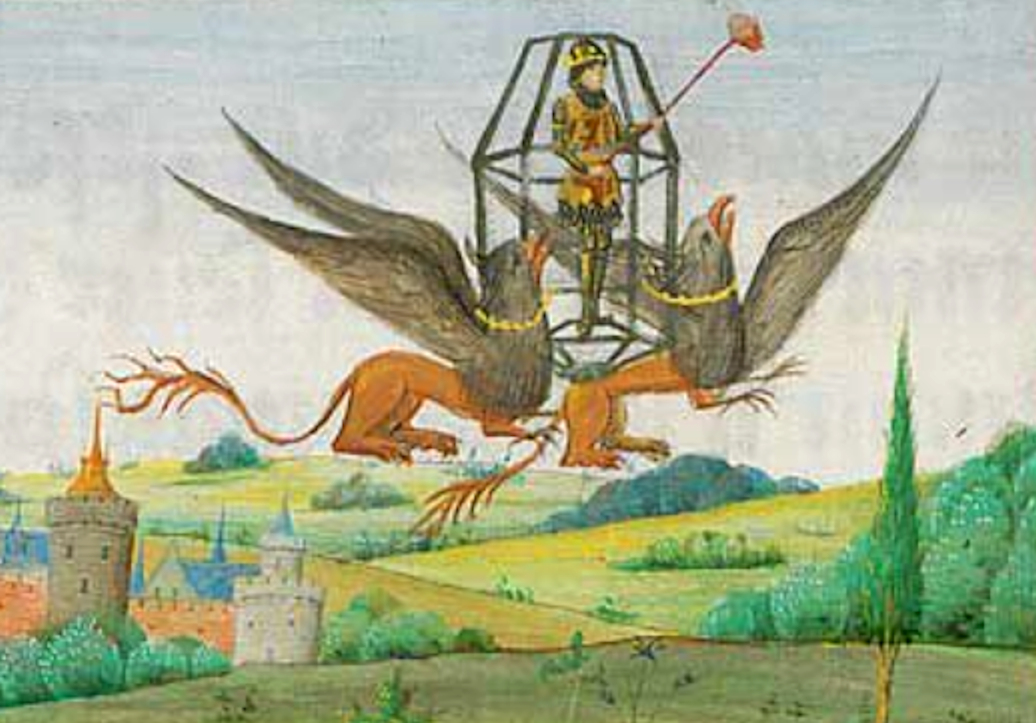
Alexander the Great conquering the air. Jean Wauquelin, Les faits et conquêtes d'Alexandre le Grand, Flanders, 1448–1449.

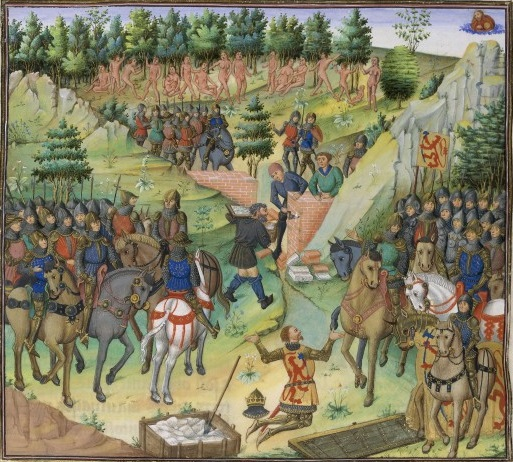
Alexander building a wall to enclose the people of "Gog and Magog", from Wauquelin's story of Alexander.

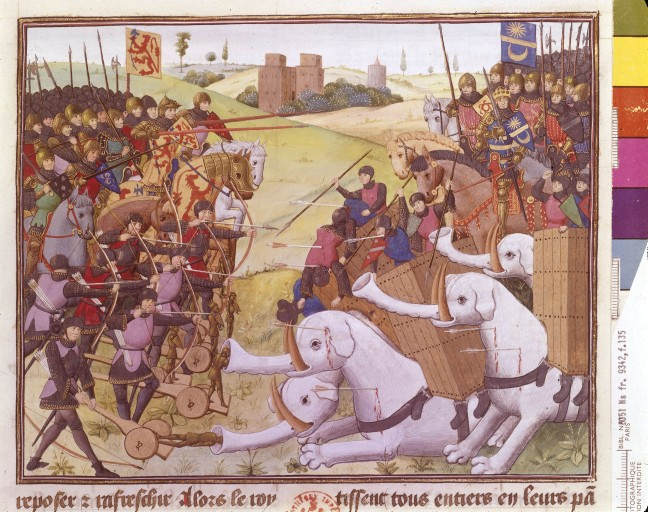
Battle between Alexander and Porus.

== Works ==
- La geste ou histore du noble roy Alixandre, roy de Macedonne
