= Jan Moedwil =

Radio België presenter

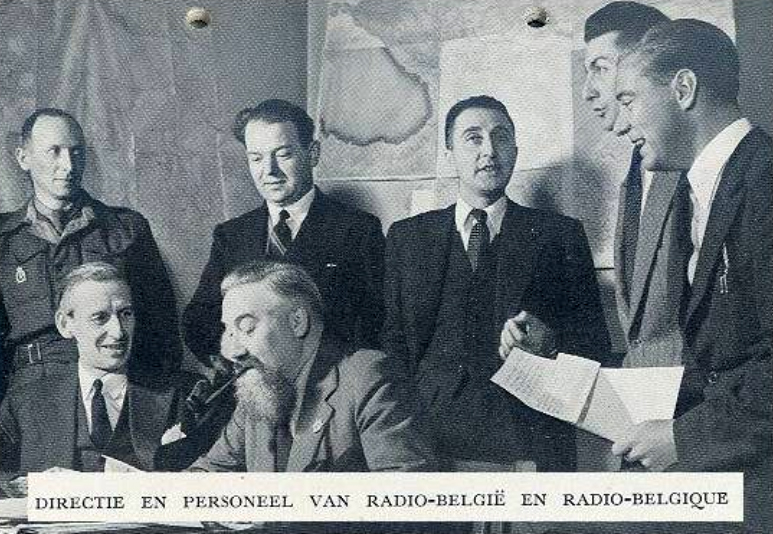
Staff of Radio Belgique in September 1944. Geersens is at the microphone, with Victor de Laveleye seated to the left

Fernand (Nand) Geersens (Borgerhout, 21 October 1895 – Ixelles, 9 February 1959) was the Dutch-language voice of Radio België, the channel of the Belgian National Radio Broadcaster (BNRO) during World War II which broadcast from London. He was known by the nom de guerre Jan Moedwil.

== Career ==
Prior to his radio career, Geersens was editor-in-chief of the bibliophile review Boek en Kunst and had since the 1920s been affiliated with the Institut supérieur des arts décoratifs (French for 'Higher Institute of Decorative Arts'). He was also active in Liberal organizations and was chairman of the Liberale Vlaamschen Bond. As of 1936, Geersens worked for Nationaal Instituut voor de Radio-omroep in the expenditure department and was therefore not directly involved in reporting.

At Radio Belgique Victor de Laveleye was his counterpart and provided news bulletins for the French-speaking part of the country. Laveleye and Geersens collaborated on the first Radio Belgique broadcast on 28 September 1940. Geersen's catchphrase was a rhyming couplet with which he ended his broadcasts: "We do our best, without being lucky, will still get them, the traitors!" (Wij doen ons best, zonder er op te boffen, toch krijgen we ze wel, de moffen!). The Dutch broadcaster Loe de Jong described Geersens's editorial style as "like a church organ playing with all the stops pulled out". When the "V for Victory" campaign was launched by the Belgian section at the BBC on 14 January 1941, it was first presented to Dutch-speaking listeners in a Jan Moedwil broadcast.

In late 1944, during the Liberation of Belgium, Geersens expressed concern about how Belgium might recover from its occupation, noting that "[o]ur people, to a certain extent, are sick". After the liberation, an album of photographs and sketches was published in Brussels to celebrate his work for the BBC during the German occupation.

== Honours and awards ==
After the war, Geersens was appointed Officer of the Order of Leopold in Belgium, Commander of the Order of Orange-Nassau in the Netherlands and Honorary Officer of the Civil Division of the Most Excellent Order of the British Empire, which he received in recognition of his contribution during the occupation. His papers are held by the Liberal Archive in Ghent, Belgium.
