= Jamshedji =

Jamshedji is both a given name and a surname. Notable people with the name include:

- Jamshedji Duggan (1884–1957), Indian surgeon
- Jamshedji Sorab Kukadaru (1831–1900), Indian priest
- Jamshedji Framji Madan (1857–1923), Indian theatre and film magnate
- Rustomji Jamshedji (1892–1976), Indian cricketer
- Phiroze Jamshedji Jeejeebhoy, Indian businessman
- Jivanji Jamshedji Modi (1854–1933), Indian priest
- Kavasji Jamshedji Petigara (1877–1941), Indian police officer
