= Flag of Syracuse =

Flag for city in New York, U.S.

City of Syracuse, New York
- Current flag of Syracuse, New York
- "First Light"
- Use: Civil flag
- Adopted: June 20, 2023
- Design: An orange six-pointed star on a white triangle. The white triangle lays between two mirrored right triangles of different shades of blue.
- Designed by: Eric Hart

The flag of Syracuse, New York was designed by Eric Hart on June 14, 2023 and officially adopted in June 20, 2023. It is for the city of Syracuse in the state of New York. The flag consists of two right triangles of different shades of blue, a white isosceles triangle, and an orange six-pointed star.

== Symbolism ==
The star represents the sun, and the six points of the star each represent both the six nations of the Haudenosaunee and the six historical names of Syracuse. The star on the white is reminiscent of sunrise, the future, and also using sunshine to extract salt from salt springs.

The mirrored triangles both represent the hills of Onondaga County. The light blue triangle represents the westward hill, and the dark blue triangle represents the eastward hill. The white triangle in the middle represents the Onondaga Valley. The angled borders between the triangles symbolizes the V sign, a symbol of peace. Together, the three triangles also represent the past (light blue triangle), present (white triangle), and future (dark blue triangle).

== Previous flag ==
City of Syracuse, New York
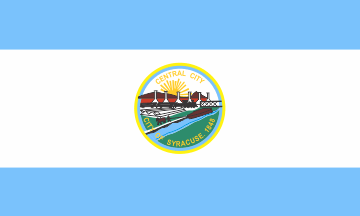
- Historic flag of Syracuse, New York
- Adopted: 1915 / 1974 / 1986
- Relinquished: 2023
- Design: A horizontal triband of blue and white, with the city seal in the middle

The previous flag of Syracuse was first adopted in 1915 and had minor revisions in 1974 and 1986. In 2023, Adapt CNY held a contest to replace the old city flag with a newer one. Over three hundred flags were submitted, which was narrowed down to four flags.
