= Joint War Organisation =

The Joint War Organisation (JWO) was a combined operation of the British Red Cross Society and the Order of St John of Jerusalem during the World Wars. It was first created in 1914 and ceased operations when World War I ended in 1919; the organisation was re-formed upon the British entry into World War II in 1939 and was active until its permanent disbanding in 1947. The Joint War Committee (JWC), a non-government administrative body, controlled the JWO and the Joint War Finance Committee managed its finances and concentrated on raising donations and funding.

== World War I ==
In August 1914, just after the outbreak of war in Europe, the British Red Cross and the Order of St John proposed to form the Joint War Committee with the intention of working with joint aims, reducing duplication of effort and providing St John personnel with the protection of the Red Cross. An agreement to the merger was concluded on 24 October 1914. The St Andrew's Ambulance Association in Scotland also joined the organisation.

Fundraising activities and resources were pooled and everyone worked together under the protective emblem of the Red Cross. The JWO became the main contact with the Royal Army Medical Corps (RAMC) as regards patient services when casualties swamped the Army medical capability.

The JWO organised volunteers alongside technical and professional staff. It also supplied the machinery and mechanisms to provide services in Britain and in the conflict areas of Europe, the Middle East, Russia, and East Africa. In the UK, each region created their local JWO with a chairman and committee.

=== Voluntary Aid Detachments ===
Five years earlier in 1909, a scheme had been devised to organise volunteers into Voluntary Aid Detachments (VAD). The idea was to provide supplementary aid for the Territorial Medical Services.

Members of the British Red Cross and the Order of St John were organised into VAD's. Each VAD had either male or female VAD's.

By 1914 there were 2,000 VAD's with 70,000 volunteers, and within four years the number had grown to 4,000 VAD's and 125,000 volunteers.

Volunteers were trained in a number of skills, with classes and examinations arranged by a local VAD.

VAD nurses were introduced into RAMC hospitals in England and France. VAD's also replaced males in hospitals so they could be sent to the field. VAD's worked overseas in transport and hospitals.

Auxiliary hospitals were established in suitable buildings where VAD's and part-time VAD's could look after recuperating patients. By the end of the war there were 1,786 such hospitals. Many were called V.A.D. Hospitals.

Katharine Furse was head of the VAD from 1915 to 1917, and was appointed Dame Grand Cross of the Most Excellent Order of the British Empire in 1917 for her services.

The Red Cross war medal was awarded to members of the Red Cross or its VAD volunteers who served in the UK between 4 August 1914 and 31 December 1919 and had served over 1,000 hours. 41,000 members received the medal.

Over 1,400 received military commendations or awards for bravery and over 250 died during the war such as Edith Munro a nurse who died in East London in 1916.

==== Clothing and provisions and their distribution ====
"Working parties" operated in most towns to collect clothing, make bandages, splints etc. A series of "'Central Work Rooms"' were created in 1915 to organise these working parties and standardise the items being created which were gathered at "Work Depots".

==== Other activities ====
Other activities of VAD's included:

- Rest stations at railway stations
- Fundraising – over £21 million was raised
- Missing and wounded service
- Air raid duty
- Libraries
- Transport of patients
- Providing grants such as to Hammersmith hospital to help rehabilitation

Red Cross collecting boxes moved from National to Regional VAD control, with local VAD's keeping 20% of the funds collected, 80% going for National use.

=== Other activities ===
To promote flag day events, the Red Cross had Canadian women living in London sell tinted maple leaves, Australian sellers sold special Australian flags and leather kangaroos, and women from New Zealand sold kiwi badges.

Originally PoW's would receive food packages from governments, however this was soon blocked and with other charitable organisations, the JWO under the banner of the International Red Cross stepped in to send a parcel every two weeks to each prisoner. The total cost of parcels in World War 1 was £5,145,458-16s–9d.

During the First World War relief services for affected soldiers in India were provided by a branch of the JWC. On 3 March 1920 a bill was introduced to the Indian Legislative Council by Sir Claude Hill (a member of the Viceroy's Executive Council who was also Chairman of the Joint War Committee in India) to constitute the Indian Red Cross Society, independent of the British Red Cross.

=== The British Prisoner of War ===
The Central Prisoner of War Committee of the Red Cross and Order of St John published a monthly journal, The British Prisoner of War beginning in January 1918, for the benefit of the families and friends of British and Commonwealth prisoners of war.

The JWO was disbanded after World War I in 1919.

=== Honoured personnel ===
The names and titles of recipients are given as at the time of their appointment or promotion.

- Arthur Stanley, Chairman of the Joint War Committee, appointed Companion of the Order of the Bath (CB) in 1916, appointed Knight Grand Cross of The Most Excellent Order of the British Empire (GBE) in 1917
- Mary Harmsworth, Viscountess Northcliffe, member of the Joint War Committee, appointed Dame Grand Cross of The Most Excellent Order of the British Empire (GBE) in the 1918 New Year Honours
- Robert Arundell Hudson, Treasurer and Financial Director of the Joint War Committee, appointed GBE in the 1918 New Years Honours
- Princess Helena of the United Kingdom, member of the Council of the British Red Cross Society and of the Joint War Committee, appointed GBE in the 1918 Birthday Honours
- Robert Windsor-Clive, 1st Earl of Plymouth, Sub-Prior of the Order of St John of Jerusalem in England and member of the Joint War Committee, appointed GBE in the 1918 Birthday Honours
- William Edmund Garstin, member of the Council of the British Red Cross Society and Joint War Committee, member of the Voluntary Aid Detachment Advisory Committee and of the Voluntary Aid Detachment Selection Board, appointed GBE in the 1918 Birthday Honours
- Adeline Marie, Duchess of Bedford, member of the Joint War Committee, appointed GBE in the 1919 New Year Honours
- Right Honourable Evelyn Cecil, MP, Secretary-General of the Order of St John of Jerusalem in England (1915–1921), Vice-chairman Joint War Committee, appointed GBE in the 1922 New Year Honours

== World War II ==
Reactivated after the declaration of war in 1939, the British Red Cross and St John reformed the Joint War Organisation, which again afforded the St John volunteers protection under the Red Cross emblem.

The system developed in World War I was adopted again with the organisation working in hospitals, care homes, nurseries, ambulance units, rest stations and elsewhere with much of the funding coming from the Duke of Gloucester's Red Cross and St John appeal, which raised over £54 million by 1946.

Communications between the British government War Office and the ICRC did not always go through the JWC, causing possible risks to the ICRC as an independent party.

=== Parcels ===
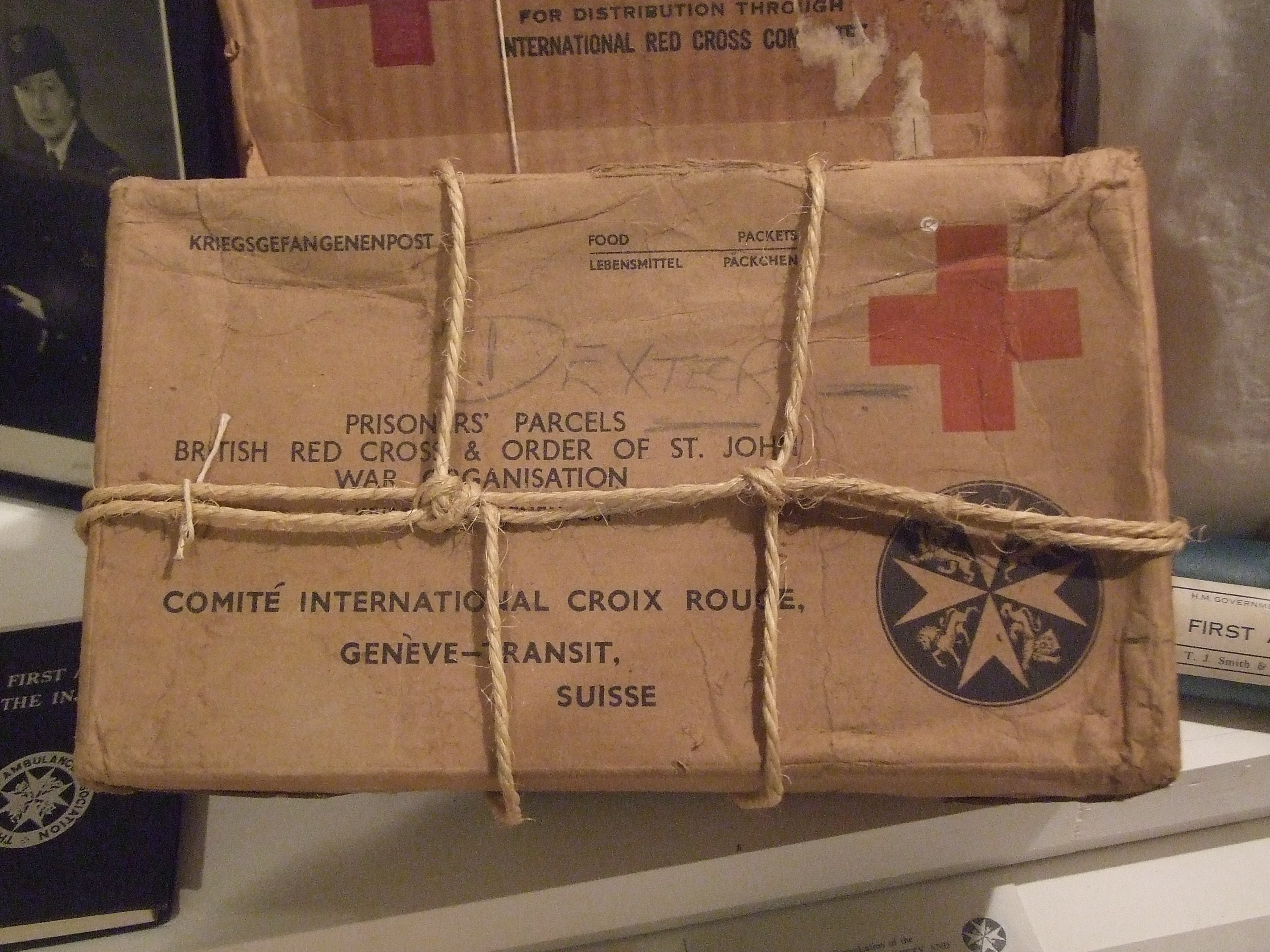
British Red Cross & Order of St John War Organisation food parcel

The JWO was made the lead organization for POW parcels, issued as a British Red Cross & Order of St John War Organisation parcels but colloquially known as Red Cross parcels which were organized for prisoners of war, now operating under the provisions of the third Geneva convention of 1929, which laid out strict rules for the treatment of PoWs. The JWO sent standard food parcels, invalid food parcels, medical supplies, educational books and recreational materials worldwide. During this conflict, over 20 million standard food parcels were sent out using the International Red Cross distribution system.

With the bulk of Europe occupied by Axis forces early in the war, finding a route to deliver parcels was a problem, for which the JWO and the War Office received criticism until it was solved in spring 1941 when International Committee of the Red Cross (ICRC) ships received permission to transport parcels from Lisbon to the South of France, for onward transport to Geneva and subsequent distribution to POW's.

The only part of the British Isles occupied by Germany, the Channel Islands, were helped in the winter of 1944–45 and avoided starvation with food parcels, flour, grain and coal brought by the ICRC ship SS Vega to the local JWO's who had operated throughout the war in occupied Guernsey and Jersey.

=== Personnel ===
Sir Arthur Stanley was elected to resume his role as Chairman of the Joint War Organization in 1939 and served in role until declining health prompted him to resign in September 1946.

Amongst personnel acknowledged for their work during World War II were: (Note: The names and titles of recipients are given as at the time of their appointment or promotion.)

- Field Marshall Sir Philip Chetwode OM GCB GCSI KCMG, Chairman of the executive committee.
- Angela Pery, Countess Limerick, Deputy Chairman of the JWC, appointed Commander of the Most Excellent Order of the British Empire (CBE) in 1942, appointed DBE in 1946
- John Montague Eddy, Esq., Deputy Chairman of the Prisoners of War Department of the JWO, appointed CBE in the 1944 New Year Honours
- Dame Doris Beale DBE RRC*, Matron-in-Chief of Queen Alexandra's Royal Naval Nursing Service (1941–1944), Deputy Matron-in-Chief of the Joint War Organisation (from June 1944)
- Colonel Sir Jamshedji Nasarvanji Duggan CIE OBE JP, Chairman of the Bombay Provincial Joint War Committee of the Indian Red Cross Society and St John Ambulance Association–Bombay, appointed Knight Commander of the Most Excellent Order of the British Empire (KBE) in the 1945 Birthday Honours
- Anne Margaret Bryans, Commissioner of the Joint War Organisation, appointed CBE in the 1945 Birthday Honours

=== Post War ===
The work of the JWO continued after 1945 with work concentrated on helping the wounded, returning soldiers and displaced persons.

Following the liberation of Europe in 1945, Doris Zinkeisen was commissioned by the War Artists' Advisory Committee as a war artist for the North West Europe Commission of the JWO.

The JWO and JWC were disbanded in 1947. The JWC records for 1939–47 have been preserved.
