= Anne Bryans =

British humanitarian and hospital governor (1909–2004)

Dame Anne Bryans DBE DStJ FRSM
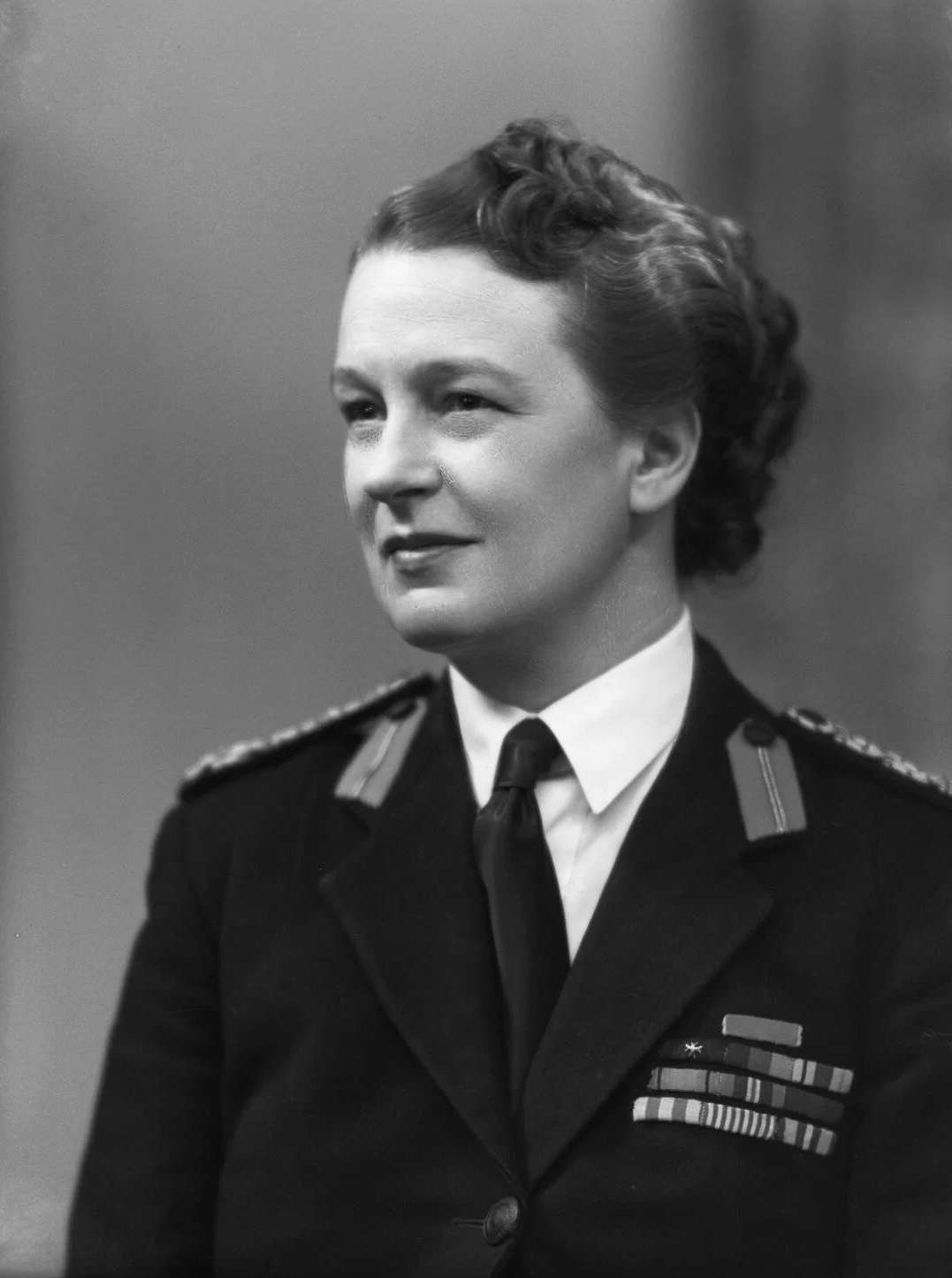
- Bryans in 1953
- Born: Anne Margaret Gilmour; 29 October 1909; Edinburgh, Scotland, UK
- Died: 21 April 2004 (aged 94); Lundin Links, Scotland, UK
- Employers: British Red Cross Society; Order of St John; Joint War Organisation
- Title: Dame Commander of the Order of the British Empire (1957; CBE 1945); Dame of Grace of the Order of St John (1976); Fellow of the Royal Society of Medicine (1976)
- Spouse: John Reginald Bryans (married 1932)
- Children: John Patrick Gilmour Bryans
- Parents: Sir John Gilmour, 2nd Baronet (father); Mary Louise Lambert (mother)
- Relatives: Sir John Gilmour, 3rd Baronet (brother)

Dame Anne Margaret Bryans DBE DStJ FRSM (née Gilmour; 29 October 1909 – 21 April 2004) was a British humanitarian and healthcare administrator, remembered as an "indomitable doyenne of the caring profession." She spent much of her life in the service of the British Red Cross Society and the Order of St John of Jerusalem in England, serving with distinction with the Voluntary Aid Detachment (VAD) and Joint War Organisation during World War II. She was Chairman of the Joint Service Hospitals Welfare and VAD Committee from 1960 to 1989.

== Early years ==
Anne Margaret Gilmour was born at 9 Atholl Crescent in Edinburgh, Scotland on 29 October 1909, the eldest child of the Rt Hon. Sir John Gilmour of Lundin and Montrave, 2nd Baronet, and Mary Louise (née Lambert). She was privately educated at Montrave, the Gilmour family estate near Leven, Fife, by a Belgian governess and later studied at the Sorbonne.

== Career ==
She joined the British Red Cross Society in the late 1920 and became a member of staff in 1938. She became the Deputy Commissioner of the British Red Cross and St John War Organisation, Middle East Commission, in 1943 and was Commissioner from January 1945 to June 1945. She was the only woman to be appointed a Commissioner during the Second World War. She was Deputy Chairman of the BRCS Executive Committee from 1953 to 1964, and Vice-Chairman from 1964 to 1976.

Dame Anne Bryans died at Lundin Links in Fife, Scotland, on 21 April 2004, aged 94.

== Personal life ==
In 1932, she married Lieutenant Commander John Reginald "Jack" Bryans RN FRGS, son of clergyman Reginald du Faure Bryans. The couple had one child, Lieutenant Commander John Patrick Gilmour Bryans RN FRGS, born in 1933.

== Other appointments ==
- Lay Member of the Council for Professions Supplementary to Medicine (a predecessor of the Health and Care Professions Council), 1973–79
- Member of the Board of Governors, the Eastman Dental Hospital, 1973–79
- Member, Camden and Islington Area Health Authority, 1974–79
- Vice-President, Open Section, Royal Society of Medicine, 1975, President 1980–82;
- Member of the Independent Television Authority, later Independent Broadcasting Authority
- Member of the Government Anglo-Egyptian Resettlement Board; Member of the BBC/ITA Appeals Committee
- Special Trustee and Chairman of the Royal Free Hospital and the Friends of the Royal Free Hospital
- Vice-President of the Royal College of Nursing
- Governor of Westminster Hospital
