= Red Cross parcel =

Packages sent to World War prisoners of war

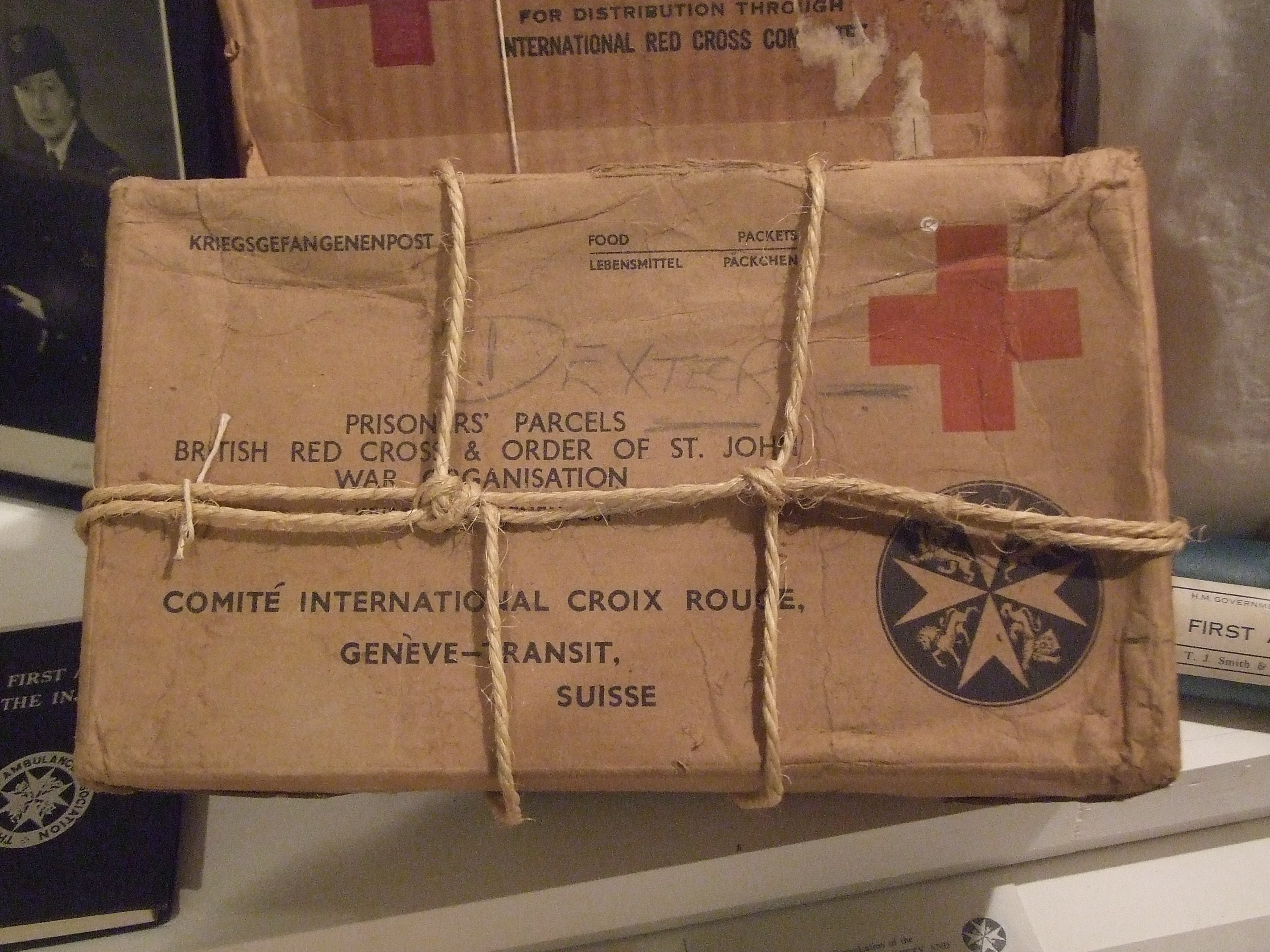
British Red Cross parcel from the First World War

Red Cross parcel refers to packages containing mostly food, tobacco and personal hygiene items sent by the International Association of the Red Cross to prisoners of war (POWs) during the First and Second World Wars, as well as at other times. It can also refer to medical parcels and so-called "release parcels" provided during the Second World War.

The Red Cross arranged them in accordance with the provisions of the Geneva Convention on Prisoners of War (1929). During the Second World War these packages augmented the often-meagre and deficient diets in the prisoner-of-war camps, contributing greatly to prisoner survival and an increase in morale. Modern Red Cross food parcels provide basic food and sanitary needs for persons affected by natural disasters, wars, political upheavals or similar events.

More recent catastrophes involving delivery of Red Cross parcels include events in Georgia, Thailand and Great Britain.

== First World War ==
The Australian Red Cross reported dispatching a total of 395,695 food parcels and 36,339 clothing parcels to Allied POWs in Germany and Turkey during the course of the First World War. Food parcels were also sent to needy civilians in Belgium and France.

British POWs during the First World War were supplied with food parcels by the British Central Prisoners of War Committee of the Joint War Organisation, the combined Red Cross and Order of St John. When the Central Powers refused to allow food to be sent to prisoners of war by the British government, the British Red Cross had stepped forward. Packages containing food and conveniences were sent fortnightly to POWs. Donations collected from the public for these parcels reached £674,908 19s 1d. A total of £5,145,458 16s 9d was spent. By the end of the war, some 9,000,000 food parcels and 800,000 clothing parcels had been despatched by various organisations to British prisoners abroad.

French POWs were required to pay for parcels sent to them through a French commission; these packages included potted chicken, various pâtés, and even bottled wine. Indigent French POWs could receive parcels with lower-quality food for free, from the "Vetement du Prisonnier" which liaised actively with the Croix-Rouge française.

=== New Zealand ===
New Zealand relatives had to buy parcels and were given a choice:

A - 4 shillings

- 1 Alp milk chocolate
- 1 condensed milk
- 1 cheese
- 1 block chocolate
- 2 packets tobacco
- 2 packets citrol
- 1 tin Liebig
- Handkerchiefs or towel or sewing kit

B - 4 shillings

- 1/4 pound (110 g) tea
- 1 condensed milk
- 1/4 pound (110 g) sugar
- 1 jam
- 1 pound (450 g) biscuits
- 1 block chocolate
- 6 Maggi soups
- 1 packet tobacco
- 1 pack cigarettes

C - 6 shillings

- 1 day shirt
- 1 vest
- 1 under drawers
- 1 pair socks
- 1 towel
- 2 handkerchiefs
- 1 toothbrush
- 1 toothpowder
- 1 washrag
- 1 soap

D - For invalids - 6 shillings

- 1 pound (450 g) condensed milk
- 1 pound (450 g) cocoa
- 1/2 pound (225 g) sugar
- 1 pound (450 g) Quaker Oats
- 1 pound (450 g) cod liver capsules
- 1 box extract of malt, Ovomaltine or "Mellins Food"

Relatives could send a specific parcel or a package made up of A & C or B & C It is also noted that each POW was supplied with 400 cigarettes per month, provided by the Joint Council of the Order of St John and the New Zealand Red Cross Society. It was not permitted for private persons to send cigarettes or tobacco to POWs.

=== American ===
The American Red Cross commenced delivery of food parcels to American POWs in German camps in November 1917. The first parcel received by a POW included the following items:

- One pound (450 g) tin of corned beef
- One pound (450 g) tin of roast beef
- One pound (450 g) tin of salmon
- Two pounds (900 g) of hash
- One pound (450 g) of jam
- One bar of soap
- Four packages of tobacco
- One overshirt
- One undershirt
- Two cans of pork and beans
- One can each of tomatoes, corn and peas
- One pair of drawers
- Two pairs of socks
- Three handkerchiefs
- Two towels
- One tube of toothpaste
- Two pounds (900 g) of hard bread
- 1 US pint (0.47 L; 0.83 imp pt) of evaporated milk
- One pound (450 g) of sugar
- One-half (225 g) pound of coffee
- One toothbrush, comb, shaving brush and "housewife" kit (sewing kit), plus shaving soap.

Thereafter, further parcels were sent once per week. These were rotated on a four-week schedule between packages labeled "A", "B", "C" and "D". Each parcel contained meat, fish, vegetable, bread and fruit items, together with eighty cigarettes or other tobacco products. Items of clothing were also provided for American POWs through the American Red Cross. Toward the end of the war, German camp guards and other personnel would sometimes steal the contents of these packages, often leaving only bread for the helpless prisoner. In such events, American camp representatives attempted to make up the loss through stores kept for this purpose in the POW camps.

A special agreement between the YMCA and the American Red Cross resulted in the YMCA providing athletic equipment, books and games for American prisoners in German POW camps.

== Second World War ==
Red Cross food parcels during the Second World War were mostly provided from the United Kingdom, Canada and America (after 1941). An Allied POW might receive any of these packages at any one given time, regardless of his or her own nationality. This was because all such packages were sent from their country of origin to central collection points, where they were subsequently distributed to Axis POW camps by the International Committee of the Red Cross.

For POWs held by Axis forces in Europe the parcel route through Lisbon required escorted ships to bring the crates of parcels, or for British, mail bags full of parcels, to Lisbon, there being no safe conduct agreement. In Portugal, parcels would be loaded onto Red Cross marked ships with many taken through the port of Marseilles, for onward freighting by rail to Geneva, from where they would be sent to various camps by the International Committee of the Red Cross. Barcelona was also used as an Iberian transit port, with Toulon as an alternative French port. The returning ships sometimes carried allied civilians and wounded being repatriated.

The route from Iberia to the South of France was not safe. The Red Cross ship SS Padua was damaged by British bombing in Genoa in 1942 and then sunk by a mine outside Marseilles in October 1943. The SS Embla was bombed by British aircraft on 6 April 1944 causing a fire, and the same ship was attacked again on 20 April 1944, by American B-26 bombers, who this time sank the ship and killed the ICRC agent. On 6 May the "Christina" was attacked while at anchor in Sete. This latest act resulted in the ICRC suspending the route. The Operation Dragoon invasion of Southern France, preliminary bombing in July and the actual invasion in August 1944 put a stop to rail transport and then Marseilles being used by the Red Cross. The SS Vega sailed to the alternative port of Toulon with parcels in November 1944.

On 8 May 1945, it was reported that 7,000,000 parcels, weighing 35,000 tonnes (34,000 long tons; 39,000 short tons) were at sea or in warehouses in Britain, Lisbon, Barcelona, Marseilles, Toulon, Geneva and Gothenburg. A Red Cross representative said that they were not perishable and could be used for distressed civilians and as a flexible reserve.

=== British food parcels ===
During the Second World War, the British Joint War Organisation sent standard food parcels, invalid food parcels, medical supplies, educational books and recreational materials to prisoners of war worldwide. During the conflict, over 20 million standard food parcels were sent. Typical contents of such a parcel included:

- 4 oz (110 g) packet of tea
- Tin of cocoa powder
- Bar of milk or plain chocolate (often Cadbury Dairy Milk Fruit & Nut chocolate, or a similar product)
- Tinned pudding
- Tin of meat roll
- Tin of processed cheese
- Tin of condensed milk (Klim—a Canadian instant milk beverage—or else Carnation or Nestle brand)
- Tin of dried eggs
- Tin of sardines or herrings
- Tin of preserve
- Tin of margarine
- Tin of sugar
- Tin of vegetables
- Tin of biscuits
- Bar of soap
- Tin of 50 cigarettes or tobacco (sent separately—usually Player's brand cigarettes, or Digger flake pipe tobacco).

The Scottish Red Cross parcels were the only ones to contain rolled oats. Approximately 163,000 parcels were made up each week during the Second World War.

Sometimes, due to the shortage of parcels, two or even four prisoners would be compelled to share the contents of one Red Cross parcel.

=== American food parcels ===
The American Red Cross produced 27,000,000 parcels. Even before America entered the war in late 1941, they were supplying, through Geneva, parcels to British, Belgian, French, Polish, Yugoslav, Dutch, Greek, Norwegian, and Soviet prisoners of war. The Philadelphia centre alone was producing 100,000 parcels a month in 1942. A list of the contents of a typical Red Cross parcel received by an American airman held prisoner in Stalag Luft I near Barth, Germany on the Baltic Sea:

- One pound (450 g) can of powdered milk
- One package ten assorted cookies
- One pound (450 g) can of oleo margarine
- Eight-ounce (230 g) package of cube sugar
- Eight-ounce (230 g) package of Kraft cheese
- Six-ounce (170 g) package of K-ration biscuits
- Four-ounce (110 g) can of coffee
- Two D-ration chocolate bars
- Six-ounce (170 g) can of jam or peanut butter
- Twelve-ounce (340 g) can of salmon or tuna
- One pound (450 g) can of Spam or corned beef
- One pound (450 g) can of liver paté
- One pound (450 g) package of raisins or prunes
- Five packages of cigarettes
- Seven vitamin-C tablets
- Two bars of soap
- Twelve-ounce (340 g) of C-ration vegetable soup concentrate.

According to this airman, recipients of these parcels were permitted to keep only the cigarettes and chocolate bars; the remainder of the parcel was turned over to the camp cook, who combined them with the contents of other parcels and German POW rations (usually bread, barley, potatoes, cabbage and horse meat) to create daily meals for the prisoners.

Cigarettes in the parcels became the preferred medium of exchange within the camp, with each individual cigarette valued at 27 cents within Stalag Luft I. Similar practices were followed in other POW camps, as well. Cigarettes were also used to bribe German guards to provide the prisoners with outside items that would otherwise have been unavailable to them. Tins of coffee, which were hard to come by in Germany late in the war, served this same purpose in many camps. Contents of these packages were sometimes pilfered by German guards or other camp personnel, especially toward the end of the war.

=== Canadian food parcels ===
The Canadian Red Cross reported assembling and shipping nearly 16,500,000 food parcels during the Second World War, at a cost of $47,529,000. The Canadian Red Cross Prisoners of War Parcels Committee was led by Chairman Harold H. Leather, M.B.E., of Hamilton, Ontario and Vice Chairman John Draper Perrin of Winnipeg, Manitoba. Contents of the Canadian parcel included:

- One pound (450 g) of milk powder
- One pound (450 g) of butter
- Four ounces (110 g) of cheese
- Twelve ounces (340 g) of corned beef
- Ten ounces (280 g) of pork luncheon meat
- Eight ounces (230 g) of salmon
- Four ounces (110 g) of sardines or kippers
- Eight ounces (230 g) of dried apples
- Eight ounces (230 g) of dried prunes or raisins
- Eight ounces (230 g) of sugar
- One pound (450 g) of jam or honey
- One pound (450 g) of pilot biscuits
- Eight ounces (230 g) of chocolate
- One ounce (28 g) of salt and pepper (mustard, onion powder and other condiments were also sometimes enclosed)
- Four ounces (110 g) of tea or coffee
- Two ounces (57 g) of soap.

Parcels did vary; those delivered to the Channel Islands by the SS Vega in 1945 contained slightly different quantities, both eight oz (230 g) raisins and six oz (170 g) prunes, and marmalade instead of jam.

=== New Zealand food parcels ===
The New Zealand Red Cross Society provided 1,139,624 parcels during the war period, packed by 1,500 volunteers. Prisoners parcels included:

- Six ounces (170 g) of tea
- Nineteen-ounce (540 g) can of corned mutton
- Fifteen-ounce (430 g) can of lamb and green peas
- Eight ounces (230 g) of chocolate
- Twenty ounces (570 g) of butter
- Fifteen ounces (430 g) of coffee and milk
- Ten ounces (280 g) of sugar
- Nine ounces (260 g) of peas
- One pound (450 g) of jam
- One pound (450 g) of condensed milk
- Fifteen ounces (430 g) of cheese
- Six ounces (170 g) of raisins.

Unlike the American and British parcels, Canadian and New Zealand Red Cross parcels did not include cigarettes or tobacco.

=== Indian food parcels ===
Indian parcels, supplied by the Indian Red Cross Society, contained:

- Eight ounces (230 g) fruit in syrup
- One pound (450 g) lentils
- Two ounces (57 g) toilet soap
- One pound (450 g) flour
- 8 biscuits
- Eight ounces (230 g) margarine
- Twelve ounces (340 g) Nestle's Milk
- Fourteen ounces (400 g) rice
- One pound (450 g) pilchard
- Two ounces (57 g) curry powder
- Eight ounces (230 g) sugar
- One ounce (28 g) dried eggs
- Two ounces (57 g) tea
- One ounce (28 g) salt
- Four ounces (110 g) chocolate

Indian parcels did not contain meat or tobacco products.

=== Argentinian bulk parcel ===
The Argentinian Red Cross provided parcels containing:

- Three ounces (85 g) bully beef
- Five ounces (140 g) meat and veg
- Three ounces (85 g) ragout
- Two ounces (57 g) corned mutton
- Four ounces (110 g) pork and beans
- Five ounces (140 g) butter
- Two ounces (57 g) lard
- Two ounces (57 g) honey
- Five ounces (140 g) jam
- Two ounces (57 g) milk jam
- Four ounces (110 g) condensed milk
- Eight ounces (230 g) sugar
- Seven ounces (200 g) cheese
- Eight ounces (230 g) biscuits
- One ounce (28 g) pea and lentil flour
- Three ounces (85 g) chocolate
- Two ounces (57 g) cocoa
- One ounce (28 g) tea
- 1 soap
- Three ounces (85 g) dried fruit

=== South African parcels ===
From the British South African Red Cross.

=== Invalid food parcels ===
Invalid parcels were specifically designed for invalids, i.e. disabled or ill prisoners. The contents varied, but what appears to be a British one contained:

- 2 tins Yeatex
- 3 tins concentrated soup powder
- 1 tin gooseberries
- 1 tin Horlicks
- 1 tin Ovaltine
- 1 tin milk powder
- 2 tins dried eggs
- 1 block of chocolate
- 1 tin cheese
- 1 tin condensed milk
- 2 tins compressed oats
- 4 ounces (110 g) tea
- 1 tin creamed rice
- 1 tin Rowntree's cocoa
- 1 tin lemon curd

=== Food parcels in the Pacific theatre ===
In 1942, permission was granted by Japan for a diplomatically neutral ship, after Japan refused to permit a Red Cross ship to be deployed, to be dispatched to distribute the parcels. A Swedish vessel, the MS Gripsholm delivered 20,000 Red Cross parcels from Canada, America and South Africa and in addition a consignment of 1,000,000 cigarettes. A second voyage was refused.

The Japanese government in August 1942 announced that no neutral ship, even a Red Cross ship, would be allowed to enter Japanese waters. Red Cross parcels intended for Allied POWs in Japan were accordingly stockpiled in Vladivostok, Soviet Union, and a single ship was ultimately permitted to transport some of these to Japan in November 1944, which, in turn were carried by the Japanese vessel Awa Maru, carrying Red Cross markings, in March, 1945, to Singapore. How many of these actually reached the POWs is not known, and the sinking of the Awa Maru on the return trip by a US submarine prevented any future shipments from being made.

At the Changi prison camp run by the Japanese in Singapore, an average POW received a fraction of one food parcel in the three-and-a half years that the camp was open.

=== Food parcels in the German concentration camps ===
In November 1943, the Red Cross received permission from Nazi German authorities to send Red Cross parcels to inmates of concentration camps, but only to those whose names and specific locations were known. By May 1945, 105,000 specific individuals had been identified. About 1,112,000 parcels containing 4,500 tons of food were ultimately sent to the camps, including those at Dachau, Buchenwald, Ravensbrück, Sachsenhausen, Theresienstadt and Auschwitz. In addition to food, these parcels also contained clothing and pharmaceutical items. A majority of the items in the packages were stolen by the SS officers who ran the concentration camps.

=== German POWs after the Second World War ===
Three months after the surrender of Germany in May 1945, General Dwight Eisenhower issued an order classifying all surrendered soldiers within the American Zone of Occupation as Disarmed Enemy Forces, rather than Prisoners of War. Accordingly, the Red Cross was denied the right to visit German POWs in American prison camps, and delivery of Red Cross parcels to them was forbidden. In the spring of 1946, the International Red Cross was finally allowed to provide limited amounts of food aid to prisoners of war in the U.S. occupation zone.

=== Postwar study on Red Cross parcels and Canadian POWs ===
The Canadian government conducted a detailed study of the effect of the Red Cross parcels on the health and morale of Canadian POWs shortly after the end of the Second World War. Over 5,000 former POWs were interviewed, and Canadian authorities determined that a significant number of soldiers did not get the intended one parcel per man per week; most had to make do with one-half of a parcel per week, or even less on some occasions. Soldiers were asked to state their preferences with regard to specific contents of the parcels: the most popular item turned out to be the biscuits, with butter a close second, followed (in order) by meat, milk (powdered and other), chocolate, cigarettes, tea, jam, cereals, cheese and coffee. The Canadian parcel was preferred to British, American or New Zealand-issued parcels, claiming that the Canadian parcels had "greater bulk", "lasted longer", and/or had "more food".

With regard to especially disliked foods, the Canadian respondents (over 4,200 of the interviewed POWs) expressed the greatest distaste for the vegetables and fish enclosed in the food parcels (about fifteen per cent of the total number of respondents), followed (in order) by condiments, egg powder, cereals, fat, cheese, desserts, sweets, beverages, jams, biscuits and milk. However, except for the first two items on that list, all of these were named by only a minuscule percentage of the total number of respondents.

=== Parcels from Red Cross organisations in occupied countries ===
- Belgium sent parcels to their POWs and in addition, family members could send parcels.
- Denmark sent parcels to Danish citizens incarcerated in Nazi concentration camps.
- France sent parcels to their POWs and in addition, family members could send parcels.

== Red Cross medical kits ==
=== American ===
A second type of parcel delivered through the Red Cross during the Second World War was the Red Cross Prisoner of War First Aid Safety Kit, which was supplied by the American Red Cross for distribution through the International Committee. Such parcels generally held the following items:

- A twelve-page booklet with instructions on the use of the enclosed medical supplies, printed in English, French, German, Polish and Serbo-Croatian
- Ten packages of sterilised gauze, in two different sizes
- One package containing 500 laxative pills
- Two packages containing 500 aspirin tablets each
- Twelve gauze bandages
- Two cans of insecticide powder
- Four tubes of boric acid antiseptic ointment
- Two packages containing 500 sodium bicarbonate tablets each
- Two tubes of Salicylic ointment (for treatment of athlete's foot and similar fungal diseases)
- Two tubes of Mercuric antiseptic ointment
- Four tubes of sulphur ointment (for treatment of skin diseases)
- One box containing 100 Band-Aids
- Two rolls of adhesive tape
- Two 1-ounce (28 g) packages of absorbent cotton
- Safety pins, forceps, soap, disinfectants and scissors.

Other kits issued to some POWs through the American Red Cross contained a few differences in contents, but were generally similar to the above.

=== British ===
The British Red Cross also supplied Medical Parcels to Allied PoWs during the war. Prior to 15 June 1942, these kits generally consisted of:

- A general parcel containing cotton wool, safety pins, soap, aspirin tablets and ointment
- A disinfectant parcel
- Special parcels containing thermometers and dressing scissors.

After 15 June 1942, the British kits' contents changed. The new kits contained:

- An invalid food unit consisting of two parcels – milk and food
- A medical stores unit consisting of four parcels:

"Medical 1" contained soap and disinfectant
"Medical 2" contained sodium bicarbonate, Dover's powder, lung balsam, ferric subsulfate solution, zinc ointment, cascara, zinc oxide powder, formalin throat tablets, ammoniated mercury ointment, flexoplast, lint, cotton wool, gauze, vitamin-C tablets, pile ointment, sulphapyridine tablets, magnesium trisilicate, and oxide plaster
"Medical 3 and 4" contained additional quantities of the supplies found in "Medical 2", adding to them kaoline poultice, vitamin A and vitamin D tablets, TCP (antiseptic), aspirin, Bemax, sulphanilamide and toilet paper.

In addition, German and Italian authorities sometimes permitted British prisoner hospitals to procure equipment from England via the Red Cross, including microscopes, sterilisers, material for manufacturing artificial limbs, medical instruments, vaccines, drugs and even games and other recreational materials.

== Release parcels ==
The American Red Cross provided a special "release parcel" to some Allied POWs upon their initial release from enemy captivity. These parcels included:

- Razor
- Razor blades
- Shaving cream
- Toothbrush
- Toothpaste
- Pencil
- Comb
- Socks
- Cigarettes
- Handkerchiefs
- Playing cards
- Stationery
- Book
- Hard candy
- Chewing gum
- Face cloth
- Cigarette case with the American Red Cross emblem imprinted on it.

These kits were distributed as follows: 71,400 to France; 10,000 to the Soviet Union; 9,500 to Italy; 5,000 to Egypt; and 4,000 to the Philippines.

== Modern Red Cross parcels ==
Following the collapse of the Soviet Union in 1991, many pensioners in the newly independent nation of Georgia were left destitute by the resulting collapse of the Georgian economy and the inability of their small pensions to keep up with inflation. The Red Cross, with the financial support of the German government, assisted approximately 500,000 of these mostly elderly people with food parcels over a seven-year period during the 1990s. As of 2001, more than 12,000 were still dependent upon Red Cross food assistance.

Food parcels were also distributed by the Red Cross of Thailand during Red Shirt Movement disturbances in 2006 in Bangkok, and to British victims of flooding in Gloucestershire in 2007. The British package contained:

- Five tins of canned fruit
- One loaf of longlife bread
- Two packets of rye crackers
- Three cartons of long-life milk
- One jar of savoury spread
- Three packets of plain biscuits
- Three tins of fish
- Three tins of meat
- Five tins of potatoes
- Two jars of sandwich spread
- Two packs of cereal bars
- One flashlight, batteries, toilet paper, and one tube of sanitiser hand gel.

== See also ==
- A. Y. G. Campbell, contributed to the creation of Red Cross Food Parcels
- Disaster relief
