= A. Y. G. Campbell =

Indian civil servant

Sir Archibald Young Gipps Campbell
- Born: 18 May 1872
- Died: 30 October 1957 (aged 85)
- Occupation: colonial civil servant

Sir Archibald Young Gipps Campbell KCIE CSI CBE (May 18, 1872 – October 30, 1957) was an Indian civil servant who served as the Law member of the executive council of the Governor of Madras from 1926 to 1928 and Chief Secretary of Madras 1925–1935 and made an important contribution towards the founding of Red Cross Food Parcels in the First World War.

== Early life ==
Archibald Young Gipps Campbell was born in Brighton, England, on May 18, 1872. His father, Archibald Samuels Campbell (1821–1899), had been a Fellow of mathematics at St John's College, Cambridge before going out to Jamaica where the family owned a number of plantations. He returned to England and married Alice Gipps (died 1932) in 1871 at the age of 50 and had three sons (Archibald, Allan, and William) and two daughters (Alice a.k.a. Hilda; and Mary a.k.a. Daisy). Archibald Young Gipps Campbell was the eldest child. Archilbald Samuel Campbell retired to Cambridge and died there in 1899. An obituary appeared in the Eagle, the St John's College magazine, the following year.

Campbell was educated at Westminster School and Trinity College, Cambridge. He inherited his father's talent for mathematics: he won a scholarship to Trinity, where he went on to become a Smith's Prizeman and Tyson Medallist. He passed out 9th in the Mathematical Tripos, and particularly distinguishing himself for his work in cosmology. His undergraduate dissertation on the "Theory of the Composition of the Stars" was outstanding, and on the strength of it, he was elected a Fellow of the Royal Astronomical Society and a member of the Société astronomique de France (French Astronomical Society). Sir Robert Ball, then Lowndean Professor of Astronomy at Cambridge, included his work in his lectures and described him as one of the most brilliant mathematicians of his time.

== Early career ==
The Indian Civil Service was an attractive proposition for the brightest Cambridge graduates in the 1890s. Archibald sat the examinations on graduation in 1895 and came second, only being beaten by Julius Mathison Turing, father of the famous Alan Turing FRS (the cryptologist who led the team who broke the Enigma code at Bletchley Park in the Second World War). Alan Turing's biography mentions that his father was always bitter that Archibald Campbell had been promoted more quickly than he had when they were in India. Turing wrote that he thought Archibald's success over his father's could be put down to the fact that Julius Turing was notably un-diplomatic in dealing with people. He also revealed that his father always referred to Archibald as “XYZ Campbell”. The nickname – no doubt a play on his initials AYG and his penchant for mathematics – seems to have been generally used by everyone, including his family. His sons certainly recalled having called him “XYZ” as children.

Archibald Young Gipps Campbell joined the ICS on 29 October 1896 and arrived in India to take up his post on 3 December of the same year. He was 24 years old. He remained an active member of the Indian Civil Service for the next thirty-four years, ten months and seven days, finally retiring at the age of 58 in January 1935. His rank was initially as an Assistant Collector and Magistrate in the Madras Presidency until his appointment as an Under-Secretary in the Revenue Department in November 1903. Whether Julius Turing had any right to be jealous of XYZ's success in the service is more doubtful. It is true that he eventually reached a very high grade but his promotion record suggests that this was through hard work and long service, not any kind of preferment.

His appointments in the first five years from 1897 to 1902 were as Assistant Collector to the outlying areas of Nellore, Bellary, Onole and Penukonda. His first duty was the relief of the famine in Nellore. In 1902 he was posted to Ooty, preparing the Annual Administration Report and the Manual of Standing Information. In 1903, he was appointed an Under-Secretary in the Revenue Department. A year later, in 1904, he moved to the Public Department where his duties were mainly involved with the creation of suitable ceremonies for public investitures and with the planned visit to Madras of the King-Emperor Edward VII and Queen-Empress Alexandra. In January 1906 he was seconded to escort the Prince of Wales to Madras and in May of the same year he became Private Secretary to the Governor, Sir Arthur Lawley. He continued as such with his successor Thomas Gibson Carmichael. XYZ remained as the Governor's Private Secretary for five years (1906–1911) until after the Delhi Durbar.

During this time, he made many friends in all parts of the Madras government. The nickname “XYZ” given to him by his friends on account of his mathematical prowess, became so universal that on his marriage telegrams addressed to “XYZ Madras” were delivered direct without any delay and even his wife came to call him by that name.

He took his first leave in 1909, returning to the UK for two-and–a-half months. It was presumably during that time that he courted Frances Irene Young. She came to India and they married in Madras in 1910. In January 1911 he was made a Commander of the Order of the Indian Empire (C.I.E.). By that time he was 38 years old and had already served 14 years in India, a third of it in the direct service of the Governor. On 17 January 1911, he was posted to Chittoor as a sub-collector, first grade. There he devoted his attentions to the improvement of roads and bridges and helping the farmers marketing their produce, but before he had made as much progress as he hoped he was recalled to Madras to become President of the Corporation. He was then lent to the Government of India as a member of the Weights and Measures Committee for India and Burma, which involved a visit to that country.

In 1914, both husband and wife returned to the UK on leave. The period of leave allowed his son Archibald Hugh (always known as Hugh) to be born in England. The original plan must have been for the family to return to India but all this was interrupted by the declaration of the First World War.

== Family life ==
Archibald Campbell had married Frances Irene Young in 1910. He was 38 and she was 25. The fact that there was a “Young” in both his name and hers was not a coincidence: they were distant cousins. They were married in Madras by Bishop Whitehead in Fort St George. They went on to have three sons: Archibald Hugh (always known as Hugh), Colin Alan George and Niall Patrick (always known as Patrick). Hugh was born in 1914, followed by Colin in 1917. There was then a gap before the youngest Patrick was born in 1925. No doubt part of the reason for the gap was separation. Initially Archibald and Irene had lived together in Madras, but they were in England on leave in 1914 when the First World War broke out and the family only returned to Madras after Armistice in November 1918. However it was a short stay. In 1920 Irene decided that the pressures of Archibald's job and his other commitments meant that the family were better off in England and she moved back permanently. Thereafter she may have come out to India to see him, possibly while the children were at boarding school, but he only came back on his extended periods of leave and then only very rarely. In 1926 Irene and Archibald bought a house in England. It was called Flowers Court and was in Pangbourne. It acted as the family home for the next 26 years. In 1952 when they moved to Burghfield near Reading. The sons were all sent to boarding school in England (Winchester). All three subsequently went on to Trinity College, Cambridge.

The period of leave in the Indian Civil Service was normally 8 months in every three years to allow English civil servants to return to England and see their families. He returned to England in 1921, 1924 and 1928 but that was the last time. Colin remembered that when he was 18 when he drove to the station to collect his father on his final return after retirement, he had not seen his father since he was eleven years old.

== First World War ==
When war was declared in 1914, Archibald was back in England on leave. He had been a keen volunteer soldier in India, serving as a major in the Southern Provinces Mounted Rifles and earning a Volunteer Decoration for his work. He now sought to get involved in the army but his age worked against him, so instead he turned to his old Governor, Sir Arthur Lawley. Lawley had been appointed Commissioner of the Red Cross in France and he appointed XYZ as Financial Secretary and Secretary of the General Commission. Archibald Campbell had an extraordinary ability at organisation. Sir Robert Hudson, Treasurer of the Commission, described his work as Financial Secretary as one of the best bits of finance he had ever seen. Sir Arthur Stanley (Chairman of the Joint War Committee of the British Red Cross Service) later stated that the committee “fully realised how much of the success of our work in France is due to his efforts and his great organising ability”.

Worthy as this was, his greatest contribution was yet to come. He was recalled to India on expiry of his leave, but before he could set sail he was once more borrowed, this time at the instigation of Lord Northcliffe, by the War Office and the Red Cross to conduct a joint enquiry into the condition and feeding of British prisoners of war in Germany. XYZ's report recommended the unification of the many associations providing food for the prisoners of war in Germany under the headship of Central Prisoners of War Committee and he was duly appointed to personally undertake this task. Offices were taken in 4 Thurloe Place, London and the committee was chaired by Sir Leander Starr Jameson, leader of the famous Jameson Raid in 1896 and later Prime Minister of Cape Colony. Major Campbell, as he was then known, was thus directly responsible for inventing and implementing the Red Cross food parcel. This was perhaps his single greatest achievement and the one for which he most deserves to be remembered. Nor did it go unrecognised at the time: he was made a Knight of Grace of the Order of St John of Jerusalem for this work in 1916 and in 1920 received a CBE for it, “as Founder and Organiser of the Central Prisoners of War Organisation”. After the work was completed he was finally and urgently recalled to India.

== Return to India ==
XYZ returned to India on 9 January 1917 as a Collector second grade in Krishna district based in Machilipatnam. From 3 January 1919 he returned to Madras and was appointed Secretary to the Revenue Department and from 22 November he was on special duty as Director of Industries and in 1920 he was put in charge of the office of the Director of Fisheries (presumably while the latter was on leave). In 1922 he was involved in an inquiry into the excessive costs of government in Coorg and made the third member of the Board of Revenue. He became the second member in 1925 and on 3 March 1925 was appointed Chief Secretary to the Government. He had by that time spent half his life in India. He was 52 years old. In 1928, he succeeded T. R. Venkatarama Sastri as the acting law member in the Governor's executive council. and a permanent member in 1930. He remained Chief Secretary until 1935, not returning to England at all for the last 7 years. He received the Companion of the Star of India on 1 January 1927 and on 1 January 1932 in the new year's honours list he was made Knight Commander of the Most Eminent Order of the Indian Empire (K.C.I.E). He was by then 60 years old and would normally have retired but there was no-one able to take his place and his retirement was deferred for a further three years. Madras Province in the British Raj was larger than Tamil Nadu covering 142,000 square miles (370,000 km^{2}) and having a population of 38 million people. On retirement XYZ finally left India. He had been married there and one of his children had been born there. He had spent 34 years in India when leave was taken into account.

== Retirement and legacy ==
Archibald Campbell retired to England and spent a brief period during the Second World War in Jamaica winding down the plantations there. He died on 30 October 1957. His children had children of their own. His life had been recorded in Who's Who and he was buried in a small grave in Lochgair, Scotland. There is another memorial. During the 1930s, he had been invited by a group Muslim people for the opening ceremony of their new village when he stayed in Mylapore, Chennai. and the village was named as "Campbellabad" which is located in Tuticorin district, Tamil Nadu, India. His name was added to their village name as a tribute.

== Sources ==
- Great Britain India Office (1905). The India List and India Office List. London: Harrison and Sons. p. 455.
- Henry James Lee (1920). History of the Campbell family. Polk. pp. 146.
- Family papers, chiefly manuscript biography written by his son Colin Campbell
- Who was Who
