= Radio Belgique =

Radio Belgique Radio België
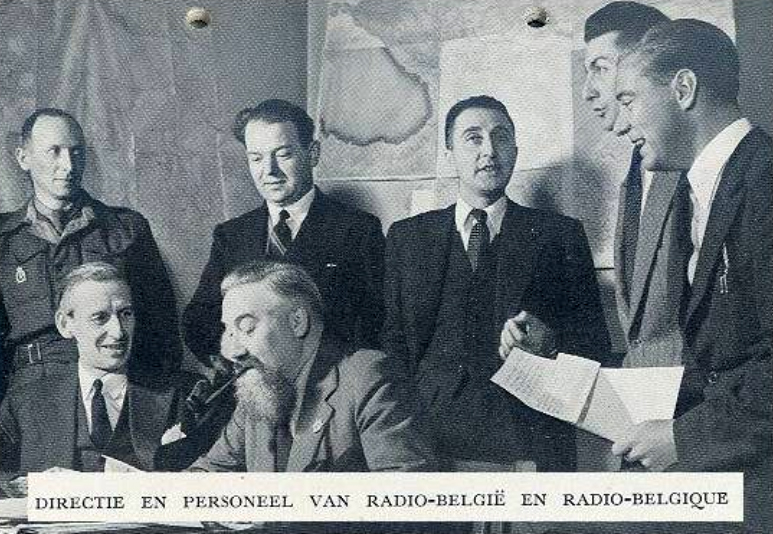
- London; United Kingdom
- Broadcast area: Belgium

Programming
- Languages: French and Dutch
- Affiliations: Belgian government in exile

Ownership
- Owner: BBC European Service
- Sister stations: Radio Londres; Londoner Rundfunk

History
- First air date: 28 September 1940
- Last air date: 16 September 1944

Radio Belgique (French) and Radio België (Dutch) were radio broadcasts transmitted to German-occupied Belgium from London during World War II. It was produced with the support of the Belgian government in exile and formed part of the BBC's European Service.

== Background ==
On 10 May 1940, neutral Belgium was invaded by German forces. After 18 days of fighting, the Belgian army, along with King Leopold III, surrendered and the country was placed under German occupation. The Belgian government fled, first to France and then to the United Kingdom, where it formed a government in exile in London. The national Belgian radio station, the National Institute of Radio Broadcasting (INR-NIR) sabotaged its transmitters and was banned by the Germans though many of INR's employees followed the government to London.

== Radio Belgique ==
Radio Belgique was established on 28 September 1940 and broadcast in French and Dutch. The French service was put under the control of Victor de Laveleye (a former Liberal government minister), while Jan Moedwil was put in charge of the Dutch service. A press agency, INTERBEL, was founded for the radio, as a continuation of the pre-war BELGA agency.

On 14 January 1941, the former Belgian cabinet minister Victor de Laveleye, known for inventing the V for Victory campaign, became the announcer on Radio Belgique and began encouraging the use of the V Symbol in occupied Belgium. De Laveleye was also responsible for inventing one of the station's most notable slogans: "We will get them, the Boches" ("We krijgen ze wel, de moffen" in Dutch; "On les aura, les Boches" in French). In 1942, Charles de Gaulle gave a speech on Radio Belgique, celebrating Franco-Belgian friendship.

Though forbidden by the German occupiers, Radio Belgique was listened to by a majority of Belgians, far more than officially approved stations (like Radio Bruxelles) which broadcast German propaganda. The journalist and former resistance member Paul Lévy also worked at Radio Belgique.

Radio Belgique's programmes were broadcast in both French and Dutch. Originally, the programmes were broadcast from 21:00 to 21:15 each evening in French and Dutch on alternate days, but from Spring 1941, a morning edition and separate 17:30 programme allowed at least one in each language per day. From March 1943, the BBC broadcast daily programmes from Radio Belgique at 19:15 (in French) and 20:30 (in Dutch).

== German response ==
Recognizing the potential effect that Radio Belgique could have on their control of information in the occupied country, the Germans rapidly created collaborationist radio stations, also aimed at a Belgian audience, using the remaining assets of the INR, the Francophone Radio Bruxelles ("Radio Brussels") and Dutch language Zender Brussel. The Germans set up radio jammers to disrupt the signal and made listening to Radio Belgique illegal in December 1940.

== Radiodiffusion National Belge ==
During the later stages of World War II, the Belgian government sponsored the creation of a new radio broadcaster, Radiodiffusion National Belge (RNB), which broadcast from London, New York City, and later from Léopoldville in the Belgian Congo. However, it only began to be received in Belgium from September 1944 during the liberation and soon afterwards Radio Belgique was removed from the air.

== See also ==
- Radio Londres
- Radio Oranje
- Radio Congo Belge
