= Victor de Laveleye =

Belgian tennis player and minister

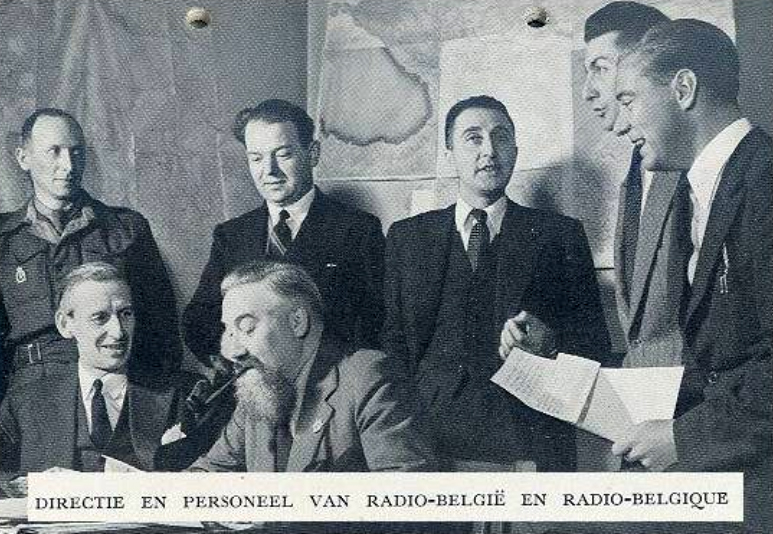
- de Laveleye seated left, London 1944
- Born: Victor Auguste de Laveleye; 5 November 1894; Brussels, Belgium
- Died: 14 December 1945 (aged 51); Ixelles, Brussels, Belgium
- Occupation: politician

Victor Auguste de Laveleye (6 November 1894 – 14 December 1945) was a Belgian liberal politician and minister, as well as an Olympic tennis player. He also served as announcer on Radio Belgique during World War II.

De Laveleye was a doctor in law, and was municipality Council member of Sint-Gillis, President of the Liberal Party (1936–1937) and Liberal member of parliament (1939–1945) for the district Brussels. De Laveleye was minister of justice (1937) and of public education (1944–1945). During World War II, he was a newsreader for Radio Belgique, a BBC station transmitted to occupied Belgium.

== Biography ==
Victor de Laveleye was born in Brussels on 6 November 1894. He was the son of Auguste-Albert and Emma Lynen, who belonged to a well-known liberal family in Antwerp. He also was a great nephew of the Liege professor Émile Louis Victor de Laveleye. He studied law at the Free University of Brussels (ULB) and became a lawyer at the Brussels Court of Appeal.

In 1926, he became a municipal councilor in Saint-Gilles, Brussels. He also gave lectures at the ULB and was a reporter at the Liberal Congress in 1932. He became a member of parliament, chairman of the Liberal Party (1936–1937), and for a few months Minister of Justice in Paul Van Zeeland's second government (1937).

In 1940, he fled to London via France. At the end of July 1940, he received a proposal to take charge of the BBC broadcasts intended for German-occupied Belgium. On 28 September 1940, the first broadcast of Radio Belgique was aired.

== V sign ==
In a radio broadcast on 14 January 1941, de Laveleye asked all Belgians to use the letter "V" as a rallying sign, being the first letter of victoire (victory) in French and of vrijheid (freedom) in Dutch. This was the beginning of the "V campaign," which saw "V" graffiti on the walls of Belgium and later all of Europe, and introduced the use of the "V sign" for victory and freedom. Winston Churchill adopted the sign soon afterwards, though he sometimes got it the wrong way around by displaying the back of his hand, a gesture that is widely used in Great Britain as a lewd and vulgar insult (it means "fuck off").

== Later life ==
After the liberation, Victor de Laveleye became Minister of Public Education in the governments of Pierlot V and VI, which lasted only five months (September 1944 – February 1945). He was already ill and on 16 December 1945, being 51 years old, he died.

== Sports ==
He competed for Belgium in tennis at the 1920 and 1924 Summer Olympics and was an alternate, who did not play, on the Belgian 1928 hockey team. He was nephew of Baron Edouard de Laveleye, chairman of the Belgian Olympic Committee.
