= V sign =

Hand sign (victory, peace or insult)

✌o

V sign
- In Unicode: U+270C ✌ VICTORY HAND

Different from
- Different from: U+1F594 🖔 REVERSED VICTORY HAND

Related
- See also: U+262E ☮ PEACE SYMBOL; U+1F54A 🕊 DOVE OF PEACE

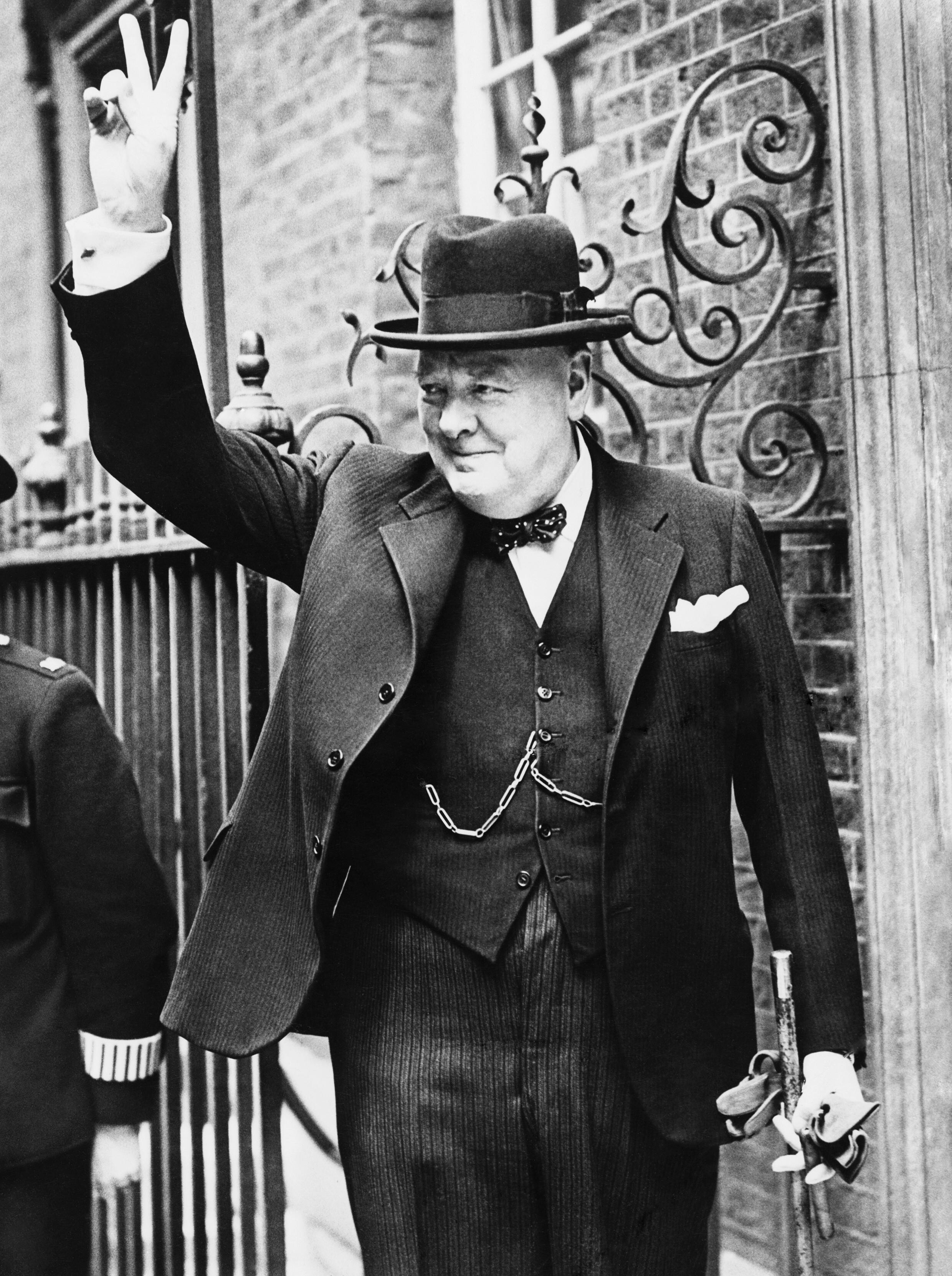
The British Prime Minister Winston Churchill using the V sign. (Pictured in 1943) It is often interpreted as indicating the word "victory" which was widely used when the Allies won World War II.

The V sign is a hand gesture in which the index and middle fingers are raised and parted to make a V shape while the other fingers are clenched. It has various meanings, depending on the circumstances and how it is presented.

When displayed with the palm inward toward the signer, it can be an offensive gesture in some Commonwealth nations (similar to showing the middle finger), dating back to at least 1900. When given with the palm outward, it is to be read as a victory sign ("V for Victory"); this usage was introduced in January 1941 by Victor De Laveleye as part of a campaign by the Allies of World War II, and made more widely known by Winston Churchill. During the Vietnam War, in the 1960s, the "V sign" with palm outward was widely adopted by the counterculture as a symbol of peace and still used today worldwide as the "peace sign".

== Usage ==
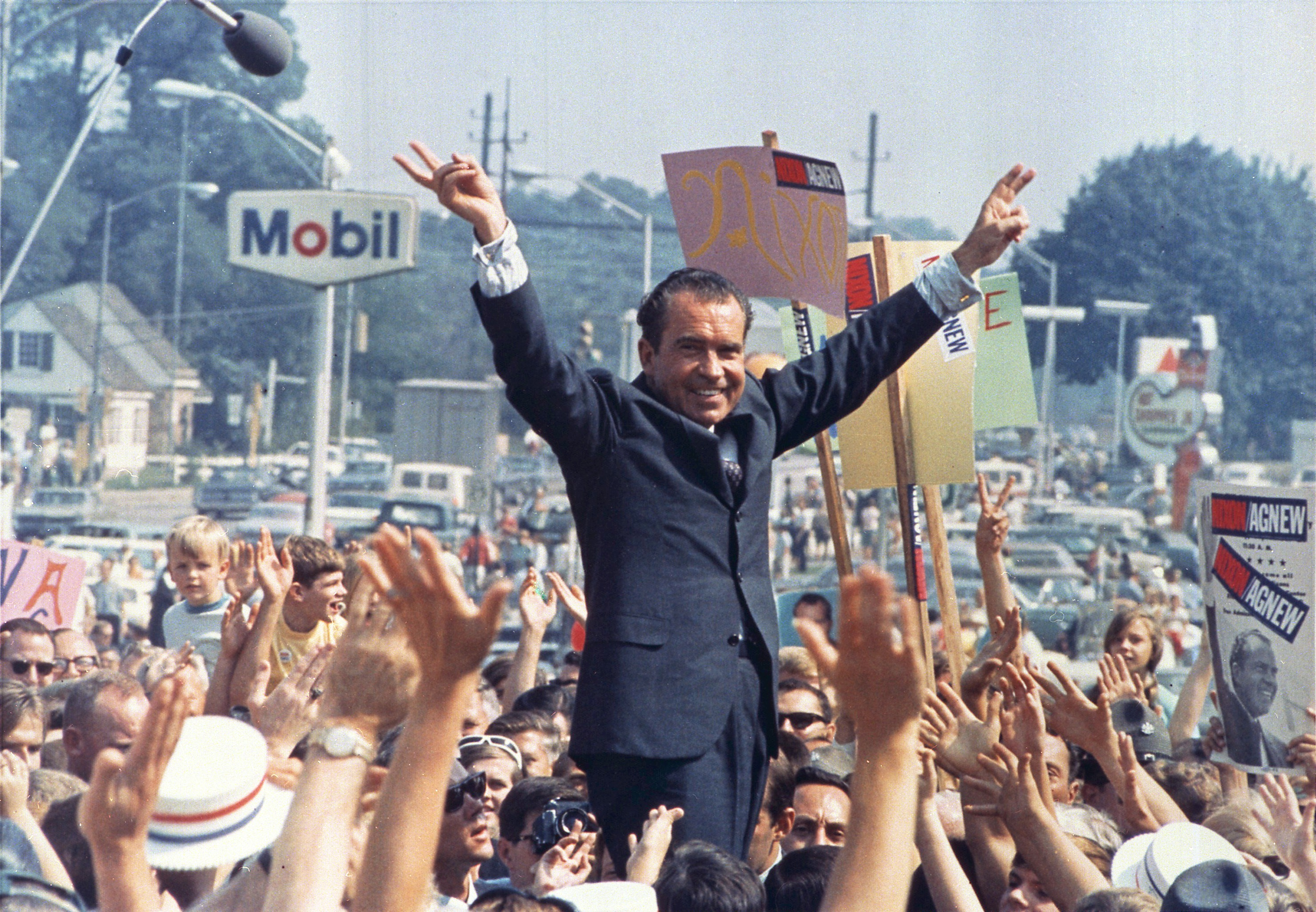
U.S. presidential candidate Richard Nixon using the gesture as a victory sign in 1968

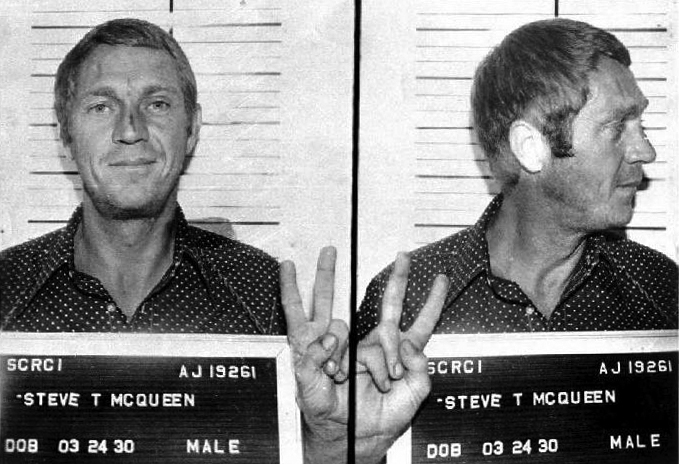
Actor Steve McQueen making the V sign (for peace) during a mug shot, after a drunk driving arrest (1972)

The meaning of the V sign is partially dependent on the manner in which the hand is positioned.

With the palm of the hand facing inward toward the signer (i.e. with the back of the hand facing the observer), this is seen as an insulting gesture in Great Britain, Ireland, Australia, New Zealand and South Africa, akin to giving the finger.

With the palm outward toward the observer, it can mean "victory", in a setting of wartime or competition. This was first introduced in January 1941 by Victor de Laveleye, a Belgian politician in exile, who suggested it as a symbol of unity in a radio speech, representing V for victoire in French and vrijheid in Dutch, meaning freedom, during Belgian radio program broadcast to the German-occupied country by the BBC. Subsequently the BBC began adopting it as a general sign off across all its programming.

It is sometimes made using both hands with upraised arms as United States president Dwight Eisenhower and, in imitation of him, Richard Nixon, used to do. This sign came to mean "peace" or "friend", used around the world by peace and counter-culture groups; popularized in the American peace movement of the 1960s. The commonality with the symbol's use from the 1940s was its meaning the "end of war".

In American Sign Language, the number 2 is signalled with two fingers raised and the palm towards the signer, the letter V with the palm away, and the ordinal second with the sign palm forward before being turned (yawing) until the palm faces backward. General finger-counting systems (mainly ones that start with the index finger) use either facing for the number 2.

The V shape is also used in a number of signs in many sign languages, including (in American Sign Language) "to look" (with the palm down) or "to see" (palm up). When the pointer and middle fingers are pointed at the signer's eyes then turned and the pointer finger is pointed at someone it means "I am watching you."

The V sign while in motion is used in air quotes, flexing the fingers, palm out, of one or both hands.

== As an insult ==
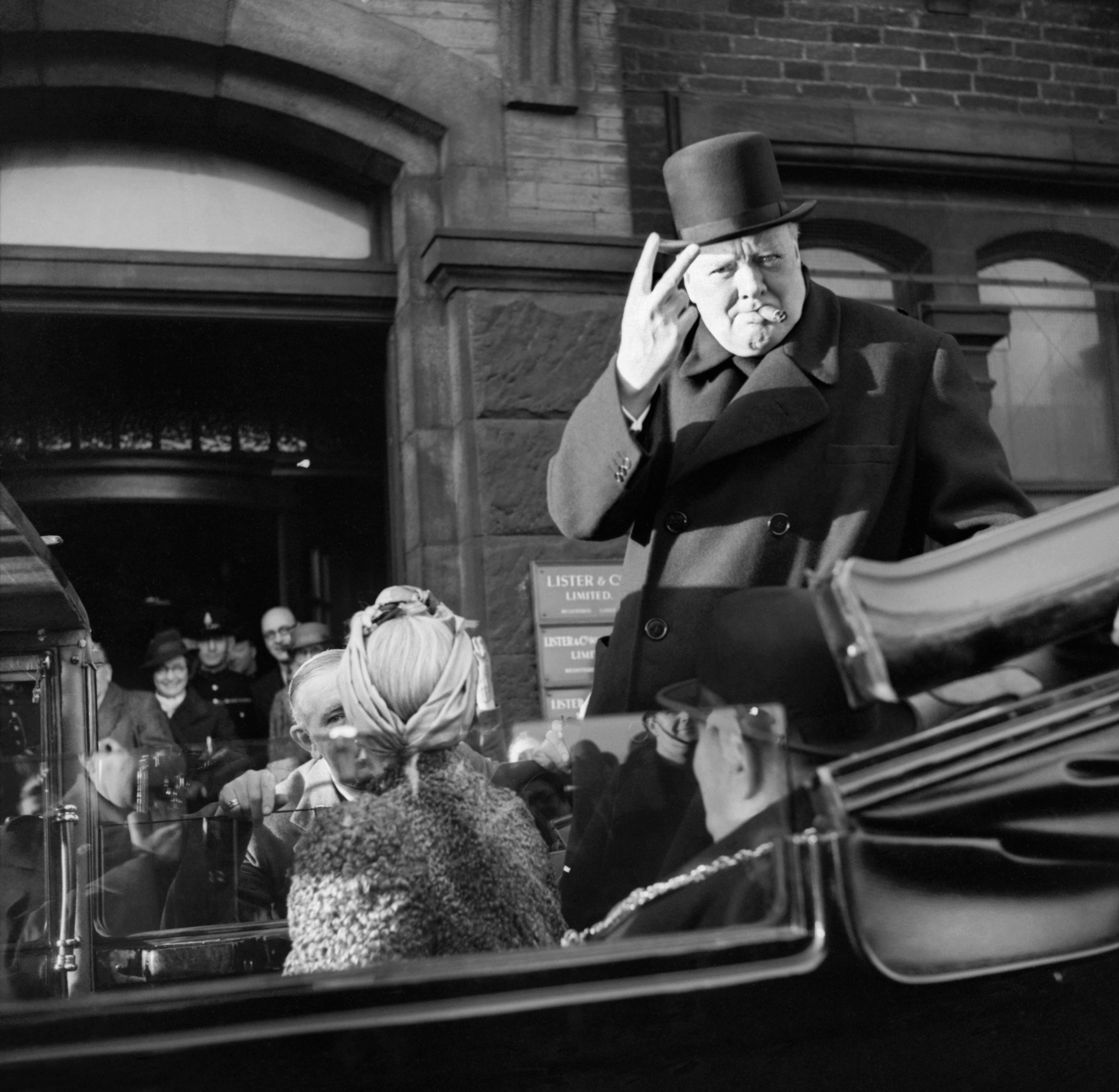
Churchill was initially unaware of the offensive meaning of holding up his hand like in this gesture (1942).

The insulting version of the gesture (with the palm inward U+1F594 🖔 REVERSED VICTORY HAND) is often compared to the offensive gesture known as "the finger". The "two-fingered salute" (also "the forks" in Australia) is commonly performed by flicking the V upwards from wrist or elbow. The V sign, when the palm is facing toward the person giving the sign, has long been an insulting gesture in the United Kingdom, and later in Ireland, Australia, New Zealand and South Africa. It is frequently used to signify defiance (especially to authority), contempt, or derision. It was known in Canada with the meaning "Up yours!" as late as to the generation which fought in World War II, perhaps because of their familiarity with the Victory sign throughout the war years. However, subsequent generations seldom use it, and its meaning in this sense is becoming increasingly unknown in Canada.

A modern publication, Memoirs of Billy Hands, affirms that the V sign was used in Birmingham in the 1780s, when parents taught their children to use the offensive gesture toward the scientist, heretic and political radical Joseph Priestley, whenever they saw him walking through Digbeth. This gesture is called the 'Bishop's Counterblessing.'

An Anglican Bishop blesses their congregation by raising the first two fingers of their right hand, palm facing outwards, and drawing the fingers down as if drawing God’s blessing down from Heaven. In the same way, in the bishops’ counterblessing, the first two fingers are raised, but knuckles facing outwards, and drawing the fingers up as if drawing damnation up from the bowels of Hell.

As an example of the V sign (palm inward) as an insult, on 1 November 1990, The Sun, a British tabloid, ran an article on its front page with the headline "Up Yours, Delors" next to a hand making a V sign protruding from a Union Jack cuff. The article attracted complaints about alleged Francophobia, which the Press Council rejected after the newspaper stated that the paper reserved the right to use vulgar abuse in the interests of Britain.

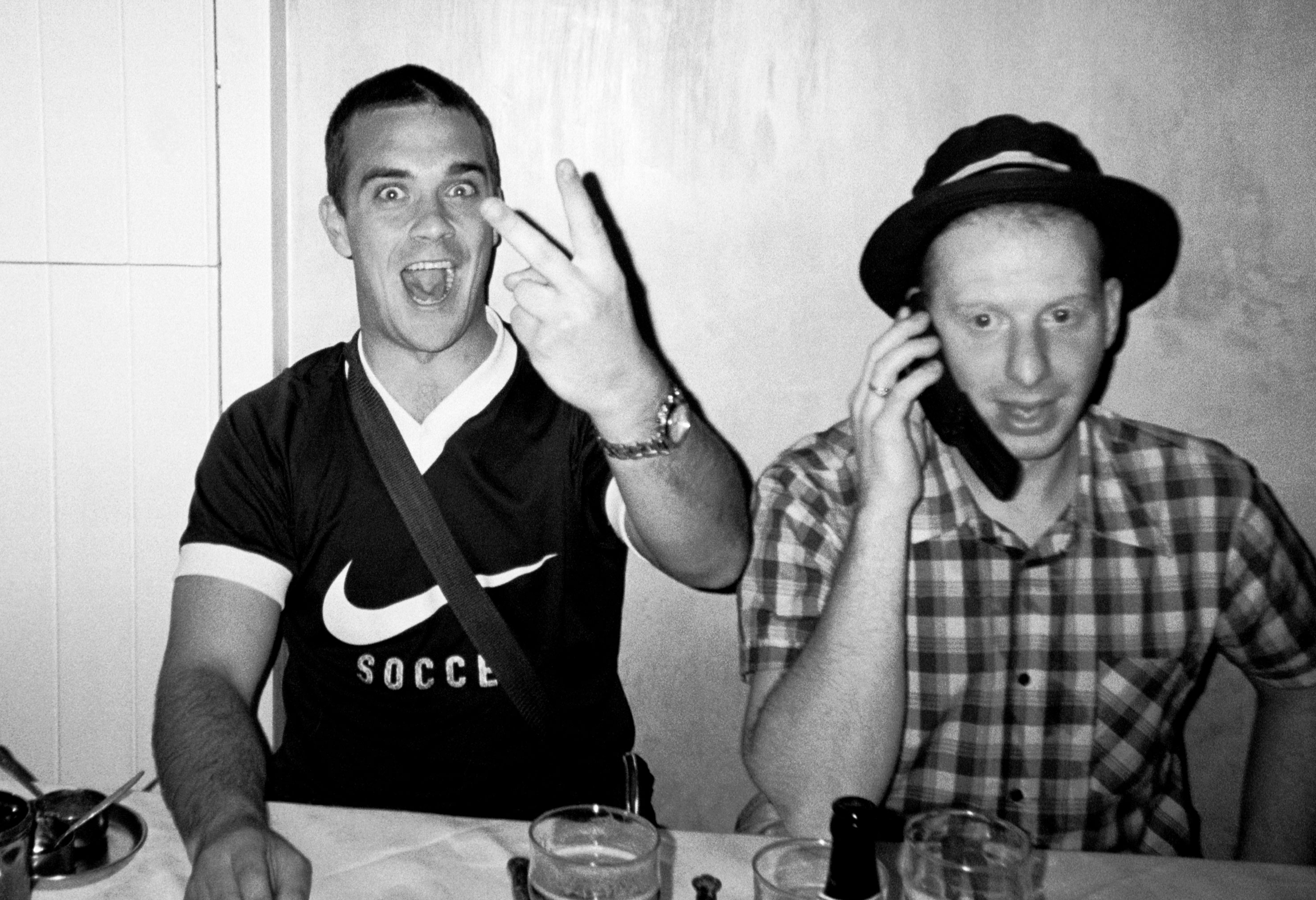
British singer-songwriter and entertainer Robbie Williams does the reversed V sign at a paparazzo photographer in London in 2000.

On 3 April 2009, Scottish association football players Barry Ferguson and Allan McGregor were banned from the Scotland national squad for showing the V sign while sitting on the bench during the game against Iceland. Both players had been drinking alcohol in their hotel bar after a defeat to The Netherlands until around 11 am the next morning, meaning that both of the players breached the SFA discipline code before the incident as well, but the attitude shown by the V sign was considered to be so rude that the SFA decided to exclude those players from the national team. Their club side Rangers fined both Ferguson and McGregor, and removed the club captaincy from Ferguson, as a result of the controversy. McGregor's ban was lifted by Scotland manager Craig Levein in 2010 and he returned to the Scottish national squad.

Steve McQueen gives the sign in the closing scene of the 1971 motorsport film, Le Mans. A still picture of the gesture was recorded by photographer Nigel Snowdon and has become an icon of both McQueen and the film itself.

For a time in the UK, "a Harvey (Smith)" became a way of describing the insulting version of the V sign, much as "the word of Cambronne" is used in France, or "the Trudeau salute" is used to describe the one-fingered salute in Canada. This happened because, in 1971, show-jumper Harvey Smith was disqualified for making a televised V sign to the judges after winning the British Show Jumping Derby at Hickstead. His win was reinstated two days later. Harvey Smith pleaded that he was using a Victory sign, a defence also used by other figures in the public eye.

Sometimes overseas visitors to the countries mentioned above use the "two-fingered salute" without knowing it is offensive to the natives, for example when ordering two beers in a noisy pub, or in the case of the United States president George H. W. Bush, who, while touring Australia in 1992, attempted to give a "peace sign" to a group of farmers in Canberra—who were protesting about U.S. farm subsidies—and instead gave the insulting V sign.

=== Origins ===
A commonly repeated legend claims that the two-fingered salute or V sign derives from a gesture made by Welsh longbowmen fighting in the English army at the Battle of Agincourt (1415) during the Hundred Years' War, but no written historical primary sources support this contention. This origin legend states that Welsh archers believed that those who were captured by the French had their index and middle fingers cut off so that they could no longer operate their longbows, and that the V sign was used by uncaptured and victorious archers in a display of defiance against the French. In conflict with this origin myth, the chronicler Jean de Wavrin, contemporary of the battle, reported that Henry V mentioned in a pre-battle speech that the French were said to be threatening to cut off three fingers (not two) from captured bowmen. Neither Wavrin nor any contemporary author reported the threat was ever carried out after that nor other battles, nor did they report anything concerning a gesture of defiance.

The first unambiguous, attested evidence of the use of the insulting V sign in the United Kingdom dates to 1901, when a worker outside Parkgate Ironworks in Rotherham used the gesture (captured on the film) to indicate that he did not like being filmed.

Peter Opie interviewed children in the 1950s and observed in The Lore and Language of Schoolchildren (1959) that the much-older thumbing of the nose (cocking a snook) had been replaced by the V sign as the most common insulting gesture used in the playground.

Between 1975 and 1977, a group of anthropologists including Desmond Morris studied the history and spread of European gestures and found the rude version of the V-sign to be basically unknown outside the British Isles. In his Gestures: Their Origins and Distribution, published in 1979, Morris discussed various possible origins of this sign but came to no definite conclusion:

Because of the strong taboo associated with the gesture (its public use has often been heavily penalised). As a result, there is a tendency to shy away from discussing it in detail. It is "known to be dirty" and is passed on from generation to generation by people who simply accept it as a recognised obscenity without bothering to analyse it... Several of the rival claims are equally appealing. The truth is that we will probably never know...

== Victory sign ==
=== Second World War: V for Victory campaign ===
On 14 January 1941, Victor de Laveleye, former Belgian Minister of Justice and director of the Belgian French-language broadcasts on the BBC (1940–1944), suggested in a broadcast that Belgians use a V for victoire (French: "victory") and vrijheid (Dutch: "freedom") as a rallying emblem during the Second World War.

In the BBC broadcast, de Laveleye said that "the occupier, by seeing this sign, always the same, infinitely repeated, [would] understand that he is surrounded, encircled by an immense crowd of citizens eagerly awaiting his first moment of weakness, watching for his first failure." Within weeks chalked up Vs began appearing on walls throughout Belgium, the Netherlands and Northern France. Buoyed by this success, the BBC started the "V for Victory" campaign, for which they put in charge the assistant news editor Douglas Ritchie posing as "Colonel Britton". Ritchie suggested an audible V using its Morse code rhythm (three dots and a dash). As the rousing opening bars of Beethoven's Fifth Symphony had the same rhythm, the BBC used this as its call-sign in its foreign language programmes to occupied Europe for the rest of the war. The more musically educated also understood that it was the Fate motif "knocking on the door" of Nazi Germany.. The BBC also encouraged the use of the V gesture introduced by de Laveleye.

By July 1941, the emblematic use of the letter V had spread through occupied Europe. On 19 July, Prime Minister Winston Churchill referred approvingly to the V for Victory campaign in a speech, from which point he started using the V hand sign. Early on he sometimes gestured palm in (sometimes with a cigar between the fingers). Later in the war, he used palm out. After aides explained to the aristocratic Churchill what the palm in gesture meant to other classes, he made sure to use the appropriate sign. Yet the double entendre of the gesture might have contributed to its popularity, "for a simple twist of hand would have presented the dorsal side in a mocking snub to the common enemy". Other Allied leaders used the sign as well.

The Germans could not remove all the signs, so they adopted the V Sign as a German symbol, sometimes adding laurel leaves under it, painting their own Vs on walls and vehicles and adding a massive V on the Eiffel Tower.

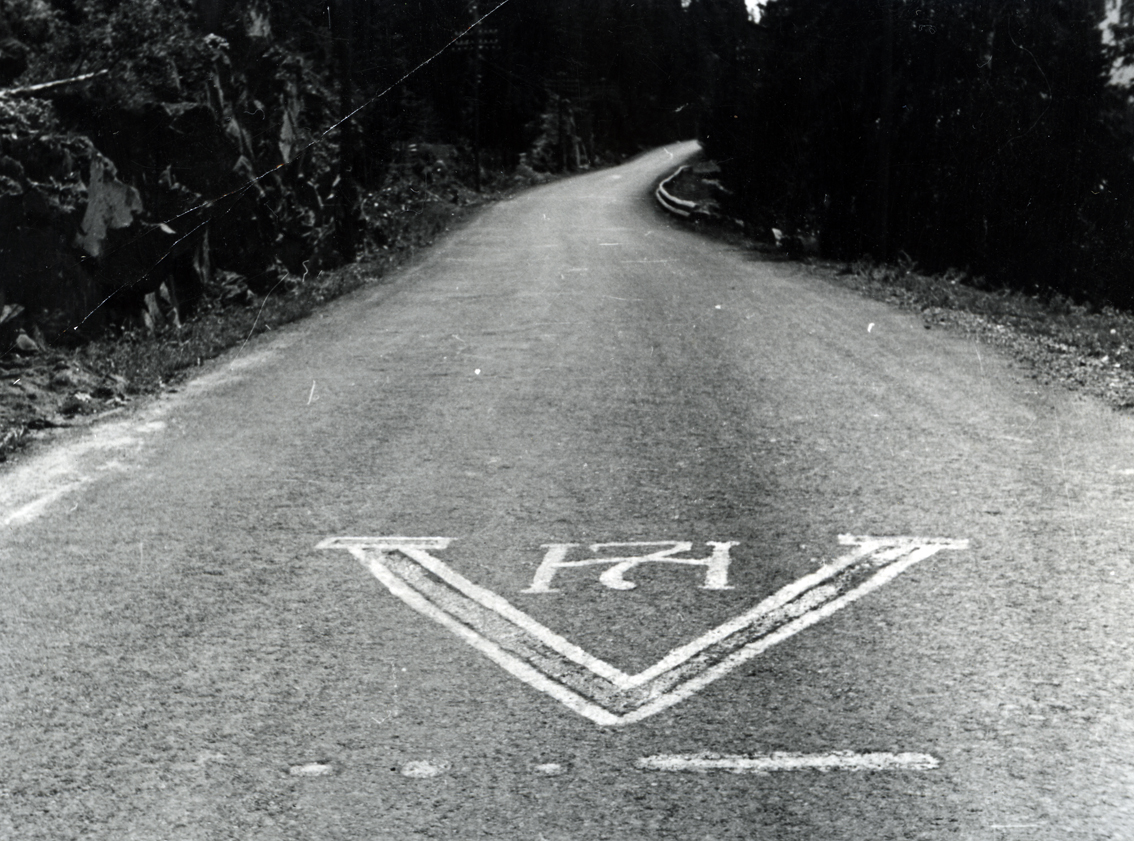
Resistance graffiti on a Norwegian road, depicting the V-sign, "V" in Morse Code, and the royal cipher of King Haakon VII

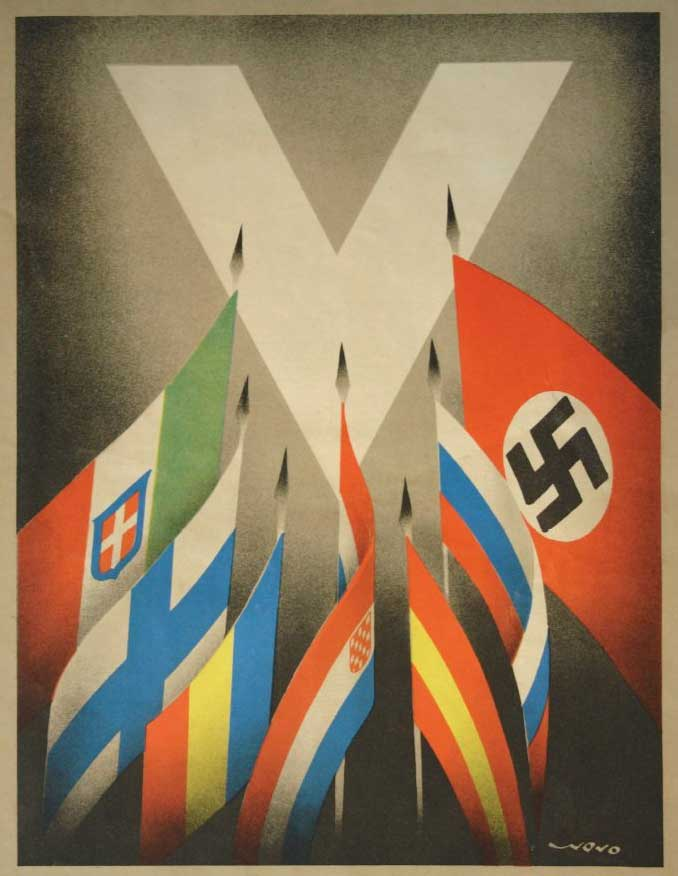
1941 postcard from the Independent State of Croatia, as part of the Axis attempt to appropriate the "V" for themselves

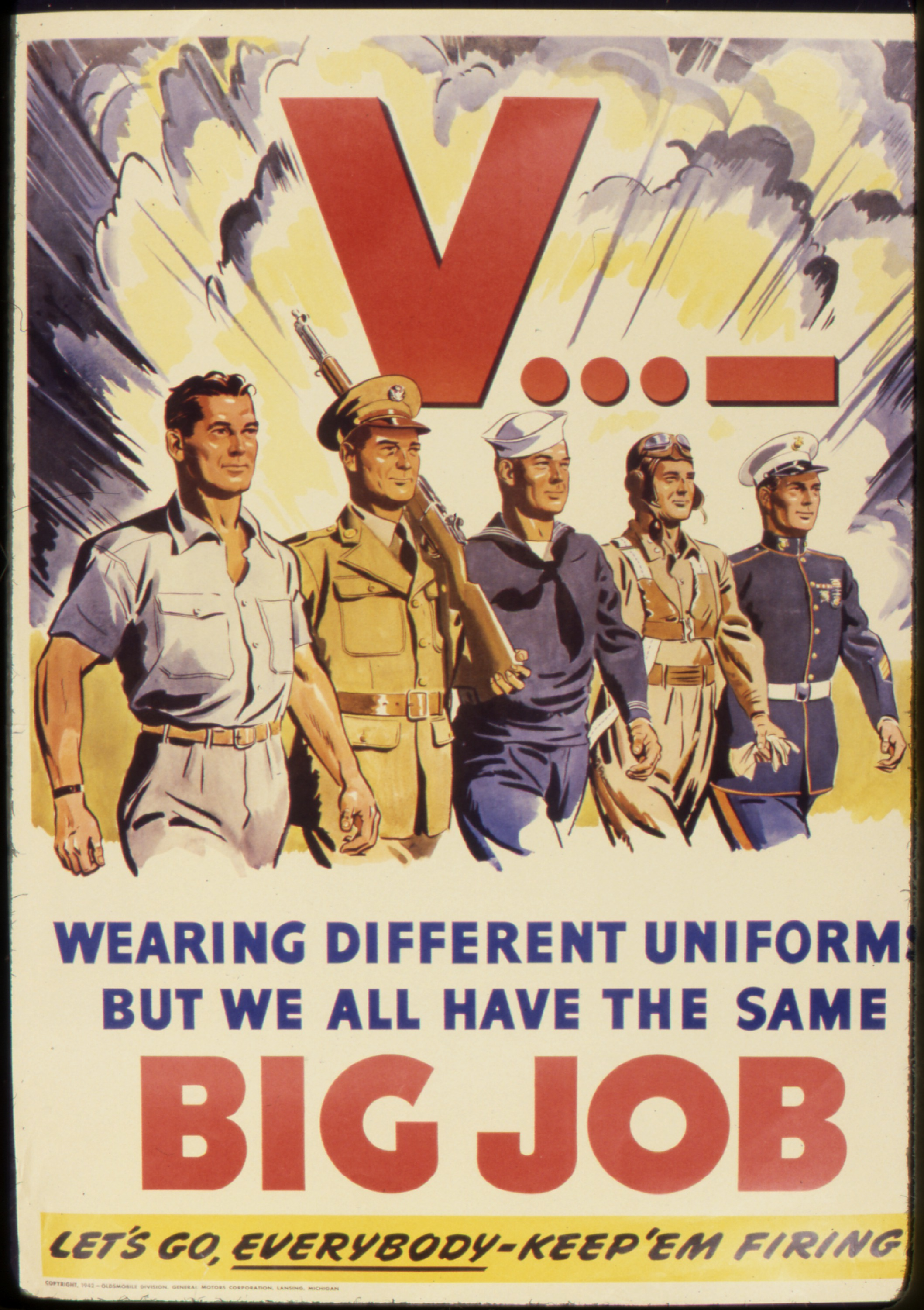
The V-sign (and its Morse code equivalent) incorporated on an American propaganda poster for the War Production Board, 1942 or 1943

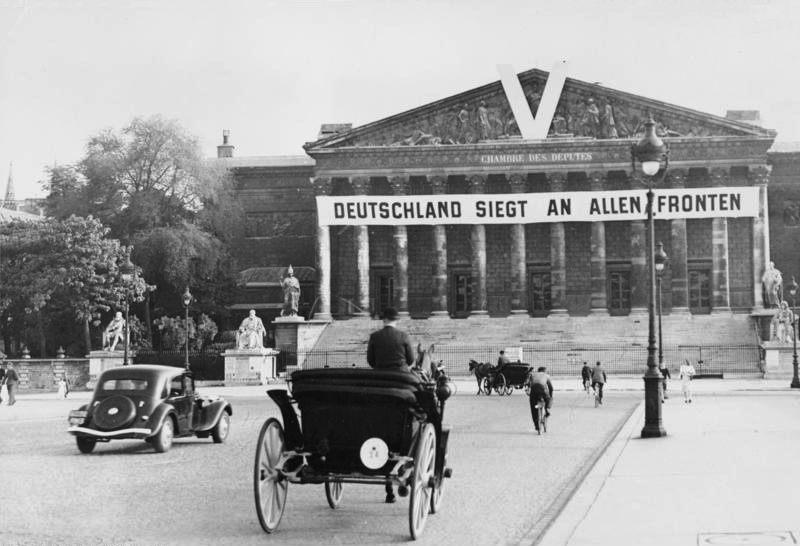
A German V-sign and slogan on the Palais Bourbon, the seat of the French Parliament, in occupied Paris. The banner beneath the "V" reads "Germany is Victorious on All Fronts".

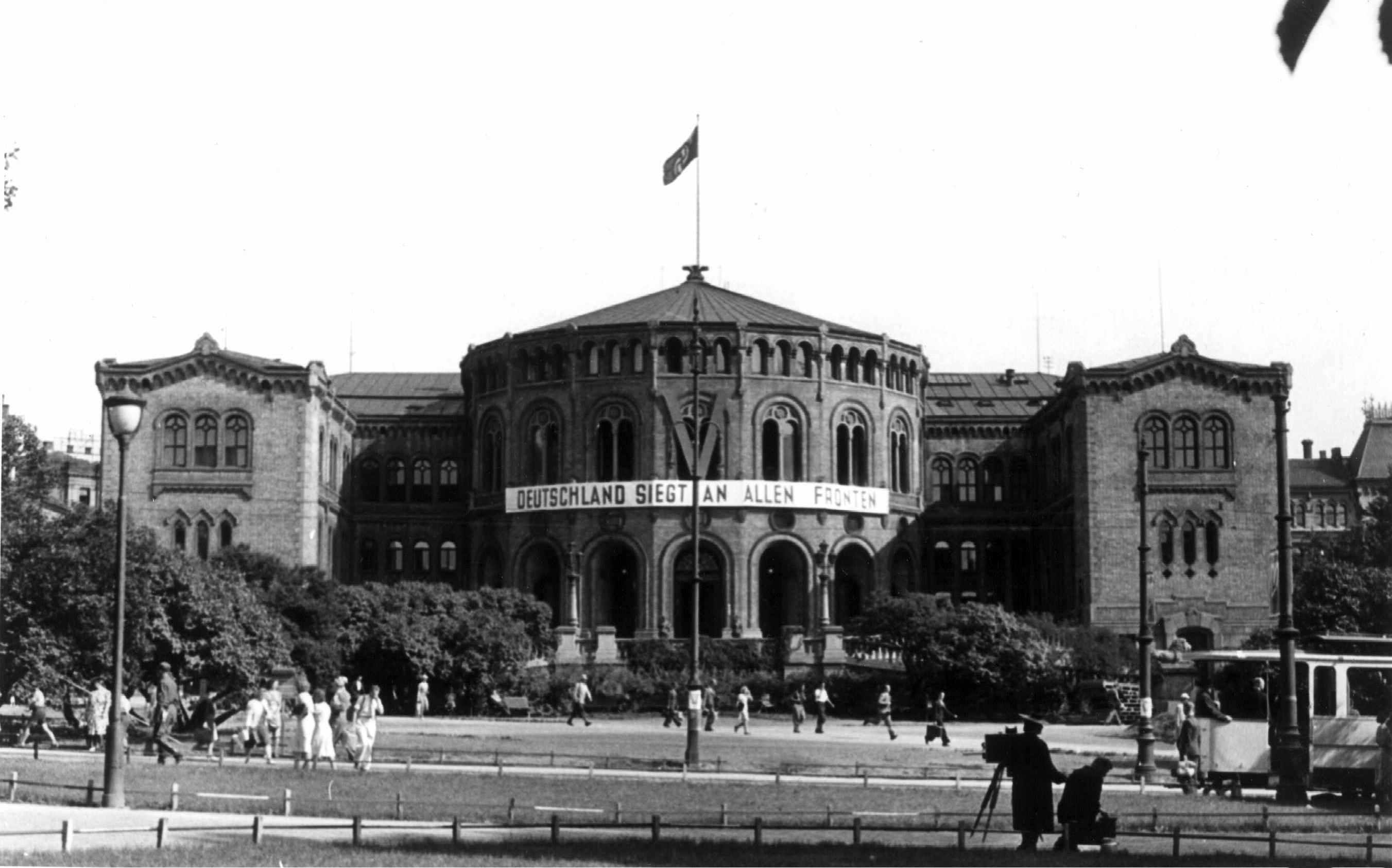
Similar signs were installed on the Storting building, seat of the Norwegian parliament, in occupied Oslo.

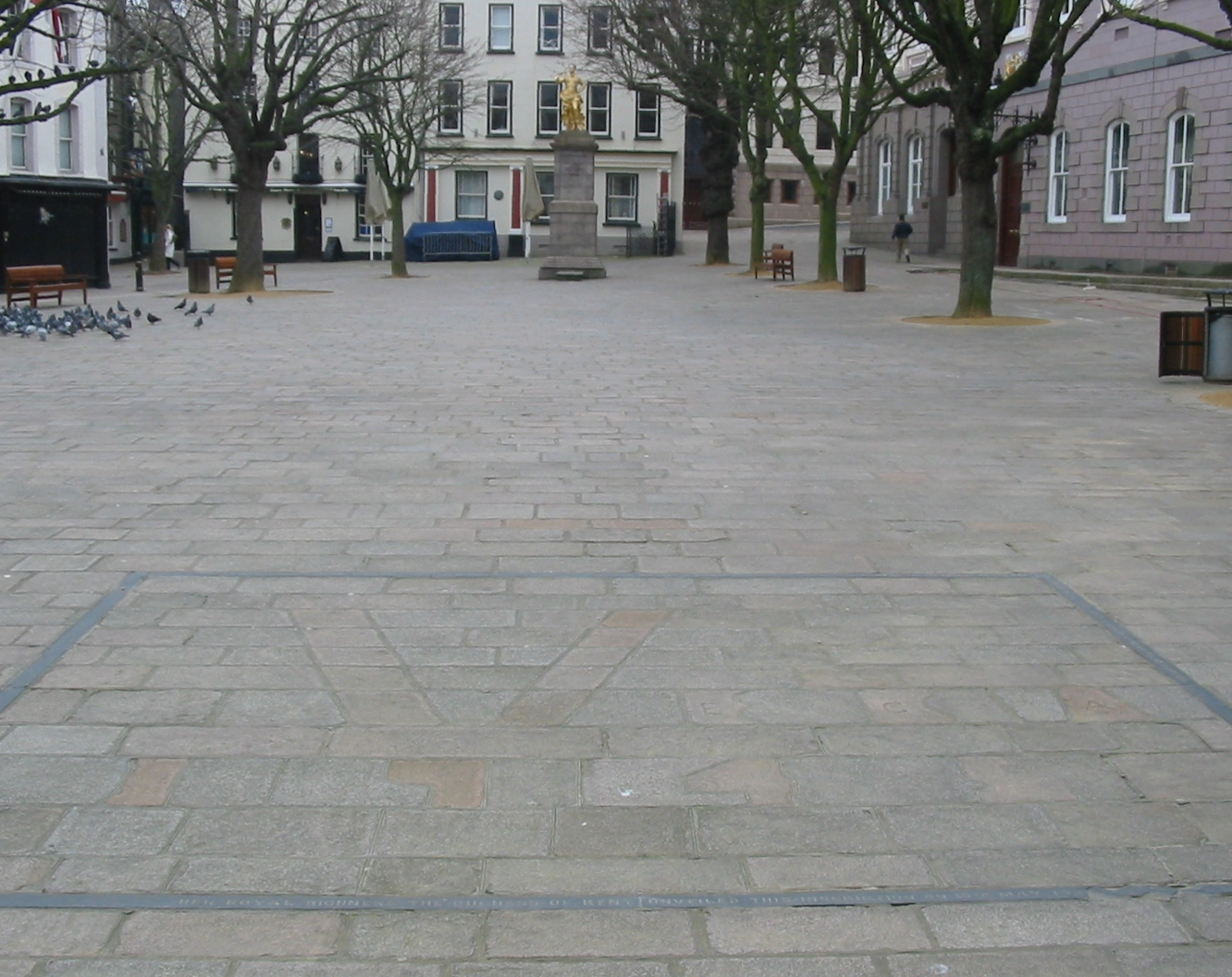
During the German occupation of Jersey, a stonemason repairing the paving of the Royal Square incorporated a V for victory under the noses of the occupiers. This was later amended to refer to the Red Cross ship Vega. The addition of the date 1945 and a more recent frame has transformed it into a monument.

In 1942, Aleister Crowley, a British occultist, claimed to have invented the usage of a V-sign in February 1941 as a magical foil to the Nazis' use of the swastika. He maintained that he passed this to friends at the BBC, and to the British Naval Intelligence Division through his connections in MI5, eventually gaining the approval of Winston Churchill. Crowley noted that his 1913 publication Magick (Book 4) featured a V-sign and a swastika on the same plate.

=== Vietnam War, victory, and peace ===
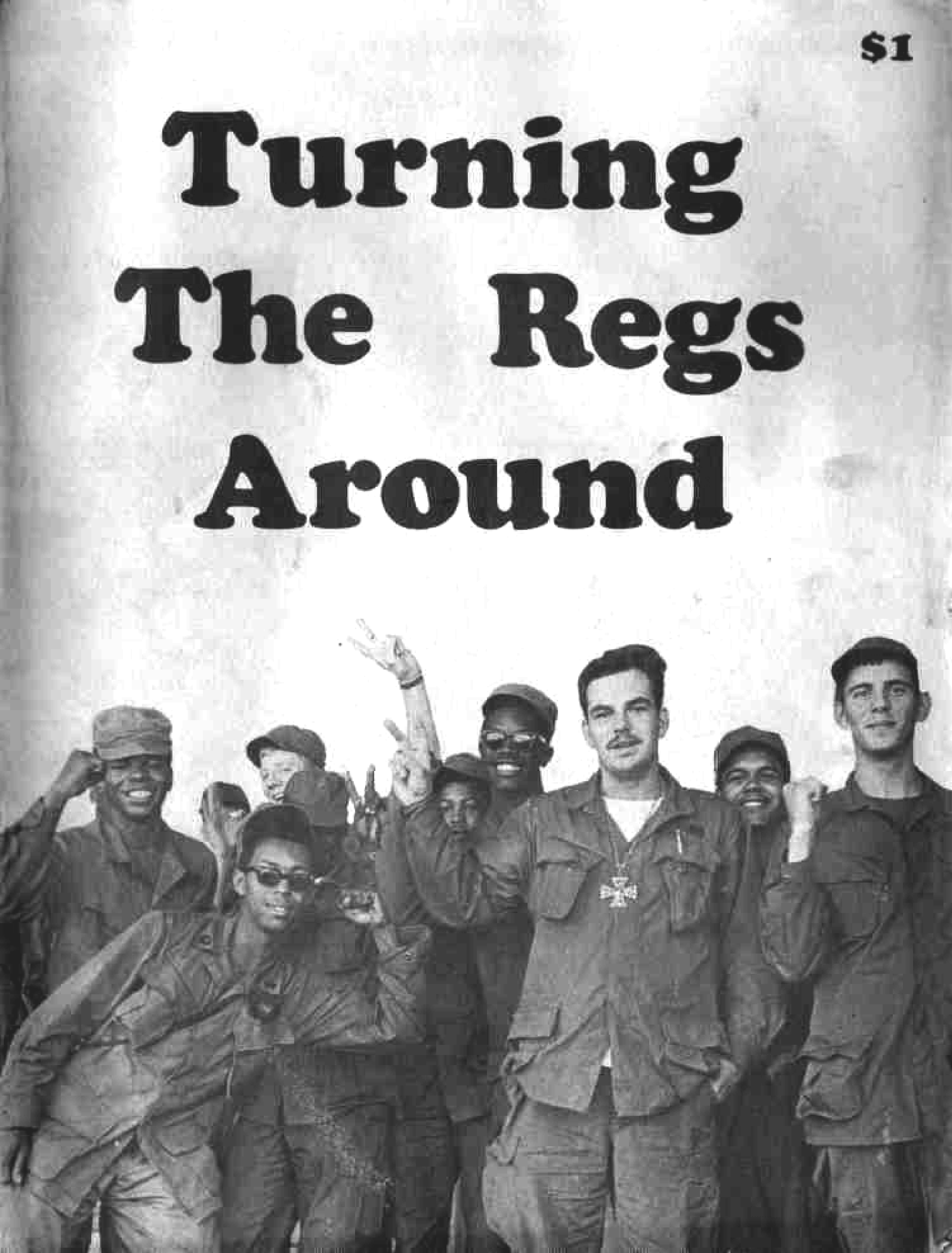
GIs using the peace sign on Turning the Regs Around (1973)

Protesters against the Vietnam War (and subsequent anti-war protests) and counterculture activists in the 1960s adopted the gesture as a sign of peace. Because the hippies of the day often flashed this sign (palm out) while saying "Peace", it became popularly known (through association) as "the peace sign".

== As a photography pose ==
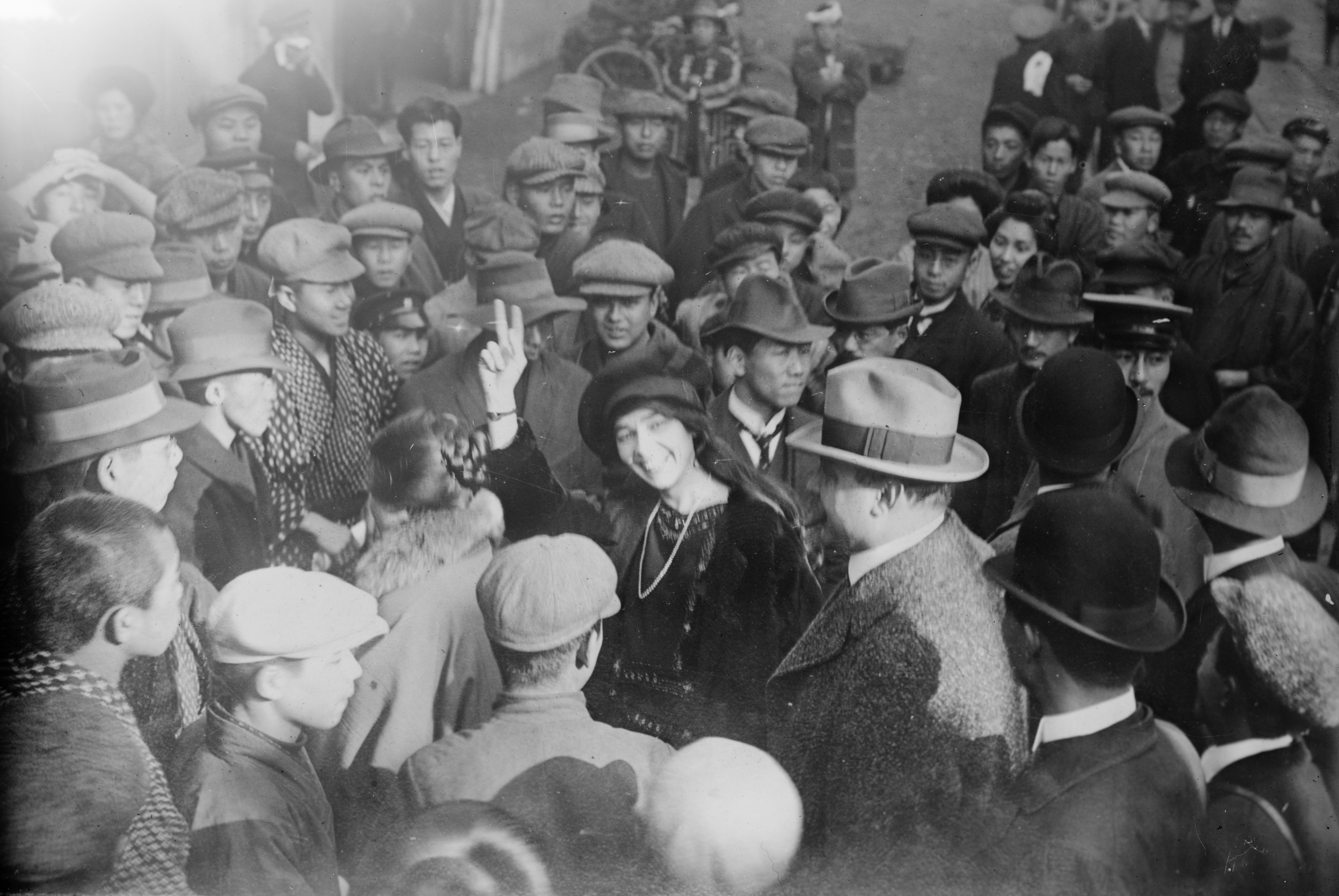
American aviator Katherine Stinson flashes a clearly understood V sign for the cameras 25 years before Winston Churchill as she arrives in Tokyo December 1916 on "barnstorming" tour.

=== Japan ===
The V sign, primarily palm-outward, is very commonly made by Japanese people, especially younger people, when posing for informal photographs, and is known as pīsu sain (ピースサイン; peace sign), or more commonly simply pīsu (ピース; peace). As the name reflects, this dates to the Vietnam War era and anti-war activists, though the precise origin is disputed. The V sign was known in Japan from the post-World War II Allied occupation of Japan, but did not acquire the use in photographs until later.

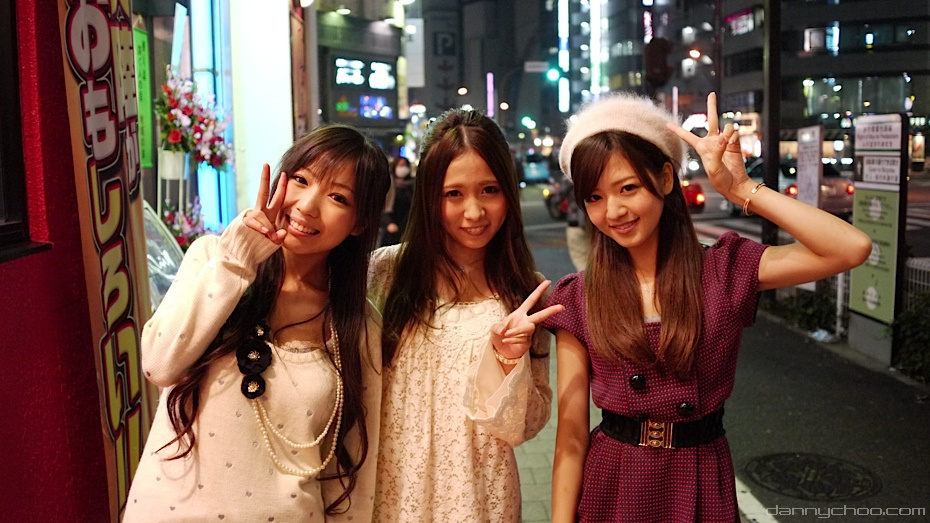
Young Japanese women giving V gesture in Ikebukuro (2010)

In Japan, it is generally believed to have been influenced by Beheiren's anti-Vietnam War activists in the late 1960s and a Konica camera advertisement in 1971. A more colorful account of this practice claims it was influenced by the American figure skater Janet Lynn during the 1972 Winter Olympics in Sapporo, Hokkaidō. She fell during a free-skate period, but continued to smile even as she sat on the ice. Though she placed third in the competition, her cheerful diligence and persistence resonated with many Japanese viewers. Lynn became an overnight foreign celebrity in Japan. A peace activist, Lynn frequently flashed the V sign when she was covered in Japanese media, and she is credited by some Japanese for having popularized its use since the 1970s in amateur photographs.

=== Risks ===
In addition to the risks due to different interpretations of the V-sign in different cultures, it has been suggested that fairly close photographs of palm-out V-signs may be a security risk, as people's fingerprints can be clearly identified, facilitating misuse. At a distance of 1.5m or less, 100% of a fingerprint can be captured, and 50% at up to 3m. Criminals could copy the fingerprint to use with door-access and payment systems. It is also possible for law enforcement to identify people this way; Carl Stewart was arrested in 2021 after police identified his fingerprints in an image he shared on EncroChat. Sufficiently detailed fingerprint information could only be harvested in "very demanding" conditions; to check that a V-sign photograph is not a security risk, it could be examined at high zoom.

== Specific uses ==
=== Africa ===
- In South Africa, after the National Party won the 1948 election with fewer voters than the opposition, Vs appeared as graffiti representing the word "Volkswil" (will of the people) and thereby questioning the results.

=== Asia ===
- In Tamil Nadu, a state of India, it refers to the political party AIADMK.
- The V sign, especially when printed in green, is a sign of the Iranian Green Movement.
- In the Philippines, the symbol was associated with the Marcos family when Ferdinand Marcos Sr. used the gesture during his four presidential campaigns. His son and namesake, President Bongbong Marcos, his electoral alliance, and his supporters used the "V sign" gesture as the official identity of their political campaign during the 2022 presidential elections.

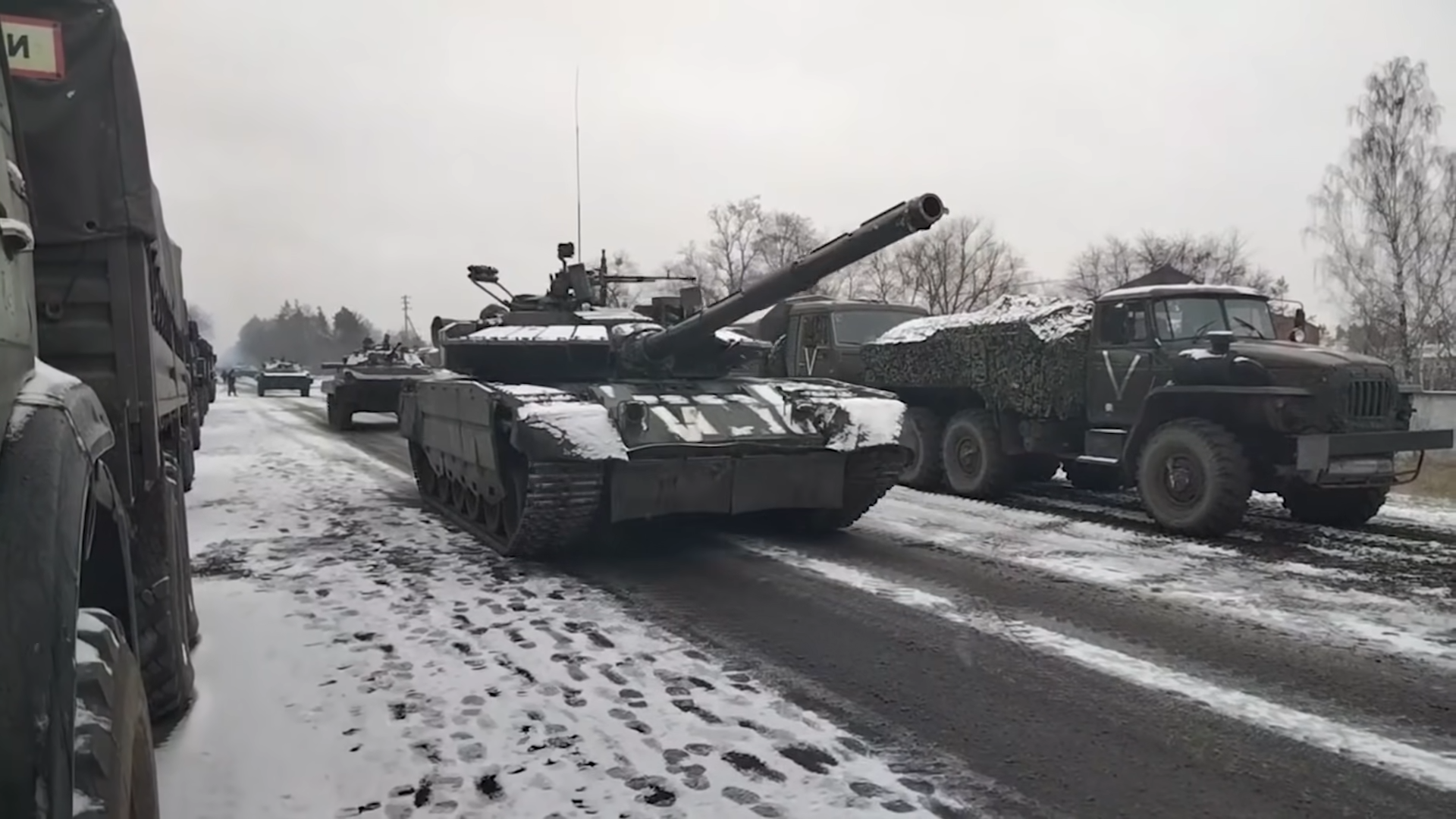
A T-80 with the "V" symbol, entering Kyiv Oblast during the Russian invasion of Ukraine

- In Russia, during the Russian invasion of Ukraine, the Russian forces have used symbols such as Z and V as markings on military vehicles.
- In Vietnam, the V sign means "hello" since the Vietnamese word for the number "2" (hai) sounds like the English pronunciation of the greeting "hi".
- In Indonesia, candidate of the 2014 Indonesian presidential election Joko Widodo used the sign for a political campaign. The V sign in Indonesia is called "Salam Dua Jari".
- In Turkey, using the Victory sign can lead to a prosecution and conviction if it is shown, because in Turkey the sign is associated with the PKK if used by Kurds.
- The V sign was used by many protestors during the 1989 Tiananmen Square protests and massacre

=== Europe ===
- In Poland, during the Solidarity movement, protesters showed the V sign meaning they would defeat Communism. After partially free elections, when Tadeusz Mazowiecki was chosen as prime minister (24 August 1989), he went to the MPs with the V sign, which was transmitted on TV. It is sometimes shown during debates about the fall of Communism.
- In Romania, the sign represents victory and has been used as an extension of the Roman salute to announce that victory has been achieved. It was used heavily during the Romanian revolution after the ousting of Nicolae Ceaușescu. Mircea Dinescu appeared in the first transmission of Romanian Television after the revolutionaries occupied it, shouting "We won!" and flashing the victory sign.
- During the Yugoslav Wars, Croatian and Bosnian troops and paramilitary militia used the sign as a greeting or an informal salute. U.S. and NATO peacekeepers stationed in Bosnia were forbidden from using the V-sign (victory symbol) to avoid upsetting or offending Serbs they might encounter.
- A partially obscured V sign can be added to someone else's head to produce devil's horns or "bunny ears" for an amusing photo. In September 2013, Manu Tuilagi apologised to Prime Minister David Cameron after making a "bunny ears" sign behind his head in a photo taken during a visit by the British and Irish Lions squad to Downing Street.
- In Belgium, the New Flemish Alliance (N-VA) political party uses it as a rallying gesture. During the taking the oath of the actual Belgian federal government, three N-VA ministers used the V sign instead of the formal three-fingers sign.
- On the six-month anniversary of the 2022 Russian invasion of Ukraine, a sculpture giving an inward-facing V-sign, which the BBC described as "the 'up yours' sign", was displayed in front of the Russian embassy in Prague.

=== North America ===
- The original poster for the 2003 film What a Girl Wants showed star Amanda Bynes giving a V sign as an American girl visiting London. In the US, the poster was altered to instead show Bynes with both arms down, to avoid giving the perception that the film was criticizing the then-recently commenced Iraq War.
- The Kendall Motor Oil brand logo has been using the V sign since 1928 to signify becoming the first Pennsylvania refiner to offer a highly refined product good for 2,000 miles.
- University of Southern California, University of Virginia, The University of Texas Rio Grande Valley, and Villanova University students, alumni, and fans "throw their Vs up" by tradition and as a sign of pride in their university and its athletic teams. The V sign in this form frequently accompanies the motto "Fight On!" at USC.
- Following the first elections in Iraq after the U.S. invasion, a photo of a woman showing the V sign with one of her fingers dipped in purple ink became very well-known and was widely circulated. The ink is used to identify individuals who have already voted.

=== South America ===
- In Argentina, the V sign, besides "victory", is linked to the political movement of Peronism, associated with the return of Juan Domingo Perón to Argentina from exile in 1973.

=== Other ===
- Ringo Starr of the Beatles uses the V sign extensively while using the phrase "Peace and Love" as a sort of catchphrase.
- A vulgar gesture signifying cunnilingus is to put the V sign with the fingers on either side of the mouth (usually with the knuckles facing the observer) and to stick the tongue out. Most of the time the tongue is wriggled around.
- Some motorcyclists greet each other using the V sign on the road.
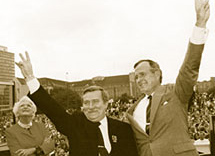
Lech Wałęsa and George H. W. Bush, July 1989

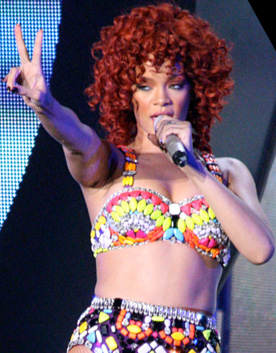
Singer Rihanna using the V sign, 2011

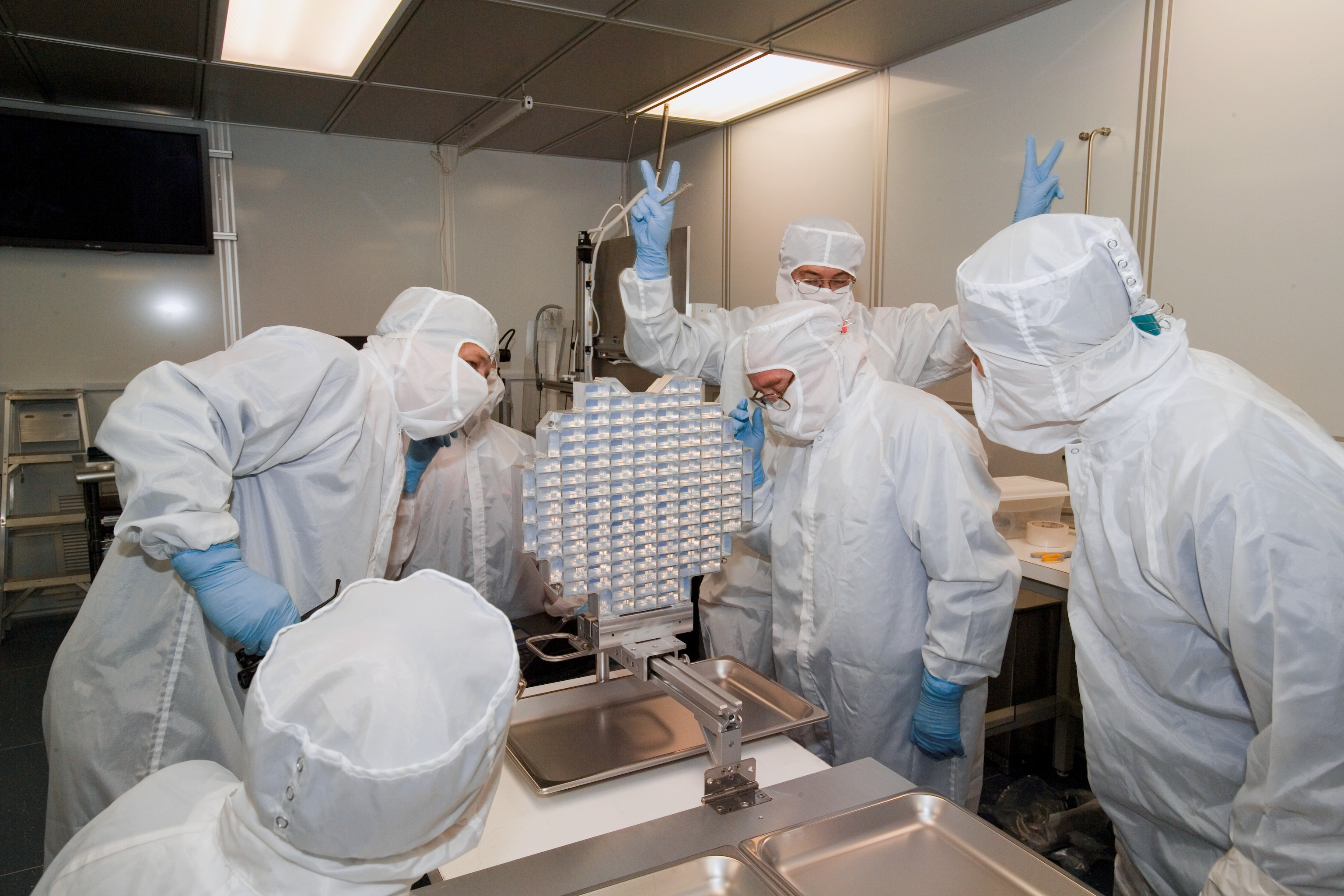
An investigator flashes V-for-victory signs upon the 2006 arrival of material gathered by the Stardust spacecraft at the Johnson Space Center in Texas.

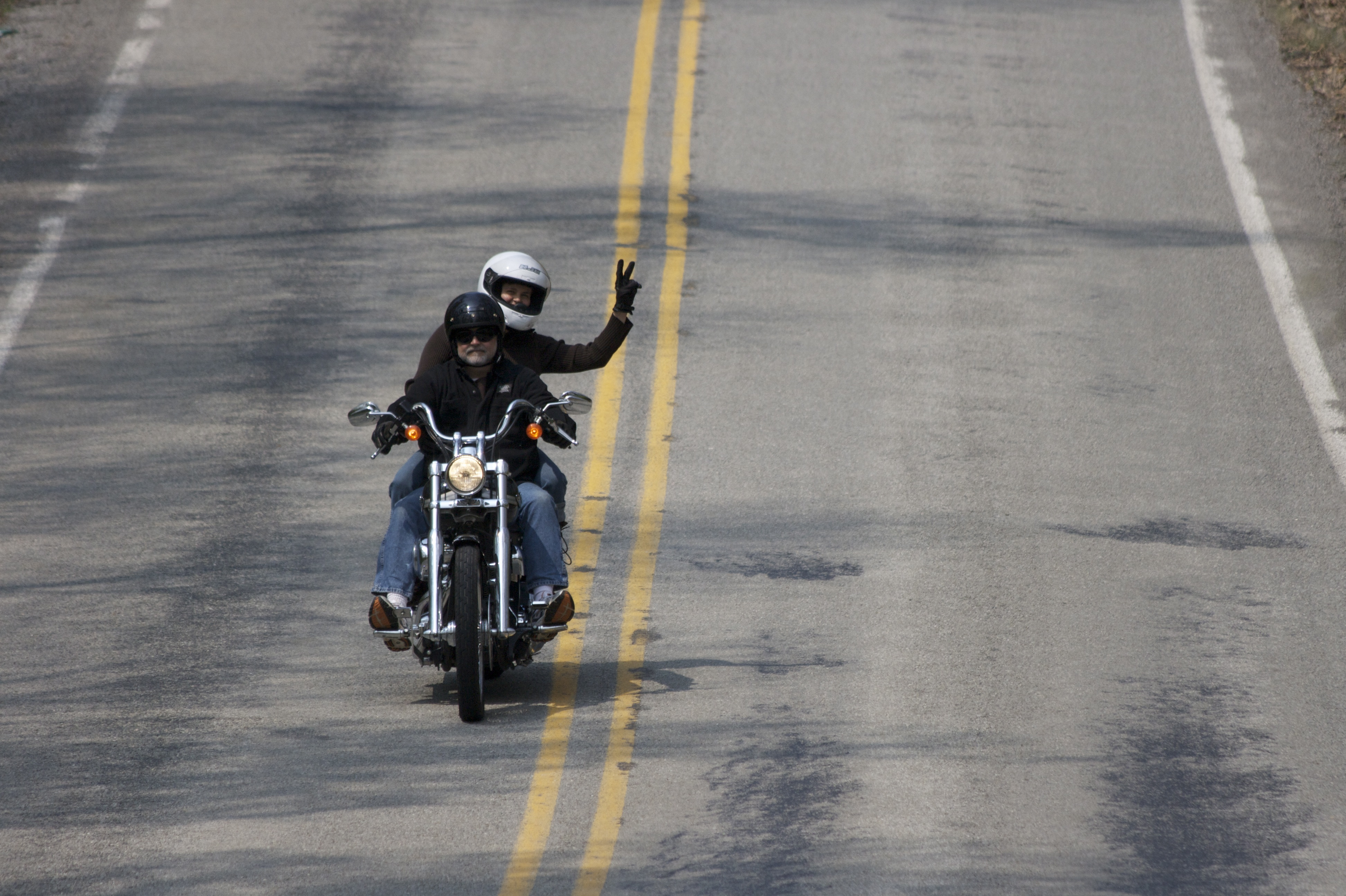
A motorcycle passenger using a V sign
