= Jamshedji Duggan =

Indian ophthalmic surgeon

Sir Jamshedji Nasarwanji Duggan KBE CIE JP (8 April 1884 – 15 January 1957) was an Indian ophthalmic surgeon, magistrate, and Sheriff of Mumbai in 1942.

== Biography ==
Born in Mumbai (then Bombay), Duggan took a licentiate in medicine from the Grant Medical College in 1904, and joined the staff of the Sir Cowasji Jehangir Ophthalmic Hospital in Mumbai in 1906 as clinical registrar and tutor in ophthalmology. From 1908 to 1912, he studied in Vienna, Wiesbaden, and in London under several eminent ophthalmologists, including Hermann Pagenstecher and Edward Treacher Collins, receiving a doctorate in the field from Oxford University in 1912. He then returned to Mumbai, where he established a large practice and became the medical superintendent of the Sir C. Jehangir Ophthalmic Hospital.

During the First World War, Duggan served as an Indian Medical Service (IMS) officer, and was the consultant ophthalmic surgeon to the designated wartime hospitals in Mumbai. He was appointed a justice of the peace in Mumbai in 1916, becoming a magistrate in 1918. Also in 1918, he was elected a Fellow of the College of Physicians and Surgeons of Bombay, being appointed a Fellow of the University of Bombay the same year. He was awarded the honorary rank of major in the Indian Medical Service on 8 November 1919.

In 1923, he was appointed a professor of ophthalmology at the Sir C. J. Ophthalmic Hospital, remaining in this position until his retirement in 1939. During his tenure, he greatly raised the standards of teaching and efficiency at the hospital.

Duggan was promoted to lieutenant-colonel in the Indian Army medical officer reserves on 3 January 1929, and was appointed Officer of the Order of the British Empire (OBE) in the Birthday Honours published in June of that year. In the same year, Duggan introduced higher degrees and diplomas in ophthalmology at both the University of Bombay and the Bombay College of Physicians and Surgeons. He was appointed a Companion of the Order of the Indian Empire (CIE) in the 1933 Birthday Honours, and received a knighthood in the 1935 New Year Honours.

In 1934, Duggan was elected President of the All-India Ophthalmological Society and the President of the Bombay College of Surgeons and Physicians. He was also a frequent contributor to the British Journal of Ophthalmology, serving as its editorial correspondent in Bombay for many years. He retired from the IMS in 1939 with the brevet rank of colonel.

Duggan served as Sheriff of Mumbai in 1942. During the Second World War, he served as Chair of the Bombay Provincial Committee of the Joint War Organisation of the Indian Red Cross Society and St. John Ambulance, in which capacity he was recognised by his promotion to the rank of Knight Commander of the Order of the British Empire (KBE) in the 1945 Birthday Honours. In 1950, he became the Asian representative to the International Council of Ophthalmology. He died on 15 January 1957, aged 72.

== Personal life ==
In 1914, Duggan married Jina (c. 1896–1993); the couple had two sons. Lady Duggan was herself awarded the Kaisar-i-Hind Gold Medal for Public Service in India in the 1934 Birthday Honours.

In her later role as chair of the Indian Red Cross Women's Council for Bombay, she was awarded a rare second Kaisar-i-Hind Gold Medal in the final Indian honours list in 1947.

Lady Duggan survived her husband by 35 years, dying in Mumbai in September 1993. Following her death, her daughter-in-law contested her will, in which Lady Duggan left the Duggan family's palatial 37,000 sq. ft. Mumbai bungalow, "Lawnside," to her grandson Dr. Feroze Duggan; the will was contested on the grounds that Lady Duggan, who had been 96 years old when she made her will, would not have been in a sound state of mind at the time. The case dragged through the courts until August 2011, when the Bombay High Court ruled that a testator's advanced age by itself did not indicate a lack of sound mind, and affirmed the legality of Lady Duggan's will. Although the bungalow was in a state of disrepair by 2011, the property was then worth over INR ₹150 crore (roughly US$30 million), or ₹1.5 billion (US$17 million) today.
