= SS Vega (1913) =

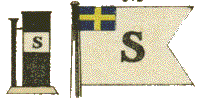
- Stockholms rederi ab Svea

History

Sweden
- Name: Vega
- Owner: Svea
- Operator: Svea
- Port of registry: Stockholm, Sweden 5447
- Route: Baltic and North Sea
- Builder: Lindholmens Verkstads AB
- Cost: SKR 375,000
- Yard number: 411
- Launched: 18 March 1913 in Gothenburg
- Completed: April 1913
- Out of service: 1954
- Captured: 1939 and released
- Fate: Scrapped Travemünde 22 May 1954

Sweden (Red Cross)
- Operator: Red Cross 1939–1945
- Acquired: December 1939
- In service: December 1939 – June 1945

General characteristics
- Type: Steamship
- Tonnage: 1,073 GRT
- Length: 226 ft 4 in (69 m)
- Beam: 25 ft 1 in (7.6 m)
- Draught: 14 ft 4 in (4.4 m)
- Installed power: steam engine
- Propulsion: Two coal-fired boilers, triple-expansion engine; single propeller, 550ihp
- Capacity: 66,550 cu ft
- Crew: Maximum of 21

SS Vega was owned by Stockholms Rederi AB Svea of Stockholm, a company that had owned steamships since 1886.

Launched in Gothenburg she was delivered in April 1913. Coal fired, her bunkers had capacity for 16 days sailing at 10.6 tons a day. Four hatches, each with a steam winch, with a maximum capacity of a 3-ton lift.

== Early years ==
Under the command of her first Captain, John Borg, she ran the route to Düsseldorf which required the ship to have a telescopic smoke stack and folding masts. The Captain changed in September 1914 to Captain G. Flygare. After World War I she sailed the Baltic/North Sea routes.

On 16 September 1939 Vega, en route from Finland to Hull was captured, along with SS Suomen Poika by German submarine U-41 on her first patrol, at position 58N 04E. Taken to Cuxhaven where, found to be carrying goods to an enemy of Germany, her general cargo and timber was confiscated and unloaded. Being a neutral ship she was released on 4 October 1939.

== International Committee of the Red Cross ==
The emblem of the International Committee of the Red Cross (French: Comité international de la croix-rouge)

Vega was chartered by the International Committee of the Red Cross in late 1939 for "relief activities", to be based at Lisbon, Portugal, where it would work with the Cruz Vermelha Portuguesa. During the war period, Vega made 44 voyages for the Red Cross under Captain Wideberg.

Thirty seven voyages from Lisbon to Marseilles between May 1941 to April 1944. Delivering supplies to the Croix-Rouge française in Vichy France in the Zone libre until November 1942, when following Case Anton, the German invasion of Southern France, Red Cross supplies were then delivered into Occupied France. Voyage No 38 was Lisbon to Toulon in November 1944 to a liberated France. Once in France, they were loaded onto railway cars and shipped to Geneva, Switzerland. Here, the International Committee of the Red Cross arranged for their shipment to PoW camps and other detention centers throughout Europe.

Voyages 39 to 44, between December 1944 and June 1945, were made from Lisbon to the Channel Islands where the ship was met by the "Joint War Organisation" (the British Red Cross who had joined with St. John).

=== Voyage 39 ===
Permission was obtained to sail no earlier than 20 December 1944. German artillery observers on Guernsey spotted the ship at 10.40am 27 December 1944. Escorted by a minesweeper, M 4613 and with her radio transmitter disabled, she docked at Saint Peter Port Harbour at 17:50pm watched by a crowd of locals.

The unloading by the Kriegsmarine was watched by a large crowd who lined the route from the harbour to the store where Red Cross Parcels would be stored prior to distribution. The parcels, donated by Canada and New Zealand, being transported on hand pushed rail trolleys to a storage depot in St George's Hall. Unloading was almost completed on 29 December and she sailed for Jersey next day. Unloading by German sailors and marines at Saint Helier harbour was completed on 3 January 1945. Vega then returned to Lisbon.

The Honourable Herbert Morrison MP, speaking as Home Secretary in the British House of Commons on 18 January 1945 stated that "The ship had sustained damage at the harbor at Guernsey," which would require repairs, so delaying the second visit until around 25 January. The damage was to her bottom as she grounded at low tide, having been put in a berth designed for ships of up to 400 tons. She went into dry dock in Lisbon for repairs.

Cargo comprised: 119,792 Red Cross food parcels, 4,200 invalid parcels, 4 tons soap, 5.2 tons salt, 37cwt medical supplies, cigarettes and some children's clothing.

=== Voyage 40 ===
Problems arose with the proposal to transport two members of the International Committee of the Red Cross, as there was only one cabin available and only one space available in a lifeboat, should it be necessary. The extra person was given space in the Captain's cabin and the Captain agreed to breach the safety rules on crew numbers of 21. Sailed 1 February 1945, arrived Guernsey 7 February, departed 11 February, arrived Jersey 13 February, sailed for Lisbon 16 February, arriving on 21 February.

Cargo comprised: 134,656 Red Cross food parcels, 4,200 invalid parcels, 5,465 kilos of tobacco and cigarettes, hearing aids, 20 tons of medical supplies, 200 kg (440 lb) seeds, shoe leather and salt.

=== Voyages 41-44 ===
The first three arrived in the Islands whilst they were still occupied, the last one was after liberation on 9 May 1945. These voyages each brought at least 500 tons of flour, with fewer food parcels.

On voyage 43, the ship was docked alongside the Albert Pier in St Helier, Jersey when the Island was liberated from the occupying forces on 9 May. Presentations and gifts were made by the authorities in Jersey to Captain Wideberg and the crew, thanking them for bringing relief to the Islands.

The work undertaken by Vega for the Red Cross, bringing parcels from Canada and New Zealand, saved many lives.

== After the war ==
After voyage No 44, her work with the International Red Cross was finished and she sailed on 11 June 1945 to London where her Red Cross markings were painted out.

In 1946 modifications were carried out by Middle Docks & Engineering Co Ltd in England to improve crew accommodation, which resulted in a raised bridge and more portholes. The gross tonnage changed to 1156.

By 1954, the ship had reached the end of her working life and sailed across the Baltic to be scrapped at Travemünde, in Germany.

== Commemoration ==
In 1994 two plaques, one in the shape of a Red Cross overlapped with a "V" was unveiled at the berth where Vega had berthed in St Helier harbour, with a second small granite plaque at the Jersey Maritime Museum.

A set of stamps was issued by Guernsey in December 2004 to commemorate memories of World War II. These included a picture of Vega. In 2013, to mark the 150th anniversary of the International Red Cross and Red Crescent Movement, Jersey issued a set of postage stamps featuring Vega.

Floats depicting Vega regularly appear at the Guernsey and Jersey Battle of Flowers, as well as Liberation Day celebrations with TV programs regularly mentioning the Red Cross work of Vega.
