= 1884 in Belgium =

- Decades: 1860s; 1870s; 1880s; 1890s; 1900s
- See also: Other events of 1884; List of years in Belgium

The following lists events that happened during 1884 in the Kingdom of Belgium.

== Incumbents ==
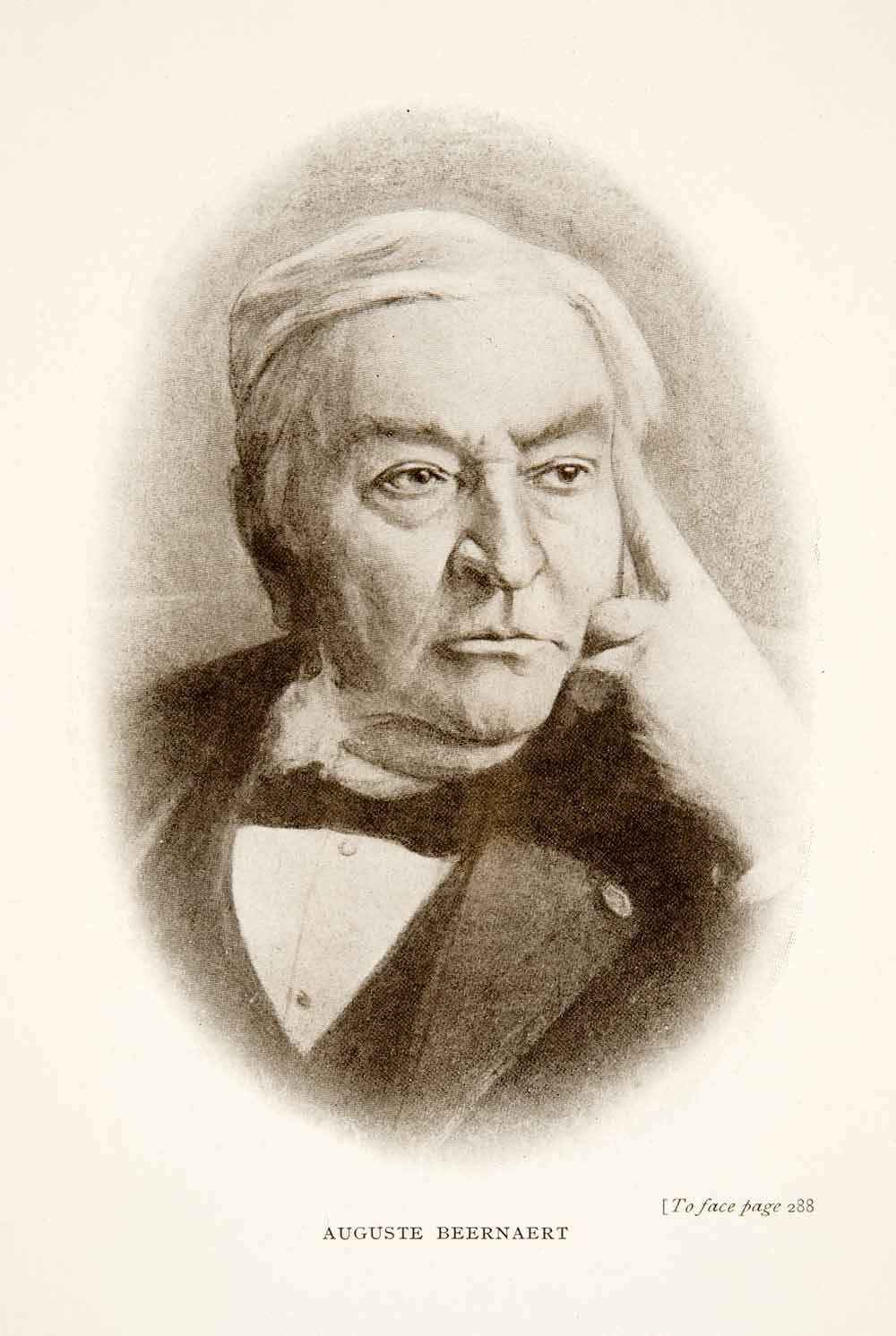
Auguste Beernaert (1829–1912), Prime Minister 1884–1894

- Monarch: Leopold II
- Prime Minister:
  - until 16 June: Walthère Frère-Orban
  - 16 June–26 October: Jules Malou
  - starting 26 October: Auguste Marie François Beernaert

== Events ==
- Belgian State Railways Type 25 taken into service
- 15 May – North Sea Fisheries Convention (signed 1882) comes into effect
- 16 June – Jules Malou replaces Walthère Frère-Orban as Prime Minister
- 25 May – Provincial elections
- June and July – Belgian general election, 1884
- 5 July – Paris Convention for the Protection of Industrial Property obtains legal force
- 26 October – Auguste Beernaert replaces Jules Malou as Prime Minister
- End of the First School War between confessional Catholic Party and secularist Liberal Party

== Publications ==
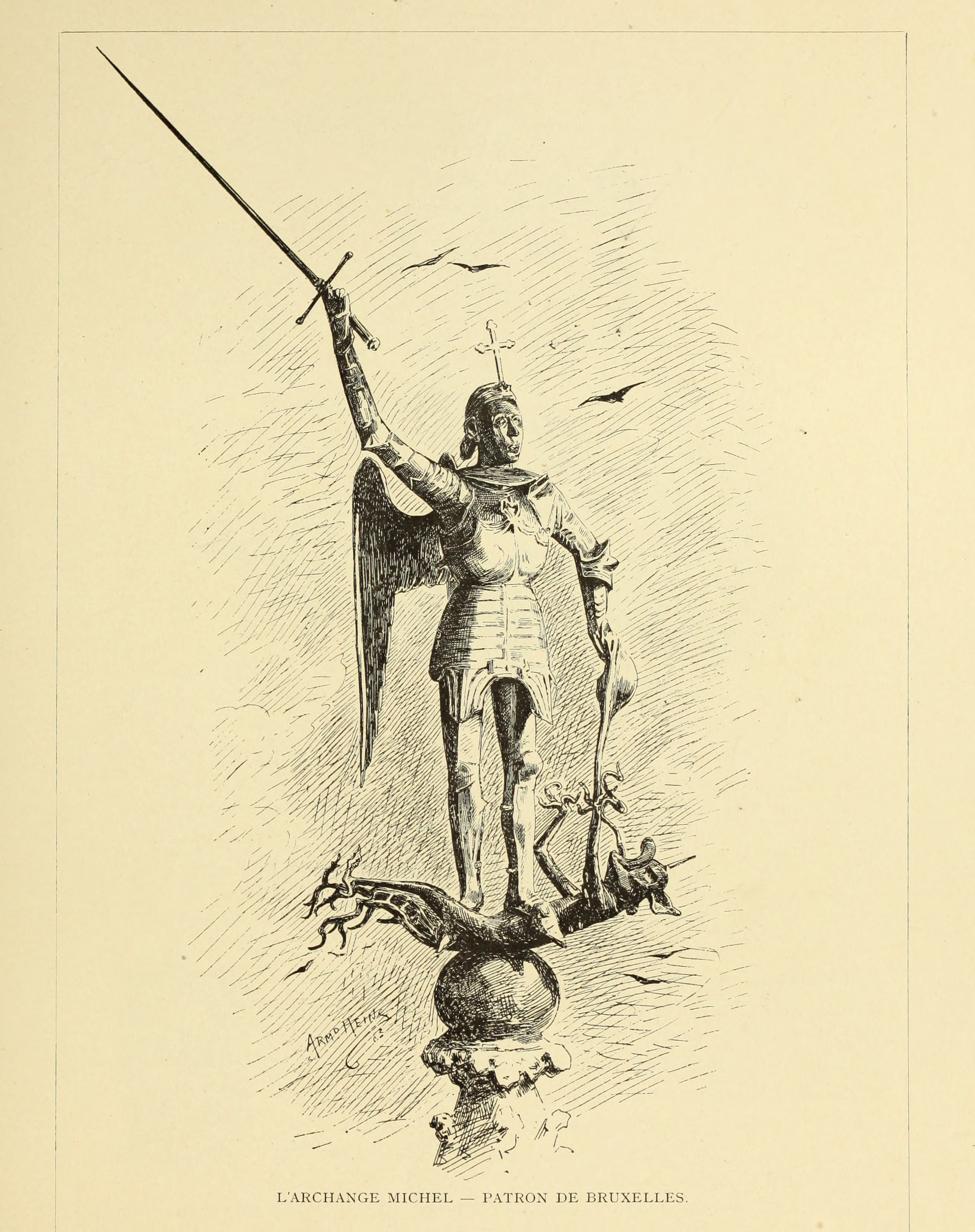
Frontispiece from Bruxelles à travers les âges (3 vols., 1884)

Periodicals

- Annales de la Société entomologique de Belgique, vol. 28.
- La Belgique Horticole, vol. 34, edited by Édouard Morren.
- Bibliographie de la Belgique, vol. 10.
- Bulletins de l'Académie royale des sciences, des lettres et des beaux-arts de Belgique (Brussels, M. Hayez).
- La Jeune Belgique, vol. 3.
- Jurisprudence du port d'Anvers, vol. 29.
- Le Magasin littéraire et scientifique begins publication.
- Mémoires de l'Académie royale des sciences, des lettres et des beaux-arts de Belgique, vol. 45.
- Messager des sciences historiques.
- Le Mouvement Géographique begins publication.
- Le Patriote begins publication.

Books

- Maria Doolaeghe, Jongste dichtbundel
- Louis Hymans, Bruxelles à travers les âges (3 vols., Brussels, Bruylant-Christophe)
- Isidoor Teirlinck and Reimond Stijns, Arm Vlaanderen
- Léon Vanderkindere, L'Université de Bruxelles: Notice historique, faite à la demande du Conseil d'Administration (Brussels, P. Weissenbruch)

== Art and architecture ==
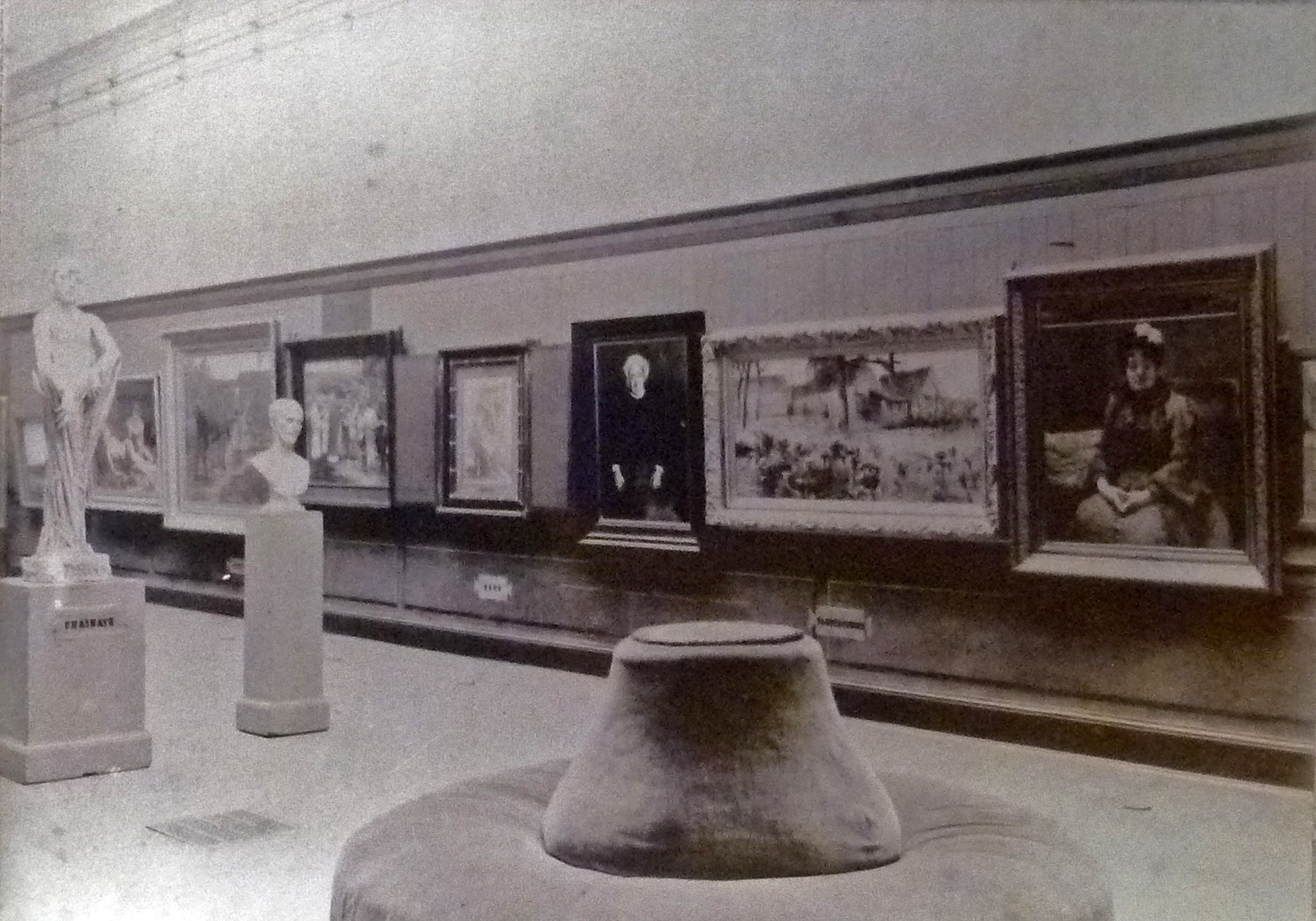
Photograph of the first exhibition of Les XX (1884)

Exhibitions

- February – First exhibition of Les XX opens

Paintings

- Théo van Rysselberghe, Four Breakwaters
- James Ensor, The Rooftops of Ostend

== Births ==
- 19 January – Valerius Geerebaert, Redemptorist (died 1957)
- 17 February – Arthur Vanderpoorten, politician (died 1945)
- 21 March – Paul Demasy, playwright (died 1974)
- 26 May – Félix Goblet d'Alviella, newspaperman (died 1957)
- 3 June – Julius Raes, Capuchin archivist (died 1961)
- 8 June – Paul Ermens, colonial officer (died 1957)
- 13 June – Jean Brusselmans, painter (died 1953)
- 6 September – Julien Lahaut, communist (died 1950)
- 22 November – Oscar Sevrin, missionary (died 1975)
- 30 November – Yvan Goor, motorcyclist (died 1958)
- 10 December
  - Marguerite Devigne, art historian (died 1967)
  - Robert Gillon, politician (died 1972)
- 20 December – Jean-Baptiste Sipido, anarchist (died 1959)

== Deaths ==
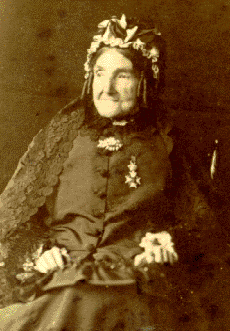
Maria Doolaeghe (1803–1884), Flemish writer

- 7 April – Maria Doolaeghe (born 1803), poet
- 22 May – Louis Hymans (born 1829), writer and politician
- 29 May – Auguste Chauvin (born 1810), artist and educator
- 10 July – Henri Delmotte (born 1822), writer
- 23 July – Louis Galesloot (born 1821), archivist
- 5 November – Edouard d'Huart (born 1800), politician
- 1 December – Louis-Gustave Amelot (born 1857), engineer
- 4 December – Frédéric Faber (born 1837), bibliophile
- 28 December – Edmond Hanssens (born 1843), colonial administrator
