= 1955 in Belgium =

- Decades: 1930s; 1940s; 1950s; 1960s; 1970s
- See also: Other events of 1955; List of years in Belgium

Events in the year 1955 in Belgium.

== Incumbents ==
- Monarch – Baudouin
- Prime Minister – Achille Van Acker

== Events ==
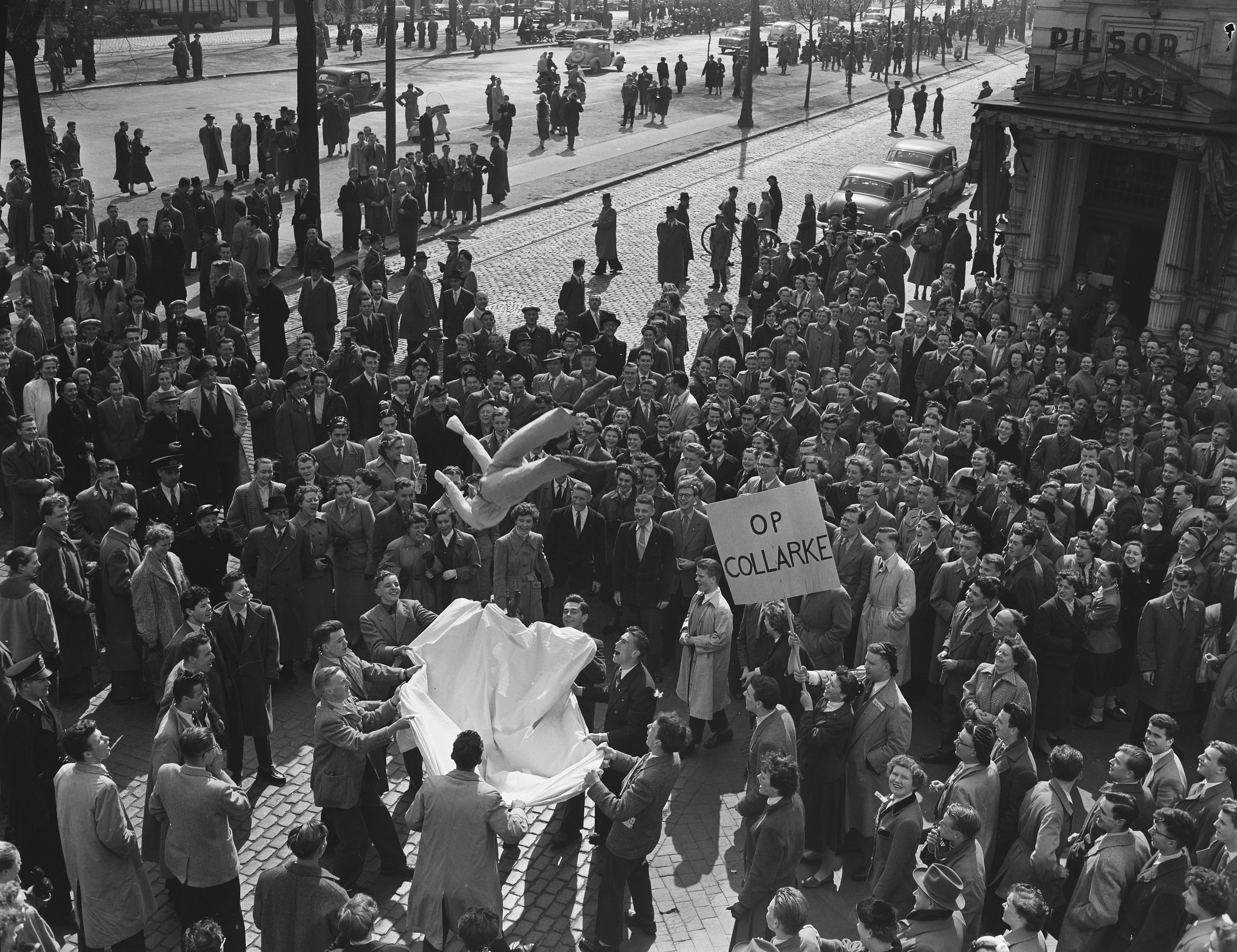
A demonstration in Antwerp against the School Law

- 9 February – Joint letter from the Belgian bishops calling on the government to revise its education policy.
- 26 March – Mass demonstration in Brussels against Socialist–Liberal education bill.
- 3 April – International friendly between the Dutch and Belgian national football teams in the Olympic Stadium, Amsterdam.
- 16 April – Belgian Chamber of Translators and Interpreters is founded.
- 6 May – Paris Protocol transforming the Brussels Pact into the Western European Union comes into effect.
- 16 May – King Baudouin arrives in Belgian Congo for a royal tour of the colony.
- 13 June – Education bill passes in lower house.
- 10 July – Over a quarter of a million demonstrate in Brussels against Socialist–Liberal education policy.
- 21 July – Education bill passes in senate.
- 5 November – Convention establishing the Interparliamentary Consultative Council of the Benelux.

== Publications ==
Comics

- Edgar P. Jacobs, Le Mystère de la Grande Pyramide, Tome 2 (the fifth comic book in the Blake and Mortimer series)

== Art and architecture ==
Paintings

- René Magritte, The Mysteries of the Horizon

Films

- André Cauvin (dir.), Bwana Kitoko
- Ytzen Brusse (dir.), Introducing Belgium [The Atlantic Community Series].

== Births ==
- 16 January – Martin De Prycker, engineer
- 16 March – Linda Lepomme, singer
- 26 April – Frieda Van Themsche, politician
- 24 May – Philippe Lafontaine, singer
- 8 June – Philippe Vlerick, businessman
- 3 July – Maria Herrijgers, cyclist
- 5 July – Beatrijs Deconinck, judge
- 6 July – Johan Vande Lanotte, politician
- 9 July – Alexandra Colen, politician
- 24 July – Joseph Reynaerts, singer (died 2020)
- 5 August – Daniel Ost, gardener
- 18 August – André Flahaut, politician
- 27 August – Kristien Hemmerechts, writer
- 29 August – Frank Hoste, cyclist
- 10 September – Jean-Pierre Vande Velde, footballer
- 2 October – Michel Wintacq, footballer
- 13 October – Patrick Dewael, politician
- 18 October – Jean-Pierre Hautier, television presenter (died 2012)
- 21 October – Frank Vandenbroucke, politician
- 3 November – Michel Renquin, footballer
- 27 November – Alain De Roo, cyclist
- 4 December – Jean-Philippe Vandenbrande, cyclist
- 6 December – Piet Vanthemsche, veterinary surgeon
- 18 December – André Geerts, comics creator (died 2010)

== Deaths ==
- 2 January – Leo Goemans (born 1869), dialectologist
- 24 January – Charles Deruyter (born 1890), cyclist
- 13 February – Raoul Henkart (born 1907), fencer
- 19 February – Marcel Dubois (born 1886), wrestler
- 21 February – Emmanuel Janssen (born 1879), industrialist
- 8 March – Princess Clémentine of Belgium (born 1872)
- 21 March – Octave Dierckx (born 1882), politician
- 16 April – Robert, 7th Duke d'Ursel (born 1873), politician
- 7 June – Alfred Bastien (born 1873), war artist
- 5 July – Gustave Magnel (born 1889), engineer
- 3 August – Fernand Faniard (born 1894), opera singer
- 9 August – Henri Verhavert (born 1874), gymnast
- 3 September – Léon Halkin (born 1872), historian
- 16 October – Charles Cambier (born 1884), footballer
- 19 October – Eugène Joseph Delporte (born 1882), astronomer
- 13 November – Jacques Feyerick (born 1874), athlete
- 22 December – Jules-Émile Verschaffelt (born 1870), physicist
