= 1962 in Belgium =

- Decades: 1940s; 1950s; 1960s; 1970s; 1980s
- See also: Other events of 1962; List of years in Belgium

Events in the year 1962 in Belgium.

== Incumbents ==
- Monarch: Baudouin
- Prime Minister: Théo Lefèvre

== Events ==
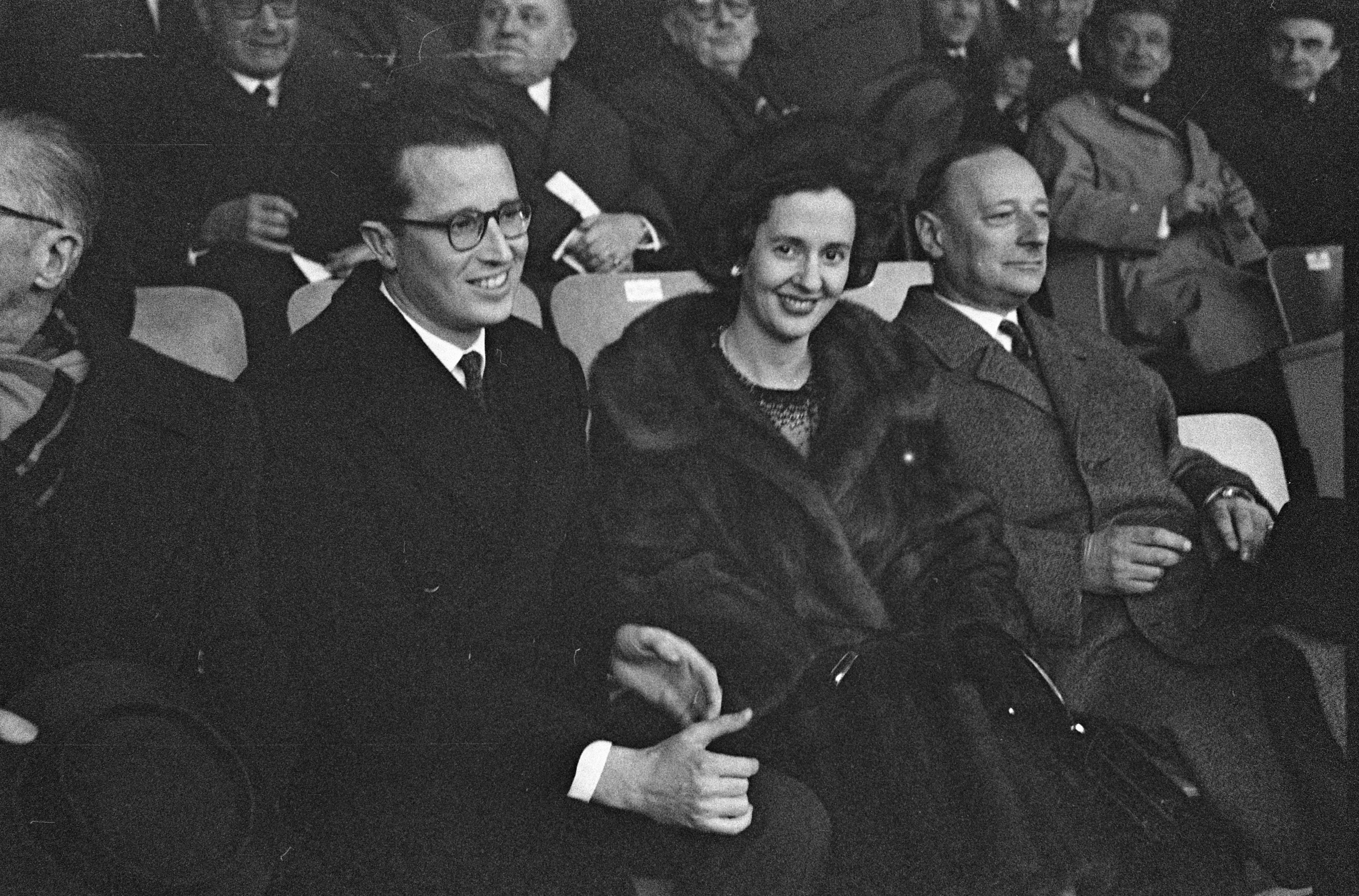
King Baudouin and Queen Fabiola watch Standard Liège playing Real Madrid

- 12 April – Standard Liège play Real Madrid
- 30 April – Law on conscription to the armed forces institutes obligation of 8 months' service for all able-bodied men.
- 1 July – Ruanda-Urundi becomes independent Republic of Rwanda and Kingdom of Burundi
- 14 October – Rioting in Brussels between Flemish nationalist and Francophone demonstrators.

== Art and architecture ==
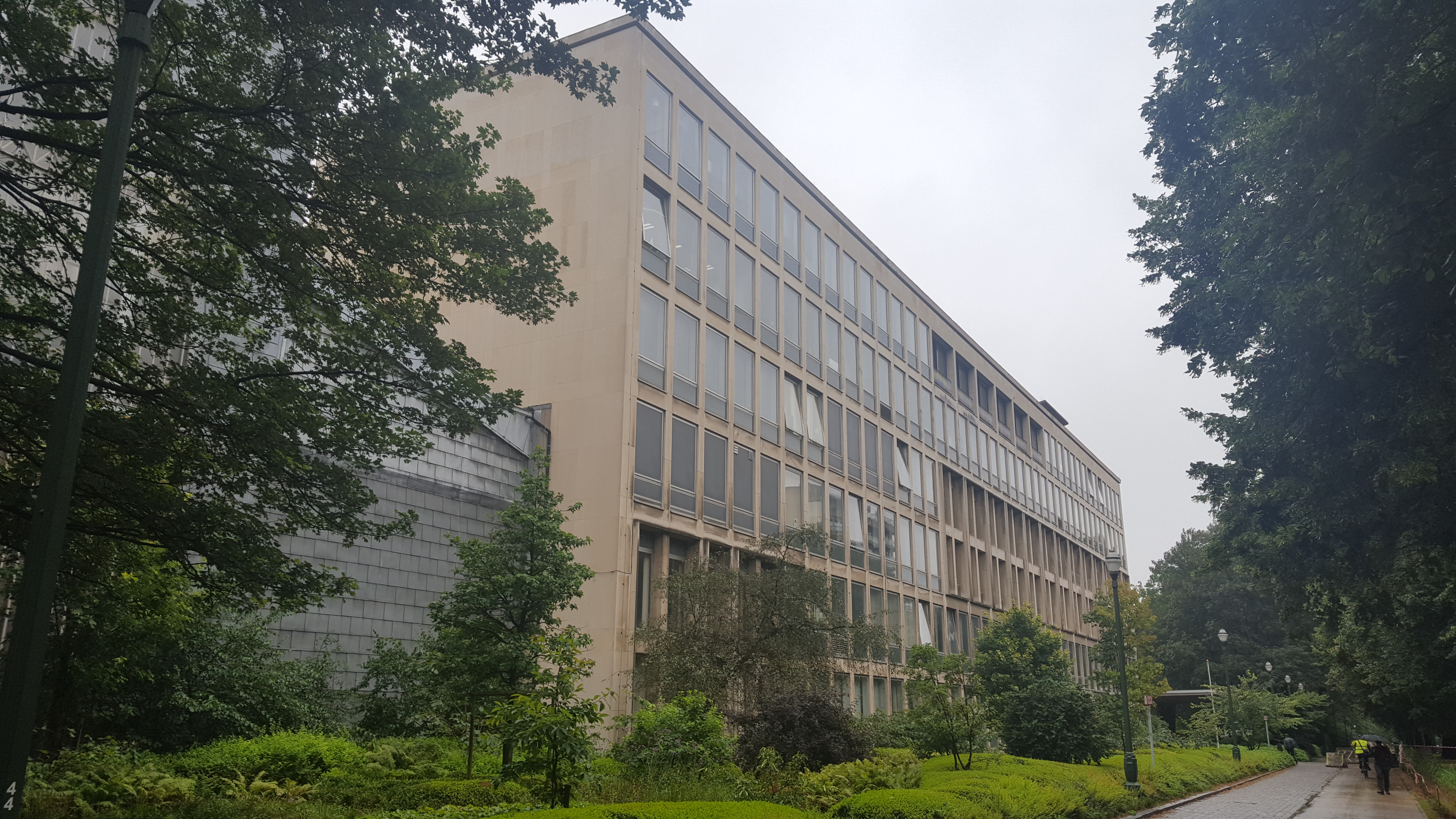
Royal Institute for Cultural Heritage building (1962)

- Royal Institute for Cultural Heritage moves to its new building.

== Births ==
- 8 February – Goedele Vermeiren, politician
- 16 February – Patrick Davin, conductor (died 2020)
- 10 February – Els De Temmerman, journalist
- 17 March – Wim Henderickx, composer (died 2022)
- 1 April – Renaud Hardy, serial killer (died 2026)
- 4 April – Willy Borsus, politician
- 28 April – Maggie De Block, politician
- 29 April – Christine Defraigne, politician
- 10 May – Gerda Dendooven, illustrator
- 12 July – Dixie Dansercoer, explorer (died 2021)
- 22 July – Pieter De Crem, politician
- 11 August – Anna Callebaut, cyclist
- 29 September - Rita Bellens, politician
- 1 November – Hendrik Redant, cyclist
- 20 November – Thierry Hancisse, actor
- 7 December – Piet Huysentruyt, TV chef
- 14 December – Kathleen Vereecken, writer

== Deaths ==
- 12 January – Richard de Guide (born 1909), composer
- 26 February – Maurice Emile Marie Goetghebuer (born 1876), entomologist
- 27 February – Albéric Collin (born 1886), sculptor
- 2 March – Charles Jean de la Vallée Poussin (born 1866), mathematician
- 1 April – Michel de Ghelderode (born 1898), dramatist
- 17 July – Hendrik De Vocht (born 1878), scholar
- 20 July – André Renard (born 1911), trade unionist
- 7 August – Filip De Pillecyn (born 1891), writer
- 13 August – Jean Cuvelier (born 1882), missionary bishop
- 30 September – Anne de Borman (born 1881), tennis player
- 28 October – Pierre Froidebise (born 1914), organist
- 21 December – Fernand Rigaux (born 1905), astronomer
