= 1957 in Belgium =

- Decades: 1930s; 1940s; 1950s; 1960s; 1970s
- See also: Other events of 1957; List of years in Belgium

Events from the year 1957 in Belgium

== Incumbents ==
- Monarch: Baudouin
- Prime Minister: Achille Van Acker

== Events ==
- 25 March – Belgium became a signatory to the Treaty of Rome establishing the European Economic Community.

== Publications ==
- M. A. Buisseret, The Policy of Belgium in Her Overseas Territories (Brussels, Information and Public Relations Office for the Belgian Congo and Ruanda Urundi)

Periodicals

- Cultural periodical Ons Erfdeel launched

== Births ==
- 22 April – Luc De Schepper, physicist (died 2022)

== Deaths ==
- 18 August – Huib Hoste (born 1881), architect
- 26 December – Valerius Geerebaert (born 1884), Redemptorist
