= Feerick =

Feerick is a surname. Notable people with the surname include:

- Bob Feerick (1920–1976), American basketball player
- John Feerick (born 1936), American legal academic
- Mike Feerick (fl. 1995), Irish businessman

== See also ==
- Ferrick
- Feyerick
