= RIP.ie =

Death notices website in Ireland

- Website type: Death notices website
- Owner: The Irish Times Group
- Creators: Jay Coleman; Dympna Coleman
- Website: rip.ie
- Launched: 2005; 21 years ago

RIP.ie is a death notices website in Ireland, launched in 2005. As of 2021, the website received approximately 250,000 visits per day and more than 50 million pages were viewed each month. Accounts for 2019 showed net assets of over €1 million. Since 2024 it has been owned by The Irish Times Group.

Death notices may only be submitted by funeral directors and not directly by members of the public. Members of the public may submit messages of condolence on individual death notices, which are reviewed by the business prior to publication, and which are organised into a downloadable book of condolence. The website contains a service directory, which lists funeral directors, florists and caterers, and an online shop selling handwritten sympathy cards.

== History ==
Jay and Dympna Coleman, based in Dundalk, County Louth, founded the RIP.ie website in 2005.

Restrictions on funeral attendances due to the COVID-19 pandemic saw a large increase in online condolences.

The Central Statistics Office (CSO) used RIP.ie in an attempt to calculate excess mortality from March to September 2020, in a study it published in November 2020.

Entrepreneur Mike Feerick, has made a claim to 20% of the shares in the company. Feerick had a business relationship with the Colemans from 2007 to 2010, which was terminated by the Colemans. Legal correspondence over the claim ended in 2011 but resurfaced in 2021 when RIP.ie was reported to be on the market for up to €5 million. The matter was before the Irish High Court.

On 2 May 2024, The Irish Times Group announced that it had acquired the website. RIP.ie was receiving 60 million page views per month when it was sold. In December 2024 RIP.ie stated it would start charging €100 for death notices.
