= 1963 in Belgium =

- Decades: 1940s; 1950s; 1960s; 1970s; 1980s
- See also: Other events of 1963; List of years in Belgium

Events in the year 1963 in Belgium.

== Incumbents ==
- Monarch: Baudouin
- Prime Minister: Théo Lefèvre

== Events ==
- 2 August – Division of Belgium into four linguistically defined territories comes into force.

== Publications ==
- Hergé, Les Bijoux de la Castafiore album (serialised July 1961 to September 1962)

== Births ==
- 9 March – Yves Vander Cruysen, historian and local politician (died 2020)
- 13 June – Dominique Mathieu, cardinal
- 16 December – Nadia Moscufo, politician

== Deaths ==
- 30 May – Marthe Crick-Kuntziger (born 1891), museum curator
