= Alessio Pavone =

Belgian weightlifter (born 2002)

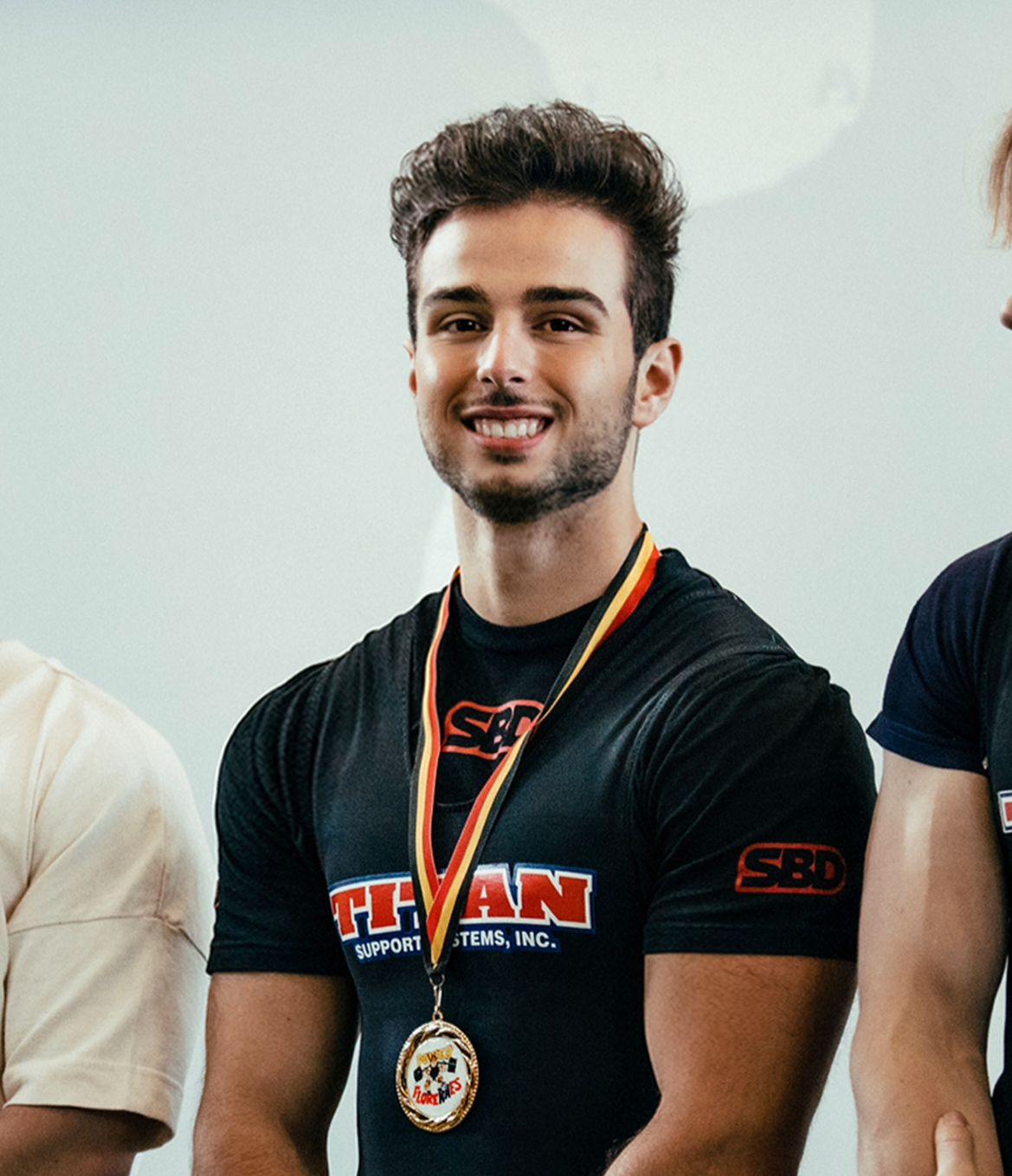
- Born: February 6, 2002 (age 23); Genk, Limburg, Belgium
- Occupation: Student
- Years active: Sep 2020 to present
- Known for: Powerlifting
- Height: 1.70 m (5 ft 7 in)

Alessio Pavone is a Belgian junior powerlifting champion. He was born in Genk, Limburg, Belgium in 2002, the son of Italian parents, and is currently studying a BA (TEW) in Applied Economics at Hasselt University. He is a Christian believer and fluent in many languages of which Italian and Dutch are native. Pavone currently holds the Belgian national record in his class for a squat lift.

== Career ==
Pavone began competitive powerlifting in September 2020 with the Powermove Club in Leuven, where he entered and won the Men's Classic -66 Sub-Juniors at the 2020 VGPF Corona Herstart a month later, setting new regional records in that class. In August 2021 he won silver in the Men's Classic -66 Juniors at the 2021 VGPF Vlaams Kampioenschap (Flemish Championships) in Leuven. In October 2021 he won gold in the Men's Classic -66 Juniors at the 2021 VGPF Belgisch Kampioenschap - Championnats de Belgique (All Belgium Championship) in Florennes at the same event setting a new national record with a squat lift of 181 kg. In 2022 during the Belgisch Club Kampioenschap he raised this to 194kg, also breaking the open class national record. During the Belgisch kampioenschap he also renewed his national champion title for 2022.

== Personal bests ==
- Squat - 194 kg
- Bench press - 130 kg
- Deadlift - 227.5 kg
- Total - 552.5 kg
- GL points - 86.13
