= 1954 in Belgium =

- Decades: 1930s; 1940s; 1950s; 1960s; 1970s
- See also: Other events of 1954; List of years in Belgium

Events in the year 1954 in Belgium.

== Incumbents ==
- Monarch – Baudouin
- Prime Minister – Jean Van Houtte (to 23 April); Achille Van Acker (from 23 April)

== Events ==
April

- 11 April – general election reduces Christian Social Party majority
- 23 April – Socialist-Liberal coalition under Achille Van Acker takes office

August

- 29-30 August – Minister of Education Léo Collard sacks 110 school teachers with teaching qualifications from Catholic institutions

September

- 13-18 September – Tenth Solvay Conference on Physics held in Brussels, chaired by Lawrence Bragg

October

- 23 October – Paris Protocol agreed, transforming the Brussels Pact into the Western European Union (with Germany and Italy joining).

== Publications ==
- Hergé, Explorers on the Moon, Tintin album (serialised 1952–1953)
- Georges Simenon, Maigret à l'école and Maigret et la Jeune Morte

== Art and architecture ==
- René Magritte, L'Empire des lumières

== Births ==
- 18 January – Jeanine De Landtsheer, classicist (died 2021)
- 8 March – Daniel Ducarme, politician (died 2010)
- 10 March – Luc Dardenne, film-maker
- 12 April – Steve Stevaert politician (died 2015)
- 7 May – Philippe Geluck, comedian and cartoonist
- 13 May – René Stockman, psychiatrist and religious superior

== Deaths ==
- 17 March – Victor Rousseau (born 1865), sculptor
- 18 April – Denis Verschueren (born 1897), cyclist
- 18 June – André Benoit (born 1900), cyclist
- 5 October – Flor Alpaerts (born 1876), composer
