= Feyerick =

Feyerick is a surname. Notable people with the surname include:

- Deborah Feyerick, American journalist and CNN correspondent
- Ferdinand Feyerick (1865–1920), Belgian Olympic fencer
- Jacques Feyerick (1874–1955), Belgian athlete
- Robert Feyerick (1892–1940), Belgian Olympic fencer, son of Ferdinand

== See also ==
- Feerick
