= 1956 in Belgium =

- Decades: 1930s; 1940s; 1950s; 1960s; 1970s
- See also: Other events of 1956; List of years in Belgium

Events from the year 1956 in Belgium

== Incumbents ==
- Monarch: Baudouin
- Prime Minister: Achille Van Acker

== Events ==
- 7 June – Labour Treaty signed at The Hague establishing free movement of labour between Belgium, Luxembourg and the Netherlands, to come into force 1 November 1960.
- 8 August – Mining accident of Marcinelle claims 262 lives, including 136 Italian foreign workers

== Publications ==
- L. Petilllon, Belgium's Policy in the Belgian Congo (New York, Belgian Government Information Center)
- Le Mont des Oliviers (The Mountain of Olive Trees), novel by Marie-Thérèse Bodart

== Births ==
- 19 June – Mireille Versele, cystic fibrosis campaigner (died 1982)
- 23 September – Serge Noël, poet (died 2020)
