= Alison (company) =

Irish online education platform

- Website type: e-learning, online education
- Available in: English, Spanish, French, Portuguese, Russian, Arabic, Chinese, Hindi, Urdu
- Headquarters: Galway, Ireland
- Owner: Capernaum Ltd.
- Creators: Mike Feerick (founder and CEO)
- Website: www.alison.com
- Commercial: Yes
- Registration: Required
- Users: 25 million (2022)
- Launched: 21 April 2007; 19 years ago
- Current status: Active

ALISON is an Irish online education platform for higher education that provides certificate courses and accredited diploma courses. It was founded on 21 April 2007 in Galway, Ireland, by Irish social entrepreneur Mike Feerick.

As of July 2022, Alison has 4,000 courses, 25 million learners worldwide, and 4.5 million graduates.

== History ==
Mike Feerick developed the platform in 2006. On 21 April 2007, Alison was launched with six courses. On 5 July 2016, President Pranab Mukherjee of India announced the partnership between Alison and the National Skill Development Corporation.

In 2015, Alison in partnership with the US Correctional Education Association launched an online course for skills to get back into work, aimed at people in prison to address recidivism through free online education.

In April 2017, the company launched its mobile application. In March 2021, Alison announced the acquisition of Dash Beyond, an India-based edutech company that specializes in career development and skills training. In May 2021, Alison announced an agreement with Co-operation Ireland for the West of Ireland. The three-year sponsorship helped in the development of a Support Chapter for the North/South peace charity in the West of Ireland, and the development of an All-Ireland Online Schools Programme.

In 2025, former Fine Gael Minister of State Ciarán Cannon joined Alison as Vice President of Global Affairs.

== Products and services ==
=== Business model ===
The platform allows registered users to access digitally-based education and skills training for free. Alison's income is generated through advertising and the sale of certificates. According to The Economist, the company seeks to drive education through advertising in the manner of television and radio. The platform uses an online pay per click advertising revenue model.

=== Courses ===
As of 2022, Alison has courses and learning verticals across nine core subject categories, at certificate and diploma levels. There is no time limit for completing a course. In 2020, Alison published a course on the coronavirus in 50 languages. In partnership with mEducation Alliance, Alison has developed 2 courses on digital literacy in 2022. In partnership with EcoEd4All, the company also offers environmental education courses.

Courses are accredited by CPD UK, the continuing professional development institution in the United Kingdom. The company also conducts Wellbeing Survey, in partnership with the healthcare provider Welliba.

== Awards ==
Alison was among the four winners of the 2010 UNESCO King Hamad bin Isa Al Khalifa Prize, a Prize for innovation in ICT for Education. In October 2013, Alison won an award at the World Innovation Summit for Education held in Qatar.

In February 2021, Alison was awarded the Civil Solidarity Prize by the European Economic and Social Committee (EESC) for its free course "Coronavirus – What you need to know", which was published in February 2020 to inform people about the spread of the virus, its effects and how to protect themselves.

== See also ==
- Language education
- List of Language Self-Study Programs
- Massive open online course
