= 1961 in Belgium =

- Decades: 1940s; 1950s; 1960s; 1970s; 1980s
- See also: Other events of 1961; List of years in Belgium

Events in the year 1961 in Belgium.

== Incumbents ==
- Monarch: Baudouin
- Prime Minister: Gaston Eyskens (until 25 April), Théo Lefèvre (starting 25 April)

== Events ==
- 15 February – Sabena Flight 548
- 26 March – Belgian general election, 1961

== Births ==
- 14 March – Christ'l Smet, windsurfer
- 23 April – Patrick De Koning, archer
- 25 April – Frank De Winne, astronaut
- 28 April – Michel Hofman, admiral
- 13 May – Marc De Mesmaeker, police officer
- 22 May – Elke Tindemans, politician
- 29 June – Wim Claes, composer (died 2018)
- 12 July – Diederik Foubert, cyclist
- 16 July – Willem Wijnant, cyclist
- 28 July – Gerda Sierens, cyclist
- 6 August – Rudy Patry, cyclist
- 14 August – Peter Joos, Olympic fencer
- 11 September – Sophie de Schaepdrijver, historian
- 14 September – Karl Meersman, cartoonist
- 18 September – Danny Lippens, cyclist
- 10 November – Bruno Tuybens, politician
- 22 November – Myriam Vanlerberghe, politician
- 30 December – Bernard Clerfayt, politician

== Deaths ==
- 17 May – Frans Van Cauwelaert, politician (born 1880)
- 6 June – Julius Raes, Capucin archivist (born 1884)
- 4 August – Victor van Strydonck de Burkel, general (born 1876)
- 17 December – John Van Alphen, footballer (born 1914)
