= 1958 in Belgium =

- Decades: 1930s; 1940s; 1950s; 1960s; 1970s
- See also: Other events of 1958; List of years in Belgium

Events in the year 1958 in Belgium.

== Incumbents ==
- Monarch – Baudouin
- Prime Minister – Achille Van Acker (to 26 June); Gaston Eyskens (from 26 June)

== Events ==
=== January ===
- 1 January – Treaty of Rome establishing European Economic Community comes into force.
- 10 January – Konrad Adenauer and Robert Schuman received honorary doctorates from the Catholic University of Leuven.

=== February ===
- 3 February – Treaty creating Benelux Economic Union signed, to come into force 1 November 1960, providing for free movement of workers, capital, services, and goods between Belgium, the Netherlands, and Luxembourg.
- 15 February – Ravenstein Gallery in Brussels opens

=== March ===
- 11 March – Prince Albert takes his seat in the Senate.
- 12 March – Fud Leclerc comes sixth in the Eurovision Song Contest, singing "Ma petite chatte".
- 18 March – Atomium completed.

=== April ===
- 4 April – Tourist information office opens on the Place de Brouckère, Brussels.
- 12 April – Bokrijk open-air museum opens.
- 17 April – King Baudouin opens Expo 58, the first major World's Fair since the Second World War. John Carl Studder of El Paso, Texas, had queued for 48 hours to be the first visitor admitted.

=== May ===
- 18 May
  - Demonstration of about 200,000 marches through Brussels to protest the Socialist government's education policy.
  - A Douglas DC-7 on a Sabena flight to Léopoldville crashes in Casablanca, with 65 fatalities and 4 survivors.
- 28 May – Real Madrid wins the European Cup Final against A.C. Milan in the Heysel Stadium, Brussels

=== June ===
- 1 June – General election held: Christian Democrats become the largest group in parliament.
- 15 June
  - Tony Brooks wins the 19th Belgian Grand Prix at Spa-Francorchamps.
  - Brussels Film Festival opens, with Georges Simenon chairing the jury.
- 22 June – Olivier Gendebien, partnered with Phil Hill in the Scuderia Ferrari team, comes first in the 24 Hours of Le Mans.
- 26 June
  - 45th Tour de France starts in Brussels.
  - Gaston Eyskens (Christian Social Party) replaces Achille Van Acker (Socialist Party) as Prime Minister.

=== July ===
- 20–23 July – World Archery Championships held in Brussels.

=== September ===
- 9 September – USS Skate (SSN-578) ceremonially welcomed in Zeebrugge after its Arctic mission.
- 25 September – Belgian government intervenes to reduce the price of Belgian coal, with 7,855,000 tonnes stockpiled but uncompetitively expensive on international markets.

=== October ===
- 4 October – Sabena breaks Brussels–Paris air speed record with an S58 helicopter.
- 10 October – Patrice Lumumba founds Mouvement National Congolais.
- 12 October – Municipal elections; Christian Social Party makes gains.
- 19 October – Expo 58 closes.

=== November ===
- 6 November – Political agreement reached on post-war reforms to educational policy, ending a period of contention known as the "Second School War".
- 28 November – Patrice Lumumba declares in Léopoldville that "Independence is not a gift of Belgium but a fundamental right of the Congolese people."

=== December ===
- 1 December – Francis Walder awarded the Prix Goncourt for his Saint-Germain ou la négociation.
- 11 December – Dominique Pire receives the Nobel Peace Prize.

=== Full date unknown ===
- En 50 ans, documentary film is released.

== Publications ==
- Léon Kochnitzky, Negro Art in the Belgian Congo (New York, Belgian Government Information Center)

== Performances ==
May

- 2 May – Annie Fischer performs at Expo58.

June

- 22 June – Galina Ulanova performs at Expo58.
- 24 June – Amália Rodrigues performs at Expo58.

August

- 20 August – First performance of Gian Carlo Menotti's Maria Golovin at Expo58.

== Film ==
- Nature documentary Les Seigneurs de la forêt – English version with narration by Orson Welles distributed internationally by 20th Century Fox as Lords of the Forest (UK) or Masters of the Congo Jungle (US)

== Births ==
- 16 July – Sabine de Bethune, politician
- 14 December – Jan Fabre, artist

== Deaths ==
- 6 January – Princess Joséphine Caroline of Belgium
- 11 April – Alfred De Taeye (born 1905), politician
