= Francesco Mander =

Italian composer

Francesco Mander (26 October 1915, Rome – 2 September 2004, Latisana) was an Italian conductor and composer.

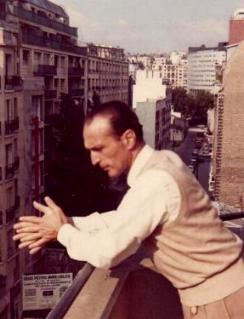
Francesco Mander, Paris 1967. In the background the French radio and TV headquarters

== Biography ==
Francesco Mander was the only son of Pietro Mander, a film producer and owner of Mander Film, and Lucia Mercadante. From his father he inherited his love for literature; from his mother he gained a passion for music. His mother was a descendant of noted Italian opera composer Saverio Mercadante (1795-1870). From an early age his parents took him to concerts in Rome's famed concert hall, the Augusteo.

After the family moved to Milan, Mander continued his piano study and also took up the cello. His teacher was Enzo Martinenghi, the solo cellist of the Teatro alla Scala orchestra, then under the baton of Arturo Toscanini.

Back in Rome, he went to university (literature) and studied composition with Alfredo Casella and Cesare Dobici, obtaining his degree in composition at the Santa Cecilia Conservatory in Rome (1939) in only four years instead of the usual ten years required.

He studied conducting with Antonio Guarnieri in Siena, a city where not many years later he would teach himself, having amongst his pupils musicians like Zubin Mehta.

== Career ==
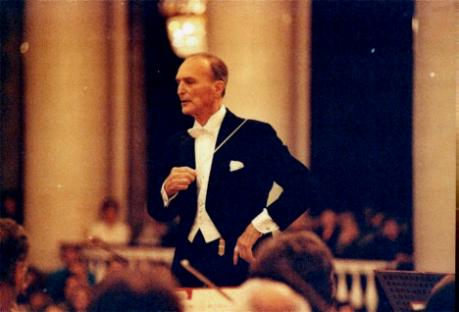
Conducting the St Petersburg Philharmonic in 1995

Mander conducted his first important concert at the Teatro della Fenice in Venice in 1942, after a period of apprenticeship at the same theatre. It was the beginning of a long career, which placed him in front of many of the most important orchestras worldwide.

In 1948 he was appointed principal conductor of the Orquesta Sinfònica de Madrid, taking it on extended tours through Spain and Portugal, conducting concerts in all the most important cities.

Between 1948 and 1951 he frequently served as visiting conductor with the Dublin-based Radio Éireann Symphony Orchestra and by 1955 he had become a well-known and appreciated guest in many countries: "Exceptional" is the comment of composer and critic Richard de Guide. The same adjective was used by many others in cities such as London:"A formidable conductor". Or:"Mr Mander proved himself a master of his players....He achieved a remarkable dramatic response from the LPO... A first rate musician. All in all, his Beethoven "V" Symphony was an exceptional performance. And Paris: Avec Mander l'O.N. brille dès les premières notes. With the same enthusiasm he was acclaimed in Milan, Moscow, Budapest, Sydney, Copenhagen, Amsterdam, Chicago, New York, Johannesburg, Buenos Aires, St Petersburg, and others.

In 1957 he toured the United States and Canada for three months conducting the Orchestra del Maggio Musicale Fiorentina of Florence. That same year he also led the USSR State Orchestra in Moscow.

From 1969 until 1976 he was chief conductor of the National Symphony Orchestra of the South African Broadcasting Corporation in Johannesburg, as well as maintaining a demanding schedule of guest conducting in various countries.

Back in Europe, Mander and his wife retired to Latisana in the Friuli region, in northern Italy, the region of his ancestors (the name Mander goes back to 1378 in the R.K. Church archives of a tiny village, Solimbergo, north of Latisana). From Friuli he continued to serve in guest conductor opportunities, albeit in a more relaxed way.

During this period he also increased his writing output. During the 1960x he had published articles in several magazines, such as "The importance of music in Dante's Divina Commedia", published in Elsinore, April 1964, Elsinore Editrice. His literary output consists of three novels and numerous short stories. Two of them, titled "Due racconti" have been published by Editrice.i.l.a. Palma, (Palermo, Italy and São Paulo, Brazil) in the "Meridiana" series.

== Compositions ==
- "Elegy for pianoforte" (1936)
- "Five pieces for pianoforte" (1936)
- "Romance for violin and pianoforte" (1937)
- "Racconto fiabesco – allegoria sinfonica" (1938)
- "Inno per banda" (1939)
- "Three Romances op 1. n. 1 for piano" (1940)
- "Romance op. 1. n. 2 for violin and piano" (1940)
- "Racconto Fiabesco op. 2 for orchestra" (1940)
- "The Final Voyage of Ulysses op. 3 for orchestra" (1942)
- "Prelude, Aria and Finale op. 4 for orchestra" (1943)
- "Largo op. 5 for orchestra" (1944)
- "Ouverture ("Diastaltica") op. 6 for orchestra" (1944)
- "String quartet in D op. 7" (1945)
- "Study op. 8 n.1 for piano" (1946)
- "Berceuse op. 8 n. 2 for piano" (1946)
- "Three Waltzes op. 8 n. 3 for piano" (1946)
- "Cello concerto op. 9" (1947), published by Casa Ricordi
- "Symphonic Variations on an Original Theme op. 10 for orchestra" (1948)
- "L'Usignolo, la Rosa e lo Scarabeo op. 11 for orchestra" (1949)
- "Walzer dell'eco for piano" (1950)
- "Symphony n. 1 in F mayor op. 12 (1951)", published by Ricordi
- "Tre Canti d'Amore op 13 for soprano and orchestra" (1952)
- "Fantasia op. 14 for orchestra" (1952)
- "Oratorio Europeo op. 15 for soloists, choir and orchestra" (1954)
- "Corale Profano op. 16, n. 1 for choir and orchestra" (1954)
- "Sera op. 16, n. 2 for piano" (1955)
- "Giovanna la Pazza op. 17. n. 1 Ouverture for orchestra" (1955)
- "Study for grand organ op. 17, n. 2" (1957)
- "Berceuse for chamber orchestra" (Latisana, 1994).

== Film ==
Francesco Mander composed and/or conducted various soundtracks for films produced by his father:

- La conquista dell'aria (1939) Music by Antonio Veretti, conducted by Francesco Mander;
- Piccolo alpino (1940) Music by Umberto Galassi and Armando Renzi, conducted by Francesco Mander;
- Pia de' Tolomei (1941) Music composed and conducted by Francesco Mander. (The text of the songs "Maggiolata", "Introduzione", "Morte di Pia" is by Francesco Mander)'
- Penne nere (1952) Music by Francesco Mander, conducted by Franco Ferrara;
- A Tale of Five Cities (it. Passaporto per l'oriente) (1951) Music by Francesco Mander, Joe Hajos, and Hans May;
- Mata Hari's Daughter (1954) Francesco Mander, conductor.

== Recordings ==
Mander has recorded for RCA and Fonit - Angelicum. For Idéal Audience, in the video series Classic Archive, he recorded: video/DVD Tschaikovsky violin concerto, Orchestre National de France de l'ORTF, soloist Ivry Gitlis. For EMI, he recorded: DVD Tschaikovsly violin concerto. Soloist Ivry Gitlis

== Honors ==
- Named Member of the Tiber Academy (l'Accademia Tiberina) (1965)
- Named Fellow of the San Fernando Royal Academy of Fine Arts (la Real Academia de Bellas Artes de San Fernando) in Madrid (1971)
- Named Commander of The Order of Merit of the Italian Republic
