= 1959 in Belgium =

- Decades: 1930s; 1940s; 1950s; 1960s; 1970s
- See also: Other events of 1959; List of years in Belgium

Events from the year 1959 in Belgium

== Incumbents ==
- Monarch: Baudouin
- Prime Minister: Gaston Eyskens

== Events ==
Demonstration against pit closures, 16 February 1959

- 4 January – Léopoldville riots in the Belgian Congo
- 16 February – Mass protests against the closing of coal mines in the Borinage region
- 2 July – Marriage of Prince Albert and Donna Paola Ruffo di Calabria in the Cathedral of St. Michael and St. Gudula, Brussels
- 17 July – Law on economic expansion provides subsidies and stimulus for economic growth.

== Publications ==
- Commercial information relative to the principal products of the Belgian Congo and Ruanda-Urundi (Brussels, Office de l'information et des relations publiques pour le Congo belge et le Ruanda-Urundi)
- André Franquin, Le gorille a bonne mine (comic album)

== Births ==
- 7 August – Koenraad Elst, Belgian Indologist
- 14 October – Pierre Jadoul, politician
- 26 November – Jacky Morael, politician (died 2016)

== Deaths ==
- 9 February – Nand Geersens (born 1895), broadcaster
- 8 March – Robert Van Eenaeme (born 1916), cyclist
