= André Chastel =

French art historian

André Chastel (15 November 1912, Paris – 18 July 1990, Neuilly-sur-Seine) was a French art historian, author of an important work on the Italian Renaissance.

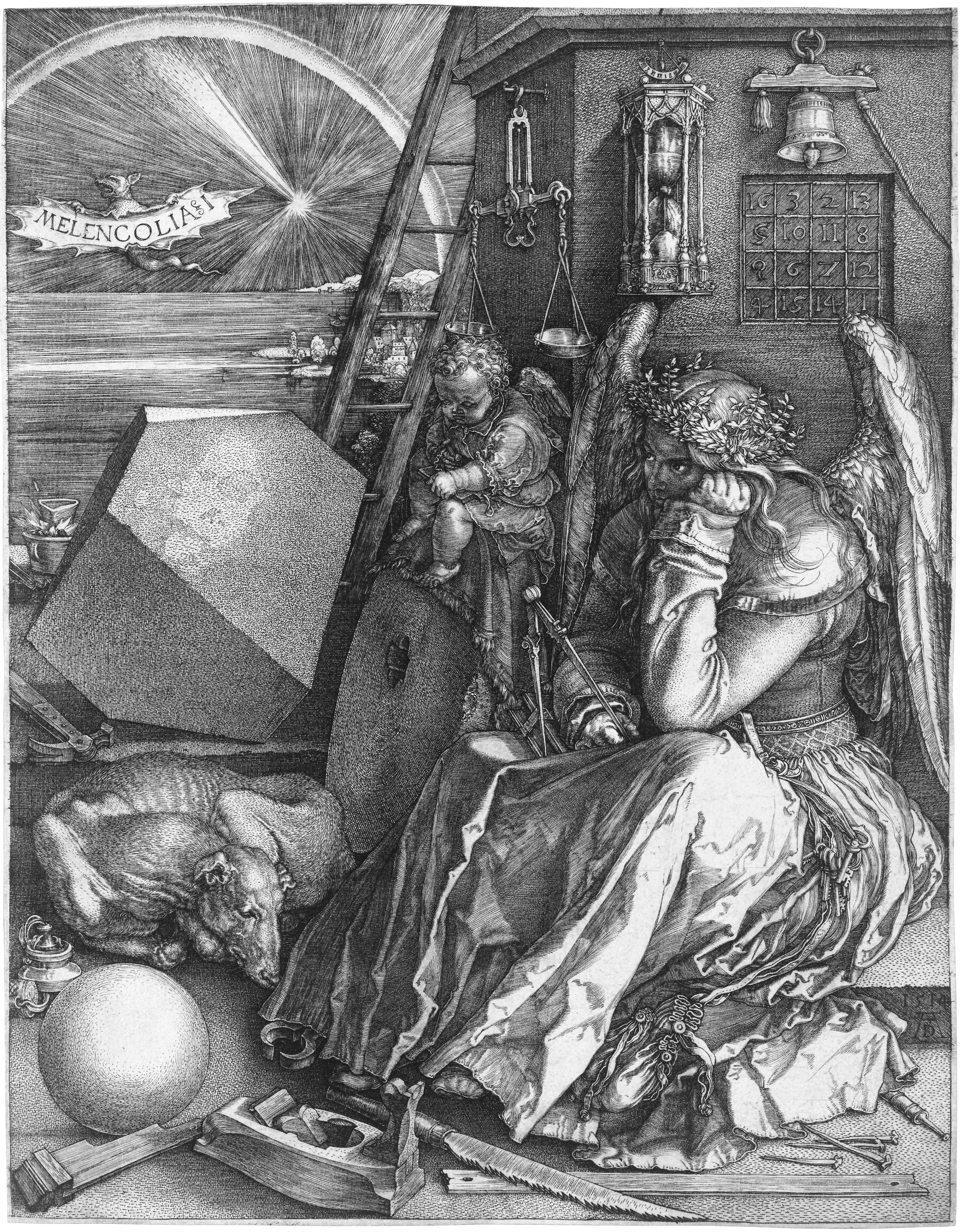

He was a professor at the Collège de France, where he held the chair of art and civilisation of the Renaissance in Italy, from 1970 to 1984, he was elected a member of the Académie des inscriptions et belles-lettres in 1975. He is buried at Ivry Cemetery, Ivry-sur-Seine.

== Publications ==
- Florentine Drawings, Hyperion, 1950
- Léonard de Vinci par lui-même, Édit. Nagel, 1952
- Marsile Ficin et l'art, Droz, Genève, 1954
- L'Art italien, 1956 (reprinted: 1982, 1989, 1995; Italian translation: 1957–1958, English translation: 1963)
- Botticelli, Silvana, Milan, 1957
- Art et Humanisme à Florence au temps de Laurent le Magnifique, P.U.F, 1959, 1961, 1982
- L'Âge de l'humanisme (with Robert Klein), Éditions de la connaissance, Bruxelles, 1963
- Le Grand Atelier d'Italie, 1460-1500, Gallimard, 1965
- Renaissance méridionale, 1460-1500, Gallimard, 1965
- Le Mythe de la Renaissance, 1420-1520, Skira, Genève, 1969
- La Crise de la Renaissance, 1520-1600, Skira, Genève, 1969
- Fables, formes, figures (2 volumes), Flammarion, 1978
- L'image dans le miroir, Gallimard, 1980
- Grotesque, l'Arpenteur, 1980
- Chronique de la peinture italienne à la Renaissance, 1250-1580, 1983
- Le sac de Rome, Gallimard, 1984
- L'Illustre Incomprise, Mona Lisa, Gallimard, 1988
- Histoire de l'art français, 4 volumes, 1992-1996
- La Pala ou le Retable italien des origines à 1500, 1993
- La gloire de Raphaël ou le triomphe d'Éros, RMN, 1995
- Giorgio Vasari, les Vies des meilleurs peintres sculpteurs et architectes, French translation of Lives of the Artists with notes, edited by André Chastel, Paris, Berger-Levrault, "Arts" collection, 12 vol., 1981–1989. Reissued, Actes Sud, "Thesaurus" collection, 2 vol., 2005.
