= 1960 in Belgium =

- Decades: 1940s; 1950s; 1960s; 1970s; 1980s
- See also: Other events of 1960; List of years in Belgium

Events in the year 1960 in Belgium.

== Incumbents ==
- Monarch: Baudouin
- Prime Minister: Gaston Eyskens

== Events ==
- 30 June – Belgian Congo becomes independent Republic of the Congo.
- 1 November – Treaty establishing Benelux Economic Union comes into force, providing for the free movement of persons, goods, capital and services between Belgium, the Netherlands, and Luxembourg.
- 15 December – King Baudouin marries Doña Fabiola de Mora y Aragón in Brussels.

== Art and architecture ==
Paintings

- René Magritte, Les mémoires d'un saint

== Births ==
- 15 April – Prince Philippe
- 12 July – Walter De Donder, actor and politician
- 18 October – Jean-Claude Van Damme, actor

== Deaths ==
- 8 March – Marie Janson, politician (born 1873)
