= Cesare Dobici =

Italian composer

- Born: December 12, 1873; Viterbo
- Died: April 25, 1944; Rome
- Citizenship: Italy
- Occupation: composer

Cesare Dobici (December 12, 1873 in Viterbo – April 25, 1944 in Rome) was an Italian composer.

Among his many compositions are a Requiem Mass written in 1900 for the funeral ceremony of King Umberto I of Italy (1844–1900). But his real fame stems from having been an outstanding teacher of harmony, especially the fugue and counterpoint. And this attracted not only Italian pupils, but also aspiring composers - for both secular and sacred music - from countries as far away as Portugal, Venezuela, Argentina, to only name a few.

He taught at what at that time was the "Reale Conservatorio Musicale di S. Cecilia" (Royal Conservatory of Music S. Cecilia), now the Accademia Nazionale di Santa Cecilia in Rome and also at the "Scuola Superiore di Musica Sacra", belonging to the Vatican. Among his pupils he counts distinguished Italian composers such as: Carlo Alberto Pizzini, Giorgio Colarezzi, Ennio Porrino, Francesco Mander, Biagio Grimaldi, Angelo Turriziani, Enrico Buondonno, Vieri Tosatti.
