= Ireland Reaching Out =

Non-profit organization headquartered in Galloway, Ireland

- Nickname: Ireland XO
- Formation: 2009; 17 years ago
- Founder: Mike Feerick
- Founded at: Galway, Ireland
- Legal status: Non-profit organization
- Headquarters: Galway Technology Park, Parkmore, Galway, Ireland
- Chairperson: Mike Feerick
- Website: www.irelandxo.com

Ireland Reaching Out, also known as Ireland XO, is a non-profit, volunteer and community-based organization headquartered in Galway, Ireland. It was founded by Mike Feerick in 2009. The organization aims to build lasting links between the Irish diaspora and the civil parishes in Ireland. Currently, the organization has more than 100,000 members around the world with 32 volunteer networks across Ireland, including Northern Ireland.

== Background and history ==
In Ireland, civil parishes are considered administrative offices and maintain civil records of their parishioners who emigrated to another country. Utilizing these records through a network of volunteer-based groups, Ireland Reaching Out assists Irish descendants in rediscovering their family history.

The organization first started as a pilot project in South East Galway, Ireland, in 2009.

During the Irish recession in the late 2000s, Irish social entrepreneur Mike Feerick wanted to help the rejuvenation of the Irish economy by tapping into the power of this Irish diaspora. He said that "There are 70 to 80 million people with Irish heritage, living around the world. Many of them don’t even have an idea that they have their roots on the island. And each of them has a connection to at least one Irish parish."

In 2015, Ireland Reaching Out partnered with Google to begin mapping Irish houses so people could see who had lived there in the past. In December 2011, the organization launched a global partnership with Gaelic Athletic Association (GAA) to link members of the Irish diaspora to GAA's network of 500 clubs worldwide. On 14 March 2012, Taoiseach Enda Kenny and the organization launched the national "reverse genealogy" program. By March 2013, the volunteer network had reached 32 counties of Ireland, having at least 2000 volunteers and being active in at least 800 civil parishes.

On 19 June 2015, Ireland Reaching Out launched its enhanced website at Iveagh House, Dublin, Ireland, which was announced by the Jimmy Deenihan, the Minister for Diaspora Affairs.

In September 2015, "Epic Journeys Ellis Island", an online exhibition, was launched in Tulla, County Clare, Ireland. A result of extensive research by Ireland Reaching Out with support of the Department of Foreign Affairs, the exhibition focuses on the stories of 71 residents from Tulla who had left Ireland in the early 19th century to emigrate to New York. It was launched in hopes that similar exhibitions and research at the parish level can be replicated.

== Methods and funding ==
The organization operates in a civil parish basis. Volunteers are able to contact the living descendants of the parishioners who had settled in another country, and volunteers invite these descendants to uncover their own genealogical history, a method known as "reverse genealogy". For people to trace their Irish roots, they only need to post queries in the civil registries. Another method is by registering through the organization's website. By registering, the user will then be able to search and join a civil parish.

The organization's volunteers offer a "Meet & Greet" service for returning diaspora. They welcome the visitors to the local community, help them with any specific genealogical queries they have and show them places of historical significance, such as local graveyards, churches and homesteads. In 2018, this service was provided to 300 groups of visitors.

The organization is mainly funded by the Department of Foreign Affairs of Ireland, through its Emigrant Support Programme, and the Heritage Council. The organization is also funded by Google, Inc. through its Google Enterprise program. It also generates small revenues through Google AdSense.

== Awards ==
The Ireland Reaching Out is a recipient of a special award at the Pride of Place Awards in November 2012. It was also voted as the Best Community Initiative nationally by the Local Authorities Members Awards.
