= Jeanine De Landtsheer =

Belgian classicist (1954–2021)

Jeanine de Landtsheer (1954–2021) was a Belgian classicist who edited six volumes of the correspondence of Justus Lipsius and a number of works by Desiderius Erasmus.

== Life ==
De Landtsheer was born in Mechelen on 18 January 1954 and was educated at the Ursuline school there. She went on to study classical philology at the University of Antwerp and at the KU Leuven, graduating with a licentiate degree in 1975. She then became a teacher of Latin and art history at the Regina Pacis Institute, Hove. She obtained a doctorate in 1993, and went on to edit several volumes of Lipsius's correspondence and a number of works by Erasmus, as well as writing essays and articles on classical studies in the Renaissance. She died at home in Hove on 18 January 2021.

== Works ==
- with G. Tournoy and J. Papy (eds.), Lipsius en Leuven, exhibition catalogue (Leuven, 1997)
- Justus Lipsius (1547–1606), een geleerde en zijn Europese netwerk (Leuven, 2006)
- In Pursuit of the Muses: The Life and Work of Justus Lipsius, posthumously edited by Marijke Crab and Ide François (Ghent, 2021)

=== Iusti Lipsi Epistolae ===
- Iusti Lipsi Epistolae, pars IV: 1591 (Brussels, 2012)
- with J. Kluyskens, Iusti Lipsi Epistolae, pars V: 1592 (Brussels, 1991)
- Iusti Lipsi Epistolae, pars VI: 1593 (Brussels, 1994)
- Iusti Lipsi Epistolae, pars VII: 1594 (Brussels, 1997)
- Iusti Lipsi Epistolae, pars VIII: 1595 (Brussels, 2004)
- Iusti Lipsi Epistolae, pars X: 1597 (forthcoming)
- with Sylvette Sué, Iusti Lipsi Epistolae, pars XIV: 1601 (Brussels, 2006)
