= Mireille Versele =

Mireille Jeanne Eugénie Versele (1956–1982) was a Belgian cystic fibrosis campaigner who founded the first international association for young adults with the disease.

== Life ==
Versele was born in Schaerbeek (Brussels) on 19 June 1956. Despite her health issues, she successfully studied Germanic philology at university. In 1982, on the occasion of the International Cystic Fibrosis Conference held in Brussels under the patronage of Queen Fabiola, Versele launched the International Association of Cystic Fibrosis Adults (IACFA), with members from 15 different countries. She died in Brussels on 4 November 1982.
