= Louis Hymans =

Belgian writer, lecturer and politician

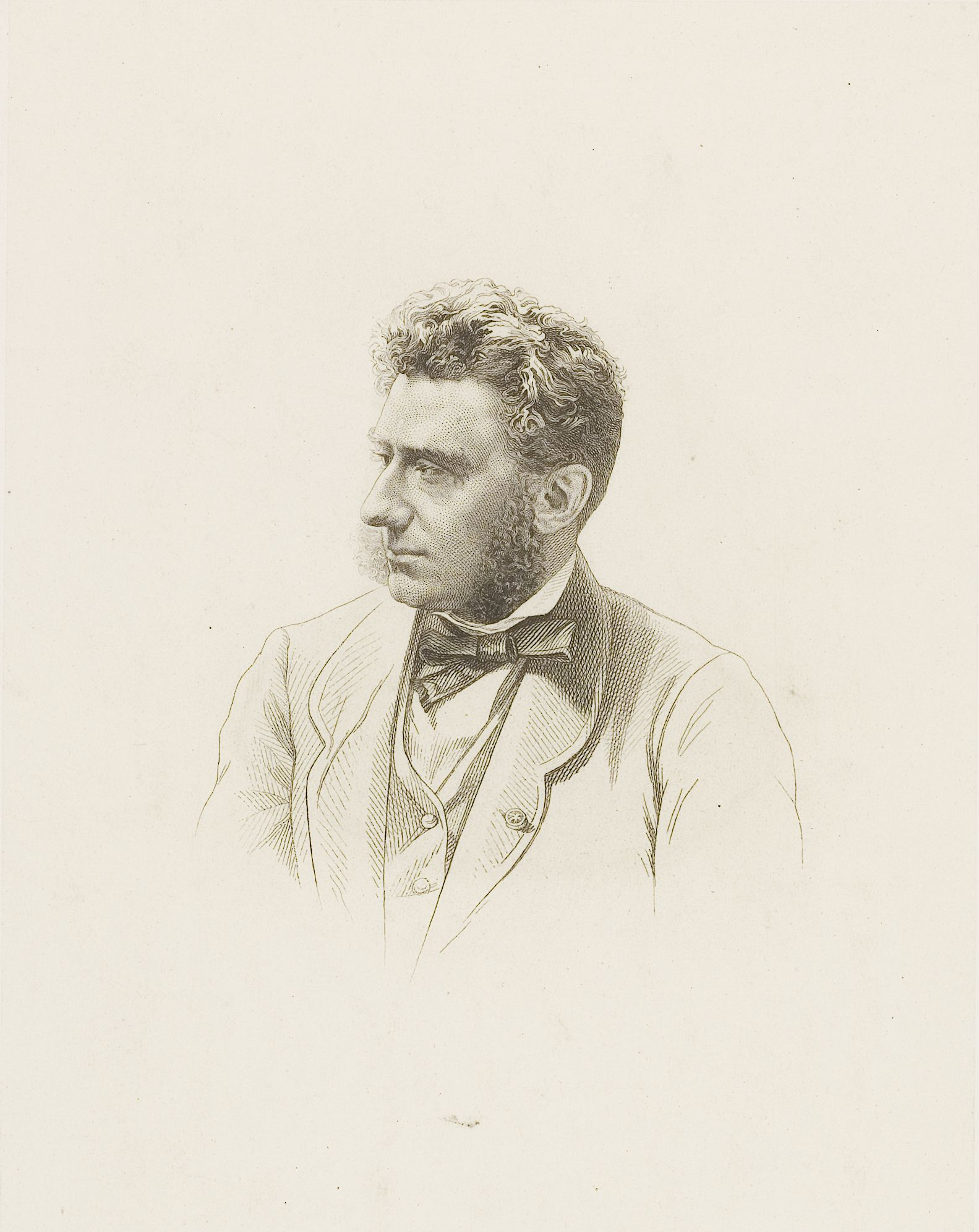
Louis Hymans

Louis Hymans (1829—1884) was a Belgian writer, lecturer and politician.

== Life ==
Hymans was born in Rotterdam on 3 May 1829 to a Jewish doctor originally from Dordrecht. In the year of his birth his family moved to what would soon become Belgium. They first lived in Brussels and later in Antwerp, where Louis attended the state secondary school. After a run-in with a teacher he had lampooned, he completed his secondary education in Ghent while living with a family friend, Henri Moke. He went on to study philosophy and letters at Ghent University, while beginning to build a literary reputation by writing for the stage.

His father died in 1848, obliging him to abandon his studies and focus on earning a living through writing, primarily as a journalist. From 1850 to 1856 he was a frequent contributor to L'Indépendance Belge, as well as to other periodicals. In 1856 he covered the coronation of Alexander II of Russia for Le Nord, and from 1857 to 1859 he was the editor-in-chief of L'Etoile Belge. From 1853 he also taught national history at the Musée de l'Industrie and became a public lecturer.

From 1859 to 1870, Hymans sat in the Belgian Chamber of Representatives as a "doctrinaire" member of the Liberal Party, frequently speaking in debates and taking a particular interest in intellectual property, state education, the civil service, child labour, the language question, and electoral reform. From 1866 to 1878 he was the director of L'Echo du Parlement Belge.

On 10 May 1880 he was elected a corresponding member of the Royal Academy of Science, Letters and Fine Arts of Belgium. He died in Ixelles on 22 May 1884 and was buried in Ixelles Cemetery. His son Paul Hymans, likewise a Liberal politician, would twice serve as president of the League of Nations.

== Publications ==
- Robert le Frison, drame en trois actes (1847), first performed Ghent, 17 March 1847
- Le Gondolier de Venise, opéra comique (1847), first performed Antwerp
- Les Jeux innocents (1852), first performed at the Théâtre Royal des Galeries, Brussels, 23 October 1852
- Cours public et gratuit d'histoire nationale (1854), inaugural lecture given at Brussels Town Hall, 4 November 1854
- Le Parti de la paix au Parlement d'Angleterre (1854), translations of the parliamentary speeches of Gladstone, Cobden, Bright, Sidney-Herbert and Sir James Graham relating to the Crimean War
- Notice historique sur le port d'Anvers (1854)
- Belgique depuis 1830 (1855), a poem marking the 25th anniversary of Belgian independence
- La famille Baroni (1855)
- Les fêtes de juillet 1856 (1856), describing the celebration of the 25th anniversary of the Belgian monarchy
- Le Jardin zoologique de Bruxelles (1856)
- Les lettres moscovites (1857)
- L'Église et les libertés belges (1857)
- La famille Buvard, scènes de mœurs bruxelloises (1858)
- Cantate pour l'inauguration de la Colonne du Congrès (1859)
- Des enquêtes parlementaires en Angleterre et en France, à propos de l'enquête sur les élections de Louvain (1859)
- La question italienne (1860)
- Histoire populaire de la Belgique (1860)
- Le Rhin monumental et pittoresque (1860)
- André Bailly, roman (1861)
- Discours prononcé à la Chambre des Représentants, le 8 décembre 1861 (1862)
- Histoire populaire du règne de Léopold Ier roi des Belges (1864)
- Histoire politique et parlementaire de la Belgique, de 1814 à 1830, vol. 1 (1869)
- Lord Palmerston, la France et la Belgique (1831) (1871)
- Notes et souvenirs (1876)
- Types et Silhouettes (1877)
- Manuel de l'histoire de Belgique à l'usage des écoles primaires (1879)
- Réforme électorale (1880)
- La Belgique contemporaine (1880)
- Histoire parlementaire de la Belgique de 1831 à 1881 (3 vols, 1881–1883)
- Le Congrès national de 1830 et la Constitution de 1831 (1882)
- Bruxelles à travers les âges (1884)
- Journal d'un voyage en Russie (1884)
