= Maria Doolaeghe =

Flemish writer

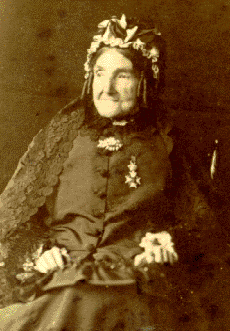
- Born: 25 October 1803; Diksmuide
- Died: 7 April 1884 (aged 80); Diksmuide
- Occupation: writer

Maria Doolaeghe (25 October 1803 – 7 April 1884) was a Flemish writer.

== Bibliography ==
- Nederduitsche letteroefeningen (1834)
- Madelieven (1840)
- De avondlamp (1850)
- Sinte Godelieve, Vlaemsche legende uit de XIde eeuw (1862)
- Winterbloemen (1868)
- Najaarsvruchten (1869)
- Madelieven en avondlamp (1876)
- Najaarsvruchten en winterbloemen (1877)
- Nieuwste gedichten (1878)
- Jongste dichtbundel (1884)

== See also ==
- Flemish literature

== Sources ==
- Maria Doolaeghe
- G.J. van Bork en P.J. Verkruijsse, De Nederlandse en Vlaamse auteurs (1985)
