= Fernand Faniard =

Belgian singer (1894–1955)

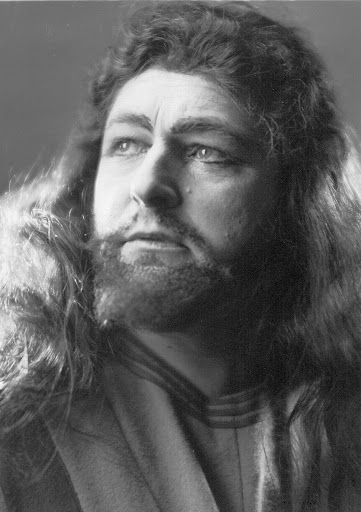

Fernand Smeets, better known under the name Fernand Faniard, 9 December 1894 in Saint-Josse-ten-Noode – 3 August 1955 in Paris) was a tenor of the Paris Opera, born in Brussels and naturalized French in 1949.

He was the son of "cafeteria owner" Lambert Leopold Jules Steems and Maria Joseph Marguerite Fagniard. Fernand's stage name refers to his mother's surname as a tribute.

He received his musical training at the Royal Conservatory of Brussels with Laurent Swofs. His vocal range at the time was baritone. In that capacity he could also be seen and heard in the Royal Monnaie Theatre in Brussels. He left that theatre in 1926 for the Flemish Opera in Antwerp and was retrained as a tenor by Tilkin Servais and Eric Audoin. In 1928, he gave a guest performance at the Opera of Monte Carlo. He would return there regularly until 1934. Other performances took place in Paris, Marseille, Lyon, Toulouse, Nice and Rouen. He returned occasionally to the Monnaie Theatre, but also to Liège, for example. He sang in Parma, but also in Algiers and Oran. In 1951, he sang in Strasbourg in the French premiere of the opera Mathis der Mahler by Paul Hindemith.

According to Robijns, his voice was not popular in Italy because it was too classical. In 1929, he performed at Schouwburg Casino in Den Bosch. His voice has been preserved on several recordings. He is buried at Ivry Cemetery, Ivry-sur-Seine.
