= Belgian Chamber of Translators and Interpreters =

The Belgian Chamber of Translators and Interpreters (Chambre belge des Traducteurs et Interprètes / Belgische Kamer van Vertalers en Tolken - CBTI/BKVT) is a non-profit professional association that was founded on April 16, 1955 in Brussels. The Chamber works to advance the profession and the recognition of specific skills and abilities of translators and interpreters in Belgium. It seeks to make players and users of translation and interpretation services more aware of the importance of quality and responsibility.

As preferred contact for anyone using translation and interpretation services, for public authorities and for courts, the Chamber has been a member of the International Federation of Translators (FIT) since 1956.

== History ==
The Belgian Chamber of translators, interpreters and philologists (CBTIP/BKVTF) was founded in Brussels in 1955 (the memorandum of association was published in the Belgian Official Gazette of May 14, 1955) by Hugo Singer, Adolphe Van Mulders, Julien D'Archembeau, Henri Van Hoof, Enrico Angelini, Cambien R. and Max Mandart. The positions of the first Board were held by Hugo Singer, as president, Julien D'Archembeau, as vice-president, and Henri Van Hoof, as secretary general, under whose direction the first issue of Le Linguiste/De Taalkundige, the association's periodical, would be published in 1955.

There were no educational programmes for translators or interpreters when the Chamber was established and setting up programmes specifically for the sector became one of its first objectives. As such, the Chamber would play a role in the successive founding of all the institutes that exist today.

In 1956, the Chamber joined the International Federation of Translators (FIT) and has been a very active member of this federation ever since.

In 1970, the Chamber was recognised by the judicial authorities of Brussels as the organiser of the sworn translators' examination. Many other courts in the country have subsequently asked the Chamber to evaluate the skills of potential sworn translators.

In 1984 and 1985, the Chamber started developing contacts with the Ministry of Small Enterprises and Traders (Ministère des Classes moyennes), which recognised the Chamber as the representative for the translation profession. In 2001, the association's headquarters moved to rue Ravenstein/Ravensteinstraat in Brussels where for the first time a permanent secretarial service was set up and an administrative assistant was hired.

In 2002, the Chamber lodged draft legislation to regulate the status of sworn translators and interpreters. On July 1, 2005, the Chamber's headquarters moved to 24 de la rue Montoyer/Montoyerstraat in Brussels.

In February 2006, the Chamber regained a seat on the upper council for self-employed persons and SMEs, an event that forms the culmination of the recognition of the professions of translator and interpreter. That same year, the Chamber became affiliated with the FVIB (Federatie van de Vrije en Intellectuele Beroepen) and the UNPLIB (Union des Professions Libérales et Intellectuelles de Belgique), which are both federations of freelance and intellectual professions in Belgium. During its annual general meeting in 2013, the association decided to change its name to “Chambre belge des Traducteurs et Interprètes” (CBTI)/“Belgische Kamer van Vertalers en Tolken” (BKVT). The same meeting saw new internal rules and new articles of association voted into force allowing for the creation of a category of members called “trainees”. The objective of this new category is to accept and assist translators who do not have degrees and who do not have at least three years' professional experience.

On July 3, 2013, for the first time in its history, the Chamber was invited to the Belgian Justice Commission of the Chamber of Representatives to participate in its recommendations on the three bills being discussed on the status of sworn translators and interpreters, which should be resolved by October 2013 at the latest. These three bills are all based on the drafts lodged by the Chamber in 2002.

== Structure ==
=== Bodies ===
==== General Assembly ====
The general assembly is the supreme governing body of the association and determines the general policy of the Chamber.

==== Board of directors ====
The board of directors is the Chamber's management body. The officers, who number a maximum of fifteen, are elected by the general meeting for two-year terms. They are tasked with a number of responsibilities in the context of managing and representing the Chamber. The positions of the officers are unpaid.

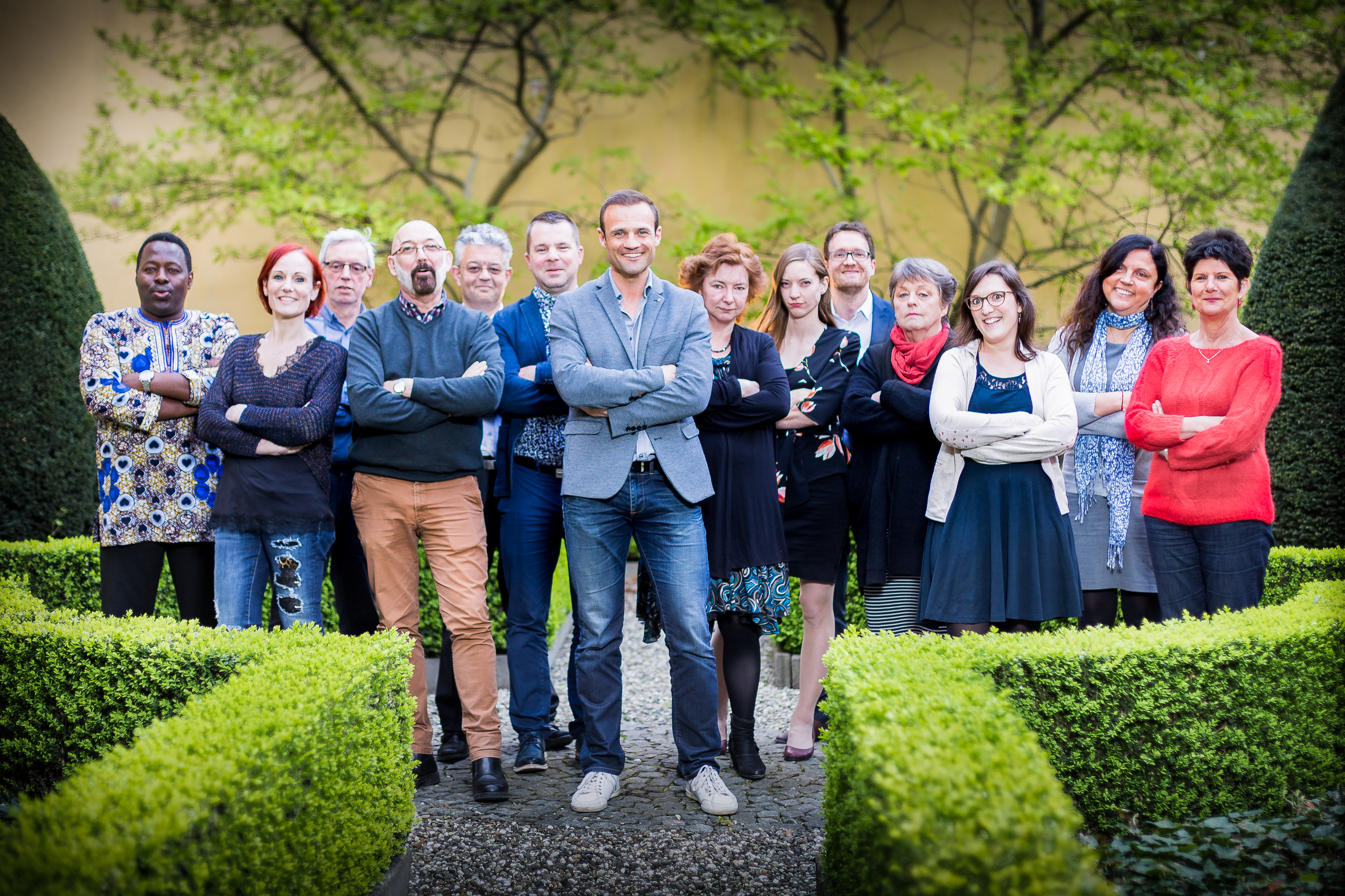
CBTI Board of Directors 2017

==== Dispute resolution ====
The Chamber has two bodies for resolving disputes: an arbitration committee and a disciplinary board.

=== Presidents of the Chamber from 1955 to present ===
- 1955 - 1962 : Hugo Singer
- 1962–1971 : Henri Van Hoof
- 1971–1973 : A. Van Lul
- 1973 - 1974 : Gustave Cammaert
- 1974–1978 : A. Wautier
- 1978 - 1997 : Jean-Bernard Quicheron
- 1997 - 2005 : Doris Grollmann
- 2005 - 2013 : Agnès Feltkamp
- 2013 - 2015 : Ludovic Pierard
- 2015 - 2017 : Rita Roggen
- 2017 - 2021 : Guillaume Deneufbourg
- 2021–present: Sébastien Devogele

== Members ==
The Chamber's membership includes both freelance and salaried translators. There are currently approximately 400 members, established both in Belgium and abroad, who work in about one hundred language combinations. Each member has areas of specialisation and respects the principle of using his or her native language as target language. To become full members, candidates must hold a Belgian or foreign master's in a linguistic specialty or have at least three years' professional experience. While waiting to meet these criteria, any one active in the profession may become a member as a trainee.

== Code of Conduct ==
On joining the Chamber, each member agrees to respect the provisions of the code of conduct.

== External contacts ==
=== Contact with the market and with the authorities ===
The Chamber is working to make professional associations, companies, ministries and other bodies seeking translation and interpreting services aware of its members and their profession. To this end, it regularly attends meetings, participates in trade fairs and symposiums and relays offers and communications from international organisations to its members.

=== Collaboration with inter-professional associations ===
The Chamber is a member of UNPLIB (Union nationale des professions libérales et intellectuelles) and FVIB (Federatie voor Vrije en Intellectuele Beroepen). It is because of these affiliations that the Chamber plays a role on the political stage in decisions that relate to its professions. Given that UNPLIB is a platform for communication with the Union des classes moyennes (UCM, the federation of small firms and traders) and that the FVIB is associated with Unie van Zelfstandige Ondernemers (Unizo, the union of freelancers), Chamber members may also take advantage of a wide selection of conferences and other training sessions at very reasonable prices while the Chamber is represented at the European level.

The Chamber has a seat on sectoral Commission 15 (“Other freelance and intellectual professions of the Higher Council of freelancers and SMEs”) as a national professional association. The Chamber has hence acquired national recognition: it is the only association in Belgium known for being able to defend translators and interpreters.

=== International Cooperation ===
The Chamber has been a member of the International Federation of Translators (FIT) since January 1, 1956. Recognised by UNESCO, FIT unites 107 translator associations in over 60 countries. Many Chamber members regularly participate in the various committees created within FIT, as well as on the editorial board of BaBel, its official publication.

The Chamber maintains close ties with many translation and interpreting associations in other countries, especially in the context of the Franco-German, Franco-English and Franco-Spanish networks.

== See also ==
- International Federation of Translators (FIT)
- Union des classes moyennes (UCM)
- Unie van Zelfstandige Ondernemers (Unizo)
