= Luc De Schepper =

Belgian physicist (1957–2022)

- Born: 22 April 1957; Merksem, Antwerp, Belgium
- Died: 19 December 2022 (aged 65); Hasselt, Belgium
- Occupations: Physicist and professor

Luc De Schepper (22 April 1957 – 19 December 2022) was a Belgian physicist and professor. De Schepper was rector of the Hasselt University from 2004 to 2020. He was chairman of the Flemish Interuniversity Council from 2015 to 2017.

De Schepper studied physics at the University of Antwerp and obtained his doctorate at the Hasselt University in 1983. From 1997 to 2003 he was head of the Department of Mathematics, Physics and Computer Science, from 1999 to 2004 he was director of the Institute for Materials Research (IMO), a research institute of the Hasselt University, and from 2003 to 2004 he was dean of the Faculty of Science of the Hasselt University.

De Schepper died on 19 December 2022, at the age of 65.
