= Ferrick =

Ferrick is a surname. Notable people with the surname include:

- Colleen Ferrick (born 1942), New Zealand lawn bowler
- Melissa Ferrick (born 1970), American singer-songwriter
- Tom Ferrick (born 1949), American journalist, son of Tom
- Tom Ferrick (1915–1996), American baseball player, coach, and scout
