= Renaud Hardy =

Belgian serial killer (1962–2026)

- Born: 1 April 1962; Mechelen, Belgium
- Died: 9 July 2026 (aged 64); Bruges, Belgium
- Other name: "The Parkinson's Murderer"
- Conviction: Murder
- Penalty: Life imprisonment

Details
- Victims: 3
- Span of crimes: 2009–2015
- Country: Belgium
- State: Flemish Region
- Date apprehended: 21 September 2015

Renaud Hardy (1 April 1962 – 9 July 2026), known as The Parkinson's Murderer, was a Belgian serial killer who was sentenced to life imprisonment for murder, rape, and attempted murder in 2018. His Parkinson's diagnosis and the disease's influence on his actions received much attention during his trial.

== Arrest ==
On 16 September 2015, Linda Doms was murdered in Zemst, Flemish Brabant. Her corpse was discovered a few days later by a neighbour. Several people were interviewed, including Hardy, a former friend of Doms. Initially, the investigators had no evidence of Hardy's involvement, and he was released. When the investigators found images on Hardy's memory card showing the crime scene, Hardy was rearrested on 21 September 2015.

During the arrest, the Mechelen court again opened an investigation into older files. From DNA traces, a link was established to the murder of 82-year-old Marie Walschaerts, which was committed in Leest in May 2014, and an attempted murder in September 2014 in Bonheiden. He is also the suspected perpetrator of an attack on Belgian actress Veerle Eyckermans in February 2015, who at the time lived near Hardy. He is also considered responsible for the murder of an 85-year-old in Boortmeerbeek in December 2011.

Hardy had been arraigned a week before Doms's murder, with the help of sex offender Doris Corbeel, because in 2014 he had shot a passer-by with an air gun. In his own words, he saw the woman riding on the bike and suddenly had the urge to harm her.

== Parkinson's disease ==
In 2007, doctors diagnosed Hardy with Parkinson's disease. The disease and its influence on his actions received much attention during his trial, with some Belgian media even calling him the "Parkinson's murderer". It was also mentioned that he took medicine to treat the disease, where a well-known neurologist, Chris Van Der Linden, stated that he had become a murderer due to the addicting medication. Also during the trial, Hardy's defence often cited the disease as a mitigating factor.

== Condemnation ==
The trial began on 9 February 2018. After almost a month, on 8 March 2018, Hardy was declared guilty by the people's jury. He was sentenced to life imprisonment.

== Death ==
Hardy died at a prison of heart failure in Bruges on 9 July 2026, at the age 64.

== See also ==
- List of serial killers by country
