= Marguerite Devigne =

- Born: 10 December 1884; Dinant, Belgium
- Died: November 1967 (aged 82); Dilbeek, Belgium
- Other name: Mlle Marg. Devigne
- Education: University of Liège (Ph.D.)
- Occupation: Curator

Marguerite Devigne (10 December 1884 – November 1967) was a Belgian art historian specializing in sculpture, particularly in Mosan art (from the Meuse valley). During World War II, she took over as curator of the Royal Museums of Fine Arts of Belgium, which, after the war, led to accusations of collaboration and her acrimonious departure from the institution.

== Early life ==
Devigne was born on 10 December 1884 in Dinant, Belgium.

Devigne studied art history and archaeology at the University of Liège. When she obtained her doctoral degree in 1912, she was the first female doctor of art history in Belgium. Her dissertation, on medieval art in the Meuse valley, was granted from the university with Marcel Laurent as her dissertation supervisor. In Paris, she studied with André Michel at the École du Louvre.

== Career ==
Between 1915 and 1949, she held several positions at the Royal Museums of Fine Arts in Brussels. In 1923, she published the Catalogue de la sculpture, which includes a considerable number of nineteenth-century works of Belgian artists. In 1928, she was appointed assistant curator and in 1935 curator. In addition to her work in the museum, she was professor of the history of costume at the Royal Academy of Fine Arts, Brussels. She also taught the history of sculpture at the École des Hautes Études in Ghent, and art history at the École Normale Provinciale d'Instituteurs in Morlanwelz.

She regularly published articles in various periodicals as well as a number of books. She was a contributor to the Biographie nationale de Belgique, issued by the Royal Academy. She also contributed to the Thieme-Becker Allgemeines Lexikon der bildenden Künstler and to the Enciclopedia Italiana. Her magnum opus, La sculpture mosane du XIIe au XVIe siècle, the publication of which was delayed by World War I, appeared in 1932. The work is an elaborate and learned essay which provides great deal of information and documentation on the larger cultural contexts in which the arts in the Meuse valley flourished and developed. Devigne was particularly interested in aspects of stylistic relationships between the sculptors in the Meuse valley and artists in Germany, France, Flanders and Italy.

While Germany occupied Belgium during World War II, Devigne replaced the chief curator of the Royal Museums of Fine Arts, Léo Van Puyvelde, who was living in exile in England. During this period, she continued to grow the museum's collection, facilitating, for example, the 1942 donation of the della Faille de Leverghem painting collection, for which she produced a catalogue. Devigne had the difficult task of dealing with the Nazi occupiers so that the museum could continue to host exhibits and events, and persuading them to leave the museum's collection intact. After the 1944 Liberation of Belgium, her relationship with the Germans was criticized, and Arthur Laes (1876–1959) replaced her as curator until Van Puyvelde returned the next year. Although the comité de patronage praised her conduct during the war and made several proposals to keep her in her position, she was targeted by the Belgian press, and in 1949 departed the museum acrimoniously. Her image recovered in 1951 when the journal Front was convicted of libeling Devigne in its publications, a judgment which was confirmed by an appeals court the next year.

== Later life ==
After her retirement, Devigne made a long visit to the United States. She produced a short English overview of the history of sculpture in Belgium, which appeared in New York, in the series Art Treasures of Belgium. Devigne's died in November 1967 in Dilbeek (although some biographies report 1965).

== Selected works ==
- La sculpture au Pays de Liège du XIVe à la fin du XVIe siècle. Université de Liège, 1911–1912 (dissertation)
- Constantin Meunier. Turnhout: Brepols, 1919
- Thomas Vinçotte. Turnhout: Brepols, 1919
- "Musée Royal des Beaux-Arts de Belgique". Catalogue de la sculpture. Brussels: Weissenbruch, 1923
- Van Eyck. Brussels: L. J. Kryn, 1926
- Laurent Delvaux et ses élèves: De la parenté d’inspiration des artistes flamands du XVIIe et du XVIIIe siècle. Brussels: Van Oest, 1928
- La sculpture mosane du XIIe au XVIe siècle: contribution à l’étude de l’art dans la région de la Meuse moyenne. Brussels: Van Oest, 1932
- Collection della Faille de Leverghem. Brussels: Musées royaux des beaux-arts de Belgique, 1944
- Art Treasures of Belgium. New York: Belgian Govt. Information Center, 1951.
- Esquisse de l’histoire du costume en Belgique. Brussels: Pawwels Fils, 1952
- Art Treasures of Belgium: Sculpture. New York: Belgian Govt. Information Center, 1954.
