= En 50 ans =

- Directed by: Gérard De Boe
- Produced by: Paul Leleu
- Cinematography: François Rents Fernand Tack
- Music by: David Van De Woestyne
- Release date: 1958
- Running time: 21 minutes
- Country: Belgium

En 50 ans is a Belgian 1958 documentary film.

== Synopsis ==
The film commemorates the 50 years of colonisation in Upper Katanga. The commentator alludes to a population "stuck in its own traditions" that needs to learn new technologies. Workers from Ruanda-Urundi land at Elizabethville's airport to work in the mines. First they are driven to "acclimatisation reserves", and later they will be relocated to workers’ quarters. A tribute to the colonial heritage and its creation of, amongst other things, schools, hospitals, maternity wards and orphanages.
