= Mike Feerick =

Irish social entrepreneur

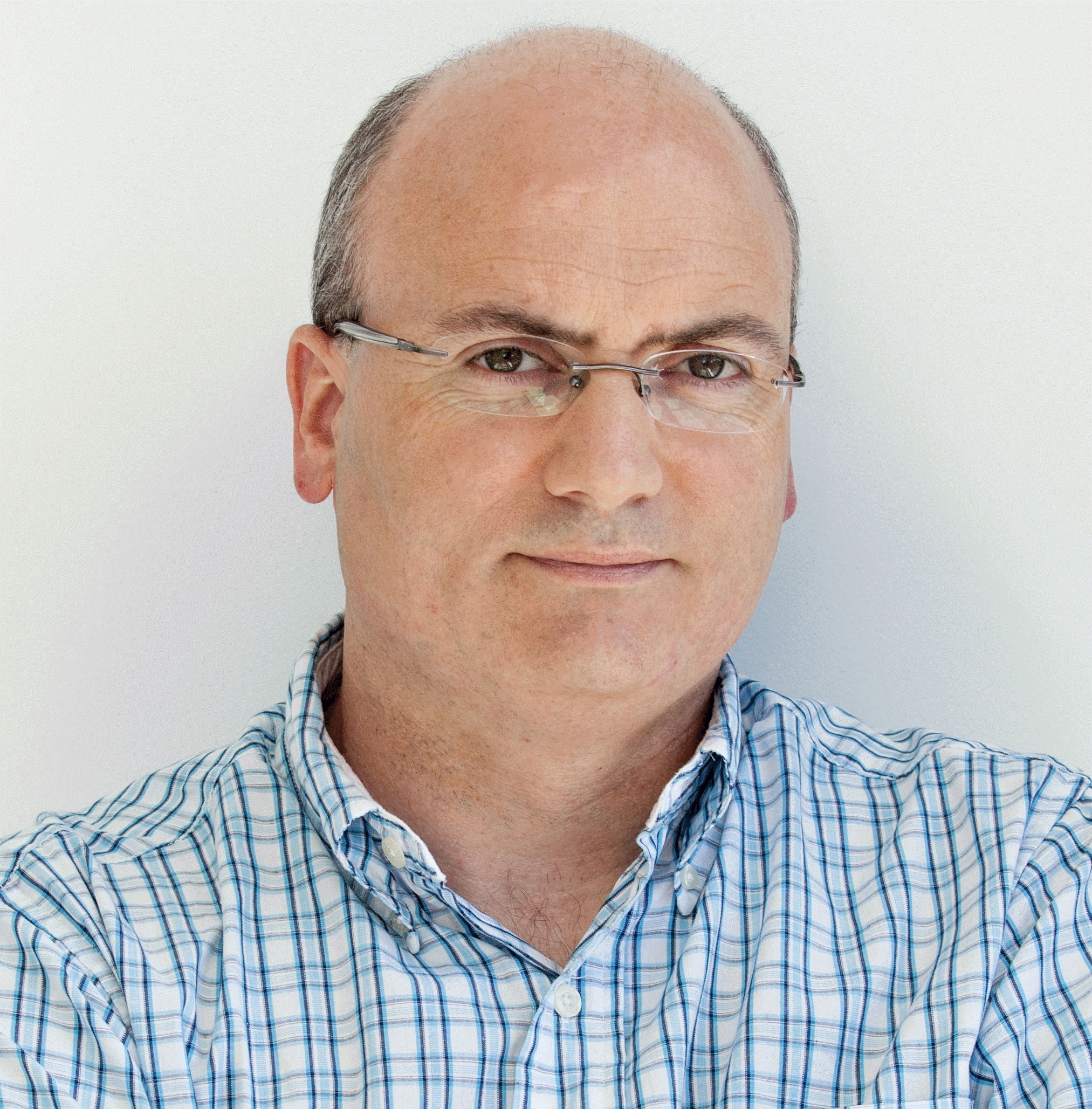
- Mike Feerick in 2013
- Born: New York, USA
- Education: Harvard University; University of Limerick
- Occupations: Founder, CEO of Alison; Founder, former CEO of Yac.com; Chairman of Ireland Reaching Out Project

Mike Feerick, an Irish social entrepreneur, is the founder and CEO of Alison, an e-learning company based in Ireland.

He is an Ashoka Fellow.

Feerick is also the founder of Ireland Reaching Out, a "reverse" genealogy project based in Ireland that reconnects Irish diaspora with their ancestral roots in Ireland.

== Career ==
Born in New York City, but raised in Limerick and Galway, Ireland, Mike Feerick sought a Harvard MBA but first gained an internship with philanthropist and early mentor Chuck Feeney. Feerick credits Feeney with helping to foster his particular interest in social entrepreneurship, stating that working with Feeney also made him realise that the best way to address any social issue was to create a sustainable business model around the need.

Feerick has served as the acting managing director of Interactive Investor International and has also held positions with Bertelsmann Music Group. He previously owned the franchise rights to JFAX Ireland, which was sold to Esat Telecom in 1999, an Irish telecommunications company. He is also the founder and former CEO of Yac.com, a web-based unified messaging telecoms provider. Feerick sold Yac to Nasdaq-listed J2 Global Communications in 2007.

Feerick set up the precursor to Alison, an e-learning sub-contracting business for Microsoft called Advance Learning in 2000, a business that developed into a specialist providing training for the ECDL (European Computer Driving Licence) desktop training certification.

== Alison ==
Feerick launched Alison as a for-profit social enterprise on 21 April 2007, a MOOC-based educational technology platform. In outlining the basis of Alison's operation, he explained to David Bornstein of the New York Times that "education underpins all social progress. If we can improve the general education level worldwide, global poverty can be dealt with profoundly and a general standard of living can be vastly improved."

In 2013, The Economist reported that Alison generates revenue through a freemium, advertising-supported model while providing its learning materials - mostly vocational education - at no cost to learners.

Feerick said he was motivated by the UN Declaration of Human Rights, Article 26, and suggested it as a model that can be used by governments worldwide to address the growing global skills gap.

In February 2021, Alison was awarded the Civil Solidarity Prize by the European Economic and Social Committee (EESC) for its free course "Coronavirus – What You Need to Know," which was published in February 2020 to inform people about the spread of the virus, its effects, and how to protect themselves.

== Awards ==
Alison received an Honourable Mention award in Information and Communications Technology at the UNESCO King Hamad bin Isa Al Khalifa Prize in Paris in 2010.

In 2012, Feerick received an Arthur Guinness Fund award for Social Entrepreneurship for the work undertaken with organising the Irish diaspora through the Ireland Reaching Out programme he founded in 2009.

== Social and community initiatives ==
=== Ireland Reaching Out (Ireland XO) ===
Feerick founded Ireland Reaching Out, a volunteer-led, community-based national Irish diaspora programme, in 2009 with the stated goal of connecting people of the Irish diaspora to their ancestral roots in Ireland. Feerick and Irish economist David McWilliams pitched the idea to the Irish government in 2010. Ireland Reaching Out welcomed its first returning group in July 2011.

=== University of Limerick ===
Feerick was the founding chairman of the International Advisory Board of the Kemmy Business School at the University of Limerick, and is a Director Emeritus of the University of Limerick Foundation.

=== Irish Support & Advice Service ===
Feerick was appointed chairperson of the Irish Support & Advice Service, Hammersmith, London, in 1995. As chairperson, Feerick founded an outreach programme, funded by the Atlantic Philanthropies and the Mott Foundation, assisting the "forgotten Irish," a term which refers to elderly Irish emigrants to the UK in the 1940s and '50s who subsequently met hard times.

=== Alternative Sentencing ===
Through Alison, Feerick has promoted free learning as an alternative sentencing option within the US court system, where the judge does not wish to impose a custodial sentence. His view is that incarceration should be avoided if at all possible, especially for minor offences, and that free mandatory education should be a part of every court sentence worldwide.

== Personal views ==
Feerick believes that the current traditional education systems are "too slow, too expensive, and they can’t reach everyone," stating that people need a much more accessible education system. He believes that, with the help of technology, it is possible to create a scalable and sustainable platform for free education for everyone.
