= Hasselt University =

Belgian public research university

Coordinates: 50°55′31″N 05°23′27″E

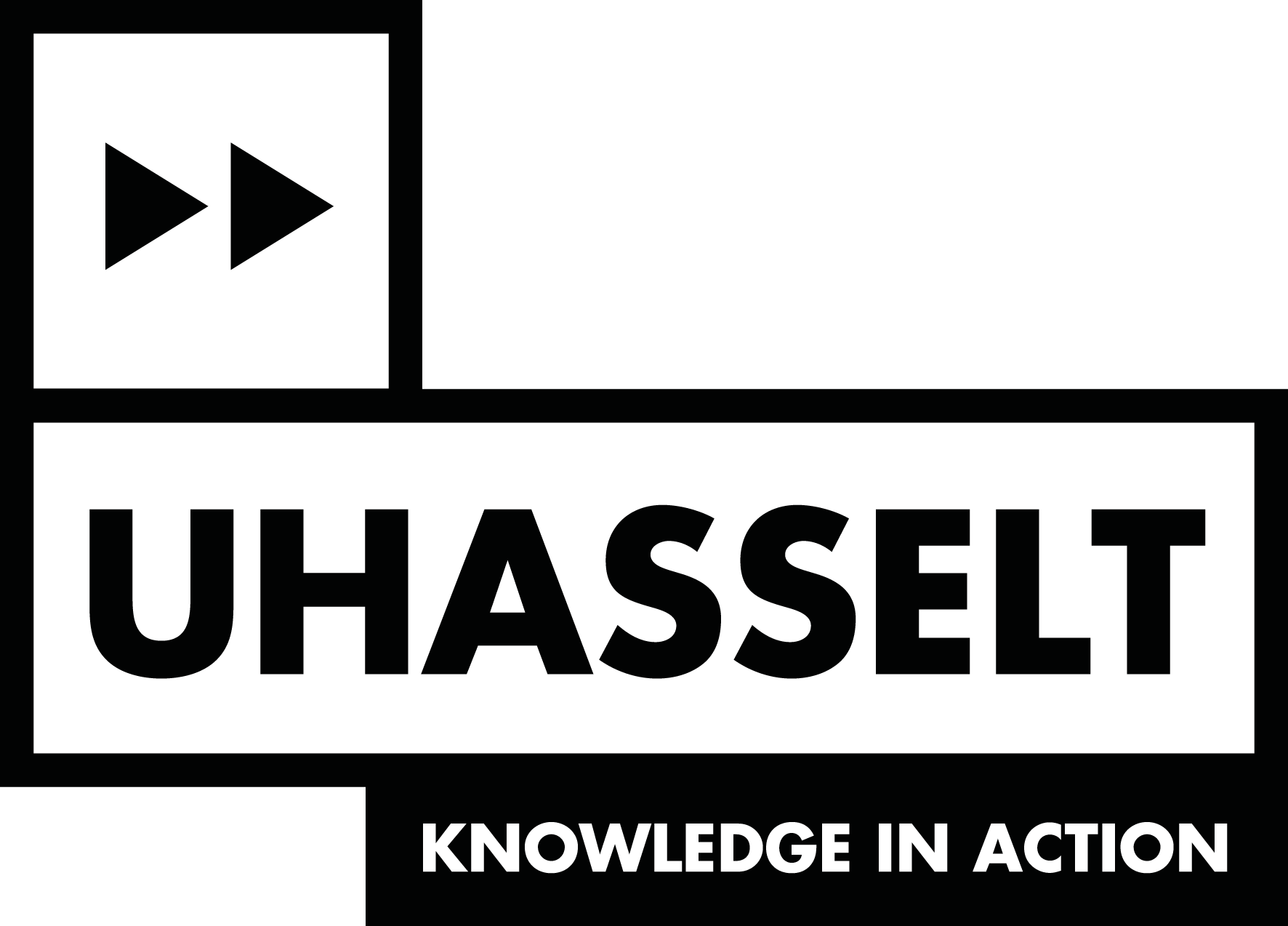
- Motto: 'Knowledge in Action'
- Established: 1971 (UHasselt since 2005)
- Rector: Bernard Vanheusden (2020 – present)
- Administrative staff: 1,871 (October 2026)
- Students: 8,410 (October 2026)
- Location: Hasselt and Diepenbeek, Belgium
- Website: https://www.uhasselt.be/en

Hasselt University (Dutch: Universiteit Hasselt or UHasselt) is a public research university with campuses in Hasselt and Diepenbeek, Belgium. It has more than 8,410 students and 1,870 academic, administrative, and technical staff (2026). The university was officially established in 1971 as the Limburg Universitair Centrum (LUC) and changed its name to Hasselt University in 2005.

UHasselt is ranked in the section 351-375 in the Times Higher Education World University Ranking (2026–2027).

As of October 2020, the Rector of Hasselt University is Prof. Bernard Vanheusden. The Vice-Rector for Education is Prof. Elke Hermans, and the Vice-Rector for Research, Innovation & Internationalisation is Prof. Ken Haenen.

== History ==
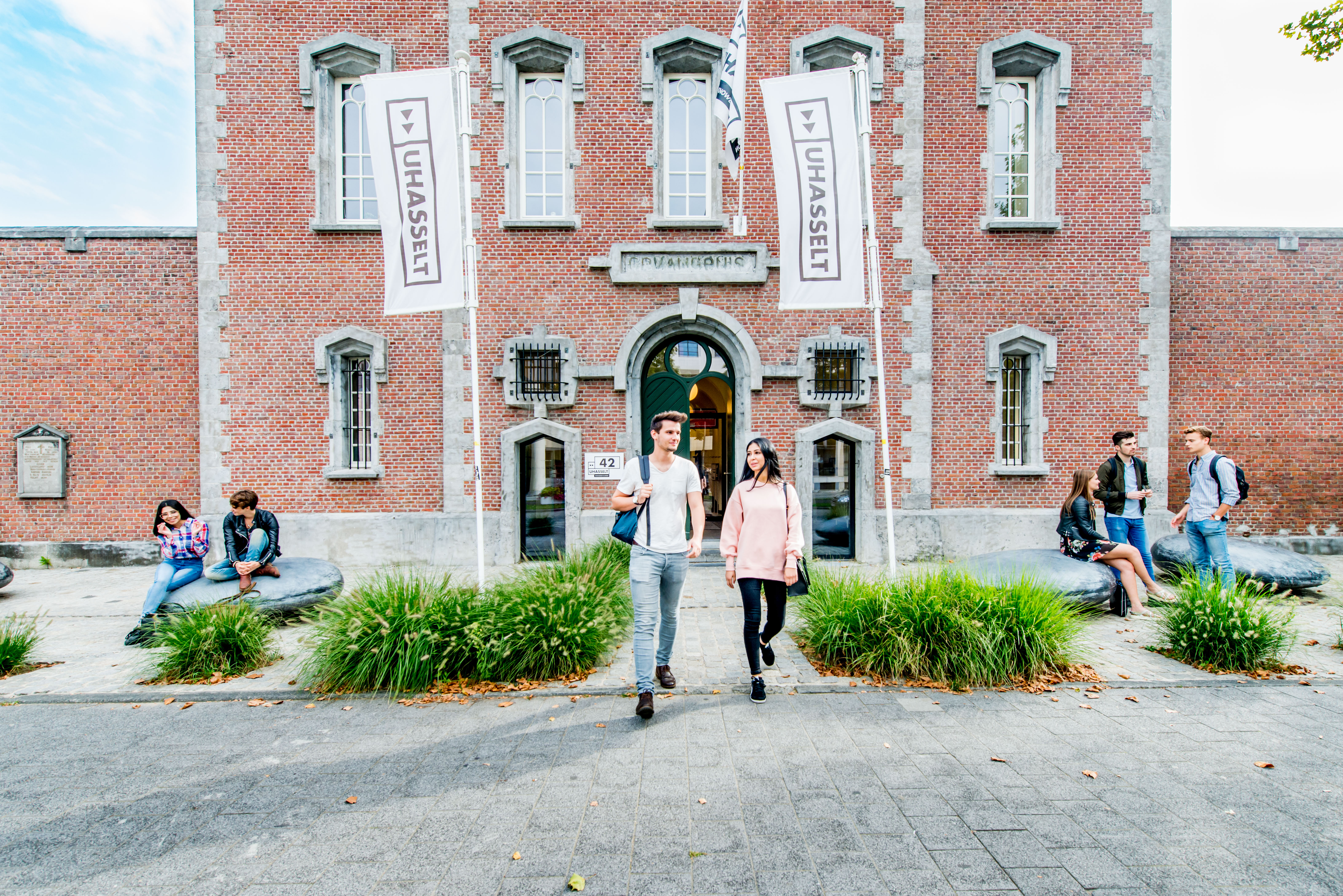
Campus Hasselt, Old Prison.

=== Establishment and start ===
UHasselt/LUC was official established by law in May 1971. In September 1973, the first academic year followed with around 320 students and six (undergraduate) programmes (Mathematics, Physics, Chemistry, Biology, Dentistry and Medicine).

=== Growth ===
In the ensuing decades, Hasselt University went through an enormous transformation. In 1991, the Limburg Business School (EHL) was transformed into the university's third faculty (Faculty of Applied Economics, presently Business Economics). The curriculum was expanded to include Transportation Sciences (2004), Law (2008), Architecture, Interior Architecture, Engineering Technology, Rehabilitation Sciences (2013) and Commercial Sciences (2015). In 2022, five additional programmes were launched: Social Sciences, Materiomics, Nursery and Midwifery, Healthcare Engineering and Engineering Technology: Computer Science.

=== Partnerships ===
In 2001, UHasselt/LUC and Maastricht University founded the Transnational University Limburg (tUL) – an international

University rankings

Global – Overall
- QS World: =597 (2026)

partnership involving two universities in two countries. tUL offers several programmes: Computer Science, Statistics, Biomedical Sciences and Law (a collaboration between tUL and KU Leuven). In 2003, UHasselt/LUC and university colleges PHL and XIOS (presently, PXL University College) formed the Limburg Association of Higher Education, or AUHL. The Association eyes the further development of higher education and scientific research in the Region.

In 2022, Hasselt University joined the EURECA-PRO European University Alliance. The network enables students and staff to study, teach and research in the field of responsible consumption and production. The long-term ambition of UHasselt and its partners in Austria, France, Germany, Greece, Poland, Romania and Spain, is to become the European hub for education and research in sustainability.

=== Name change ===
In 2005, LUC was renamed Hasselt University (or UHasselt).

=== From one to two campuses ===
In 2012, UHasselt opened a second campus in the city centre of Hasselt. It includes the Rectorate, the Law Faculty Building and the Old Prison (‘Oude Gevangenis’). The Old Prison is the university's main seat as well as the place where new students must register. Campus Hasselt also includes the Refugiehuis and Witte Kazerne, located in the Maastrichterstraat.

== Rectors of Hasselt University ==
Rectorial elections at UHasselt take place every four years. All members of the faculty and school boards are eligible to vote (including student representatives). As highest decision-making body, the board of governors officially appoint the new rector. Over the past decades, Hasselt University has had four rectors (including current Rector Vanheusden):

- 1972–1988: Louis Verhaegen
- 1988–2004: Harry Martens
- 2004–2020: Luc De Schepper
- 2020–present: Bernard Vanheusden

== Campuses and main buildings ==
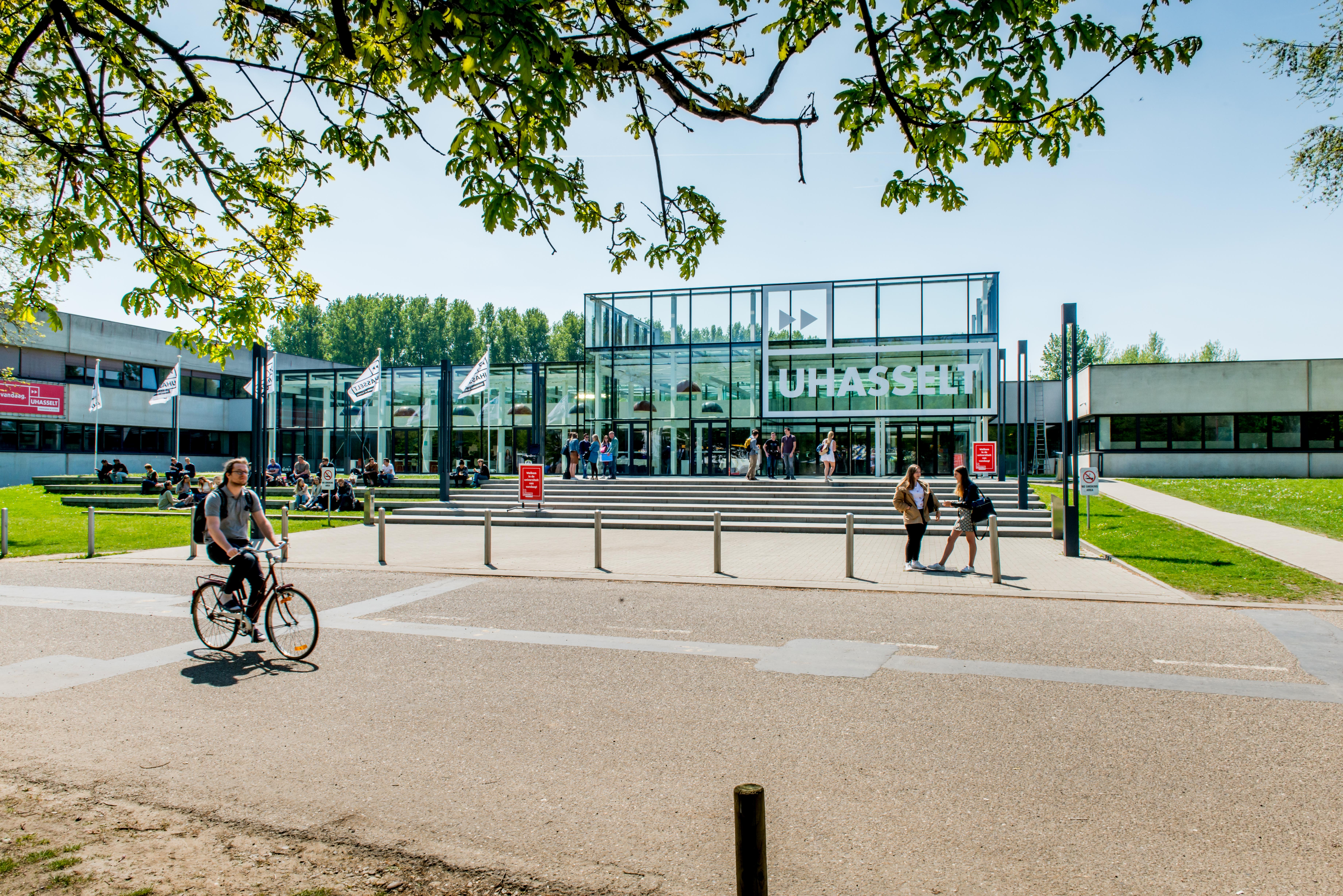
Campus Diepenbeek, Main Building.

=== Campus Diepenbeek ===
Campus Diepenbeek (75 hectares) is located in the 'green belt' near Hasselt. The campus is home to several research institutes, incubators and spin-offs. The student restaurant, University Library, class rooms and auditoriums are located in Main Building D. Other notable campus buildings are the Science Tower (with laboratories for education and research in chemistry and physics) and the Application Centre for Concrete and Construction (ACB²).

=== Campus Hasselt ===
Campus Hasselt (2 hectares) comprises the Rectorate (with the Rector's Office), the Faculty of Law, the School of Transportation Sciences, the international master programme in Interior Architecture (Faculty of Architecture and Arts), and the Old Prison. The almost 200-year-old building has a restaurant, two auditoriums and former prison cells turned into study rooms. The Student Service Centre, where new student enrolment takes place, is also located in the Old Prison Building.

The Offices of the Rector and Administrators are located within walking distance at the sixteenth-century Refugiehuis (formerly a house of refuge for the beguines of the Herkenrode Abbey). The adjacent Witte Kazerne ('White Barracks') houses some central administration offices, next to the above-mentioned School of Transportation Sciences and their Transportation Research Institute.

Hasselt is home to 90,000 inhabitants and is the capital of the Limburg region in Flanders, Belgium. Across the two main campuses (including the students from other universities (of applied sciences), you will find more than 20,000 students, of which approx. 15% international (October 2025).

== Faculties, Schools and research institutes ==
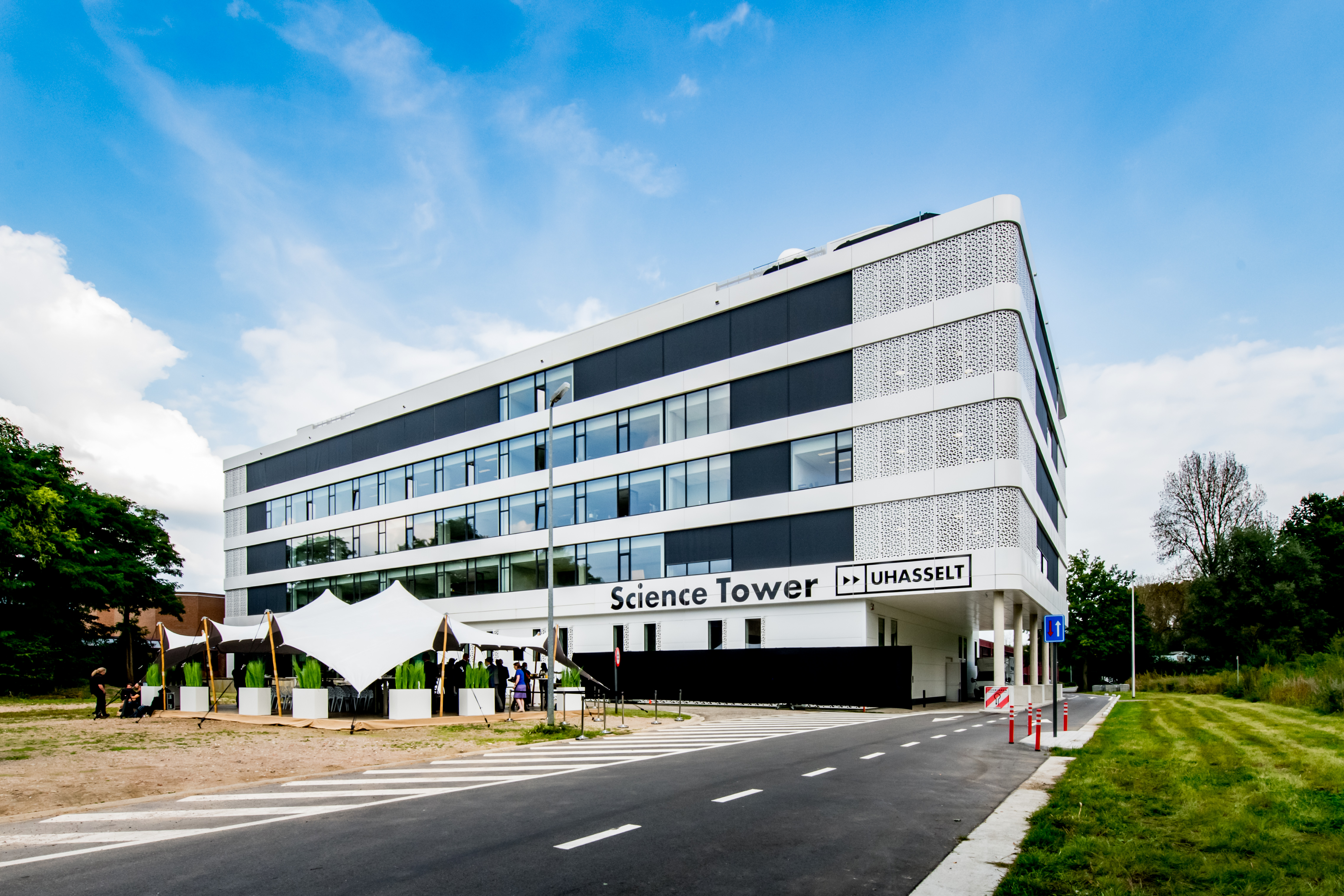
Campus Diepenbeek, Science Tower.

=== Faculties and Schools ===
UHasselt has seven Faculties and three Schools, offering 18 Bachelor's and 35 Master's programmes in total (including 6 English-taught programmes):

- Architecture and Arts
- Business Economics
- Engineering Technology
- Law
- Medicine and Life Sciences
- Rehabilitation Sciences
- Sciences
- School of Transportation Sciences
- School of Educational Studies
- School for Social Sciences

Hasselt University offer several 1-year and 2-year international master's programmes:

- Interior Architecture (adaptive reuse and retail design)
- Energy Engineering Technology (iMEET)
- Management
- Biomedical Sciences
- Transportation Sciences*
- Statistics and Data Science*

Distance-learning and on-campus tracks available*

=== Research institutes and centres ===
UHasselt has four research institutes covering the entire research spectrum (from fundamental research to applied research to valorisation):

- Biomedical Research Institute (BIOMED)
- Centre for Environmental Sciences (CMK)
- Data Science Institute (DSI)
- Institute for Materials Research (IUMAT)

There are also three research centres:

- Limburg Clinical Research Centre (LCRC)
- Transportation Research Institute (IMOB)
- Digital Future Lab (DFL)

== Student life ==
=== Student Council ===
Each academic year, UHasselt students elect a Student Council (StuRa), consisting of fourteen members from the different Faculties and Schools. These representatives serve on several decision-making bodies, including the Board of Governors and the Educational Council.

=== Student Associations ===
UHasselt has a rich student life, with several Student Associations:

- Ambifaarke (student orchestra)
- ASG (Engineering Technology)
- BeMSA Hasselt (Belgian Medical Student Association)
- Biomedica (Biomedical Sciences)
- CCG (Christian Campus Community)
- Commeatus (Transportation Sciences)
- DIP's (Chemistry and Biology)
- ELSA Hasselt (European Law Students' Association Hasselt)
- ESN Hasselt (Erasmus Student Network)
- Filii Lamberti (Mathematics, Physics and Computer Science)
- Hermes (Economics)
- JOSS (Joint Organisation of Statistics Scholars)
- Junior Consulting (association fostering entrepreneurial skills)
- Miezerik (Medicine)
- Themis (Law)
- Rekinea (Rehabilitation Sciences)
- Humanitas (Social Sciences)

== Academic life ==
=== Opening academic year ===
The formal opening of the academic year traditionally takes place in the penultimate week of September. The day starts with the Procession of Professors in the centre of Hasselt and a toast by the Mayor at City Hall. In the afternoon, a ceremony with speeches and music is held.

=== Foundation Day ===
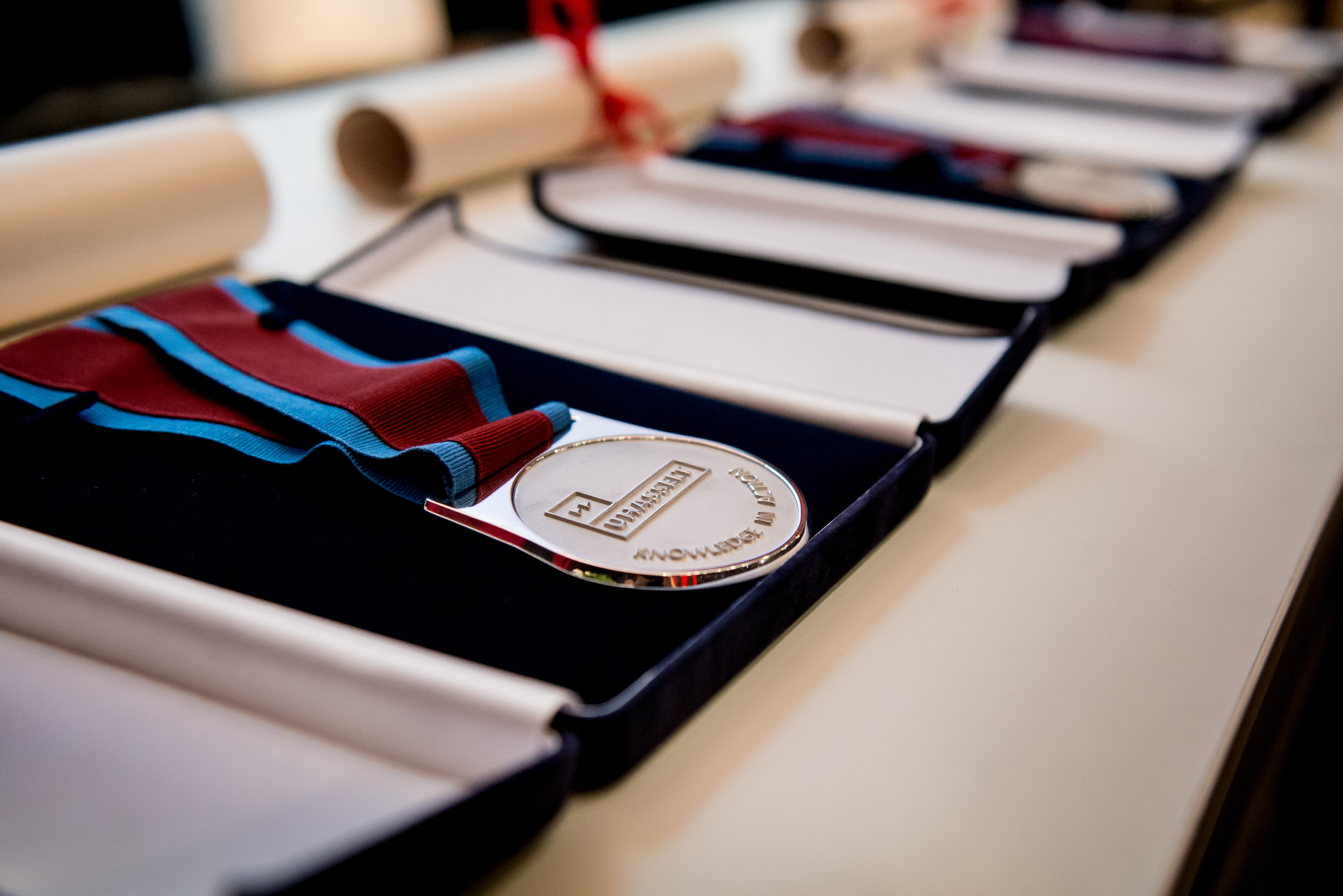
The University Medal.

Hasselt University celebrates its Foundation Day on May 28 (the day when the university was established by law, in 1971). To mark the occasion, honorary doctorate degrees are awarded to individuals for outstanding contributions made to a specific field and/or to society in general. Each honorary doctor receives a diploma and the University Medal. Since 2022, UHasselt also hands out the Foundation Day Honorary Award to an organisation.

== See also ==
- Science and technology in Flanders
- Limburg Science Park
- University Foundation
- Flanders Interuniversity Institute of Biotechnology (VIB)
- Interuniversity Microelectronics Centre (IMEC)
