= Yves Vander Cruysen =

Belgian historian and political activist (1963–2020)

- Born: 9 March 1963; Uccle, Belgium
- Died: 24 November 2020 (aged 57)
- Occupation: Historian

Yves Vander Cruysen (9 March 1963 – 24 November 2020) was a Belgian historian and political activist who served as the senior alderman of Waterloo.

== Biography ==
After studying to become a journalist, Cruysen began his career working for L'Avenir and L'Instant. He later became a spokesman for the Walloon Minister of the Economy and launched several television programmes, including Les balades de Sandrine and L'odyssée de l'Objet. He contributed to the enhancement of the Battle of Waterloo site and served on the executive board of Wallonie-Bruxelles Tourisme.

Cruysen held the position of Alderman of Culture in Waterloo from 1991 until his death and was a Provincial Councillor for Walloon Brabant from 1999 until his death. He founded Wallimage, served as an administrator of the Fondation Folon, and established the Belgo-Festival de Waterloo. He also initiated the Waterloo Historical Film Festival, the Grandes Conférences Historiques de Waterloo, and the Association de promotion du cinéma belge CinéWa. He created the "Waterloo Connection", which brought international attention to the Battle of Waterloo.

Yves Vander Cruysen died of COVID-19 on 24 November 2020, at the age of 57.

== Bibliography ==
- Trois siècles d’Histoire à Waterloo (1987)
- Les Cent Jours de Waterloo (1990)
- Waterloo (1996)
- Récits de guerre en Brabant wallon (2004)
- Un siècle d’histoire en Brabant wallon (2007)
- La Wallonie vue par les grands écrivains (2011)
- Curieuses histoires des aventures belges. Quand nous partions à la conquête du Monde (2011)
- Curieuses histoires des inventeurs belges (2012)
- Pierre Minuit, l’homme qui acheta Manhattan (2013)
- Made in France, non c’est du Belge (2013)
- Waterloo démythifié (2014)
- De Waterloo à Sainte-Hélène (2015)
- Les plus belles traces de Victor Hugo en Belgique (2016)
- Waterloo, 70 000 ans d’histoires (2017)

== Distinctions ==
- Knight of the Order of Leopold
- Knight of the Order of Leopold II
