= Julius Raes =

Belgian Capuchin historian (1884–1961)

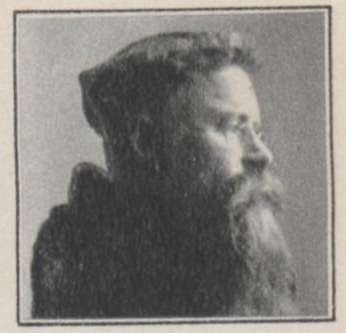
Hildebrand

Julius (Jules) Raes (1884–1961), known in religion as Hildebrand and also under the pen name H. Cappaert, was a Belgian Capuchin historian and archivist.

== Life ==
Raes was born in Hooglede on 3 June 1884, the youngest son of Frans Raes and Marie-Louise Vancoilliue. He attended the Capuchin-run Serafijns College in Bruges and on 28 September 1901 joined the Capuchin Order in Enghien, taking the religious name Hildebrand. He was ordained to the priesthood in Enghien on 13 October 1907 and was sent to study at the Catholic University of Leuven, where he graduated Bachelor of Theology in 1909. He taught Church History and Patristics at the Capuchin seminary in Izegem for two years before being sent to Rome, where he briefly worked at the Collegio Internazionale di San Lorenzo da Brindisi before returning to Belgium.

In 1913, he appointed archivist to the order's Belgian province, and became founding editor of the journal Neerlandia Franciscana. The publication was suspended after the first issue due to the First World War, during which Hildebrand was auxiliary assistant pastor (1914–1915) and then acting pastor (1916–1918) in Rollegem-Kapelle, in 1917–1918 also acting as chaplain to Italian prisoners of war that the Germans put to work on the front in Belgium. He resumed his work as lecturer and editor after the war, and the second issue of Neerlandia Franciscana was published in 1919. In 1921, the title was changed to Franciscana, but in 1924, the order closed down the journal due to publication costs.

In 1927, Hildebrand was invited to join the editorial board of Ons Geestelijk Erf. In 1929, the archive was moved to the Capuchin convent in Antwerp, and Hildebrand, as archivist, moved with it. He was released from other duties to dedicate his time to archival and historical work. After the Second World War, he published his ten-volume history of the Capuchin order in the Low Countries.

Hildebrand retired in 1958, after 45 years as archivist, and moved back to Izegem. He died suddenly in Izegem on 6 June 1961.

== Publications ==
- De Capucijnen te Lier, 1623–1797 (Lier, 1932)
- P. Lucas van Mechelen (Turnhout, 1935)
- Le martyr Georges de Geel et les débuts de la mission du Congo, 1645-1652 (Antwerp, 1940)
- De Kapucijnen in de Nederlanden en het Prinsbisdom Luik (10 vols., 1945–1956)
- Het Vlaamsgezinde dagblad "De Belgische standaard" van de Kapucijn Ildefons Peeters, 1915-1919 (Antwerp, 1957)
