= UNESCO King Hamad Bin Isa Al-Khalifa Prize =

Prize for use of technology to enhance education

The UNESCO King Hamad Bin Isa Al-Khalifa Prize for the Use of Information and Communication Technologies (ICT) in Education is a UNESCO prize which rewards projects and programmes of individuals, institutions, other entities or non-governmental organizations for the creative use of information and communication technologies to enhance learning, teaching and overall education performance.

The prize is funded by the Government of the Kingdom of Bahrain and established in 2005. The prize is conferred annually to two laureates. The Director General of UNESCO selects the two laureates based on the recommendation of an independent international jury. The jury consists of five independent members who are recognized figures in the field of ICT in education selected with equitable geographical distribution and gender. They are appointed by the Director-General for a period of two years.

Every year, the prize has a specific theme and the prize awards USD 25,000 to each laureate as well as a diploma during a ceremony at the UNESCO Headquarters in Paris. Nominations for the prize can be submitted by Governments of the Member States of UNESCO via National Commissions or an international non-governmental organization (NGO) in official partnership with UNESCO; self-nominations are not accepted.

== Prize winners ==
=== 2023 - Digital learning for greening education ===
- “Connecting the dots: Data driven carbon literacy”, the Republic of Korea
- “EducoNetImpact”, Belgium

=== 2022 - The use of public platforms to ensure inclusive access to digital education content ===
- Smart Education of China, Peoples’ Republic of China
- The National Resource Hub, Republic of Ireland

=== 2021 - The use of technology to enable inclusive crisis-resilient learning systems ===
- Central Institute of Educational Technology (CIET), India
- Digital educational programme of Ubongo, Tanzania

=== 2020 - The use of artificial intelligence to enhance the continuity and quality of learning ===
- One College Student Per Village, Open University of China
- ViLLE, University of Turku, Finland

=== 2019 - The use of Artificial Intelligence (AI) to innovate education, teaching and learning ===
- Letrus Writing Skills Program, Letrus, Brazil
- Dytective, Spain

=== 2018 - The use of ICT to ensure education for the most vulnerable groups ===
- ThingLink visual learning technology, ThingLink, Finland
- Can’t Wait to Learn, War Child Holland, the Netherlands

=== 2017 - The Use of ICTs to Increase Access to Quality Education ===
- CLIx (The Connected Learning Initiative), India
- GENIE, Morocco

=== 2016 - The Use of ICTs in Education for Disadvantaged Groups ===
- “Harnessing the Power of ICTs in Higher Education for Refugees” of Kiron Open Higher Education, Germany
- “Online School” of Jaago Foundation, Bangladesh

=== 2015 - Pedagogical Innovation in the Use of ICTs in Teaching and Learning ===
- “National Program of Educational Informatics” (PRONIE) of the Omar Dengo Foundation, Costa Rica
- Open Source Physics @ Singapore project of the Ministry of Education of the Republic of Singapore

=== 2011 - Education Youth for Responsible Global Citizenship ===
- Internet-ABC, Germany
- Dr Yuhyun Park, Co-Founder and CEO of iZ HERO, Republic of Korea

=== 2010 - Digital Literacy: Preparing Adult Learners for Lifelong Learning and Flexible Employment ===
- National Institute of Continuing Adult Education (NIACE), United Kingdom
- Venezuelan Fundación Infocentro, Bolivarian Republic of Venezuela

=== 2009 - Teaching, learning and e-Pedagogy: Teacher Professional Development for Knowledge Societies ===
- Alexei Semenov, Rector of the Moscow Institute of Open Education, Russian Federation
- Jordan Education Initiative, Jordan

=== 2008 - Digital Opportunities for All: Preparing Students for 21st Century Skills ===
- Shanghai TV University, People's Republic of China
- Dr Hoda Baraka, First Deputy to the Minister of Communications and Information Technology, Egypt

=== 2007 - Open Education ===
- Curriki, United States of America
- Claroline Connect, Belgium

=== 2006 - Enhancing Teaching and Learning ===
- The Cyber Home Learning System (CHLS) for primary and secondary students, the Korean Ministry of Education and Human Resources Development (MOEHRD) and the Korea Education and Research Information Service (KERIS), Republic of Korea
- EDegree Programme, Kemi-Tornio University of Applied Sciences, Finland
