= Richard de Guide =

Belgian composer (1909–1962)

Richard de Guide (1 March 1909 – 12 January 1962) was a Belgian composer. He was born in Basècles, Hainaut. He wrote 3 symphonies, choral works, songs for voice and piano, a concerto for the piano and numerous chamber works.

De Guide began his musical education at the Music Academy of Ath. While he wished to become a composer, his family pushed him to become a chemical engineer. He did not give up on music however and also studied music with Jean Absil, Karel Candael and Paul Gilson. Eventually he was hired by the Belgian Radio Broadcasting Institute, but was imprisoned during World War II. After the war was over, he became director of the Music Academy of Woluwe St. Lambert and also worked at the Conservatory of Liège and Mons.
