= Valerius Geerebaert =

Belgian Redemptorist educator, preacher and author

Valerius Hieronymus Geerebaert (1884–1957) was a Belgian Redemptorist educator, preacher and author. Geerebaert was born in Ghent on 19 January 1884. He contributed to numerous journals and reviews in both French and Dutch. He died in Ghent on 26 December 1957.

== Books ==
- De God-Mensch (Leuven, 1925–1939)
