= Jacques Feyerick =

Belgian hurdler

Personal information
- Nationality: Belgian
- Born: 28 December 1874 Ghent
- Died: 13 November 1955 (aged 80) Ghent

Sport
- Sport: hurdling

Achievements and titles
- National finals: Belgian champion 110 m hurdles 1892

Jacques Feyerick (28 December 1874 – 13 November 1955) was a Belgian athlete who specialised in hurdling. He won the Belgian national title in his event.

== Biography ==
=== Athletics ===
Feyerick was born in Ghent. He became the Belgian champion at 110-metres hurdling. He was affiliated with AA Gent.

=== Soccer ===
Feyerick was the president of AA Gent in 1912. He managed to collect the best Ghent soccer players in a mixed team, the Ghent Entente. He was only president for a short time.

=== Gulf ===
After the deaths of his brothers Albert Feyerick in 1919 and Ferdinand in 1920, he was responsible for the golf course of Les Buttes Blanches, the current Royal Latem Golf Club. He made sure that the members of the golf club could acquire the fields.

=== Private life ===
Feyerick worked, together with his brothers, as an entrepreneur, in the textile sector and the sugar trade. He was married to Christine Braun, the daughter of Mayor Emile Braun, and he had two daughters.

== Sources ==
- 100 jaar Belgische atletiek, uitgave KBAB, 1989
- Website 150 jaar KAA Gent
- A century of golf in Sint-Martens-Latem
