= 1943 in Belgium =

- Decades: 1920s; 1930s; 1940s; 1950s; 1960s
- See also: Other events of 1943; List of years in Belgium

This is a page of the events in the year 1943 in Belgium. By 1 January 1943, Belgium had already been occupied by Nazi Germany for more than two-and-a-half years. Many events of 1943 were related to the continuing occupation.

== Incumbents ==
- Monarch: Leopold III (prisoner)
- Prime Minister: Hubert Pierlot (in exile)
- Head of the occupying Military Administration in Belgium and Northern France: Alexander von Falkenhausen
- Head of the administrative staff of the Occupation: Eggert Reeder

== Events ==
- 13 January – Cardinal van Roey issues a pastoral letter condemning terrorism.
- 17 January – Pro-German Collaborationist politician Léon Degrelle declares that Walloons are ethnically Germanic.
- 20 January – Solo air attack on the Gestapo's Brussels headquarters by Belgian fighter pilot Jean de Selys Longchamps, flying from England.
- 27 February – Some 750 Belgian police officers and gendarmes placed in detention by the occupying forces.
- 7 March – Decree obliging students to spend six months as labourers.
- 10 March – Decree confiscating church bells to be melted down for metal.
- 15 March – Cardinal van Roey issues a pastoral letter condemning the seizure of church bells.
- 5 April – Aircraft of the United States Army Air Forces (USAAF) bomb Mortsel, killing over a thousand civilians.
- 19 April – Members of the Resistance briefly stop a deportation train carrying Jewish prisoners to Auschwitz concentration camp.
- 20 April – Resistance attack on the office for conscription of compulsory labour destroys a large part of their files.
- 16 July – Honoré Van Waeyenbergh, Rector of the Catholic University of Leuven, sentenced to eighteen months' imprisonment for refusing to give the occupying forces access to university enrolment records.
- 6 August – Occupying forces confiscate 60% of Belgian textile stock.
- 7 September – Bombing of Brussels by USAAF destroys over a thousand buildings.
- 9 November – Resistance distribute an uncensored counterfeit edition of Le Soir
- 6 December – Occupying forces requisition 129,000 tonnes of agricultural produce.

== Arts and architecture ==
Performances

- 17 March – First performance of Georges Sion's comedy La Matrone d'Ephèse in the Palace of Fine Arts, Brussels.

== Births ==
- 6 March – Noël Devisch, businessman
- 23 March – Marva Mollet, singer
- 30 March – Mireille Bastin, painter (died 2026)
- 5 April – Miet Smet, politician
- 14 April – Norbert De Cuyper, politician
- 25 April – Jean-Jacques Cassiman, geneticist
- 3 June – André Ernotte, film director (died 1999)
- 2 July – Walter Godefroot, cyclist
- 5 July – André Smets, politician (died 2019)
- 27 August – Marcel Neven, politician (died 2026)
- 1 September – Claude De Bruyn, road safety advocate (died 2020)
- 1 October – Raymond Langendries, politician
- 5 October – Josly Piette, politician
- 1 November – Salvatore Adamo, singer
- 25 November – Victor Albert, politician (died 2005)
- 1 December – Danny Huwé, journalist (died 1989)

== Deaths ==
- 27 January – Louis Fonsny, collaborationist newspaper editor.
- 15 April – Paul Colin (born 1895), collaborationist art critic
- 10 May – Arnaud Fraiteur (born 1924), resistance fighter
- 16 August – Jean de Selys Longchamps (born 1912), fighter pilot
- 8 October – Gustave De Smet (born 1877), painter
