= Koen Vanmechelen =

Belgian artist

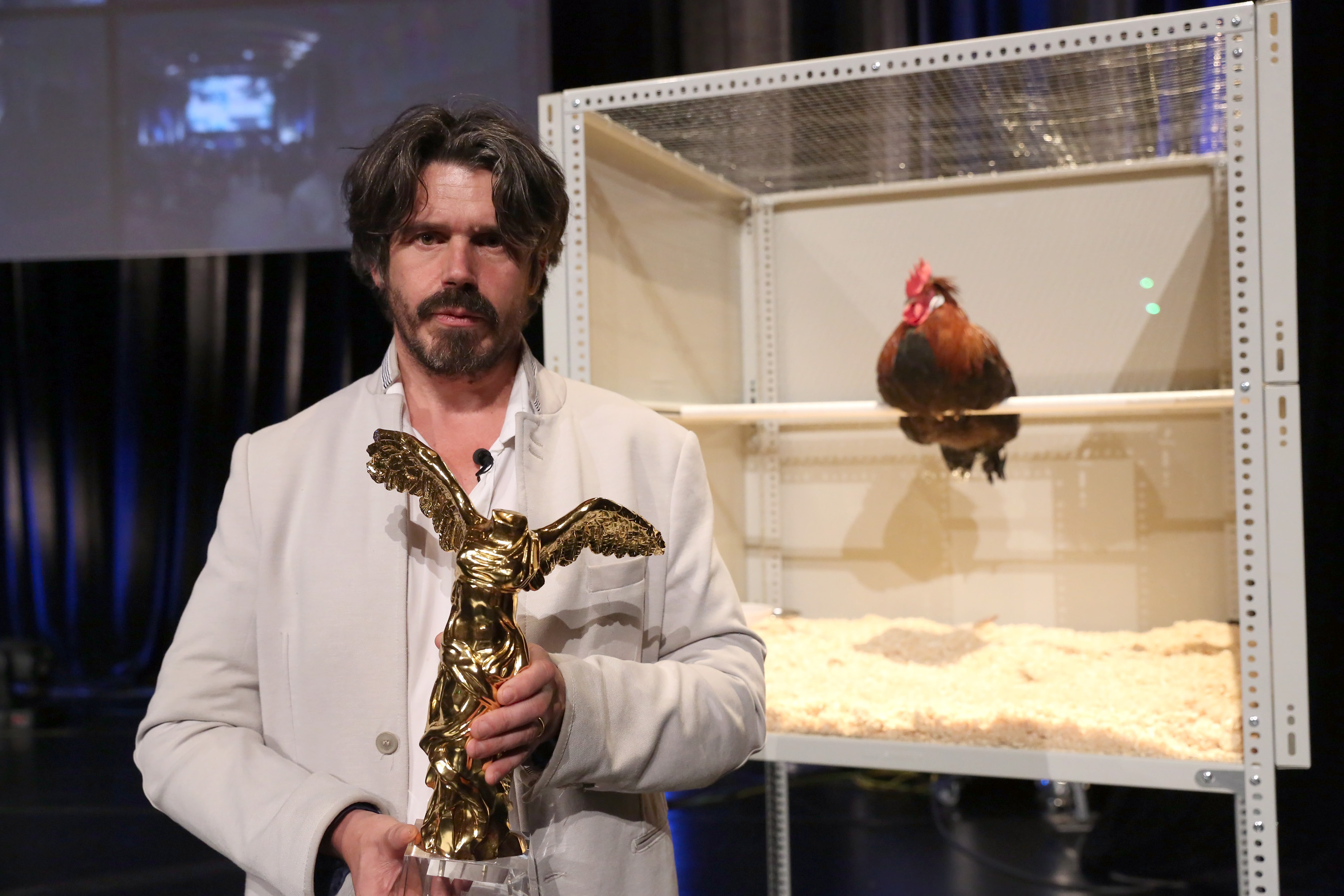
- Koen Vanmechelen with the Golden Nica for The Cosmopolitan Chicken Project at the Prix Ars Electronica 2013
- Born: 25 August 1965 (age 61); Sint-Truiden
- Known for: Multi-disciplinary art
- Notable work: Cosmopolitan Chicken (Research) Project, Walking Egg, Cosmogolem
- Movement: Conceptual art
- Awards: honorary citizen of Sint-Truiden, doctor honoris causa at the University of Hasselt, Golden Nica Hybrid Art, Best Artwork award from ISMB

Koen Vanmechelen (born August 26, 1965 in Sint-Truiden) is a Belgian artist who began his career in the early 1990s. Central to his work is the concept of bio-cultural diversity, which he investigates through the domestic chicken and its ancestral species, the red junglefowl or Gallus gallus.

Vanmechelen began with his Cosmopolitan Chicken Project (CCP), an international undertaking of crossbreeding national chicken species, in search of a Cosmopolitan Chicken. His 20th generation, the Mechelse Wyandotte, was born in September 2016 in Detroit. Vanmechelen has several projects parallel to the CCP: The CosmoGolem, The Walking Egg, MOUTH, COMBAT and The Cosmopolitan Chicken Research Project (CC®P), all of which he manages from his Open University of Diversity, located in the old Gelatin Factory near Hasselt Harbour.

The artist's work is an investigation of and an ode to the beautiful diversity and hybridity of life:

Every organism needs another organism to survive.

Biocultural diversity and the consequent interaction between art and science form the core theme of his oeuvre. Vanmechelen often collaborates with scientists and experts from different disciplines, such as Jean-Jacques Cassiman, Rik Pinxten and Marleen Temmerman. He uses innovative technologies such as 3D-scanning, morphometrics, 3D-printing and interactive 3D visualisation. His works are inherently cross-medial and interdisciplinary. Vanmechelen creates, amongst others, expressive paintings and drawings, photography, video, installation art and wooden sculptures. The common visual theme throughout these various methods of expression are the chicken and the egg. These have, over the years, become important symbols to Vanmechelen, allowing the artist to interconnect scientific, philosophical, and ethical issues, and to frame the subject of debates and lectures.

A new species of flat worm discovered in Venice (It) during the artist solo exhibition Nato a Venezia at the biennial of Venice was in 2013 named Trigonostomum Vanmecheleni in honour of the artist.

== Biography ==
Koen Vanmechelen, who lives in the Belgian town of Meeuwen-Gruitrode, is professionally based in Hasselt. He is a self-taught artist who studied hotel management in Antwerp and worked several years as a cook and pastry chef in Belgian top restaurants. His father is an artist, his mother a fashion designer. Vanmechelen's interest in chickens and birds started at an early age, due to the trips he made with his uncle Louis Gonnissen, a Belgian ornithologist and television personality. At the age of five, he says in an interview, he already had a breeding coop in his bedroom.

Conservators Jan Kenis, Jan Hoet and illustrator Gregie de Maeyer launched him into the world of art in the early nineties. His first works consisted mainly of wooden constructions, assemblages and cages for birds. This aligns him with the Belgian tradition of assemblage artists. In the nineties, Vanmechelen quickly evolved into a conceptual artist and later on a multi-, trans- en interdisciplinary artist. During the late nineties, Vanmechelen launched his Cosmopolitan Chicken Project (CCP), which occupies a unique place in art history. It gave him fast national and international recognition in and outside the art world.

== Foundations ==
=== Cosmopolitan Chicken Project ===
The Cosmopolitan Chicken Project (CCP) is an ongoing trans-disciplinary art project started in the late 1990s which aims to create a hybrid of all races of chicken in the world. At the moment it has reached its eighteenth generation, a crossbreeding between the Mechelse Styrian (the offspring of the sixteenth generation) and the Austrian Sulmtaler. The CCP is a commentary about diversity, complexity and immunity. The breeding of a perfectly “cosmopolitan” chicken, carrying the genetic material of all possible races, is a metaphor for multicultural human society. According to Vanmechelen, humanity will only be able to thrive and stay “healthy” in a situation of maximized diversity, a notion reflected by the results of the repeated crossbreeding of races which had previously only been inbred: the offspring of the CCP have longer lifespans and higher fertility rates than the average domesticated chicken, as well as a more effective immune system, making them less liable to be stricken by disease. This intercultural approach has resulted in a chicken carrying traces of DNA from chicken races all over the world: Belgium, France, the U.S., Britain, the Netherlands, Germany, Mexico, Thailand, Brazil, Turkey, Russia, Egypt, Cuba, Italy, Senegal, China, Slovenia and Austria. The CCP has also spawned a plethora of drawings, paintings, sculptures and installations.

=== Cosmopolitan Chicken Research Project ===
The Cosmopolitan Chicken Research Project (CC®P) is the more scientifically oriented half of the CCP. In collaboration with esteemed Belgian human geneticist Jean-Jacques Cassiman, Vanmechelen researches the genetic make-up of the chicken races participating in the CCP. The database generated by this research has been said to be the most extensive one in Belgium. The results of the research have been presented in the form of virtual representations as well as 3D-printed sculptures. The piece Evolution of a Hybrid represents three chicken chromosomes, two isolated from inbred, domesticated chickens, the third from a crossbreed: “Chromosomes are laid out in circles, connecting at one tip of the chromosome and wrapped in spherical shapes. The longest chromosomes (chromosomes 1 and 2) cross at the top of the sphere. The number of homozygous and heterozygous polymorphisms along the chromosomes are indicated by peaks pointing inwards and outwards, respectively. As a result, inbred chickens have relatively more peaks pointing inwards while crossbred chickens have more peaks pointing outwards.”

=== COMBAT/CMRM ===
COMBAT was a project commemorating the one hundredth anniversary of the start of the First World War. It was an offshoot of parent project Coming World Remember Me (CWRM), a collaboration between Vanmechelen and Jan Moeyaert. The ultimate goal of CWRM was to produce 600,000 small clay statues, one for every soldier killed on Belgian soil during WW1, by the end of 2018, the 100th anniversary of the end of the First World War. The statues were made by the public, aided by international workshops. At the end of the project, they were all part of a land art installation near the Palingbeek in Ypres, former no man’s land. The temporary installation was finalized in April 2018 and covered a surface of several hectares.

== Current projects ==
Wooden Coin

Wooden Coin is a project in collaboration with bpost, in support of SOS Children’s Villages. It consists of oak tree planted in the center of a roundabout near the future location of the OpUnDi headquarters in Genk. Five twigs, each originating from a different species of oak and representing the five world continents, are grafted onto the tree. The roots have been adorned with pieces of 1 eurocent. The project was accompanied by a complementary charitative initiative, encouraging people to donate 1 euro to SOS Children’s Villages. All contributors received a certificate of donation signed by Vanmechelen.

Arena de evolución

Arena de evolución is a Cuban-based project featuring four “arenas”, places of learning and research regarding themes such as biological and cultural immunity, diversity, fertility and ethics. Each arena is co-chaired by Vanmechelen himself and an expert in the field concerned. The findings generated by the research conducted in the arenas will be collected in the LOCK (Library Of Collected Knowledge) and presented at the Havana Biennial. The project was kicked off with a symposium at the Open University of Diversity in Hasselt during which the core themes of the project were presented to the public by the scientific authorities involved. In September of this year, an international and interdisciplinary team of thinkers traveled to Arusha, Tanzania to set up the second arena and to be immersed in the culture of the native Maasai. The views and opinions of the Maasai regarding nature, evolution, and the increasing influence of modernity on the natural world and environment form an integral part of the project.

== Bibliography (selection) ==
- The Accident IV, Chronicle of The Cosmopolitan Chicken, Hasselt, 2013
- COMBAT, Cosmopolitan Chicken bvba - Koen Vanmechelen, Guy Pieters Editions and Lancommandery Alden Biesen, Bilzen, 2012
- The Accident III, Chronicles of The Cosmopolitan Chicken, Guangzhou 2011
- The Accident II, Chronicles of The Cosmopolitan Chicken, Hasselt 2010
- The Chicken's Appeal, Museum Het Valkhof, Nijmegen 2008
- The Accident, Het Glazen Huis, Lommel 2007
- The Accident, Chronicles of The Cosmopolitan Chicken, Verbeke Foundation, Kemzeke 2007
- The Walking Egg/Born, P. Dupont, Fertility Hospital, Genk 2005
- The Cosmopolitan Chicken, Virtual Mechelse Fighter, Deweert Art Gallery, Otegem 2005
- Cosmopolitan Chicken Project, Barbara Simons & Wouter Keirse, Ludion
- Gent-Amsterdam, De Brakke Grond, Amsterdam 2003
- The Cosmopolitan Chicken, Sex & Mortality, Deweer Art Gallery, Otegem, 2003
- The Cosmopolitan Chicken, Between Natural breeding and genetic engineering, Deweer Art Gallery, Otegem 2001

== Expositions ==
Solo-exhibitions (selection)

- 2014
  - Beyond Reality, Cosmopolitan Gallery, Genk (BE)
  - In Captivity, Genius Loci, Biennial of Venice (IT)
  - Never Green, Rurart art centre, Rouillé (Poitiers) (FR)
  - Darwin's Dream, St. Pancras Church, London (UK)
- 2013
  - Leaving Paradise, CONNERSMITH., Washington (US)
  - Handmade - C.C.P., LOMAK, Tessenderlo (BE)
  - The Mechelse Styrian - 17th generation - C.C.P., Gallerija Kapelica, Ljubljana (SI)
  - Inception - C.C.P., Wasserman Projects, Detroit (US)
- 2012
  - COMBAT, Landcommandery Alden Biesen, Bilzen (BE) and Art gallery De Mijlpaal, Heusden-Zolder (BE)
  - Hotel de Inmigrantes 2 – Cosmopolitan Stranger (Collateral Event Manifesta 9), Open University of Diversity, Hasselt (BE)
- 2011
  - Nato a Venezia, Collateral Event of 54th Biennial of Venice, Venice (IT)
  - Breaking the Cage, IKOB, Museum of Contemporary art Eupen, Eupen (BE)
  - Cosmopolitan Chicken Project, Art Labor, Shanghai (CN)
  - C.C.P. – In-vetro, Mediaruimte, Brussels (BE)
  - King’s Crown – C.C.P., Absolute Art Gallery, Knokke (BE)
- 2010
  - 14th Generation: Mechelse Silky, Himalayas Center, Pudong Shanghai (CN)
  - Cosmopolitan Chicken – Diversity, Espace Européen pour la Sculpture, Parc Tournay-Solvay, Brussels (BE)
- 2009
  - Cosmopolitan Chicken Project, Conner Contemporary Art, Washington DC (US)
  - Cosmopolitan Chicken Project, Muziekgebouw aan ‘t IJ, Amsterdam (NL)
  - Cosmopolitan Chicken Project - Orloff, Deweer Art Gallery, Otegem (BE)
  - Unicorn, 53rd Venice Biennale, 2009, Venice (IT)
  - Connection, St. Lucas Gallery, Brussels (BE)
- 2008
  - Breaking the Cage – The art of Koen Vanmechelen, Victoria and Albert Museum, Arts & Business, curator Mike Phillips, London (GB)
  - The Chicken’s Appeal, Museum Valkenhof, curator Frank Van der Schoor, Nijmegen (NL)
  - CCP Ten Generations, Galerie k4, München (DE)
- 2007
  - CCP Ten Generations, Deweer Art Gallery, Otegem (BE)
  - CCP Au Salon, Marijke Schreurs Gallery, Brussels (BE)
  - The Accident, Cornice, Venice Project, Venice (IT)
- 2006
  - The Accident, curator Agnes Husslein, Palm Court, Miami Beach (US)
- 2005
  - Cosmopolitan Chicken Project - Virtual Mechelse Fighters, Deweer Art Gallery, Otegem (BE)
  - Red Jungle Fowl - Genus XY, CRAC, Hilde Teerlinck, Altkirch (FR)
- 2004
  - Red Jungle Fowl - Genus XY, Z33, curator Jan Boelen, Hasselt (BE)
  - Cosmopolitan Chicken Project, Bourbourg (FR)
  - Mechelse Dresdner, Galerie k4, München (DE)
- 2003
  - Cosmopolitan Chicken Project, Musée Départemental de l’ Abbaye de St. Riquier (FR)
  - Cosmopolitan Chicken Project – Desire, De Brakke Grond, Amsterdam (NL)
  - Cosmopolitan Chicken Project – Mechelse Owlbeard, GEM Den Haag / KunstRAI, curator Wim Van Krimpen, Amsterdam (NL)
  - Cosmopolitan Chicken Project - Second Generation: Mechelese Bresse - Sex & Mortality, Deweer Art Gallery, Otegem (BE)
  - Visible / Invisible, Galerie Tapper, Malmö (SE)
- 2002
  - Artificial Cross-breeding, Berengo Fine Arts, Miami Art Fair (US)
  - Who’s Calling, Berengo Fine Arts, Mi Art, Milaan (IT)
  - Smak, smak, The Mechelse Bresse, S.M.A.K., curator Jan Hoet Junior, Ghent (BE)
- 2001
  - The Cosmopolitan Chicken, Deweer Art Gallery, Otegem (BE)
- 2000
  - Performance Blood & Colours, Filmfestival, Venice (IT)

Group exhibitions (selection)

- 2013
  - Tabula Rasa - C.C.P., Belgian Embassy (curated by Z33), The Hague (NL)
  - Protected Paradise, Guy Pieters Gallery, Saint Paul de Vence (FR)
  - Symbiosis - C.C.P., Museum de Mindere, Sint-Truiden (BE)
  - Grale - C.C.P., Kortrijk Vlaandert, Kortrijk (BE)
  - Cosmopolitan Fossil, The Eggcord and In Transit - C.C.P., Kunstenfestival Watou (BE)
  - De Wachtkamer, Schatten van VLIEG, Kruidtuin Leuven (BE)
  - Spawn - C.C.P., Murano >< Merano, Glasstress, MERANO ARTE (IT)
  - Evolution of a Hybrid, Pavilion 0, Palazzo Donà, Biennial of Venice (IT)
  - Under my Skin and Patience - C.C.P., White light/White Heat, Glasstress, Biennial of Venice (IT)
  - Inzicht and Coming World - C.C.P., Artzuid, Amsterdam (NL)
  - (Re)source, Modified Spaces, Beelden op de Berg, Wageningen (NL)
  - Re-Cycling Birth, O-Parade, Genk (BE)
  - The exposition Vrouwenkuren, Frantic – C.C.P., IPSOC and Dr. Ghislain, Kortrijk (BE)
  - Studio Vera Vermeersch, Tabula Rasa, CC Haselt, Hasselt (BE)
  - Cultural Freedom in Europe, Pedigree - C.C.P. and Hybridity in Art & Science – C.C.P., Goethe-institute, Walloon Parliament, Brussels (BE)
  - Hybridity in Art and Science - C.C.P. and Symbiosis - C.C.P., Lieux Communs, Namur (BE)
  - The Walking Egg, Transformation, Garage Rotterdam, Rotterdam (NL)
- 2012
  - Hybridity in art and science – C.C.P., dOCUMENTA 13 (‘The Worldly House’), Kassel (DE)
  - Instead of sleeping, Glasstress Beirut, Beirut Exhibition Center, Beirut (LBN)
  - Hotel de Inmigrantes – Cosmopolitan Stranger, Open University of Diversity, Hasselt (Collateral event Manifesta 9) (BE)
  - In Transit – C.C.P., ManifestAanwezig, Kasteel d’Aspremont-Lynden, Oud-Rekem (Collateral Event Manifesta 9) (BE)
  - Without Time Frame, Parallel Worlds, CIAP, Hasselt (Collateral Event Manifesta 9) (BE)
  - Under Pressure – C.C.P., Leaving for a Living, ArtAndAdvice, Hasselt (Collateral Event Manifesta 9) (BE)
  - Coming World – C.C.P., Kunstenfestival Watou, Watou (BE)
  - Conservation – C.C.P., De Etende Mens, Designhuis Eindhoven, Eindhoven (NL)
  - Inzicht – C.C.P., KANAL – Ondernemen is een kunst, Danis, Izegem (BE)
  - Communicating Vessels – C.C.P., KANAL – Ondernemen is een kunst, Vanden Avenne, Ooigem (BE)
  - Vesta – C.C.P., Lieux-Communs, Namen (BE)
  - Disabled – C.C.P., SCOPE NY, New York (US)
  - Entwined - C.C.P., Breaking the Mold, Glasstress, MADmuseum, New York (US)
  - De Nieuwe Gouden Eeuw, Abbey of Sint-Bernardus, Bornem (BE)
- 2011
  - Modified Spaces – C.C.P., 4th triennial of Guangzhou, Guangdong Museum of Art (CN)
  - Genetic Freedom – C.C.P., Scenarios about Europe, GFZK, Leipzig (DE)
  - Glasstress, Venice Projects, Venice (IT), Oslo (NO)
  - Sjamanism – C.C.P., Andermans Veren, Art Gallery De Mijlpaal, Heusden-Zolder (BE)
- 2010
  - Mediations Biënnale Beyond Mediations, Tower of Babel, Poznań (PL)
  - Schone Schijn, Beeldende kunstmanifestatie, Heemskerk (NL)
  - InGewikkeld, Art Gallery De Mijlpaal, Clarissenklooster, Hasselt (BE)
  - The Cosmopolitan Chicken Project - Feed the world, Wijheizijweihij, Vredeseilanden, Eliksem (BE)
  - The Cosmopolitan Chicken Project - Innovations and adaptation, Dak’Art Biënnale, Dakar (SN)
  - The Cosmopolitan Chicken – Frozen Culture Balance, Mediations, National Museum Warsaw, Warschau (PL)
  - Art Amsterdam, Amsterdam (NL)
  - Art Paris, Paris (FR)
  - Arco Madrid, Madrid (ES)
  - The Armory Show, New York (US)
  - Parallellepipeda, M - Museum Leuven (BE)
  - Figure it out?!, China China, Ceramics, Art Gallery De Mijlpaal, Heusden-Zolder (BE)
  - FADA Los Angeles Art Show 2010, Los Angeles (US)
  - Ant)arcticmatters, Frozen Culture Balance, Verbeke Foundation, Kemzeke (BE)
- 2009
  - Lineart art fair 2009, Blikvanger: Unicorn, Showcase; Figure it out, Ceramics; China China, Flanders Expo, Ghent (BE)
  - PULSE Miami 2009, The Cosmopolitan Chicken, Pulse (US)Contemporary Art Fair, The Ice Palace, Miami (US)
  - Becoming Intense, Becoming Animal, Becoming ..., Völkerkundemuseum von Portheim-Stiftung, Heidelberg (DE)
  - In Bed Together, Breaking the Cage, Royal/T, curator Jane Glassman, Culver City (US)
  - The Toronto International Art Fair 2009, Toronto (CA)
  - Against Exclusions, The Cosmopolitan Chicken Project, Mechelse Orloff, 3rd Moscow Biennale of Contemporary Art, curator
  - Jean-Hubert Martin, Moskou (RU)
  - Boer zoekt stijl, Designhuis, Eindhoven (NL)
  - Glasstress, 53ste Biennial of Venice, Venice (IT)
  - VOLTA Basel 2009, Bazel (CH)
  - CIGE 2009, China International Gallery Exposition, Beijing (CN)
  - 101 Tokyo Contemporary Art Fair 2009, Tokyo (JP)
  - Superstories, 2de Triënnale Hasselt, curator Koos Flinterman, Hasselt (BE)
- 2008
  - Kort is de tijd en onherroepelijk, Landgoed Groot Vijverburg, Tytsjerk (NL)
  - Dat de verte nabijer dan ooit was, Salvator Globe, curator Giacinto di Pietrantonio, St. Bavokerk, Watou (BE)
  - Genesis: CCP 10 Generation, Zentrum Paul Klee, curator Fabienne Eggelhöfer, Bern (CH)
  - The Salvator Globe, Art Brussels, Brussels (BE)
  - The Cathedral – Ectoplasma – CCP, Congress Centre, Davos (CH)
  - Doing it my way, MKM Museum Küppersmühle für Moderne Kunst, curator Lorenzo Benedetti, Duisburg (DE)
  - Zerbrechliche Schönheit, The Accident, museum Kunst Palest, curator Thijs Visser, Düsseldorf (DE)
  - Ad Absurdum, Mechelse Bresse, MARTA, curator Jan Hoet, Herford (DE)
  - Die Hände der Kunst, Koen Vanmechelen x Mechelse Koekoek, MARTA, curator Jan Hoet, Herford (DE)
  - Ephermeral Fringes, CCP Mechelse Cubalaya, curator Filip Luyckx, Art Brussels, Brussels (BE)
  - The Cosmopolitan Chicken: 10 Generations, Mediations Biënnale, curators Yu Yeon Kim, Lorand Heg Yi, Gu Zhenqing, Poznań (PL)
  - Betrekkelijk rustig, Lab, Kasteel Rekem, curator Annemie Van Laethem, Rekem (BE)
  - Somewhere in the Middle of Nowhere, CCP, curator Arno Vroonen, München (DE)
- 2007
  - Troubleyn / Laboratorium, Ab Ovo, Antwerp (BE)
  - Genesis - The Cosmopolitan Chicken, Centraal Museum Utrecht, curator Emilie Gomart, Utrecht (NL)
  - Totemisimi, Medusa, National Gallery of London, London (GB)
  - De Kunstkas, Bio, Verbeke Foundation, Kemzeke (BE)
  - Some make – Some take, Art Köln, Keulen (DE)
- 2006
  - Facing 1200° - Glass from the Berengo Collection, Museum Moderner Kunst Kärnten, Klagenfurt (AT)
  - DOTS, curator Stef Vanbellingen, Sint-Niklaas (BE)
  - Handle with care, Pushkin Museum, Moskou (RU)
  - Field Work met Hans Op de Beeck en Ricardo Brey, curator Roel Arkesteijn, Kunstvereniging Diepenheim (NL)
- 2005
  - LAT, Oda-Park, curator Marijke Cieraad, Venray (NL)
  - Super!, curator Edith Doove, Hasselt (BE)
  - Slow Art - Neue Akzente aus Flandern und den Niederlanden, Museum Kunst Palast, curator Thijs Visser, Düsseldorf (DE)
  - Two Asias, Two Europes, Duolun Museum of Modern Art, curator Gu Zhenqing, Shanghai (CN)
- 2004
  - Cultivando la Naturaleza, Fundacion César Manrique, curator Bianca Visser, Lanzarote (ES)
  - ECLIPS / 25th Birthday Deweer Art Gallery, curator Jo Coucke, Transfo Zwevegem (BE)
- 2003
  - Le Coq, Musée Départementale de l’Abbeye de Saint-Riquier, Picardie (FR)
  - Beaufort 2003, curator Willy Van den Bussche, Blankenberge (BE)
  - Cinecittà, Berengo Fine Arts, Filmfestival, Venice (IT)
  - The Walking Egg, Shinchu Museum, Taipei (TW)
- 2002
  - 3 FEB 02, Museum Dhondt-Dhaenens, curator Edith Doove, Deurle (BE)
  - Attitude, Château du Pauly (FR)
  - Cinecittà, Berengo Fine Arts Filmfestival, Venice (IT)
- 2001
  - Secret Gardens, curator Annemie Van Laethem, Rekem (BE)
  - www.murano.be, Venetiaanse Gaanderijen, Oostende (BE)
  - Wir sind die ander(en), curator Jan Hoet, Herford (DE)
- 2000
  - The Walking Egg, Arco 2000, Madrid (ES)
  - Storm Centers, curator Jan Hoet, Watou (BE)
  - A Shot in the Head, curator Jill Silverman, Lisson Gallery, London (GB)

== Permanent works (selection) ==
- Infinity - C.C.P., Sint-Trudo Hospital, 2013, Sint-Truiden (BE)
- The Cosmopolitan Chicken – Celestial body, VOKA Kamer van Koophandel Limburg, 2010, Hasselt (BE)
- The Cosmopolitan Chicken – Time Temperature, BioVille, Campus UHasselt, Biomedical Research Institute (BIOMED), 2010, Diepenbeek (BE)
- High-Breed, The European Academy of Gynaecological Surgery, 2009, Leuven (BE)
- Troubleyn / Laboratorium, Ab Ovo, 2007, Antwerp (BE)
- The Walking Egg – Born, Ziekenhuis Oost-Limburg, 2005, Genk (BE)

== Lectures/debates (selection) ==
- 2013
  - The Cosmopolitan Chicken Project, ISA (Instituto Superior de Arte), Havana (CU)
  - The Cosmopolitan Chicken Project, CONNERSMITH, Washington (US)
  - The Cosmopolitan Chicken Project, Galerija Kapelica, Ljubljana (SI)
  - When happiness happens, BOZAR (in cooperation with United Nations), Brussels (BE)
  - The Cosmopolitan Chicken Project, University of Kortrijk, Kortrijk (BE)
  - The Cosmopolitan Chicken Project, Community Center De Markthallen, Herk-De-Stad (BE)
  - The Cosmogolem Foundation, JOC De Kouter, Poperinge (BE)
  - The Cosmopolitan Chicken Project, CIMIC, University of Mechelen, Mechelen (BE)
  - The Cosmopolitan Chicken Project, Het Paleis, Antwerp (BE)
  - The Cosmopolitan Chicken Project, EuropeN, European Economic and Social Committee, Brussels (BE)
  - The Cosmopolitan Chicken Project, Cranbrook University, Detroit (US)
  - The Cosmopolitan Chicken Project, Wayne State University, School of Medicine, Detroit(US)
  - The Cosmopolitan Chicken Project, Museum of Contemporary Art, Detroit (US)
  - The Cosmopolitan Chicken Project, Day for Cultural Education by the Flemish Government, Ghent (BE)
- 2012
  - The Cosmopolitan Chicken Project, Tori Oso (SR)
  - The Cosmopolitan Chicken Project, COMBAT Alden Biesen, Bilzen (BE)
  - The Open University of Diversity, Z33, Hasselt (BE)
  - The Open University of Diversity, TEDxYouth Flanders, Antwerp (BE)
  - The Open University of Diversity, Nanjing Agricultural University, Nanjing (CN)
  - This is not a Chicken, World Appreciative Inquiry Conference, Ghent (BE)
  - The Cosmopolitan Chicken Project, Genetic Freedom, Europe (to the power of N), Berlin (DE)
  - The Cosmopolitan Chicken Project, Bioethics Congress, Rotterdam (NL)
  - The Walking egg, Unite for Sight Global Health & Innovation, Yale University (US)
  - Artist talk met Marcel Pinas, VUB university, Brussels (BE)
- 2011
  - This is not a chicken, Galerie Für Zeit Genössische Kunst, Leipzig (DE)
  - Modified Spaces –C.C.P., with Peter Noever, Guanzhou Museum of Art, Guangzhou (CN)
  - In-Vetro – C.C.P., Symposium Transparent vision – the art and science of glass Kijkduin Biënnale (NL)
  - The Open University of Diversity, Creativity World Forum, Hasselt (BE)
  - The Chicken’s Appeal, Pecha kucha, Brussels (BE)
- 2010
  - The Chicken’s Appeal, TedxFlanders, Antwerp (BE)
  - The Cosmopolitan Chicken Project, European Conference On Computational Biology, Ghent (BE)
  - The Cosmopolitan Chicken Project, Belgian pavilion World Expo, Shanghai (CN)
  - Arts meets Science, Doctor Honoris Causa, Faculty of Medicine UHasselt, Hasselt (BE)
  - The Accident, Debate with Professor J.-J. Cassiman, Dr. Mike Philips, Dr. Luc Vrielinck and Peter Adriaenssens, moderator:
  - Indra Dewitte, Museum M, Leuven (BE)
  - The Cosmopolitan Chicken Project, PULSE New York (US)
- 2009
  - The Chicken’s Appeal, 3rd Moscow Biennial of Contemporary Art, 2009, Moskou (RU)
  - The Cosmopolitan Chicken Project, 53e Biennial di Venezia, Venice (IT)
  - The Cosmopolitan Chicken Project – Culture and Nature Balance Climat ChangeCongress, 2009, Kopenhagen (DK)
- 2008
  - The Cosmopolitan Chicken, Debate, World Economic Forum, Davos (CH)
  - Day of Hope, Cosmogolem, Jeanne Devos Fonds, Mumbai (IN)
  - The Cosmopolitan Chicken Project, Victoria and Albert Museum, London (UK)
  - The Cosmopolitan Chicken Project, Creativity World Forum, Lotto Arena, Antwerp (BE)
- 2007
  - The Walking Egg, Expert meeting Fertility in Developing Countries, Arusha (TA)
- 2005
  - CosmoGolem, Child abuse: Neglecting the Facts, Leuven (BE)
- 2004
  - CosmoGolem en Cosmopolitan Chicken Project, The Jacobs Foundation, Zurich (CH)
- 2002
  - The Cosmopolitan Chicken, Natural History Museum, London (GB)

== Publications (selection) ==
- Facts, Views & Vision, The Low Countries Journal of Obstetrics, Gynaecology and Reproductive Health. A scientific Journal of the Flemish Society of Obstetrics & Gynaecology, June 2009.
- IVF in developing countries: an artist's view, Human Reproduction, An Oxford Journal, published by Oxford University Press, July 2008. Eshre Special Task Force on Developing Countries and Infertility.

== Artistic-scientific projects ==
- “CC®P”, The Cosmopolitan Chicken Research Project; artistic, genetic project with Professor Jean-Jacques Cassiman with as aim to research the genetics of the chickens.
- “The Walking Egg”, Art meets science, with fertilityspecialist Willem Ombelet and a team of scientists, journalists and ‘thinkers’. Publishes a magazine every four years ‘The Walking Egg’ and project ‘Born’ in the hospital ZOL, Genk (Belgium).
- “Frozen Culture”; freezing of sperm of the cosmopolitan chicken with cooperation of Ivo Lambrichts (UHasselt), Dr. Luc Vrielinck and Jan Rutten.
- “The Golden Spur”, chirurgical operation on rooster without spur where on the bone a new golden spur was attached, with dr Luc Vrielinck.
- “Lambo”, contraction of ‘Lama, ‘Ovambo’ and ‘Labo’, a project that is looking for a new way of crossbreeding.
