= 1948 in Belgium =

- Decades: 1920s; 1930s; 1940s; 1950s; 1960s
- See also: Other events of 1948; List of years in Belgium

The following events happened during 1948 in the Kingdom of Belgium.

== Incumbents ==
- Monarch – Leopold III
- Regent: Prince Charles
- Prime Minister – Paul-Henri Spaak

== Events ==
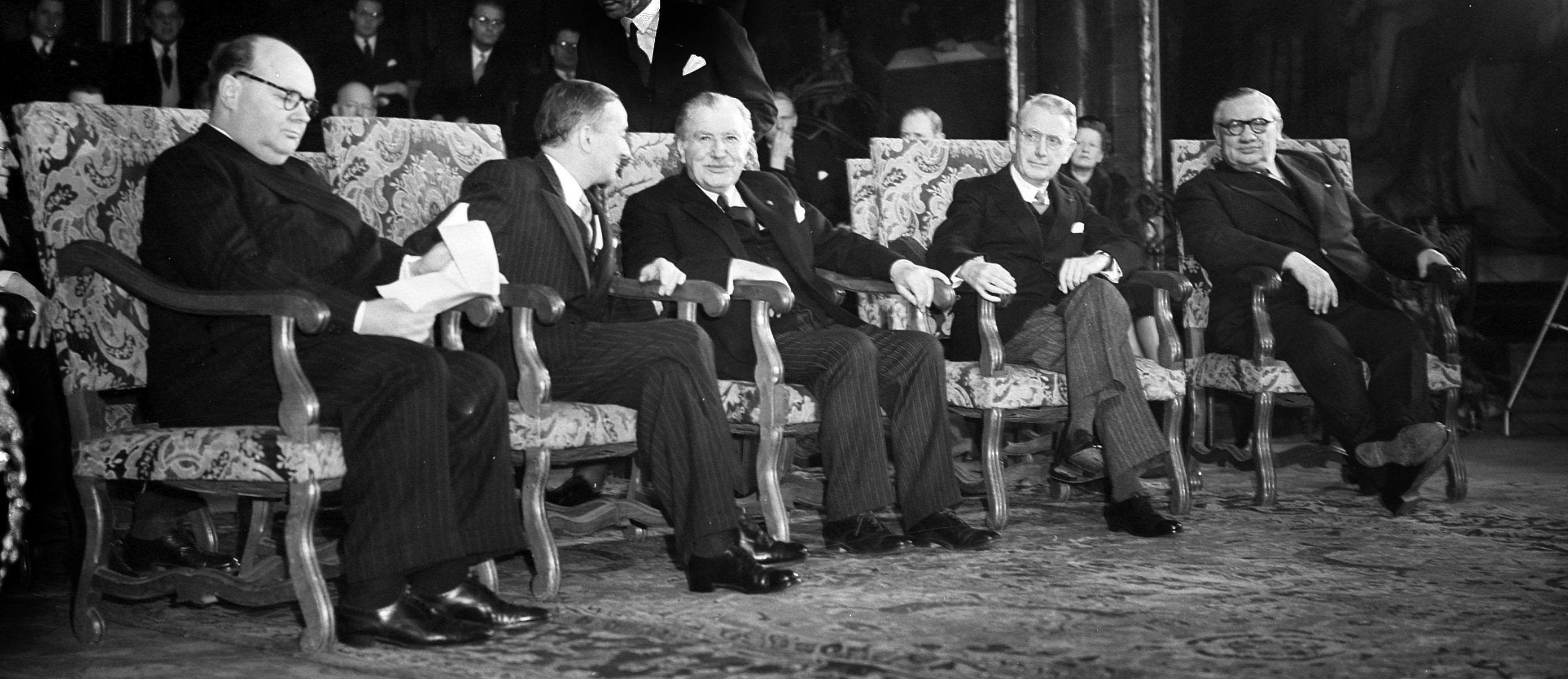
Signatories of the Treaty of Brussels (1948)

- 1 January – Benelux Customs Convention comes into force.
- 17 March – Belgium, France, Luxembourg, the Netherlands, and the United Kingdom sign the Treaty of Brussels, establishing the Brussels Pact for economic, social and cultural collaboration and collective self-defence.
- 27 March – Law fully enfranchising women as voters promulgated
- 29 May – Alfred De Taeye's bill to incentivise the building of new homes passes.
- 1 July – 1948 Keerbergen Fiat G.212 crash
- 23 July – Association belge des familles des disparus founded
- 22 August – Order in Council for the implementation of the De Taeye Act.
- 25 August – Treaty of Brussels, establishing the Brussels Pact for economic, social and cultural collaboration and collective self-defence, comes into effect.
- 8 October – Agreement of Belgium and Luxembourg with the United States for exchanges under the Fulbright Program.

== Publications ==
- Belgisch Staatsblad/Moniteur belge
- Jean Lejeune, Principauté de Liège (Liège, A.S.B.L. Le Grand Liège)
- Paul Peeters, Figures bollandiennes contemporaines (Brussels, Durendal)

== Births ==
- 25 September – Daniel Pelletti, painter (died 2026)

== Deaths ==
- 15 March – Børge Nyrop (born 1881 in Denmark), painter
- 17 September – Prosper Dezitter (born 1893), wartime collaborator
