= 1953 in Belgium =

- Decades: 1930s; 1940s; 1950s; 1960s; 1970s
- See also: Other events of 1953; List of years in Belgium

Events in the year 1953 in Belgium.

== Incumbents ==
- Monarch – Baudouin
- Prime Minister – Jean Van Houtte

== Events ==
- 31 January to 1 February – North Sea flood damages Belgian coastal defences, killing 28
- 9 April – Princess Joséphine Charlotte of Belgium (1927–2005) marries Prince Jean of Luxembourg (1921–2019), with civil registration in the Grand Ducal Palace and a nuptial mass in Notre-Dame Cathedral, Luxembourg
- 14 October – Sabena Convair Crash
- 24 October – Firedamp explosion in the Many pit in Seraing, owned by Ougrée-Marihaye, kills 26 (12 Belgians and 14 Italian immigrant workers)
- 31 October – First public television broadcasts of the Belgian National Broadcasting Institute, from the Flagey Building in Brussels

== Publications ==
=== Non-fiction ===
- Gustave Cohen, Le Théâtre français en Belgique au Moyen Âge (Brussels, La Renaissance du Livre)
- Paul Harsin, La Révolution liégeoise de 1789

=== Fiction ===
- Louis Paul Boon, De Kapellekensbaan
- Hergé, Explorers on the Moon, serialised 1952-1953
- Georges Simenon, Feux rouges, Maigret et l'homme du banc, and Maigret se trompe
- Willy Vandersteen, De dolle musketiers, Suske & Wiske album (serialised 1952–1953)

== Art and architecture ==
Paintings

- René Magritte, Golconda

Performance

- 14 to 18 July – Théâtre National de Belgique production of Jean Giraudoux's Ondine at the Lyric Theatre (Hammersmith).

== Births ==
- 10 January
  - Olga Zrihen, politician
  - Josiane Vanhuysse, cyclist
- 23 January – Carl Devlies, politician
- 26 January – Daniël Theys, glassmaker
- 1 February – Walter de Paduwa, radio DJ
- 21 February – Siegfried Bracke, politician
- 14 March – Dirk Van der Maelen, politician
- 3 April – Pieter Aspe, writer (died 2021)
- 5 April – Paul Broekx, Olympic canoer
- 11 April – Guy Verhofstadt, politician
- 1 May – Willy Linthout, comics author
- 7 May – Alain Brichant, tennis player
- 6 June – Jan Durnez, politician
- 30 June – Koen Fossey, illustrator
- 22 July – René Vandereycken, footballer
- 25 August – Georges De Moor, health statistician
- 20 September – André Delcroix, cyclist
- 26 September – Micha Marah, singer
- 27 September – Jean-Paul Comart, actor
- 9 October – Marcia De Wachter, economist
- 17 October
  - Thierry Soumagne, fencer
  - Claire Vanhonnacker, singer (died 1992)
- 27 October – Daniel Guldemont, martial artist
- 28 October – Jean-Marie Berckmans, writer (died 2008)
- 19 November – Didier de Chaffoy de Courcelles, businessman
- 20 November – Étienne De Beule, cyclist
- 4 December – Jean-Marie Pfaff, goalkeeper

== Deaths ==
- 6 January – Maurice Corneil de Thoran (born 1881), musician
- 9 January – Jean Brusselmans (born 1884), painter
- 17 January – Jean de Bosschère (born 1878), writer and painter
- 19 January – Jean Delville (born 1867), painter
- 11 March – Charles Saroléa (born 1870), philologist
- 26 March – Paul Loicq (born 1888), hockey administrator
- 16 May – Django Reinhardt (born 1910), jazz musician
- 2 June – Servais Le Roy (born 1865), entertainment
- 20 June – Henri de Man (born 1885), politician
- 25 June – Jules Van Nuffel (born 1883), priest and musicologist
- 12 July – Joseph Jongen (born 1873), composer
- 14 September – Pierre Nolf (born 1873), scientist
- 18 September – Charles de Tornaco (born 1927), racing driver
- 2 November – Émile Cammaerts (born 1878), writer
