= Berckmans =

Berckmans is a Flemish surname. Notable people with the surname include:

- Arthur Berckmans (1929–2020), Belgian comics author better known as Berck
- Baron Louis Berckmans (1801–1883), Belgian medical doctor and horticulturist
- Jean-Marie Berckmans (1953–2008), Belgian author
