= 1946 in Belgium =

- Decades: 1920s; 1930s; 1940s; 1950s; 1960s
- See also: Other events of 1946; List of years in Belgium

Events from the year 1946 in Belgium

== Incumbents ==
- Monarch: Leopold III
- Regent: Prince Charles
- Prime Minister:
  - Achille Van Acker (to 13 March)
  - Paul-Henri Spaak (13 March to 31 March)
  - Achille Van Acker (31 March to 3 August)
  - Camille Huysmans (from 3 August)

== Events ==
- 10 January – Paul-Henri Spaak was elected as the first President of the UN General Assembly
- 17 February – Legislative elections
- 24 February – Provincial elections
- 12 April – Flemish nationalist leader August Borms executed by firing squad as a collaborator
- October – École Royale Technique de la Force Aérienne established outside Sint-Truiden
- 24 November – Municipal elections

== Publications ==
- Fernand Baudhuin, Histoire économique de la Belgique, 1914-1939 (Brussels, E. Bruylant)
- Jan Albert Goris, The Growth of the Belgian Nation (New York, N.Y., Belgian Government Information Center)
- Joseph Lefèvre, L'Angleterre et la Belgique à travers les cinq derniers siècles
- Katharine Roberts, And the bravest of these (Garden City, N.Y., Doubleday & Company)

== Deaths ==
- 21 February – José Streel (born 1911), journalist and Nazi collaborator
- 22 September – Marguerite Putsage (born 1868), painter
