= 1949 in Belgium =

- Decades: 1920s; 1930s; 1940s; 1950s; 1960s
- See also: Other events of 1949; List of years in Belgium

Events from the year 1949 in Belgium

== Incumbents ==
- Monarch: Leopold III
- Regent: Prince Charles
- Prime Minister:
  - Paul-Henri Spaak (to 11 August)
  - Gaston Eyskens (from 11 August)

== Events ==
- 4 April – Paul-Henri Spaak signs the North Atlantic Treaty in Washington, D.C.
- 26 June – 1949 Belgian general election; first in which women fully enfranchised

== Publications ==
- Léon Kochnitzky, Adolphe Sax and his Saxophone (New York, Belgian Govt. Information Center)
- Charles Leirens, Belgian Music (New York, Belgian Govt. Information Center)

== Births ==
- 17 February – Peter Piot, microbiologist
- 24 March – Richard Biefnot, politician (died 2020)
- 21 November – Willy Vande Walle, Japanologist

== Deaths ==
- 15 January – Lu Zhengxiang (born 1871), diplomat, politician and monk
- 9 December – Frédéric Alvin (born 1864), numismatist
