= 1951 in Belgium =

- Decades: 1930s; 1940s; 1950s; 1960s; 1970s
- See also: Other events of 1951; List of years in Belgium

The following events happened during 1951 in the Kingdom of Belgium.

== Incumbents ==
- Monarch –
  - Leopold III (until 16 July), then Baudouin (from 17 July)
  - Regent: Prince Baudouin, Duke of Brabant (until 16 July)
- Prime Minister – Joseph Pholien

== Events ==
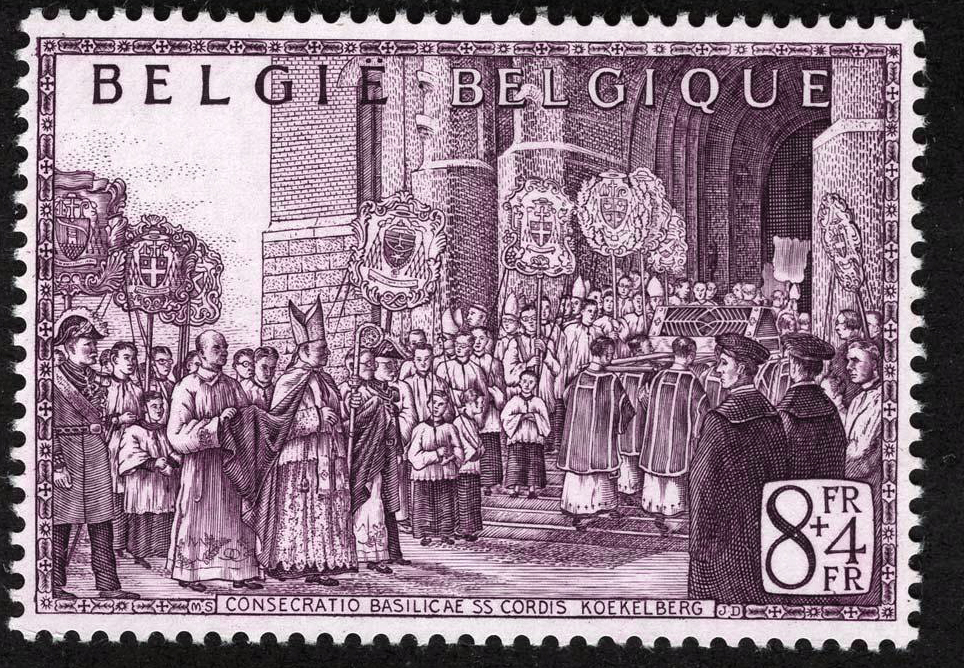

- 9 to 10 January – Eisenhower in Belgium.
- 31 January – Belgian contingent of the United Nations Command for the Korean War disembark at Busan.
- 18 April – Treaty of Paris signed, establishing the European Coal and Steel Community with Belgium as a member.
- 25 April – Pope Pius XII makes the Church of Our Lady of Tongre in Chièvres a minor basilica.
- 16 July – The Royal Question culminates with the formal abdication of King Leopold III.
- 17 July – Baudouin is sworn in as King of the Belgians.
- 14 October – Relics of Saint Albert of Leuven installed in Basilica of the Sacred Heart, Brussels
- 5 December – Migration Conference in Brussels adopts the resolution establishing Provisional Intergovernmental Committee for the Movement of Migrants from Europe.

== Art and architecture ==
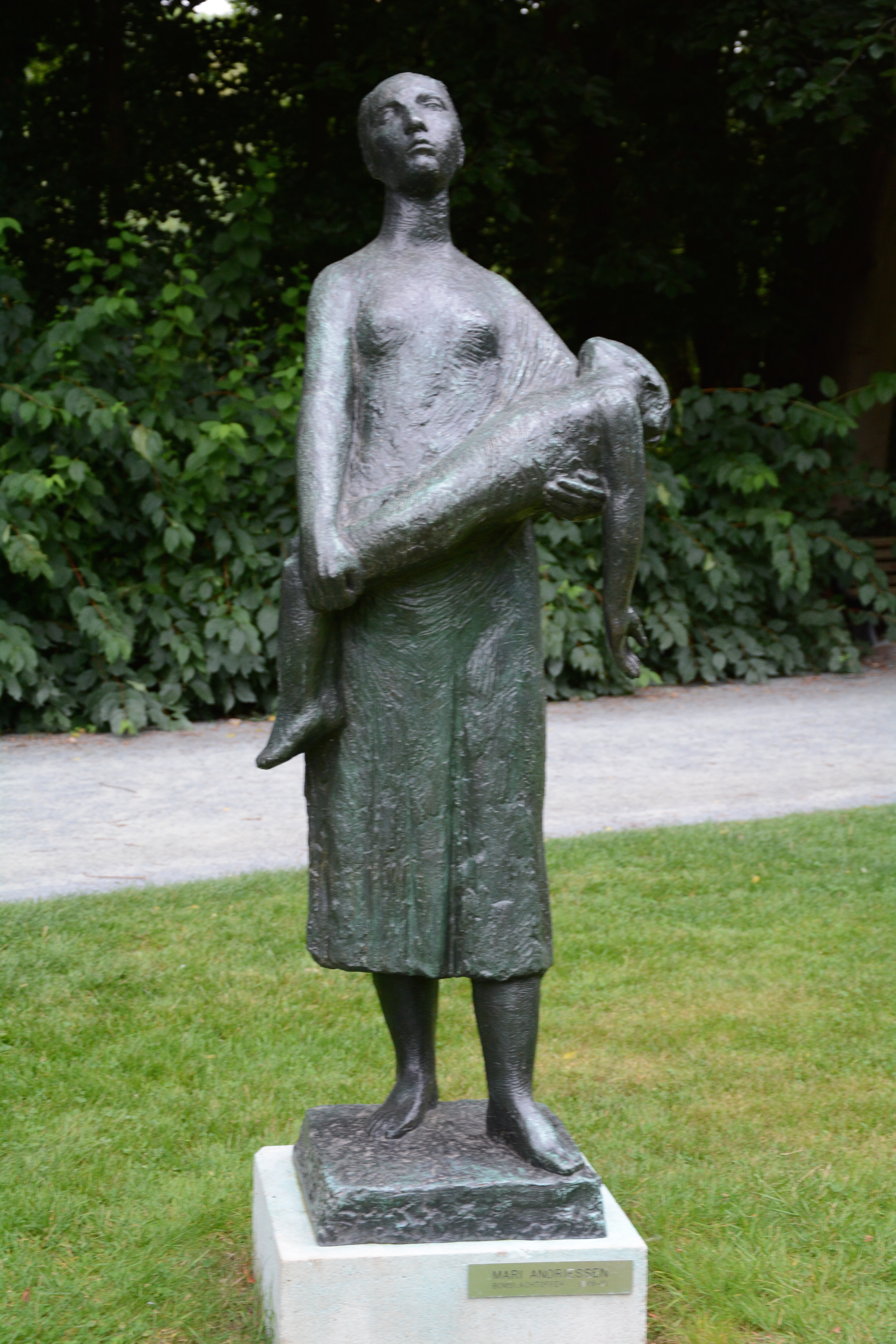
Mari Andriessen, Bomb Victim (1951)

Sculpture

- Mari Andriessen, Bomb Victim (Middelheim Open Air Sculpture Museum)
- Alfred Courtens, Equestrian Statue of Albert I, Brussels

== Publications ==
- Françoise Mallet-Joris, Le Rempart des Béguines

== Births ==
- 5 April – Frank Moulaert, academic
- 10 June – Lucien De Brauwere, cyclist (died 2020)
- 30 October – Charles Delhez, priest-sociologist (died 2026)

== Deaths ==
- 20 December – Valerius Coucke (born 1888), biblical scholar
