= 1942 in Belgium =

- Decades: 1920s; 1930s; 1940s; 1950s; 1960s
- See also: Other events of 1942; List of years in Belgium

Events in the year 1942 in Belgium

== Incumbents ==
- Monarch (in captivity): Leopold III
- Prime Minister (in exile): Hubert Pierlot
- Head of German occupying forces: Alexander von Falkenhausen
- Head of the administrative staff of the Occupation: Eggert Reeder

== Events ==
- 1 January – Belgian government in exile becomes a signatory of the Atlantic Charter.
- 3 January – Occupying forces prohibit listening to radio broadcasts not subject to German control.
- 21 January – Eleven hostages killed by the occupying forces.
- 25 January – Temperatures reach 12 below zero Celsius.
- 6 March – Decree issued for the recruitment of forced labour for German factories.
- 10 March – Walloon Legion parades in Brussels.
- 1 April – Hendrik de Man opposes the unified trade union
- 5 April – Court of Cassation finds that secretaries-general, civil servants appointed to lead ministries in the absence of the government, have no legislative powers, annulling the decree of 15 February 1941 instituting administrative legislation.
- 9 April – Decree obliging miners to work Sundays and feast days.
- 16 April – Decree prohibits the establishment of new businesses or expansion of existing businesses.
- 9 May – Daily meat ration reduced from 35 grammes to 20 grammes.
- 27 May – Decree obliging Jews to wear an identifying Star of David.
- 2 July – Prime Minister in exile broadcasts an appeal to all Belgians to defend their country.
- 13 July – Secret meetings between representatives of the Christian Democrat, Liberal and Labour parties to discuss post-war policy.
- 18 July – Booksellers receive a list of 1,470 titles that they are no longer permitted to stock or sell.
- 26 July – A hundred Communists detained for deportation to Germany.
- 31 August – Belgian section of the Red Orchestra dismantled.
- 6 October – All men aged between 18 and 50 obliged to find work either in Belgium or in Germany.

== Publications ==
- Paul Peeters, L'Œuvre des Bollandistes (Brussels)

== Births ==
- 18 July – Prince Alexandre of Belgium (died 2009)
- 20 September – Robbe De Hert, film director (died 2020)
- 2 May – Jacques Rogge, 8th President of the International Olympic Committee (died 2021)

== Deaths ==
- 21 January – Adelin Hartveld (born 1917), resister
- 22 January – Reimond Tollenaere (born 1909), collaborator
- 3 April – Paul Gilson (born 1865), composer
- 22 October – Staf De Clercq (born 1884), quisling
