= 1950 in Belgium =

- Decades: 1930s; 1940s; 1950s; 1960s; 1970s
- See also: Other events of 1950; List of years in Belgium

Events from the year 1950 in Belgium

== Incumbents ==
- Monarch: Leopold III
  - Regent: Prince Charles, Count of Flanders (to July 20)
  - Regent: Prince Baudouin, Duke of Brabant (from August 11)
- Prime Minister:
  - Gaston Eyskens (to 8 June)
  - Jean Duvieusart (8 June to 16 August)
  - Joseph Pholien (from 16 August)

== Events ==
- 12 March – Royal question: 1950 Belgian monarchy referendum A referendum on the monarchy shows 57.7% support the return of King Leopold III from exile to resume exercise of his constitutional powers, 42.3% against. The King has said he would abdicate if he did not receive 55% support, and that the final decision would be for the federal parliament.
- 18 March – The Belgian government collapses, after the March 12 referendum.
- 15 April – After negotiation with politicians, Leopold announces that he would be willing to delegate his authority temporarily.
- 4 June – 1950 Belgian general election. The result is a victory for the Christian Social Party and Jean Duvieusart becomes Prime Minister. This election is the last in Belgian history where a single party achieves an absolute majority.
- 20 July – Prince Charles, Count of Flanders, Prince Regent of Belgium since 1944, returns the authority of the throne to Leopold III.
- 22 July – Royal question: King Leopold III returns after a decade in exile, provoking a general strike, particularly in Wallonia.
- 30 July – 4 workers striking over the Royal question are shot dead by the Gendarmerie, at Grâce-Berleur near Liège.
- 1 August – Royal question: King Leopold publicly announces that he will abdicate in favor of his son, Baudouin.
- 6 August – Monarchist demonstrations lead to a riot in Brussels.
- 9 August – Philipp Schmitt, 47, the German SS Sturmbannfuhrer who oversaw the deportation to Germany of prisoners from the Fort Breendonk concentration camp, near Antwerp, is shot by a firing squad in Antwerp, becoming the last person to be executed in Belgium.
- 11 August – Baudouin of Belgium, Prince Baudouin, Duke of Brabant is administered the oath to become Prince Royal, exercising all of the powers of his father, Leopold III, who retains the title of King of Belgium. The Senate and Chamber of Deputies have approved Leopold's decision to relinquish power, 349–0 with eight abstentions. Leopold will formally abdicate on 16 July 1951.
- 16 August – Joseph Pholien becomes Prime Minister of Belgium.
- 18 August – Communist anti-monarchist Julien Lahaut is assassinated in Seraing; no-one is brought to justice for the crime.
- 25 August – Belgium creates the Corps Voluntaires Corea to fight in the Korean War, and sends 900 men in the 1st Belgian Battalion, who will arrive in December. They will have 102 men killed.

== Publications ==
- Guido Gezelle and Karel van de Woestijne, Lyra Belgica I: Two Flemish Poets in English Translation, translated by Clark and Frances Stillman (New York, Belgian Government Information Center)

== Births ==
- 19 February – Frie Leysen, festival director (died 2020)
- 23 October – Guy Bleus, artist
- 20 November – Véronique Caprasse, politician

== Deaths ==
- 14 April – Jean-Marie Van Cauwenbergh (born 1879), bishop
- 12 May – Anna De Weert (born 1867), painter
- 9 July – Charles Théodore Bernier (born 1871), engraver
- 18 August – Paul Peeters (born 1870), Jesuit
