= 1952 in Belgium =

- Decades: 1930s; 1940s; 1950s; 1960s; 1970s
- See also: Other events of 1952; List of years in Belgium

Events from the year 1952 in Belgium

== Incumbents ==
- Monarch: Baudouin
- Prime Minister: Joseph Pholien (to 15 January); Jean Van Houtte (from 15 January)

== Events ==
- 25 July – Treaty of Paris establishing the European Coal and Steel Community comes into force.
- 12 October – Municipal elections

== Births ==
- 14 June – Filip Reyntjens, academic
- 19 September – Bernard de Dryver, racing driver

== Deaths ==
- 21 July — Antonina Grégoire (born 1914), communist partisan
- 1 October – John Langenus (born 1891), football referee.
