= 1944 in Belgium =

- Decades: 1920s; 1930s; 1940s; 1950s; 1960s
- See also: Other events of 1944; List of years in Belgium

Events in the year 1944 in Belgium.

== Incumbents ==
- Monarch: Leopold III
- Regent: Prince Charles (from 21 September)
- Prime Minister: Hubert Pierlot

== Events ==
January

- 14 January – Occupying German authorities order evacuation of civilians from the Belgian coast.
- 16 January – Groupe G resistance organisation dynamites pylons to sabotage electricity supply.

February

- 5 February – Occupying authorities streamline procedure for death sentences on charges of "terrorism".

April

- 11 April – Heavy allied bombing of industrial targets and transport infrastructure in Belgian cities.
- 19 April – Mechelen and Leuven bombed.

May

- 21 May – Cardinal Van Roey appeals to Allies to cease bombing civilian targets in Belgium.

June

- 7 June – Leopold III, under house arrest since 1940, deported to Germany together with his wife and children.

July

- 18 July – Military occupation under General Alexander von Falkenhausen replaced by Reichskommissariat of Belgium and Northern France under Reichskommissar Josef Grohé.
- 22 July – Delegates of the Belgian government in exile are among the founding signatories of the Bretton Woods system establishing the International Monetary Fund and the International Bank for Reconstruction and Development
- 27 July – Collaborationist leaders Jef van de Wiele and Hendrik Elias meet with Heinrich Himmler.

August

- 18 August
  - Courcelles Massacre in retaliation for the assassination of the collaborationist mayor of Charleroi by the Belgian Resistance.
  - Over 330 killed and 600 injured in American mistaken bombing of Namur.
- 31 August – Many Belgian collaborators flee to Germany.

September

- 2 September – Allied ground forces enter Belgium.
- 4 September – Liberation of Brussels and Antwerp; Independent Belgian Brigade (Brigade Piron) enters Brussels.
- 5 September – Customs Convention between Belgium, the Netherlands and Luxembourg signed.
- 7 September – Liberation of Liège.
- 8 September – Battle of Geel begins (to 23 September)
- 15 September – Cinemas reopened in liberated parts of Belgium.
- 21 September – Prince Charles, Count of Flanders, is appointed Prince Regent of Belgium in the King's absence.
- 27 September – Government in exile becomes government of national unity.

October

- 2 October – Battle of the Scheldt begins (to 8 November)
- 12 October – First V-1 flying bomb attack on Belgium.

November

- 1 November – Operation Infatuate launched
- 3 November – Last German forces in Belgium surrender at Knokke.
- 8 November – Belgian Parliament lifts parliamentary privilege of members of collaborationist organisations.
- 18 November – Resistance groups disarmed.
- 25 November – Resistance groups demonstrate in Parliament to demand official recognition.
- 28 November – Allied shipping starts to use the Port of Antwerp.

December

- 16 December – German counter-offensive into Belgium: Battle of the Bulge begins with Battle of Lanzerath Ridge, Battle of Losheim Gap, Battle of St. Vith and Battle of Elsenborn Ridge
- 17 December – Malmedy massacre
- 20 December – Siege of Bastogne begins (to 27 December)

== Births ==
- 22 March – Alfons Thijs, historian (died 2014)
- 31 March – Jean-Marie André, scientist (died 2023)
- 5 April – Willy Planckaert, road bicycle racer
- 1 June – Freddy Herbrand, Olympic athlete
- 8 October – Maurice Bodson, politician (died 2020)
- 21 December – Jacques Beurlet, footballer (died 2020)

== Deaths ==
- 14 January – Walthère Dewé, resistance leader, shot in the street
- 28 January – Aloïs Biebuyck, officer in the First World War
- 23 February – Leo Baekeland, chemical engineer
- 3 March – Paul-Émile Janson, liberal politician (Buchenwald concentration camp)
- 21 March – Pierre de Caters, aviator
- 12 April – Emmanuel de Blommaert, Olympic rider
- 10 May – Adolphe De Meulemeester, colonial official
- 27 May – Adrienne Barbanson, musical patron
- 9 June – Marie-Louise Hénin, resister
- 12 August – Suzanne Spaak, resister
- 17 August – Oswald Englebin, collaborationist mayor of Charleroi, assassinated
- 20 August – Hippolyte De Kempeneer, film producer
- 7 October – Abraham Leon, Trotskyist theorist (Auschwitz concentration camp)
- 1 December – Balthazar De Beukelaer, Olympic fencer
- 11 December – Joseph Maréchal, Thomist philosopher

== See also ==
- Chronology of the liberation of Belgian cities and towns during World War II
