= The Cosmopolitan Chicken Project =

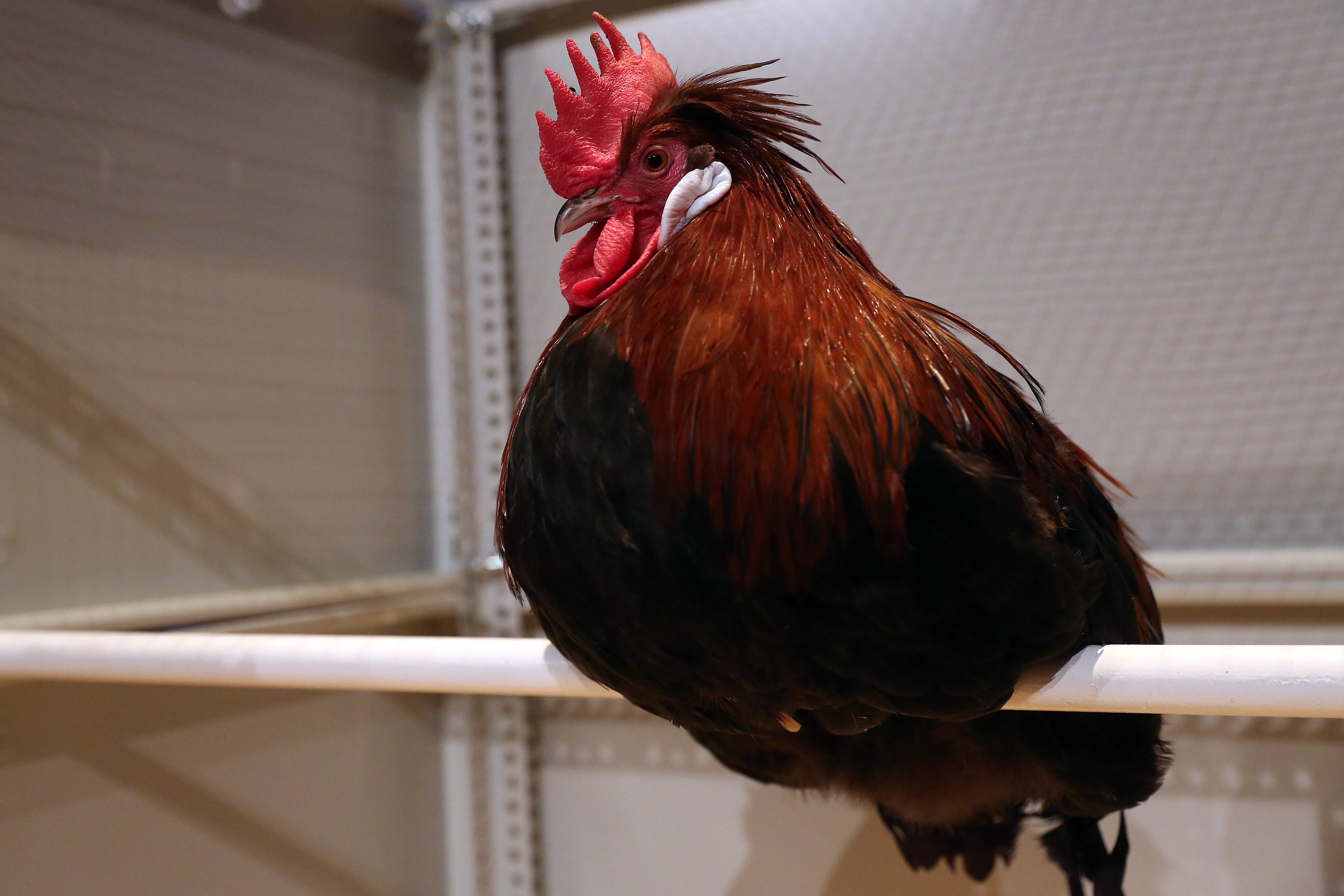
The Cosmopolitan Chicken Project at Ars Electronica 2013

The Cosmopolitan Chicken Project (CCP, 1999) is a global, transdisciplinary and transtemporal examination of the themes of biocultural diversity and identity through the interplay of art, science and beauty. In the CCP Koen Vanmechelen cross-breeds chicken breeds from different countries. His ultimate goal is the creation of a Cosmopolitan Chicken carrying the genes of all the planet's chicken breeds. Much more than a mere domesticated animal, the chicken is art in itself.

It serves as a metaphor for the human animal and its relationship with the biological and cultural diversity of the planet.

== Research ==
While the native breeds that descended from the original chicken (the Red Junglefowl) are evolutionary dead-ends (being shaped to reflect the typical cultural characteristics of its community), Vanmechelen's hybrids are solutions. Many years of crossbreeding have proven that each successive generation of hybrids is ‘better’. It is more resilient, it lives longer, is less susceptible to diseases, and it exhibits less aggressive behavior. Genetic diversity is essential, proves the Cosmopolitan Chicken Research Programme (CC®P), which studies the various CCP hybrids.

Central to Koen Vanmechelen's oeuvre is the chicken. More specifically: the interbreeding of domesticated chickens from different countries and the expected creation of a cosmopolitan hybrid. Vanmechelen uses the animal, which has been co-evolving with the human animal for more than 7.000 years, as a metaphor for the global cultural and genetic mix that diversity and hybridisation create. His work also questions the position of the human animal on the planet.

== History ==
In the millennium year 2.000, he presented his first ‘crossing’, the Mechelse Bresse, a hybrid born out of the Belgian species Mechelse Koekoek and the French Poulet de Bresse. At this moment the 17th hybrid species, the Mechelse Styrian, is a fact. Eighteen countries have been included in the CCP. The chicken, its egg and cage, are powerful symbols that allow Vanmechelen to make links between scientific, political, philosophical and ethical issues. The intrinsic philosophical system he thus developed are meant to be the subject of debates, discussions and lectures. To secure the future of the project, the genetic material of all the Mechelse hybrids is stored. The artist is working on sculptures based on the chickens’ DNA and is considering dedomestication or the release of his birds into the wild.
