= 1945 in Belgium =

- Decades: 1920s; 1930s; 1940s; 1950s; 1960s
- See also: Other events of 1945; List of years in Belgium

Events in the year 1945 in Belgium.

== Incumbents ==
- Monarch: Leopold III
- Regent: Prince Charles.
- Prime Minister: Hubert Pierlot (until 12 February), Achille Van Acker (starting 12 February)

== Events ==
January

- 1 January
  - Operation Bodenplatte launched.
  - US troops commit Chenogne massacre.
- 2–5 January – Battle of Bure fought.
- 11 January – Socialists leave the government.
- 16 January – Wildcat strike in the Port of Antwerp over payment of danger money.
- 25 January – Battle of the Bulge ends.

February

- 4 February – Liberation of Belgium complete.
- 7 February – Hubert Pierlot's government resigns.
- 12 February – Achille Van Acker heads government of national unity.

March

- 20 March – Financial agreement signed between National Bank of Belgium and Bank of France.

April

- 29 April – General Federation of Belgian Labour founded.

May

- 6 May – Central office of the Belgian Socialist Party publicly opposes the return of Leopold III.
- 12 May – The Prime Minister and Prince Regent meet with the king to discuss his return.
- 14 May – Anti-monarchist rioting in Liège.

June

- 9 June – Committees for collective bargaining established.
- 14 June – King communicates to the Prime Minister that his health now allows him to return to Belgium.
- 15 June – Yser Tower dynamited.
- 16 June – Prime Minister proffers his resignation over the issue of the Royal Question.

July

- 15 July – Government resumes its activities after the Prince Regent declined to accept the Prime Minister's resignation.
- 30 July – National Labour Congress demands 20 per cent pay increases, 8 paid days off each year, and family assistance.

August

- 2 August – Catholic Party removed from government of national unity in reshuffle.
- 17 August – Forty Belgians among those liberated from the Japanese-run Weixian Internment Camp in northern China.
- 18 August – Opening of the founding conference of the Christian Social Party.

September

- 19 September
  - About 200,000 collaborators deprived of their civil and political rights.
  - National Theatre of Belgium founded under the influence of Herman Teirlinck.
- 30 September – Leopold III publicly declares that he will accept whatever the decision of the people will be on his return.

October

- 21 October – Walloon Congress calls for regional autonomy in the Belgian state.

November

- 6 November – Government publishes a white paper on the Royal Question.

December

- 27 December – Belgian membership of United Nations ratified.
- 28 December – Belgavox begins producing cinema newsreels.

== Publications ==
- Charles Verlinden, Les Empereurs Belges de Constantinople (Brussels, Charles Dessart)

== Art and architecture ==
July

- 3 July – Art association Jeune peinture belge established in Brussels, with Willy Anthoons, René Barbaix, Gaston Bertrand, Anne Bonnet, Jan Cox, Jack Godderis, Emile Mahy, Marc Mendelson, Charles Pry, Mig Quinet, Rik Slabbinck and Louis Van Lint among the founding members.

== Births ==
- 1 March - Wilfried Van Moer, footballer (died 2021)
- 6 April - Léon Dolmans, footballer
- 22 April - Eddy Baldewijns, politician
- 29 May - Daniel Van Ryckeghem, road bicycle racer (died 2008)
- 12 June - Henri Xhonneux, film director (died 1995)
- 19 August – Jacques De Decker, writer (died 2020)
- 13 September - Noël Godin, anarchist comedian (died 2026)
- 20 September - Nicolas Dewalque, footballer
- 22 September - Ann Christy (singer) (died 1984)
- 25 September - Frans Janssens, footballer (died 2024)
- 6 October - Luc Sanders, footballer
- 16 November - Jan Bucquoy, anarchist

== Deaths ==
- 1 January – Émile Fairon (born 1875), archivist
- 10 January – August Vermeylen, art historian
- 11 April – Kamiel Van Baelen, novelist, in Dachau concentration camp
- 30 May – Roger Libbrecht, last of the thirteen colonels who headed the Secret Army
- 23 August – Princess Stéphanie of Belgium
- 14 December – Victor de Laveleye, liberal politician, newsreader on the BBC's wartime Radio Belgique
- 27 December – Georges Hulin de Loo, art historian
- 30 December – Jules Pappaert, footballer

== See also ==
- Chronology of the liberation of Belgian cities and towns during World War II
