= 1947 in Belgium =

- Decades: 1920s; 1930s; 1940s; 1950s; 1960s
- See also: Other events of 1947; List of years in Belgium

Events from the year 1947 in Belgium

== Incumbents ==
- Monarch: Leopold III
- Regent: Prince Charles
- Prime Minister:
  - Camille Huysmans (to 20 March)
  - Paul-Henri Spaak (from 20 March)

== Events ==
- 13 March – Camille Huysmans proffers his resignation as prime minister.
- 28 March – premiere of Marie-Thérèse Bodart's play Et Adam répondit (And Adam Answered) at the Royal Park Theatre.

== Publications ==
- Marnix Gijsen (ed.), Belgium under Occupation (New York, Moretus Press for the Belgian Government Information Center)
- Joseph Lefèvre, Spinola et la Belgique, 1601-1627
- Robert E. Merriam, Dark December: The Full Account of the Battle of the Bulge (Chicago, Ziff-Davis)
- Georges Simenon, Maigret se fâche

== Births ==
- 1 April – Philippe Kirsch, Belgian-born Canadian lawyer and judge
- 19 April – Claude Laverdure, writer (died 2020)

== Deaths ==
- 9 February — Anna Kernkamp (born 1868), artist
- 11 March – Édouard Poncelet (born 1865), archivist
- 8 September – Victor Horta (born 1861), architect
- 10 November – Victor Matthys, (born 1914), politician and Nazi collaborator (died 1947)
