= Daniel Pelletti =

Belgian painter (1948–2026)

- Born: 25 September 1948; La Louvière, Belgium
- Died: 4 January 2026 (aged 77)
- Occupation: Painter

Daniel Pelletti (25 September 1948 – 4 January 2026) was a Belgian painter.

Pelletti was deeply attached to his home city of La Louvière, deeply enthralled by its industrial roots. He received praise from Paul Caso, who lauded him highly in the community of Walloon art. He served as director of the École des Beaux-Arts de Braine-l'Alleud from 1996 to 2010.

Pelletti died on 4 January 2026, at the age of 77.

== Personal exhibitions ==
- Daniel Pelletti : Peintures 1966-1974 (2020)
