= Willem Ombelet =

Belgian gynecologist/infertility specialist

- Born: Leuven, Belgium
- Known for: Pioneer in Intrauterine insemination; The Walking Egg
- Scientific career
- Fields: Physiology; Obstetrics & Gynecology
- Workplaces: Leuven University; Pretoria University; Hasselt University; Ghent University
- Website: thewalkingegg.com

Willem Ombelet is a Belgian gynecologist/infertility specialist. From 1990 until 2019, he was the head of the fertility center of the Ziekenhuis Oost-Limburg hospital in Genk, Belgium. Ombelet is a pioneer of intrauterine insemination (IUI). He is the founder and editor-in-chief the open-access journal Views & Vision in ObGyn. Ombelet co-founded The Walking Egg, a non-profit organization that tackles global infertility in a holistic, multidisciplinary, and integral way.

Ombelet taught reproductive medicine at University of Limburg (now University of Hasselt) and is a consultant (Reproductive Medicine) at Hasselt University.

== Career ==
Scientific work and activities

From 2001 until 2004, Ombelet was the President of the Flemish Society of Obstetrics and Gynecology (VVOG). He has authored more than 170 internationally peer-reviewed articles and has received two international awards. One was "The Best of What's New Award" from Popular Science Magazine in 2014. In addition, Ombelet is the co-editor of 18 books.

Ombelet published several studies on maternal and perinatal outcomes after using assisted reproductive techniques. He stressed the importance of preventing complications due to aggressive ovarian stimulation protocols such as Ovarian hyperstimulation syndrome, a life-threatening disease. He also promoted using single embryo transfer to prevent multiple pregnancies, the leading cause of maternal and perinatal complications.

Ombelet is the founder of the Genk Institute for Fertility Technology (GIFT) and was chairman of seven international "Andrology in the Nineties" meetings.

Ombelet is the founder and editor-in-chief of "Facts, Views & Vision in ObGyn", an international PubMed-cited peer-reviewed journal for obstetricians, gynecologists, reproductive physicians, ethicists, basic scientists, and others who treat and research women's health issues. In 2019, Facts, Views & Vision became the official journal of the European Society for Gynaecological Endoscopy the ESGE (European Society for Gynaecological Endoscopy). Ombelet remains the editor-in-chief of this PubMed-cited scientific Journal. It is published four times a year.

IUI

Since 1986, Ombelet has promoted intrauterine insemination (IUI) as a cost-effective and safe method of assisted reproduction in selected cases of moderate male and unexplained infertility. He wrote many scientific papers on this subject; the most important one was published in 2018. Furthermore, with Ben Cohlen (Zwolle, the Netherlands), head of the Fertility Center Isala, he edited a book on IUI and worked on the WHO guidelines for IUI.

IVF

In 2009, a new innovative simplified IVF system was developed by Professor Jonathan Van Blerkom from the Department of Molecular, Cellular, and Developmental Biology at the University of Colorado, Boulder, USA. The simplified IVF system was tested and validated for human application in Genk resulting in 5 scientific publications showing the effectiveness and safety of the system.

In 2015, a collaborative project was started in Ghana with the support of the Pentecost Church and in close partnership with Nana Yaw Osei, Fertility Counselor & CEO of the Association of Childless Couples Of Ghana (ACCOG Ghana]). Kwadwo, the first African TWE baby, was born in Accra on August 7, 2017.
