= Sulmtaler =

Breed of chicken

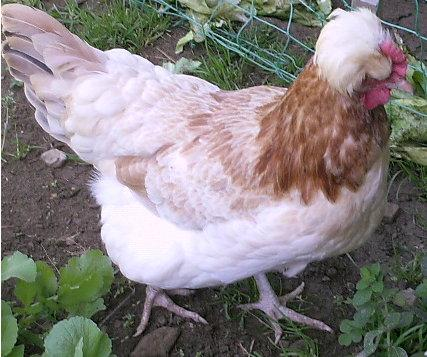
- Sulmtaler hen
- Country of origin: Austria
- Standard: SSO (Austria, in German)
- Use: dual-purpose, eggs and meat

Traits
- Weight: Male: 3–4 kg; Female: 2.5–3.5 kg
- Egg color: cream to light brown

Classification
- PCGB: rare soft feather: heavy
- Chicken; Gallus gallus domesticus

The Sulmtaler is an Austrian breed of domestic chicken. It originates in the Sulmtal, the valley of the Sulm river, in southern Styria, in the south-east of Austria, and takes its name from that valley.

== History ==
Like the Altsteirer, the Sulmtaler derives from the country chickens raised in Styria, particularly in the Kainachtal, the Lassnitztal, the Sulmtal and the Saggautal. In the second half of the nineteenth century these were subjected to massive cross-breeding with imported Cochin, Dorking and Houdan stock to create heavy meat birds for fattening. In about 1900 some breeders brought together the small remaining stock of chickens of the former type, and the original breed was reconstituted.

== Characteristics ==
Sulmtaler is a hardy dual-purpose breed, kept both for eggs and meat. Cocks weigh 3–4 kg and hens 2.5–3.5 kg. Hens are non-sitters, and lay 130-180 eggs of about 55 g in weight per year.

The Sulmtaler is raised almost exclusively in the gold wheaten colour variety, and this was the only colour standardised in 1958. A white variety was created in the German Democratic Republic after the Second World War. Silver wheaten and blue wheaten varieties were accepted in Austria in 2013. Silver-blue wheaten is not yet accepted.
