= Claude De Bruyn =

Belgian serviceman (1943–2020)

- Born: 1 September 1943; Uccle, Belgium
- Died: 27 August 2020 (aged 76)
- Occupations: Soldier; Television presenter

Claude De Bruyn (1 September 1943 – 27 August 2020) was a Belgian serviceman and television presenter.

== Biography ==
Lieutenant-Colonel De Bruyn was born in Uccle in 1943. He spent three years at the École royale des cadets before being admitted to the Royal Military Academy. Lastly, he attended the École royale de Gendarmerie. In 1966, he graduated from the University of Liège with a degree in criminology.

In 1970, De Bruyn was hired by RTBF to host a weekly television program on road safety, titled Contacts. In 1978, the manual Feu vert pour le permis de conduire was published, intending to prepare drivers for their upcoming exams. De Bruyn left the program in 1980. He was promoted to the rank of Major in the Belgian Armed Forces and became District Commander of Seraing. In 1984, he was promoted to Lieutenant-Colonel. From 1986 to 1988, he presented the program Trafic, similar to Contacts, on the channel RTL-TVI.

In 1996, the publishing house De Boeck took over the production of Feu vert pour le permis de conduire. De Bruyn continued his work for the manual with De Boeck until his retirement in 1999. However, he remained passionate about driving safety and fervently defended driving protocols. In 2007, his son, Cedric, began working for road safety.

Claude De Bruyn died on 27 August 2020 at the age of 76.

== Publications ==
- Feu vert pour le permis de conduire
- Feu vert pour le guide
