= Louis Berckmans =

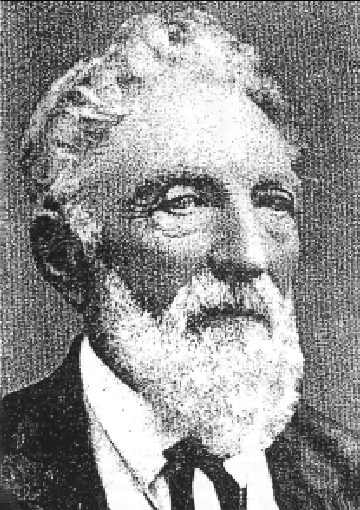
Louis Mathieu Edouard Berckmans, c. 1870.

Louis Mathieu Edouard Berckmans (19 October 1801 – 1883) was a Belgian medical doctor who was famous for his interest in plant biology and specifically in horticulture.

== Biography ==
Born in the present-day Lier, Belgium, Louis was the son of Joannes Berckmans and Carolina van Ravels. Lier was located in the former Austrian Netherlands, which had been annexed by Revolutionary France a few years before Louis's birth. He came from a family of great proprietors who had estates in what became the independent country of Belgium in 1830. In 1829, his first wife Marie Gaudens died when their son Prosper was born, and he subsequently married Marie Rubens in 1834.

After the Belgian Revolution was fought over the Berckman's family land, there were serious feuds between the family and strong political factions in the country. In 1851, Louis Berckmans came to the United States with his family and settled in Plainfield, New Jersey. In Plainfield he started a nursery with his son Prosper Berckmans where they grew over a thousand varieties of pears and experimented with a variety of other fruit trees. In 1857, they moved to Augusta, Georgia, and purchased 365-acre (1.48 km^{2}) of land, where they established Fruitland Nurseries, one of the first large, successful commercial nurseries in the South. Fruitland Nurseries also operated as an experimental station and botanical garden, growing numerous varieties of fruit trees and ornamentals and disseminating them throughout the United States. They imported many trees and plants from countries all over the world.

Today the Augusta National Golf Club, home of the Masters Tournament, occupies the former property of Fruitland Nurseries. In 1931, when golf champion Bobby Jones and his business partners created the club and golf course, two sons of Prosper Berckmans, Prosper J. A. Berckmans Jr. and Louis A. Berckmans, assisted in the landscape design of the course. In addition, the Berckmans' home, Fruitland Manor, became the Augusta National Clubhouse. Many of the plant varieties developed and improved by the Berckmans family still grow at Augusta National as part of its designed landscape.

== Sources ==
- https://web.archive.org/web/20120218140256/http://www.augusta.com/stories/040107/mas_122377.shtml
- http://southernedition.com/DaffodilsinEarlySouthernGardens.html
- http://www.georgiaencyclopedia.org/articles/business-economy/berckmans-nursery
