= Mireille Bastin =

Belgian painter (1943–2026)

- Born: 30 March 1943; Brussels, Belgium
- Died: 20 June 2026 (aged 83); Methamis, Belgium
- Occupation: Painter
- Parent: Ginette Javaux (mother)

Mireille Bastin (30 March 1943 – 20 June 2026) was a Belgian painter. A self-taught painter, her work was praised by Le Soir, and has been exhibited in Paris, Geneva, Tokyo, Singapore and New York.

Bastin died in Methamis on 20 June 2026, at the age of 83.
