= Koninklijke School voor Onderofficieren =

Royal School for Non-Commissioned Officers Koninklijke School voor Onderofficieren (KSOO)

Location
- Sint-Truiden; Belgium
- Coordinates: 50.784°N 5.235°E

Information
- Other name: École Royale des Sous-Officiers (ERSO)
- Former name: École Royale Technique de la Force Aérienne
- Type: Military training establishment
- Motto: Labor Omnia Vincit Improbus (Work conquers all)
- Established: September 2007
- Affiliation: Belgian Armed Forces
- Website: www.saffraanberg.be

The Koninklijke School voor Onderofficieren (Dutch) or École Royale des Sous-Officiers (French) is the main military training establishment in Belgium for non-officer staff of the Belgian armed forces.

== History ==
The site opened in 1946 as the École Royale Technique de la Force Aérienne, the main technical training school for the Belgian Air Force (founded during the Second World War at Snailwell in England). A fire in 1948 led to a temporary relocation to Tongeren while new buildings were constructed, with further works required in the late 1960s, when the campus took on its current structure.

In 2007-8 the site was widened from the Belgian Air Force to the Belgian Armed Forces.

== Structure ==
It is situated in the east of Belgium, in the northern Dutch-speaking half of the country, in Limburg.

The site is run by the Belgian Armed Forces (Defensie van België).

=== Training ===
It offers technical training.

== See also ==
- Royal Military Academy (Belgium), for officers
