= Charles Delhez =

Belgian Catholic priest and sociologist (1951–2026)

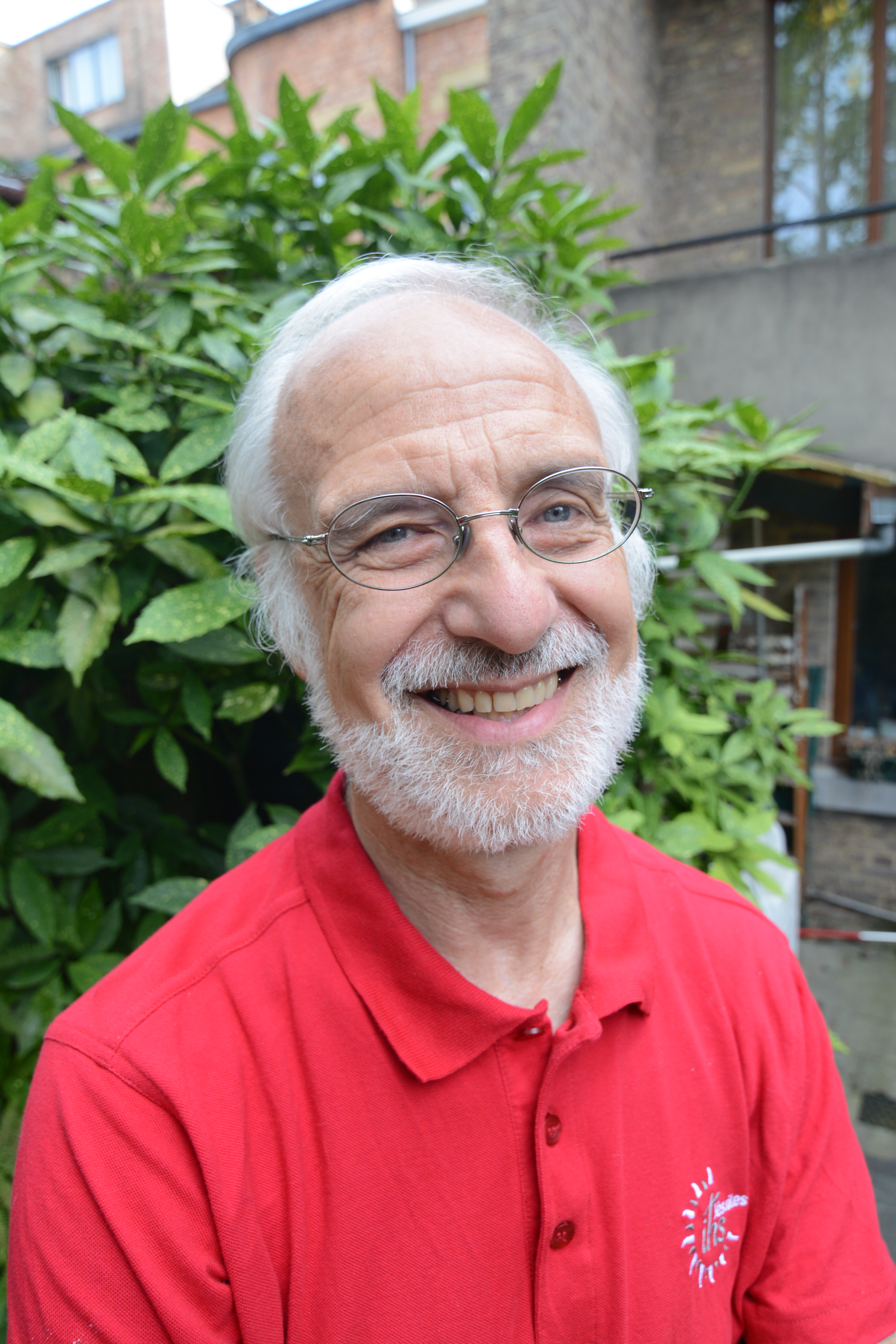
- Delhez in 2017
- Born: 30 October 1951; Uccle, Belgium
- Died: 8 April 2026 (aged 74); Ottignies-Louvain-la-Neuve, Belgium
- Occupations: Catholic priest; sociologist

Charles Delhez (30 October 1951 – 8 April 2026) was a Belgian Roman Catholic priest and sociologist.

== Biography ==
Delhez was born in Uccle on 30 October 1951. He was ordained a priest in 1982 and served at the Paroisse de Blocry in Louvain-la-Neuve. He participated in the Christian and citizen forum RivEspérance and was a Catholic voice in media such as Dimanche, of which he served as editor-in-chief, France 2, and RTBF. From 2011 to 2019, he taught religious sciences at the Université de Namur, a time during which he founded the Grandes conférences namuroises with Annie Degen. In 2018, he published Où allons-nous ? De la modernité au transhumanisme. He was also active in scouting, serving as chaplain of a troop in Louvain-la-Neuve.

Delhez died in Ottignies-Louvain-la-Neuve on 8 April 2026, at the age of 74.

== Publications ==
- Dieu à notre service (1975)
- Au jardin de Dieu (1983)
- Ce Dieu inutile : éloge de la gratuité (1988)
- Une vie au souffle de l'Esprit (1995)
- Il est une foi, Valeurs et croyances des Belges (1996)
- Ces questions sur la foi que tout le monde se pose (1997)
- « Dites: Notre Père... » (1998)
- Les derniers des Mohicans ? : les catholiques en Belgique (1998)
- Mal, où est ta victoire ? (1999)
- Nouvelles questions sur la foi (2001)
- Apprendre à lire la Bible (2007)
- Sous le ciel étoilé (2009)
- Le sexe et le goupillon (2010)
- L’Essentiel du christianisme (2011)
- Le Grand ABC de la foi (2013)
- Quel homme pour demain ? : sciences, éthique, christianisme (2015)
- Petites et grandes histoire de Noël (2015)
- En vacances avec le pape François 2015 (2015)
- En vacances avec le pape François 2016 (2016)
- Trop envie de le dire (2017)
- Où allons-nous? De la modernité au transhumanisme (2018)
- Si je vous contais la foi (2021)
- Église catholique. Renaître ou disparaître (2022)

=== Youth books ===
- Dieu existe-t-il ? et 101 autres questions (2004)
- Tu peux changer le monde (2006)
- Jésus, qui est-il ? (2007)
- Tu peux croire à l’amour (2008)
- La prière, c’est facile (2008)
