= Sint-Truiden =

Sint-Truiden: Sintruin (Limburgish); Saint-Trond (French)
- City and municipality
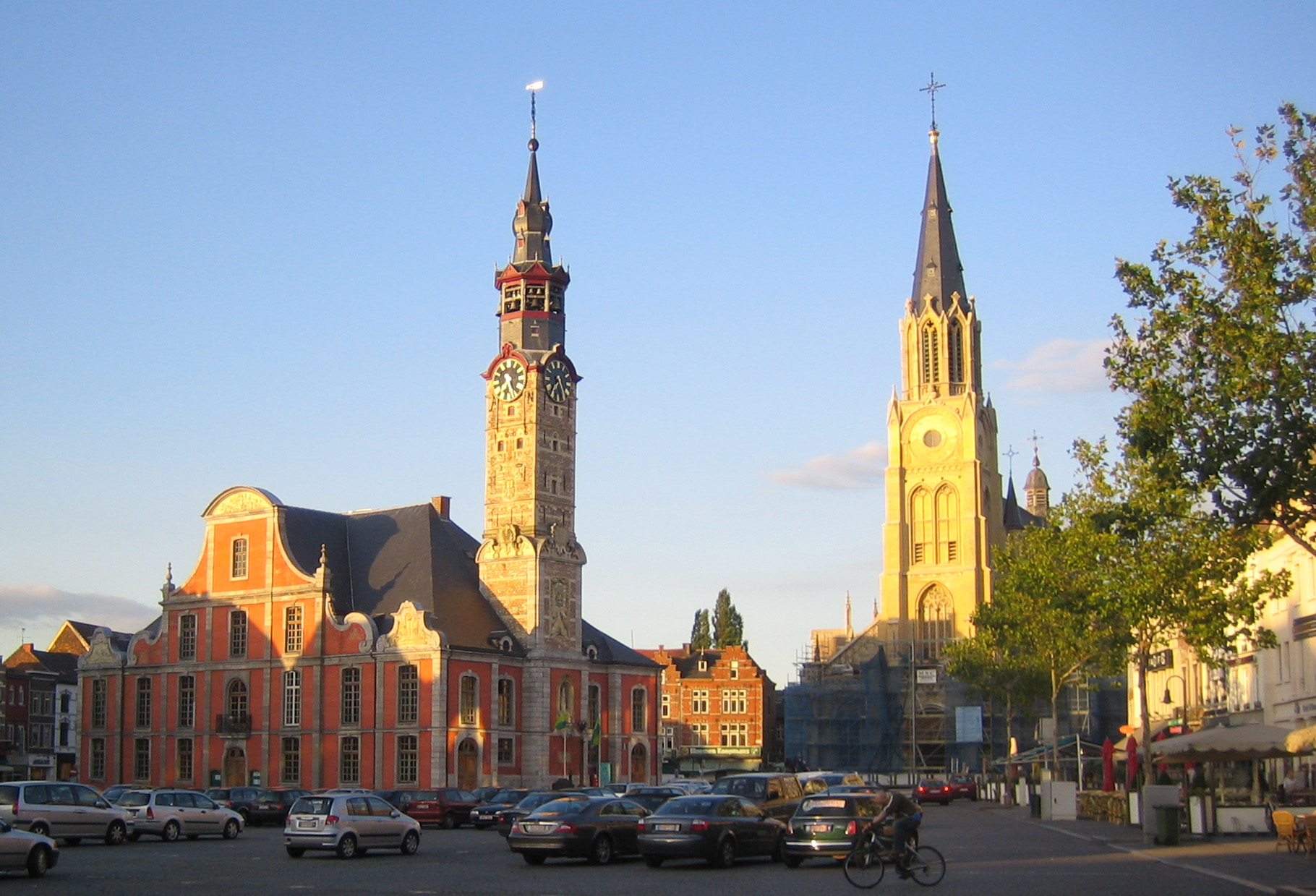
- Market Square with eighteenth-century City Hall, Church of Our Lady and abbey tower

- Flag Coat of arms

- Location of Sint-Truiden in Limburg
- Interactive map of Sint-Truiden
- Location in Belgium
- Coordinates: 50°48′N 05°11′E
- Country: Belgium
- Community: Flemish Community
- Region: Flemish Region
- Province: Limburg
- Arrondissement: Hasselt

Government
  - Mayor: Ludwig Vandenhove (Vooruit)
  - Governing parties: Vooruit, WOW, N-VA, Open VLD

Area
  - Total: 107.12 km^{2} (41.36 sq mi)

Population (2020-01-01)
  - Total: 40,672
  - Density: 379.69/km^{2} (983.38/sq mi)
- Postal codes: 3800, 3803, 3806
- NIS code: 71053
- Area codes: 011
- Website: www.sint-truiden.be

Sint-Truiden (Dutch pronunciation: [sɪnˈtrœydə(n)]; French: Saint-Trond [sɛ̃ tʁɔ̃]; Limburgish: Sintruin [sɪnˈtʀœjn]) is a city and municipality located in the province of Limburg, Flemish Region, Belgium. With more than 41,500 inhabitants, it is one of the largest cities in Limburg.

The municipality includes the former communes (now deelgemeenten) of Aalst, Brustem, Duras, Engelmanshoven, Gelinden, Gorsem, Groot-Gelmen, Halmaal, Kerkom-bij-Sint-Truiden, Melveren, Metsteren, Ordingen, Runkelen, Velm, Wilderen, and Zepperen.

The city is in the centre of Belgium's fruit-producing region, Haspengouw (Hesbaye), which is renowned for its pears, apples (Jonagold), and sweet cherries.

== History ==
=== Origins and Golden Age ===
The municipality developed around an abbey founded in the 7th century by St. Trudo, a Frankish nobleman. Legend has it that as a boy, Trudo was playing, building a small church with some rocks. When a woman scornfully kicked over the rocks, she was struck by sudden blindness. Trudo cured her from this blindness after she asked for his forgiveness. He also allegedly was able to find spring water and cure other illnesses.

After Trudo's death, the abbey (the later Sint-Truiden Abbey) became the centre of a pilgrimage. This brought pilgrims and wealth to the neighbouring town. The 11th century was a particularly prosperous period for the town, where the population grew markedly.

This was the time when abbot Adelardus, reporting to the prince-bishop of Metz, built the abbey's main church and two additional churches in town: Our Lady (Lievenvrouwenkerk) and Sint-Gangulfus. Under the abbot's direction, Sint-Truiden also received an earth wall surmounted by a wooden fence and fortified gates. A proper defensive stone wall, gates and towers, were built in 1129. The economy of this new oppidum city was based on the linen industry. In addition, it traded successfully with such foreign lands as England, Champagne, and Germany.

In the 13th century, the fortified town became one of the 23 bonnes villes (main cities) belonging to the Bishopric of Liège. A market hall was built at the site where the current city hall stands, the social life of the city was organized by the various guilds, and a perron was erected on the central square, symbolizing the local government's authority in political affairs.

=== 15th century until now ===
Charles the Bold captured the town in 1467, marking the beginning of a slow decline that lasted until the 19th century. The city's fortifications were dismantled in 1675, and many of the religious congregations were disbanded under the French regime at the end of the 18th century. After 1830, these empty buildings were turned into educational and medical facilities. The city was also the centre of a prosperous agricultural region, which from the end of the 19th century became well known for its fruit production.

It occupied an important strategical position with regard to the N.E. frontier of Belgium, and General Henri Alexis Brialmont recommended its fortification. On 9 August 1914, at the outset of Germany's invasion of Belgium, 20 civilians were executed and a number of houses destroyed. The reconstruction and building of brand new neighbourhoods accelerated well into the 20th century.

During World War II, its airfield was the base of one of the most famous Luftwaffe Night Fighter squadron, NJG1, with units II/NJG1 and IV/NJG1 operating Junkers Ju 88 and Heinkel He 219 aircraft from here in 1944. The highest scoring German night fighter pilot, Heinz-Wolfgang Schnaufer (121 air victories, most of them at night) was referred to as "The spook of St. Trond" by British Bomber crews that flew over Germany on night raids. The airport EBST is still in use.

== Transport ==
=== Air ===
The airport of Sint-Truiden, Limburg Regional Airport – EBST is PPR. It is a former Belgian Air Force Air Base and retains the long hard 06 – 24 runway, though only 1199 metres (3933 ft) is used.

Fuel (Jet A-1 and Avgas) is available. All is located in hangar 41 (turn right at the end of the runway when taxiing heading 06). Opening hours from 09:00 LT until sunset 7/7. There is also a flight school (airplane and helicopter) Fly One.

There are no scheduled flights.

=== Rail ===
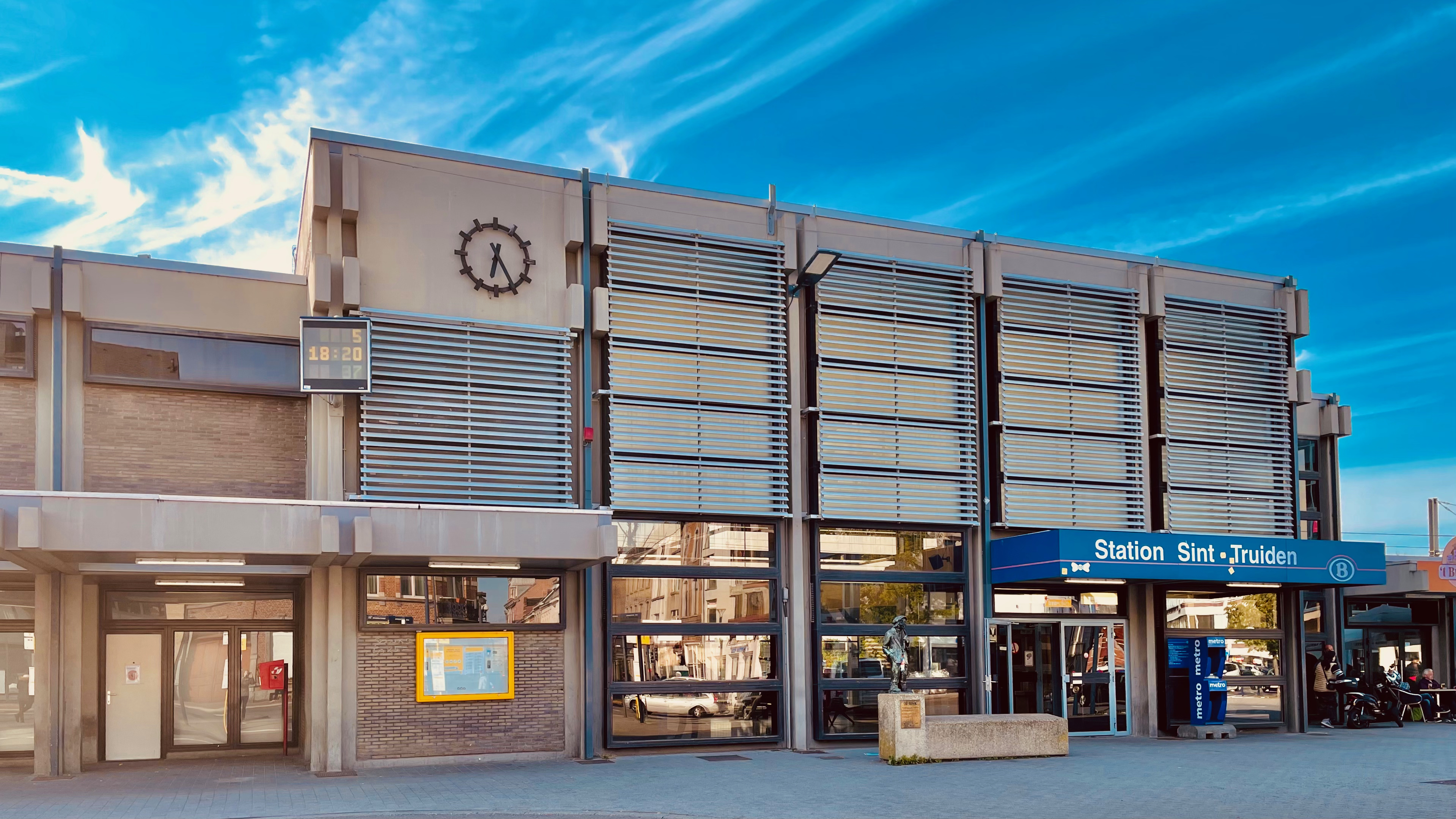
Sint-Truiden railway station

The town is served by Sint-Truiden railway station.

== Sports ==
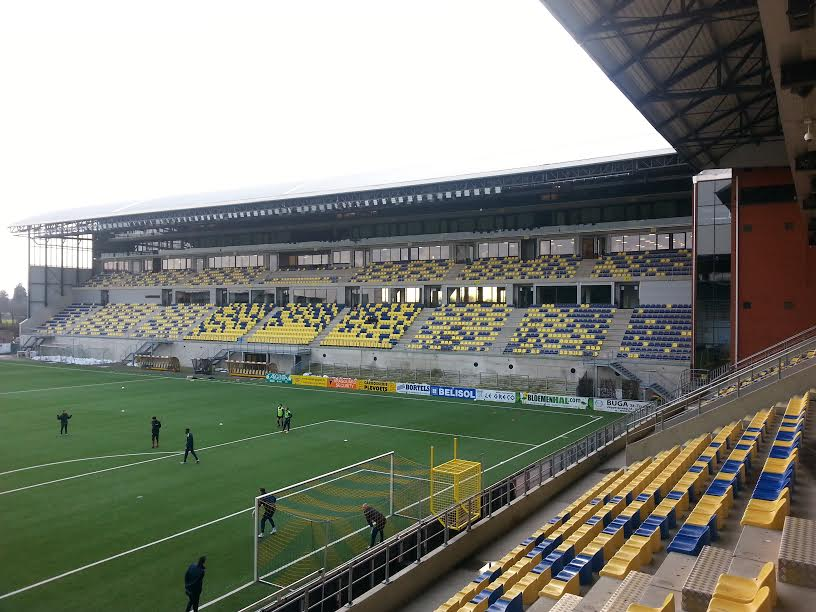
Stayen

The professional football club Sint-Truidense V.V. is based in Sint-Truiden. STVV plays in the highest division of Belgian football, the Pro League.

== Places of interest ==
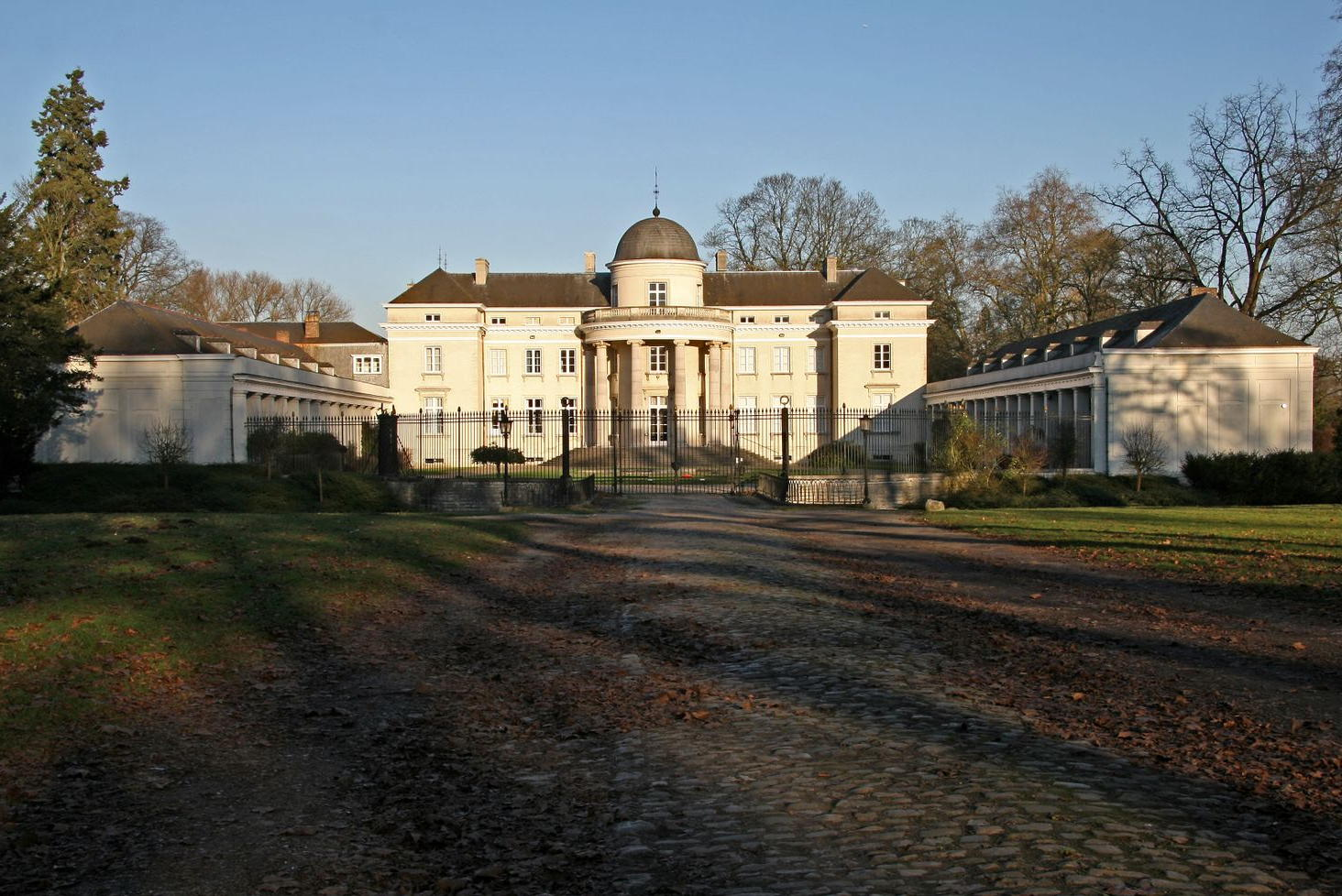
Duras castle

- Sint-Truiden's historical centre includes the town hall (Stadhuis), with a 17th-century belfry added by UNESCO to the World Heritage Site of Belfries of Belgium and France. The oldest parts of the building date from the 13th century.
- The 15th-century Church of Our Lady (Lievenvrouwenkerk) stands just beside the town hall.
- The béguinage of Sint-Agnes, with its 13th-century church, was also classified by UNESCO as a World Heritage Site of Flemish Beguinages.
- An 11th-century Romanesque tower and crypt are all that remain of the old abbey of St Trudo. Several other Romanesque buildings can also be visited in town: Sint-Pieterskerk, Sint-Gangulfuskerk, and the Guvelingen chapel.
- On the abbey square stands the statue of St Trudo which, together with a meridian line traced on the ground, also functions as a sundial.
- Sint-Truiden offers several good examples of Baroque architecture, including the gable of the town hall and the Minderbroederkerk.
- The military school KSOO Saffraanberg, the grounds of which include Rochemdaal Castly.

== Notable inhabitants ==
- Christina the Astonishing (1150–1224)
- Denis the Carthusian, theologian and mystic (1402–1471)
- Henri-Guillaume Hamal (1685–1752), musician and composer, maître de musique at Onze-Lieve-Vrouwekerk c. 1708–1712
- Barthélémy de Theux de Meylandt (born 26 February 1794), politician and former Belgian Prime Minister
- Aldous Huxley, English author (1894–1963), married Maria Nys from Sint-Truiden and briefly resided on the town's central square
- Désiré Collen (born 21 June 1943), physician and chemist
- Frank De Winne, astronaut, born in Ghent in 1961, but residing in Sint-Truiden since 1986
- Koen Vanmechelen (born 26 August 1965), artist
- Danny Boffin, football player (1965–)
- Ruud Boffin, football player
- Tina Bride (born 23 December 1977), musician and dancer
- Kristof Delorge (1986–2021), football player
- Simon Mignolet (born 6 August 1988), football player
- Tim Wellens (born 10 May 1991), cyclist
- Yorick Antheunis (born 26 June 1991), professional football player
- Nina Derwael (born 26 March 2000), gymnast
- Dimitri Van den Bergh (born 8 July 1994), professional darts player
- Wim Fissette (born 22 March 1980), tennis coach and former professional player

== Sister cities ==
Sint-Truiden is twinned with the following cities:

- Berkane, Morocco
- Duras, France
- Weert, Netherlands
- Nueva Guinea, Nicaragua
