= Daniël Theys =

Belgian glassmaker (born 1953, Leuven)

Daniël Theys (born 26 January 1953 in Holsbeek, Belgium) is a Belgian glassmaker. He usually works as a duo with his wife, Chris Miseur.

== Biography ==
He started his own glass studio in 1987, where he began by making stained glass windows. Later, he went to Murano in Italy to learn the traditional techniques of glass art. He currently has a large studio in Leuven, near Brussels, called "Belgian Glass Styling." His wife Chris Miseur came to share in his passion for glass and became a glass artist in 1990. Their son Daan Theys is following in their footsteps.

Many of his major life events can be found on his website, and have been translated from Dutch to below:

- 1987 – Starts full-time as a young independent stained-glass man and is skilled in making stained glass windows.
- 1987 – Take the stained glass lessons at the Municipal Academy in Hasselt with Amandus Van Rompay.
- 1988 – Specializes himself through self-study in various restoration techniques and works as a freelance for various major antique dealers.
- 1989 – Follows the first glass blowing workshop at the I.K.A. Mechelen under the direction of Miloslava Svobodova and Koen Vanderstukken.
- 1990 – Builds its own glass melting furnace on Rodeberg together with Vanderstukken and is specialized in glass blowing for five years.
- 2002–2005 – Enjoy the sculpture lessons with Roland Rens at the Municipal Academy in Aarschot.
- 2005 – Opens its own "THEYS & MISEUR" glass gallery in the Historical Center of Leuven

== Projects ==
He is best known for creating the largest stained glass window in Belgium. It may be seen at the church of "Onze Lieve Vrouw van Gedurige Bijstand" in Haacht. The glass-in-concrete measures 22 by 7 meters.

Projects by Daniël Theys
Project name (Dutch)	Project name (Translated to English)	Image of Project
De schepping	The Creature	
