= Børge Nyrop =

Danish painter (1881–1948)

Børge Christoffer Nyrop
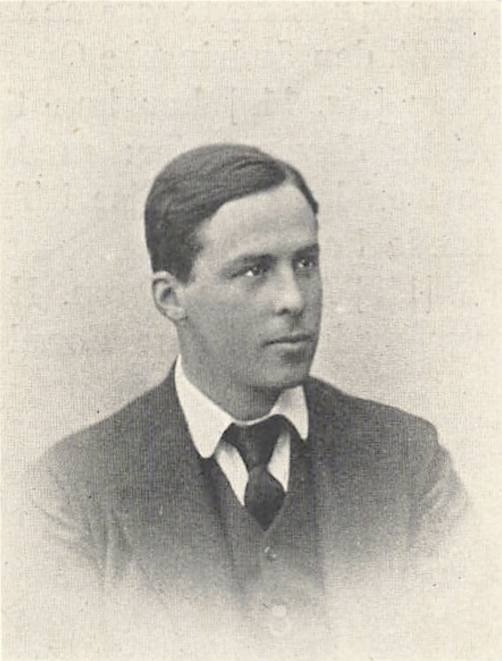
- Nyrop c. 1900
- Born: Børge Christoffer Nyrop; 15 January 1881; Copenhagen
- Died: 28 March 1948 (aged 67); Ghent
- Education: Royal Danish Academy of Fine Arts
- Years active: 1900–1948
- Known for: Painting
- Notable work: Paris in the Spring (1911)
- Movement: Impressionism

Signature
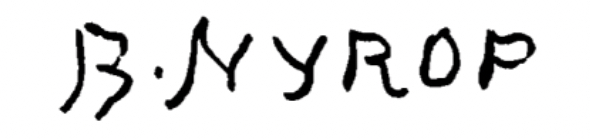

Børge Christoffer Nyrop (15 January 1881 – 15 March 1948) was a Danish painter. His works include landscapes, cityscapes and genre scenes.

== Biography ==
Nyrop was the son of the manufacturer Johan Ernst Nyrop. His great-uncle was Camillus Nyrop, a dealer in surgical instruments and artificial limbs. He is also related to Martin Nyrop, a Danish architect.

After finishing high school, he longed for an artistic career. First he apprenticed with painter Jens Møller-Jensen (1869–1948), whom he helped with the fresco in Copenhagen City Hall. He then attended the Royal Danish Academy of Fine Arts, from which he graduated in 1907.

In 1907 he received the Sødringske præmie and in 1911 the Neuhausenske præmier.

He travelled to Paris to study (1910–1911) under the French artist and teacher Lucien Simon.

Nyrop has been exhibited for more than thirty years at Kunsthal Charlottenborg (1907–1945).

== Work ==
Nyrop travelled extensively in Denmark, where he painted the landscapes of the west coast of Jutland. In addition to Denmark and France, he also travelled and worked in Italy, The Netherlands and Belgium.

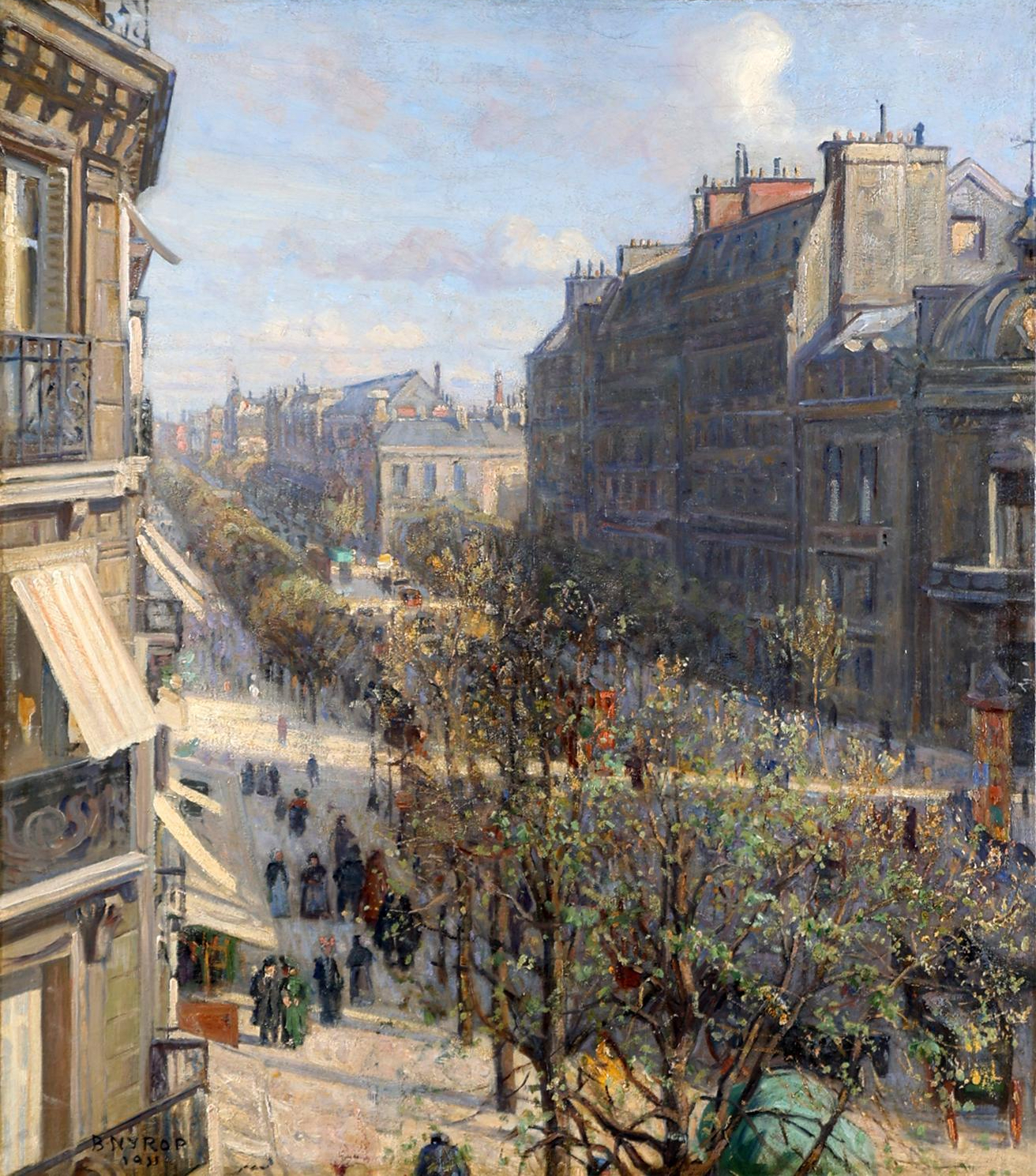
Paris in the Spring

His painting Paris in the Spring (1911) was sold at Christie's in London on 24 March 1988 (lot 128) for £12,100. Ten years later (24 June 1998, lot 235) this painting was sold at Sotheby's in London for £20,000. Christie's in Amsterdam offered the painting on 17 November 2009 (lot 125), estimating that it would fetch €25,000 to €35,000.

== Method ==
Nyrop is known for his technical skill and mastery of complex lighting effects. Especially in his early works one finds an interplay of light and color.

== Sources ==
- Emmanuel Bénézit - Dictionnaire des peintres, sculpteurs, dessinateurs et graveurs (1948–1955)
- Hans Vollmer - Allgemeines Lexikon der bildenden Künstler des XX. Jahrhunderts (1956)
