= Victor Albert =

Belgian politician

Personal details
- Born: 25 November 1943 (age 82)
- Died: 10 November 2005 (aged 62)

Victor Albert (25 November 1943 – 10 November 2005) was a Belgian politician. He was a member of the Chamber of Representatives.
