= Willy Vande Walle =

Belgian academic, Japanologist and Sinologist

Willy F. Vande Walle (born 21 November 1949) is a Belgian academic, author, Japanologist and Sinologist.

Willy Vande Walle was born in Roeselare, Belgium. His secondary education focused on classical humanities (Greek-Latin) at Klein Seminarie Roeselare (1962–1968). He studied Oriental Philology and History at the State University of Ghent and earned his doctoral degree in Oriental Philology in 1976.

== Career ==
Willy Vande Walle is Professor Emeritus of Japanese Studies at the Catholic University of Leuven (Katholieke Universiteit Leuven or KU Leuven) in Belgium. He taught several classes such as Japanese language and literature, history of Japan, art history of East Asia, as well as history of China and Chinese poetry. The KU Leuven coursework is supplemented with active Internet learning programs linked to Japanese educational partners.

Willy Vande Walle is the Belgian coordinator for projects conducted by the European Association of Japanese Studies.

== Honors ==
- Japan Foundation: Japan Foundation Special Prize, 2000.
- Order of the Rising Sun with Gold Rays and Neck Ribbon, 2006.
- Honorary Doctorate, Kansai University, 2009.

== Main publications ==
- 1987 – Stratification in Verbiest's Works: The Astronomia Europaea and the Memorials.
- 1989 – Takakura – Habits de la cour impériale du Japon / Keizerlijke gewaden uit Japan (with Muneyuki Sengoku). Brussels: Europalia Foundation International.
- 1989 – Splendeur du théâtre No / Luister van het No-theater (with Eileen Kato, Tomoyuki Yamanobe & Shozo Masuda). Brussels: Europalia Foundation International.
- 2001 – Dodonæus in Japan: Translation and the Scientific Mind in the Tokugawa Period (with Kazuhiko Kasaya). Leuven: Leuven University Press. ISBN 978-90-5867-179-0; OCLC 49539599 – simultaneously published in Kyoto: International Research Center for Japanese Studies. On Google Books.
- 2003 -- The History of the Relations Between the Low Countries and China in the Qing Era (1644-1911)] with Noël Golvers. Leuven Chinese Studies XIV. Leuven: Leuven University Press. ISBN 978-90-5867-315-2 On Google Books
- 2005 (as editor)-- Japan & Belgium: Four Centuries of Exchange. Brussels: Commissioners-General of the Belgian Government at the Universal Exposition of Aichi 2005, Japan.
