= Jean-Marie Berckmans =

Belgian writer (1953–2008)

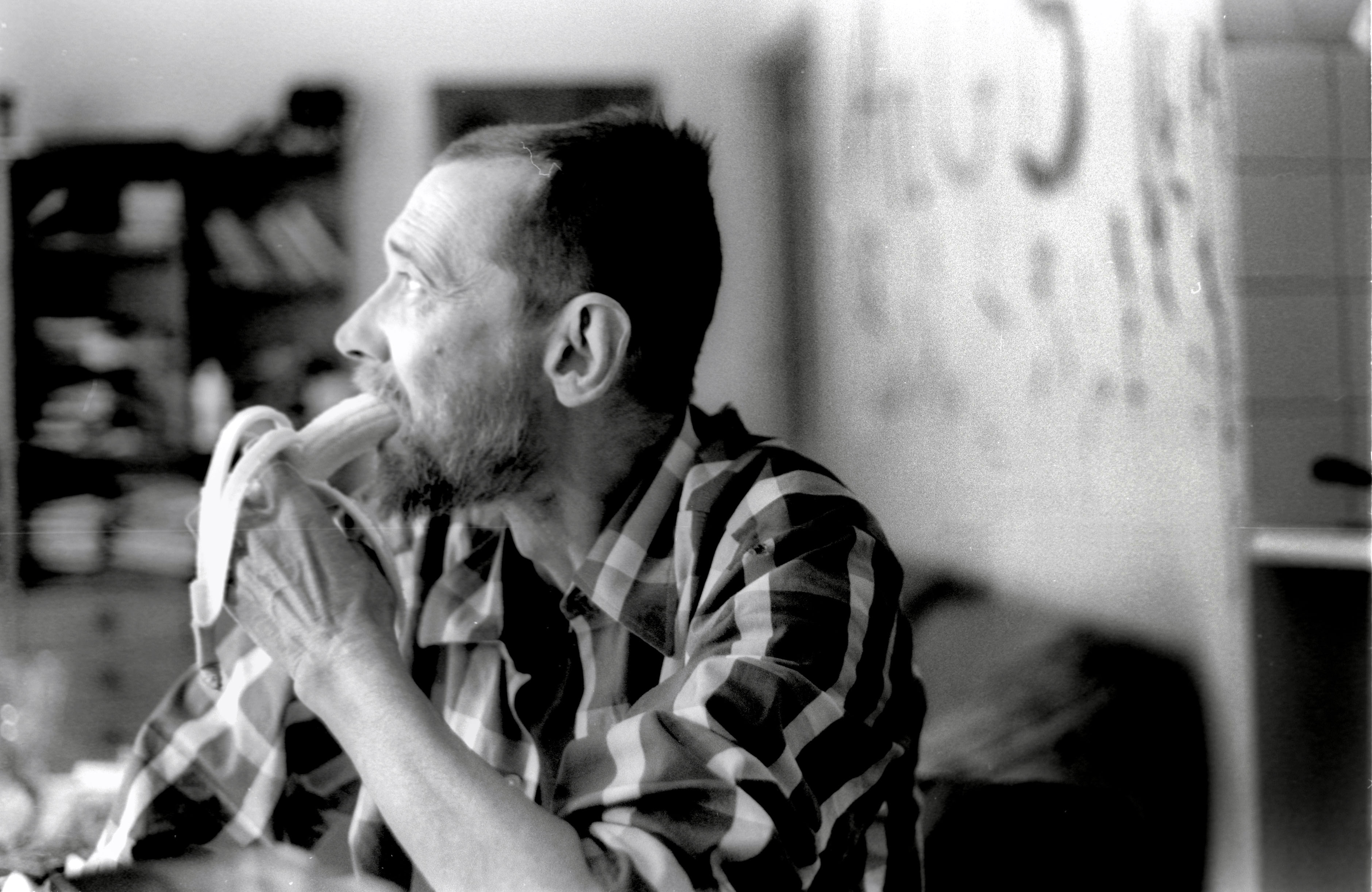
Jean-Marie Berckmans in Antwerp

Jean-Marie Henri Berckmans (28 October 1953, in Leopoldsburg – 31 August 2008, in Antwerp) was a Belgian cult writer.

Born in Leopoldsburg, Berckmans was a punk poet who struggled with mental illness. He left Belgium to become a businessman in Italy but he became manic. He then returned to Belgium where he resumed his literary career. His work has been compared with William S. Burroughs and Robert Crumb. Nicknamed Pafke, in reference to his chain-smoking habit, he often wrote about the night and people who lead a nocturnal existence. He died in 2008 due to his alcohol problems.

== Bibliography ==
- Geschiedenis van de revolutie (1977)
- Tranen voor Coltrane (1977)
- Vergeet niet wat de zevenslaper zei (1989)
- Café De Raaf nog steeds gesloten (1990)
- Rock & roll met Frieda Vindevogel (1991)
- Het zomert in barakstad (1993)
- Brief aan een meisje in Hoboken (1994)
- Taxi naar de Boerhaavestraat (1995)
- Bericht uit Klein Konstantinopel (1996)
- Ontbijt in het vilbeluik (1997)
- Slecht nieuws voor Doctor Paf de Pierennaaier, Pandemonium in de Grauwzone (1997)
- Berckmans' Biotoop (1999-2000)
- Na het baden bij Baxter en de ontluizing bij Miss Grace (2000)
- Het onderzoek begint (2002)
- As op Jazzwoensdag (2003)
- Je kan geen twintig zijn op suikerheuvel (2006)
- 4 Laatste verhalen en enige nagelaten brieven (2009)
- Barakstad https://www.pelckmansuitgevers.be/barakstad.html (2026)
