= Jean-Jacques Cassiman =

Belgian academic (1943–2022)

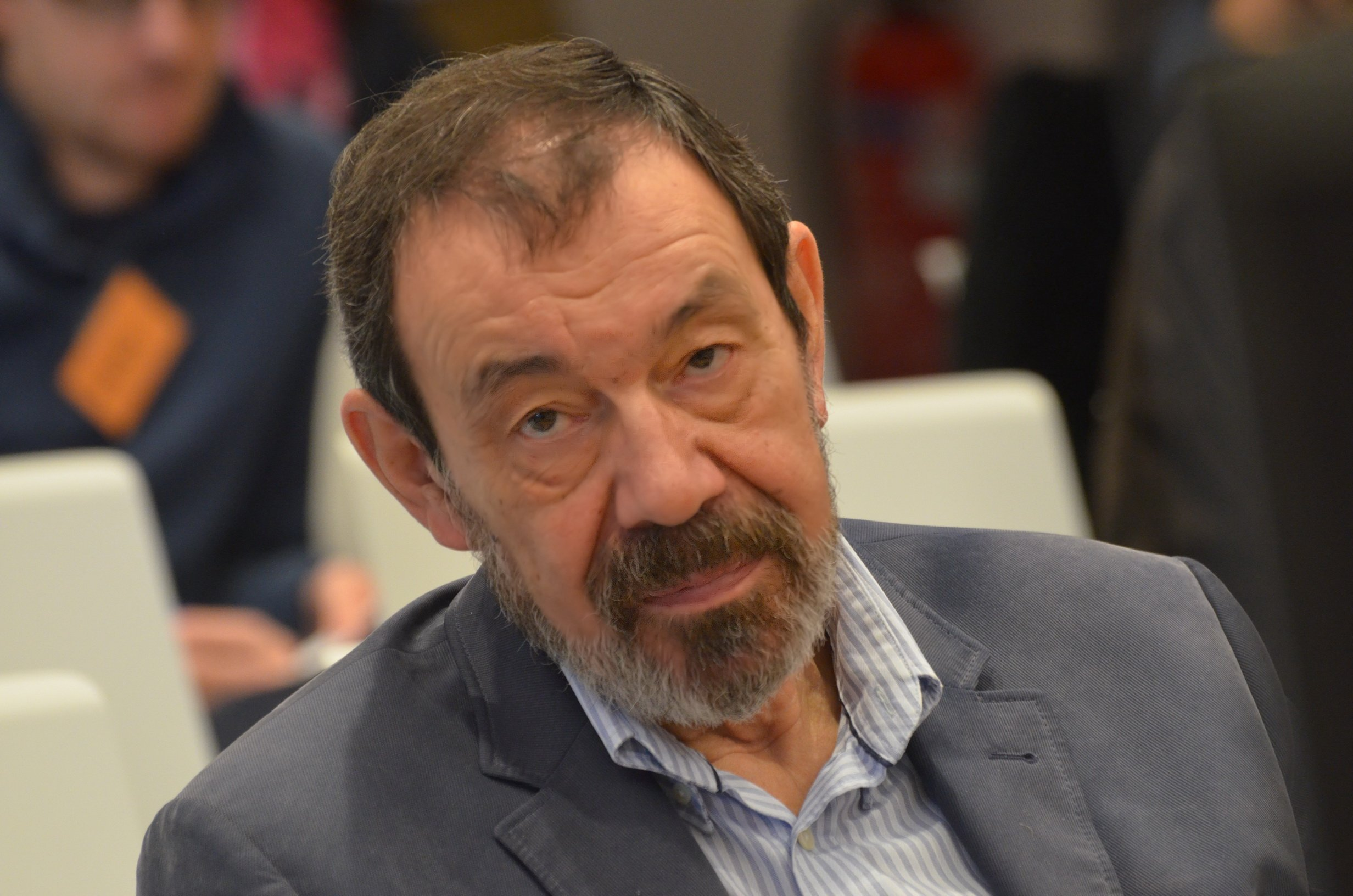
- Cassiman in 2014
- Born: 25 April 1943; Belgium
- Died: 5 August 2022 (aged 79)
- Occupations: Geneticist and professor

Jean-Jacques Cassiman (25 April 1943 – 5 August 2022) was a Belgian geneticist and professor of human genetics.

== Education and career ==
He graduated in 1967 from the Department of Medical Sciences of the Catholic University of Leuven and then did five years research on human genetics at Stanford University in the United States.

From 1976 to 1981 he was associate professor in the Department of Human Genetics in Leuven. In 1981 he became a full professor in the same department and he was head of the laboratory for human mutations and polymorphisms in the Centre for Human Genetics affiliated with the Catholic University of Leuven. In 1998 he became head of the centre.

Jean-Jacques Cassiman has done work in the field of human genetics and DNA research. In 1998 he received the Francqui chair at the University of Louvain (UCLouvain) and in 2002 he earned a PhD to Doctor Honoris Causa at the Iuliu Haţieganu University of Medicine and Pharmacy, Cluj-Napoca, Romania.

In 1998 Professor Cassiman proved through DNA testing that Karl Wilhelm Naundorff was not a descendant of the Bourbons and certainly not Louis XVII. In 2004 he proved that the heart that had been kept in Paris belonged to Louis XVII.

He was commissioned in 2004 by the French authorities to use DNA testing to detect if the mortal remains of Napoleon Bonaparte in Paris buried there is indeed that of Napoleon.

== Musical avocation ==
In the first half of the 1960s, he was a singer in the Trio Cassiman that he together with his brother Guido and his sister Emmy formed. The trio played folk music and negro spirituals, and was regularly seen on the Flemish podiums. When Jean-Jacques came to America after his studies, he ended his singing career, and kept his day job.

== Death ==
He died on 5 August at the age of 79.
