= Laar (disambiguation) =

Laar may refer to:

Places

- Laar, Germany
- Laar, Maasbree, Limburg, Netherlands
- Laar, Nuth, Limburg, Netherlands
- Laar, Weert, Limburg, Netherlands
- Laar, Cranendonck, North Brabant, Netherlands
- Laar, Nuenen, North Brabant, Netherlands
- Laar, Sint-Michielsgestel, North Brabant, Netherlands
- Laar, Vught, North Brabant, Netherlands
- Laar, Zemst-Laar, Flemish Brabant, Belgium

People

- Laar (surname)

LAAR may refer to:

Technology

- Light Attack/Armed Reconnaissance, or LAAR, a United States Air Force procurement program

Medicine

- Ligue Algérienne Antirhumatismale (Algerian League Against Rheumatism), or LAAR, an Algerian association in the field of rheumatology

== See also ==
- Lahr
