= Perlenbach =

Perlenbach may refer to:

- Perlenbach (Rur), a river of North Rhine-Westphalia, Germany, tributary of the Rur
  - Perlenbach Valley, the valley of the Perlenbach
  - Perlenbach-Fuhrtsbachtal, a nature reserve
- Perlenbach (Schwesnitz), a river of Bavaria, Germany, headstream of the Schwesnitz
