= Lahr (disambiguation) =

Lahr may refer to:

== Places ==
- Lahr/Schwarzwald, a town in Baden-Württemberg
  - Canadian Forces Base Lahr, now known as Black Forest Airport, a former military airport located in Lahr
- Lahr, Bitburg-Prüm, a municipality in the district Bitburg-Prüm, Rhineland-Palatinate
- Hüttingen bei Lahr, a municipality in the district of Bitburg-Prüm, in Rhineland-Palatinate
- Lahr (Hunsrück), a municipality in the district Rhein-Hunsrück-Kreis, Rhineland-Palatinate
- Burglahr, a municipality in the district of Altenkirchen, in Rhineland-Palatinate
- Laer, a German municipality in the district of Steinfurt, in North Rhine-Westphalia

== Other uses ==
- Lahr (surname)

== See also ==
- Lars, common name
- Laar (disambiguation) (Dutch form)
