= Chronology of the liberation of Belgian cities and towns during World War II =

Locations of:
- La Glanerie, the first settlement to be liberated according to Notele
- Forge-Philippe, the first settlement to be liberated according to the Belgian Government Information Center
- Krewinkel, last settlement to be liberated.

This is a chronological overview of the dates at which the liberation by the Allies in World War II took place of a number of Belgian cities and towns.

== Table ==
Date	Location	Notes	Reference
2 September 1944	La Glanerie	First settlement to be liberated, according to the Belgian news site Notele. An American motorcyclist arrived in the village after unknowingly crossing the Belgian border, and later returned with his battalion to liberate the village.	
2 September 1944	Forge-Philippe	First settlement to be liberated, according to the Belgian Government Information Center.	
2 September 1944	Mons	Battle of the Mons pocket	
2 September 1944	Tournai		
3 September 1944	Halle		
3 September 1944	Aalst		
3 September 1944	Geraardsbergen		
3 September 1944	Zottegem		
3 September 1944	Brussels	Belgium's largest city and de jure capital. The allied liberation of this city allowed the Belgian government in exile to return to the country on 8 September.	
3 September 1944	Ronse		
3 September 1944	Ath		
3 September 1944	La Louvière		
3 September 1944	Ronse		
3 September 1944	Aalst		
3 September 1944	Ninove		
3 September 1944	Liedekerke		
3 September 1944	Herne		
3 September 1944	Gooik		
3 September 1944	Asse		
3 September 1944	Leest		
3 September 1944	Grimbergen		
4 September 1944	Waterloo		
4 September 1944	Buggenhout		
4 September 1944	Oosterzele		
4 September 1944	Wetteren		
4 September 1944	Ename		
4 September 1944	Antwerp		
4 September 1944	Edegem		
4 September 1944	Sint-Katelijne-Waver		
4 September 1944	Leuven	Battle of Leuven (1944)	
4 September 1944	Mouscron		
4 September 1944	Mechelen		
4 September 1944	Lier		
4 September 1944	Kortrijk		
4 September 1944	Breendonk		
4 September 1944	Avelgem		
4 September 1944	Beervelde		
4 September 1944	Zeveneken		
4 September 1944	Lochristi		
4 September 1944	Kapelle-op-den-Bos		
4 September 1944	Ternat		
4 September 1944	Willebroek		
4 September 1944	Mariakerke		
4 September 1944	Dendermonde		
4 September 1944	Nijlen		
4 September 1944	Boom		
4 September 1944	Bertem		
4 September 1944	Affligem		
5 September 1944	Waregem		
5 September 1944	Oudenaarde		
5 September 1944	Haacht		
5 September 1944	Heist-op-den-Berg		
5 September 1944	Aarschot		
5 September 1944	Kortenaken		
5 September 1944	Eppegem		
5 September 1944	Zemst		
5 September 1944	Tervuren		
5 September 1944	Walshoutem		
6 September 1944	Eindhout		
6 September 1944	Bilzen		
6 September 1944	Vorst		
6 September 1944	Veerle		
6 September 1944	Zaffelare		
6 September 1944	Ingelmunster		
6 September 1944	Ghent		
6 September 1944	Namur		
6 September 1944	Charleroi		
6 September 1944	Herselt		
6 September 1944	Meldert		
6 September 1944	Beauvechain		
6 September 1944	Diest		
6 September 1944	Beringen		
6 September 1944	Geetbets		
6 September 1944	Schulen		
6 September 1944	Berbroek		
6 September 1944	Alken		
6-9 September 1944	Deinze		
7 September 1944	Bovelingen		
7 September 1944	Donk		
7 September 1944	Herk-de-Stad		
7 September 1944	Schakkebroek		
7 September 1944	Gavere		
7 September 1944	Hasselt		
7 September 1944	Ypres		
7 September 1944	Wavre		
7 September 1944	Huy		
7 September 1944	Tienen		
7 September 1944	Glabbeek		
7 September 1944	Verviers		
7 September 1944	Mopertingen		
7 September 1944	Kortessem		
8 September 1944	Liège		
8 September 1944	Ooigem		
8 September 1944	Roeselare		
8 September 1944	Hooglede		
8 September 1944	Marche-en-Famenne		
8 September 1944	Tielt		
8 September 1944	Ruiselede		
8 September 1944	Aalter		
8 September 1944	Jodoigne		
8 September 1944	Wingene		
8 September 1944	Oostkamp		
8 September 1944	Sint-Truiden		
8 September 1944	Tongeren		
8 September 1944	As		
8 September 1944	Wihogne		
8-9 September 1944	Assenede		
9 September 1944	Lokeren		
9 September 1944	Viersel		
9 September 1944	Punt	On this day, the allies launched an offensive to breach the Albert Canal in this area, successfully capturing bridgeheads at Punt and north of Stelen.	
9 September 1944	Ostend		
10 September 1944	Verviers		
10 September 1944	Arlon		
10 September 1944	Riemst		
10 September 1944	Poiel	On this day, the allies advanced to unite their bridgeheads at Punt and north of Stelen before proceeding north. In doing so, they liberated these four settlements. The Germans recaptured Geel on the following day.	
10 September 1944	Doornboom	On this day, the allies advanced to unite their bridgeheads at Punt and north of Stelen before proceeding north. In doing so, they liberated these four settlements. The Germans recaptured Geel on the following day.	
10 September 1944	Wilders	On this day, the allies advanced to unite their bridgeheads at Punt and north of Stelen before proceeding north. In doing so, they liberated these four settlements. The Germans recaptured Geel on the following day.	
10 September 1944	Geel	On this day, the allies advanced to unite their bridgeheads at Punt and north of Stelen before proceeding north. In doing so, they liberated these four settlements. The Germans recaptured Geel on the following day.	
11 September 1944	Houthalen-Helchteren		
11 September 1944	Leopoldsburg		
11 September 1944	eupen		
11 September 1944	Lommel		
11 September 1944	Peer		
11 September 1944	Visé		
11 September 1944	Aubel		
11 or 12 September 1944	Voeren	With the capture of this municipality by the American 30th Infantry Division, the allies had reached the Belgium–Netherlands border and crossed into the Netherlands. Hence, neighbouring Mesch became the first Dutch village to be liberated on 12 September.	
12 September 1944	Malmedy	First liberation of this city; was later recaptured by German forces during the Battle of the Bulge. See also: Malmedy massacre	
12 September 1944	Bruges		
12 September 1944	Eisden		
12 September 1944	Adegem		
12 September 1944	Oedelem		
12 September 1944	Beernem		
12 September 1944	Knesselare		
12 September 1944	Sijsele		
12 September 1944	Hechtel-Eksel		
12 September 1944	Kelmis		
13 September 1944	Geel	Second liberation of this city; was recaptured by German forces two days prior. See Battle of Geel	
13 September 1944	Zittaart	In the night of 12 to 13 September, German forces withdrew from their defensive positions along this section of the Albert Canal, allowing the allies to bloodlessly capture this settlement the next morning.	
13 September 1944	Winterslag		
13 September 1944	Mol		
13 September 1944	Dudzele		
13 September 1944	Berlare		
14 September 1944	Ten Aard	The allies breached the Bocholt–Herentals Canal in this area, but failed to break out of the bridgehead at this village and withdrew south in the night of 20–21 September. The Germans retreated from this village the following day, leaving the destroyed village a no-man's land.	
14 September 1944	Stekene		
14 September 1944	Beveren		
14 September 1944	Hamme		
14 September 1944	Gruitrode		
14 September 1944	Genk		
14 September 1944	Lanaken		
15 September 1944	Eeklo		
15 September 1944	Sint-Niklaas		
15 September 1944	Balgerhoeke		
15 September 1944	Sleidinge		
15 September 1944	Herentals		
15 September 1944	Maldegem		
16 September 1944	Wachtebeke		
16 September 1944	Moerbeke		
16 September 1944	Kaprijke		
16 September 1944	Kasteel De Maat (51.23732°N 5.18548°E)	On 23 September, the allies breached the canal near this place.	
17 September 1944	Bocholt		
17 September 1944	Kaulille		
19-21 September 1944	Bree		
20 September 1944	Hamont-Achel		
22 September 1944	Schilde		
23 September 1944	Malle		
24 September 1944	Dessel		
24 September 1944	Arendonk		
24 September 1944	Turnhout		
24 September 1944	Retie		
24 September 1944	Gierle		
25 September 1944	Kinrooi		
25 September 1944	Maaseik		
29 September 1944	Merksplas		
29 September 1944	Sint-Lenaarts		
1 October 1944	Brecht		
2 October 1944	Damme		
2-4 October 1944	Schoten	The allies breached the Albert Canal in this area.	
3 October 1944	Merksem	When the allies entered Antwerp on 4 September, the inhabitants of this district expected the allies to relieve the German occupation in a matter of hours and plundered the locality. However, allied advance halted at the Albert Canal, leaving the district under German occupation for the rest of September. Only after the canal was breached at Schoten on 2 October could this district be liberated.	
3 October 1944	Brasschaat		
3 October 1944	Ravels		
3 October 1944	Poppel		
4 October 1944	Kapellen		
4 October 1944	Hoevenen		
7 October 1944	Putte		
7-22 October 1944	Kalmthout	Advance in this settlement was very gradual due to heavy German resistance.	
16 October 1944	Watervliet		
20 October 1944	Wuustwezel	First liberation of this settlement; was recaptured by German forces the next day.	
22 October 1944	Wuustwezel	Second liberation of this settlement.	
22 October 1944	Nieuwmoer		
22 October 1944	Essen-Hoek		
22 October 1944	Essen		
23 October 1944	Hoogstraten		
1 November 1944	Westkapelle		
2 November 1944	Heist-aan-Zee		
2 November 1944	Ramskapelle		
3 November 1944	Knokke	The capture of these two settlements concluded Operation Switchback.	
3 November 1944	Zeebrugge	The capture of these two settlements concluded Operation Switchback.	
8 January 1945	Malmedy	Second liberation of this city; was earlier recaptured by German forces during the Battle of the Bulge.	
23 January 1945	St. Vith	Second liberation of this city; was earlier recaptured by German forces on 16–21 December 1944 during the Battle of the Bulge.	
4 February 1945	Krewinkel	Last settlement to be liberated.	

== Sources ==
- Belgian Government Information Center (1946). The Liberation of Belgium. New York: Belgian Government Information Center. OCLC 4251364.
