= Perlenbach-Fuhrtsbachtal =

Nature reserve in North Rhine-Westphalia, Germany

Coordinates: 50.5256°N 6.2564°E

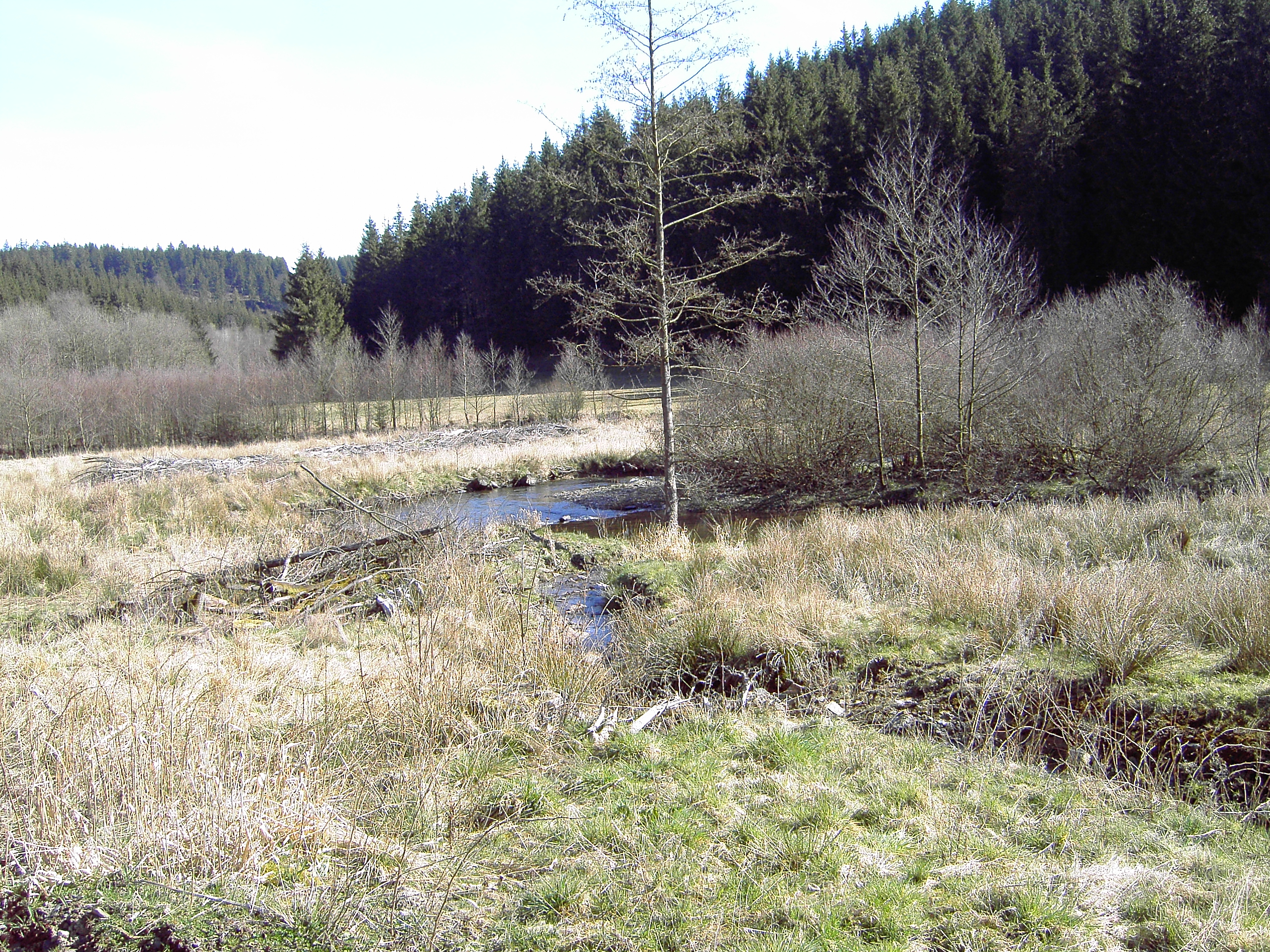
Perlenbach in April

The Perlenbach-Fuhrtsbachtal nature reserve is a 331 hectare reserve in the Aachen region, in the south west corner of North Rhine-Westphalia, Germany. It is characterised by fen vegetation and wet grassland zones with sedge and reed beds. It is situated at a height of 465–615 metres (1,526–2,018 ft) above sea level at Monschau, west of Kalterherberg and south of Höfen (two districts of Monschau) and thus forms part of the Monschauer-Hellentaler forest plateau. The area includes two river valleys, the Perlenbach and Fuhrtsbach.

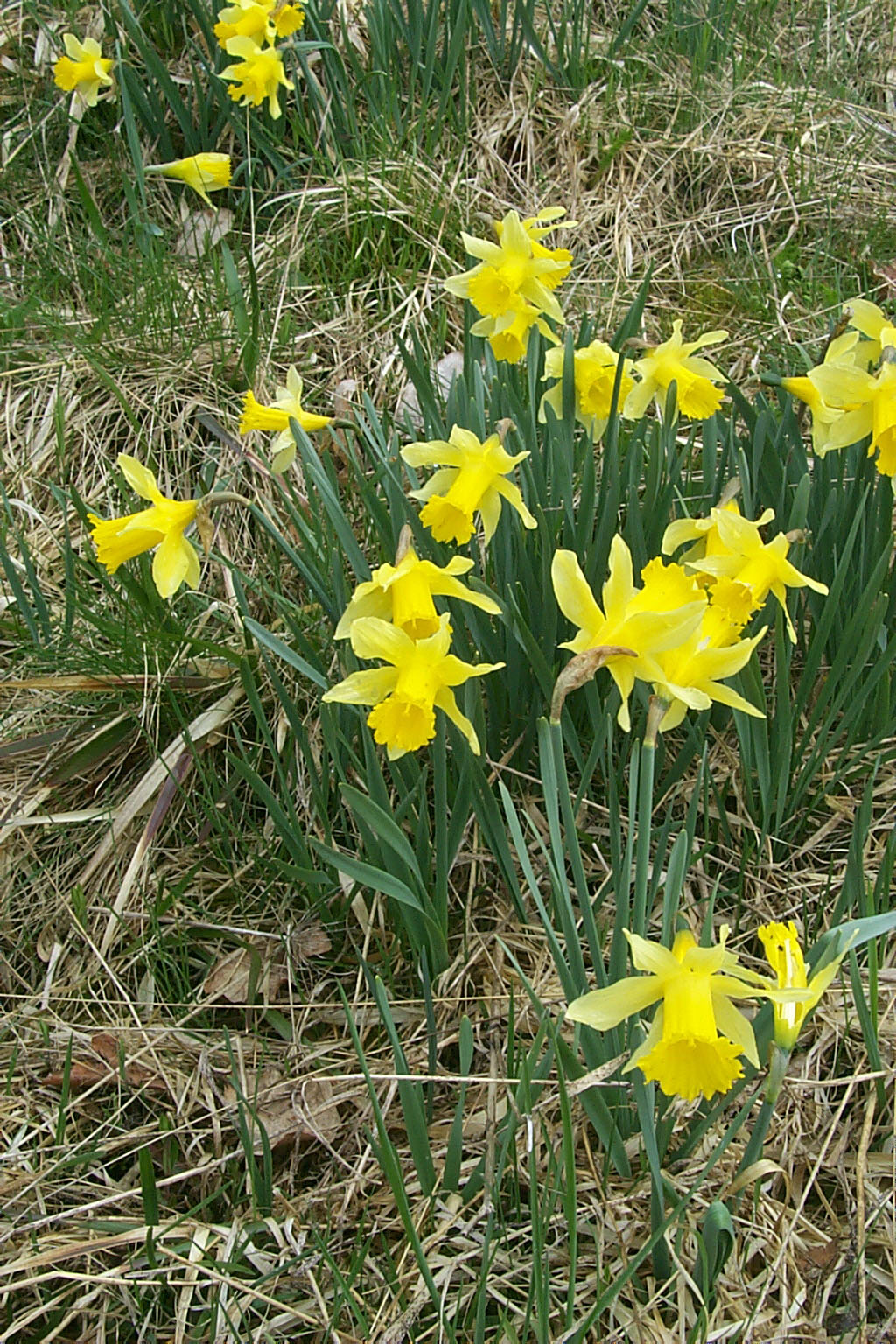
Narcissi blooming in the Perlenbach valley

The reserve is noted for the daffodils that bloom there in the spring from late March to mid-May, a major tourist attraction. It is estimated that ten million native plants of Narcissus pseudonarcissus grow there.

== Sources ==
"Perlenbach- und Fuhrtsbachtal bei Höfen: Narzissenreiche Bachtäler in der Westeifel" (in German). Nordrhein-Westfalen-Stiftung. Archived from the original on 29 April 2015.
