= Het Zwartland =

Hamlet of Zemst-Bos, Belgium

Coordinates: 50°58′30″N 4°24′55″E

Het Zwartland is a hamlet of the village Zemst-Bos, in Flemish Brabant, Belgium. It is part of the municipality of Zemst.

== Name ==
Its name literally means The Blackland. This is because the ground is darker and more fertile than in the rest of the region.

== Gallery ==
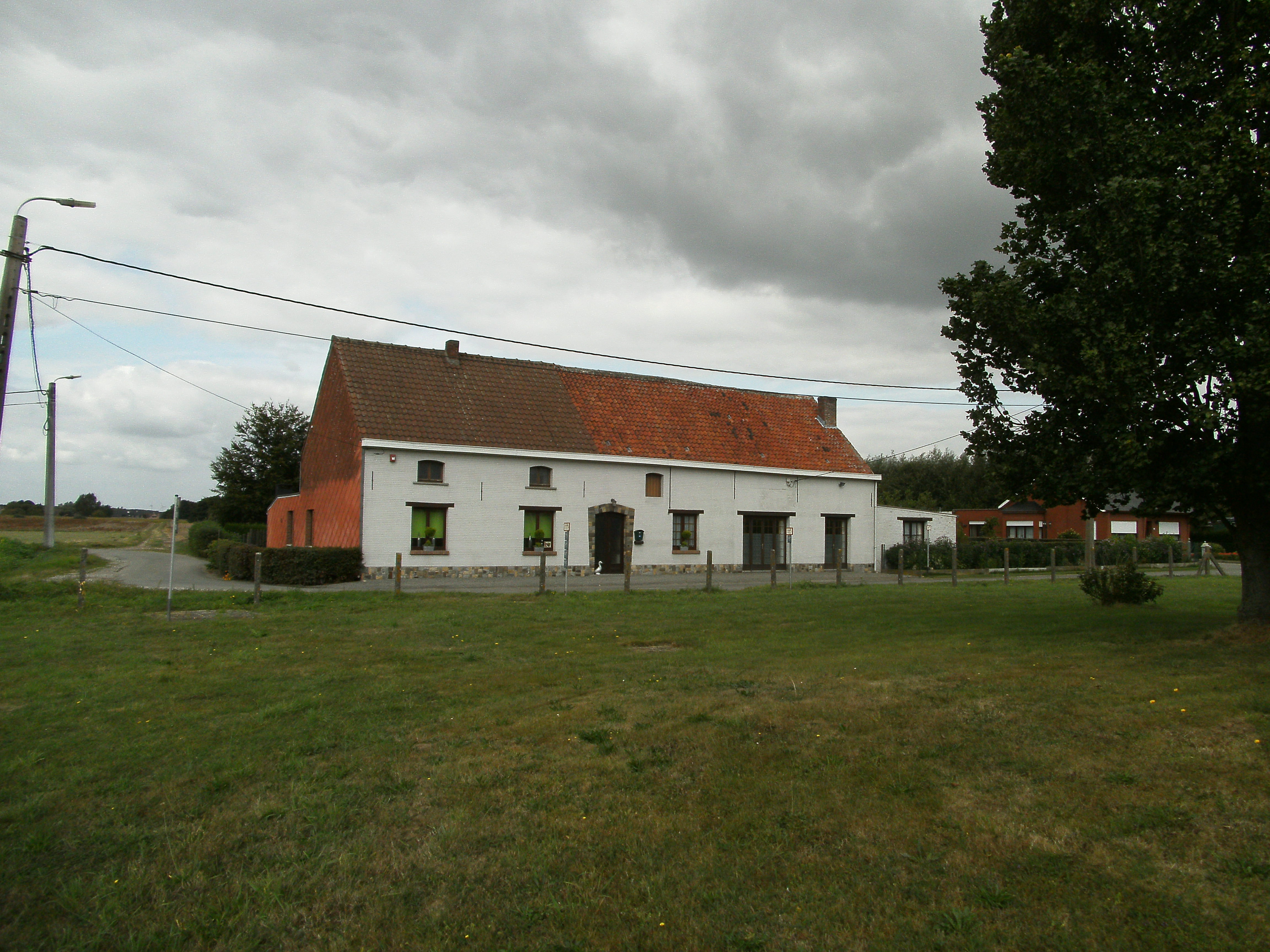
The Zwartlandhoeve, an 18th century former farm.

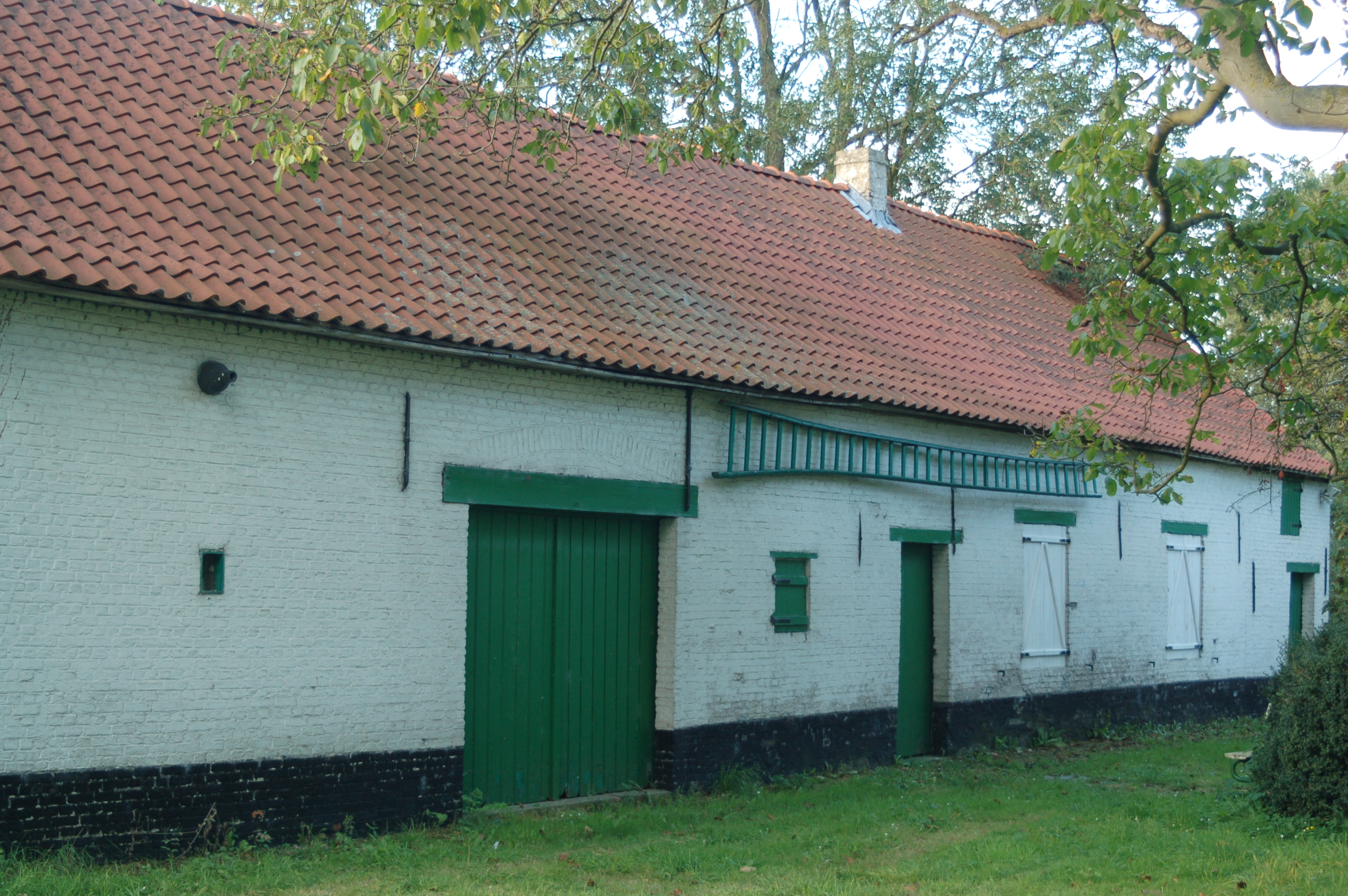
The Sooikesikhoeve, a 19th century former farm.
