= Weerde =

Village in Flemish Brabant, Belgium

Coordinates: 50.97198°N 4.4798°E

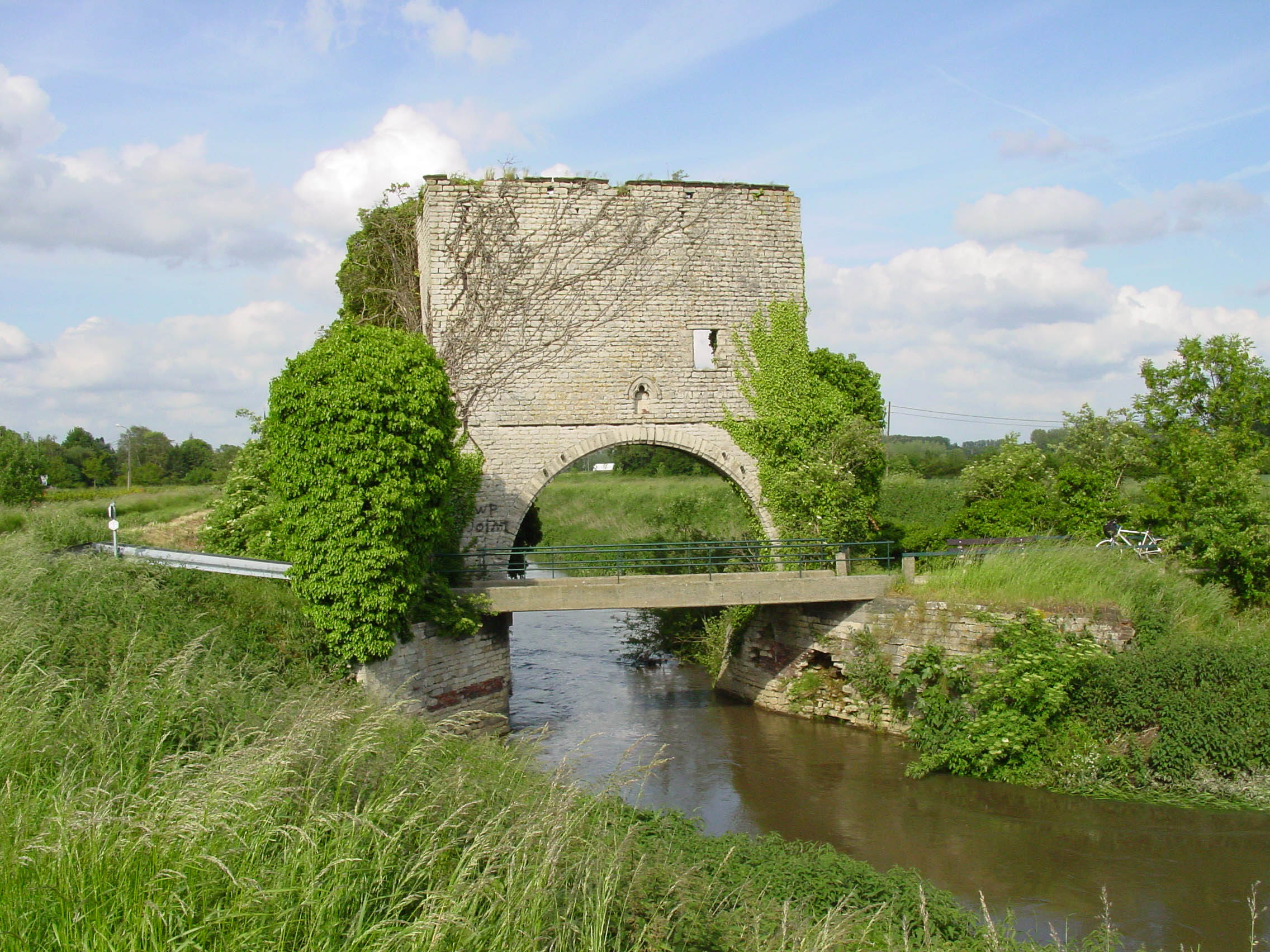
Remains of the sluice tower and gateway in the fields of Weerde

Weerde is a village in Flemish Brabant, Belgium. It is part of the municipality of Zemst. A train station is located in Weerde, connecting the two largest cities of the country, Brussels and Antwerp.

The location of Weerde today is between two branches of the river Zenne. The old branch flows to the east, past the Weerde fish pond, while the new branch was built to the west of the town between the world wars to protect Weerde from flooding.

To the south of Weerde, the remains of a medieval sluice tower and gateway can be seen in the fields, on the course of the old branch of the Zenne. The sluice was used to control the flow of water past the neighbouring watermill.

History: While World War I, after the Battle of Marne the Belgian Army launched an attack, by September 13 1914, hoping to force the Germans back, the attack finally failed.

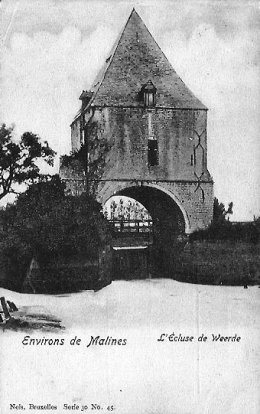
The sluice tower seen in about 1910
