= Liberation of Belgium =

1944 attainment of Belgium's sovereignty

- Part of the Allied advance from Paris to the Rhine in World War II
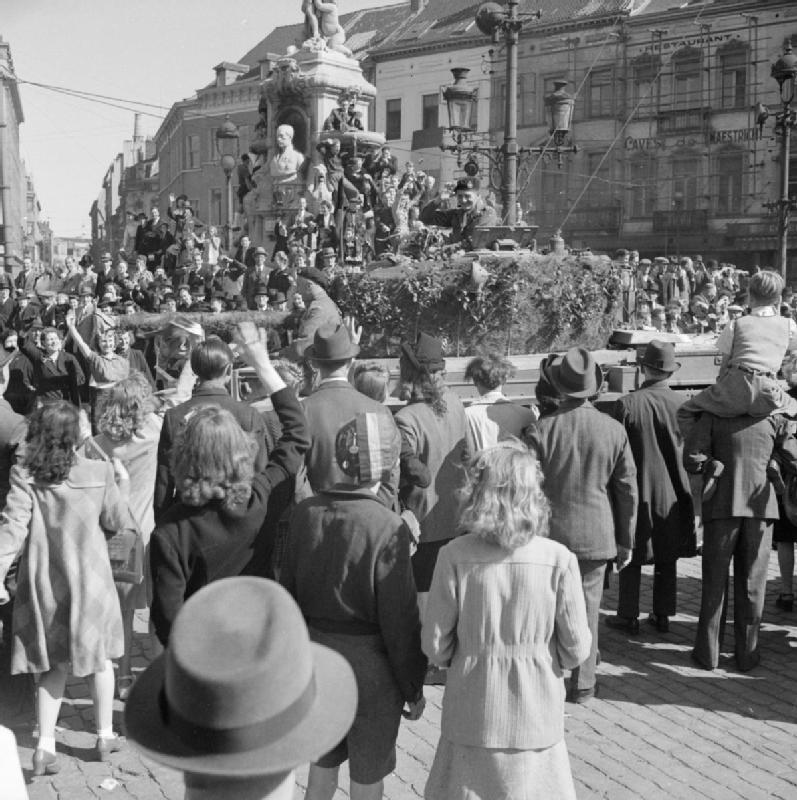
- British tanks arrive in Brussels on 4 September 1944, ending the German occupation.
| Date | 2 September 1944 – 4 February 1945 |
| Location | Belgium |
| Result | Allied victory |
| Territorial changes | Belgium liberated from German occupation |

Belligerents
| United Kingdom; United States; Canada; Poland; Belgium (Dutch government-in-exile) Netherlands | Germany |

Commanders and leaders
| Bernard Montgomery; Omar Bradley | Adolf Hitler; Walter Model |

Units involved
| 21st Army Group; 1st US Army | Army Group B |

Strength
| 600,000 (U.S.) | |

Casualties and losses
| 81,000 (U.S.); 20,000 (BR); 6,000 (CAN) | 100,000 (Germany) |

The Liberation of Belgium from German occupation began on 2 September 1944 when Allied forces entered the province of Hainaut and was completed on 4 February 1945 with the liberation of the village of Krewinkel. The liberation came after four years of German-occupied rule. The Belgian government was returned to power on 8 September 1944 after Allied forces had captured Brussels four days earlier.

== Operation begins ==
The liberation began with 21st Army Group heading eastwards from the breakout from Falaise. Units of XXX Corps, including the 2nd Canadian Division entered Belgium on 2 September. Forge-Philippe, located on the French border, was the first settlement to be liberated, although La Glanerie also claims that honor.

On the evening of 2 September Brian Horrocks briefed officers of the Guards Armoured Division in Douai that their objective for the following day would be Brussels, 110 km further east. The announcement was greeted with "delighted astonishment". The Division suffered casualties on their drive into Belgium but with the Germans still in disarray after their defeat at Falaise, the Household Cavalry on the British left and the Grenadier Guards on the right led the way with the Welsh and Irish Guards following close behind.

People in the Belgian capital had not expected to be liberated that soon, and huge crowds greeted and slowed the liberators. As Brussels was being liberated, an attempt by the Germans to deport 1,600 political prisoners and Allied prisoners of war from Brussels to concentration camps in Germany via the Nazi ghost train was thwarted by Belgian railway workers and the Belgian resistance.

The Welsh Guards advanced from Douai on 3 September crossing into Belgium with minimal resistance until they met some at Halle, but they pressed on that day to Brussels. The British Second Army captured Antwerp, the port city on the river Scheldt in northern Belgium, close to the Netherlands, on 4 September. In the following days and weeks, the Battle of the Scheldt claimed many lives, as the port of Antwerp could not be operated effectively without control of the Scheldt estuary. Antwerp was the first port to be captured by the Allies in near perfect condition, making it very valuable, especially with its deep water facilities. On 6 September, the 4th Canadian Armoured Division crossed the border with Belgium and took areas around Ypres and Passchendaele.

After the capture of Brussels the Germans formed a defensive line in the municipality of Hechtel. There they held against the Welsh Guards, in what is known as the Battle of Hechtel, until 12 September, when the Irish Guards made a flanking maneuver, capturing Bridge number 9 (Joe's Bridge), and isolating the Germans.

== Ghent Canal ==
Between 9 and 11 September, the 1st Polish Armoured Division attempted to capture control of the Ghent Canal, which resulted in heavy losses for the Poles after they had run into fierce resistance over difficult terrain. Further up the river, 3 miles (5 kilometres) south of Bruges, the 4th Canadian Armoured Division launched an offensive on 8 September and broke through two days later, after coming under heavy mortar fire. A narrow river crossing was opened and extended slowly due to heavy enemy resistance.

== The Ardennes ==
The First United States Army, under General Courtney Hodges, captured areas south of Brussels in early September 1944. The U.S. units were spread very thinly from south of Liège, through the Ardennes and into Luxembourg, leaving their defensive line lightly reinforced. Between September and 16 December, the Ardennes Forest was the "quiet sector"—the Americans used this area to rest tired units.

Adolf Hitler launched Germany's last offensive of the Western Front on 16 December, known as the Battle of the Bulge. He intended to push through the Ardennes Forest with the 6th Panzer Division advancing and capturing the coastal town of Antwerp. The Fifth Panzer Army, under German general Hasso von Manteuffel, was to attack the U.S. forces in the region, and the 7th German Army was to attack to the south to cut off supplies and create a buffer zone.

On the morning of the 16 December, a two-hour German artillery bombardment startled the Allies. When the German forces attacked, it was foggy, and the Allies could not use their air superiority to resupply ground units. On 18 December, after advancing 60 miles (97 kilometres) in two days, the Germans reached a point of stalemate. By the 22nd, the weather had cleared, allowing the Allies to be resupplied. Vicious fighting followed and ended in mid-January, when the German tank units began to run out of fuel.

The battle ended with the Germans in full retreat. 600,000 U.S. troops were involved in the battle, which made it the largest ground battle that the U.S. Army has ever fought: 81,000 U.S. troops were killed or wounded. Estimates of German casualties range from 67,675 to 125,000 killed, wounded and missing.

== Sources ==
- Belgian Government Information Center (1946). The Liberation of Belgium. New York: Belgian Government Information Center. OCLC 4251364.
