= Zemst-Bos =

Village in Flemish Brabant, Belgium

Coordinates: 50°58′20″N 4°25′20″E

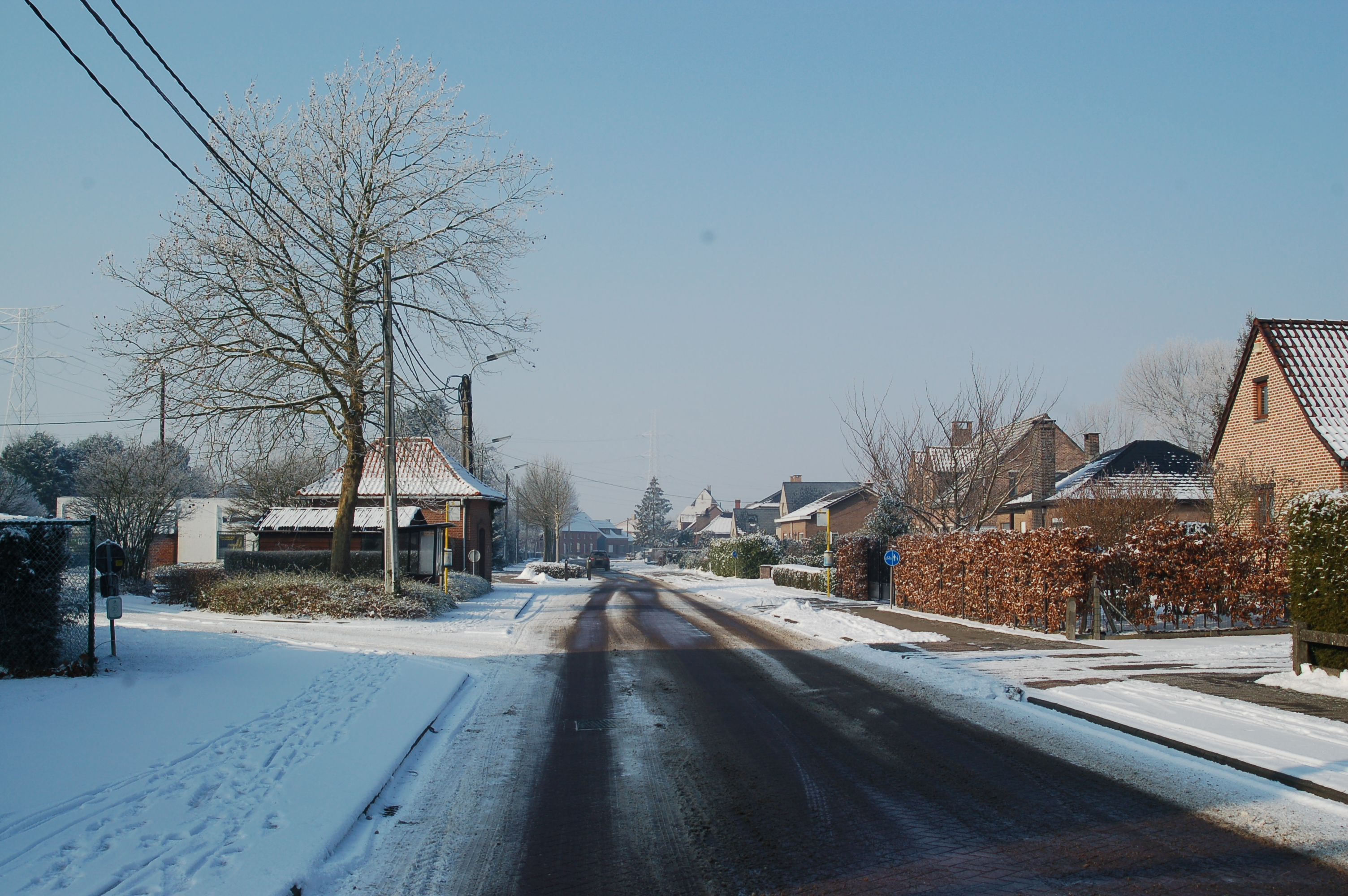
The center of the village, Het Spilt, as seen in February 2012

Zemst-Bos is a village in Flemish Brabant, Belgium. It is part of the municipality of Zemst and has about 1,000 inhabitants.

Het Zwartland is a hamlet of the village.

== History ==
Until the late Middle Ages, the village was a large forest area. In the 13th and 14th centuries, the first large farms were built, especially created for cutting down forests in order to gain agricultural lands. In the late 18th century (1770s), the village had about 70 houses. Since the 1980s, many new houses have been built and the population has reached about 900.

== Gallery ==
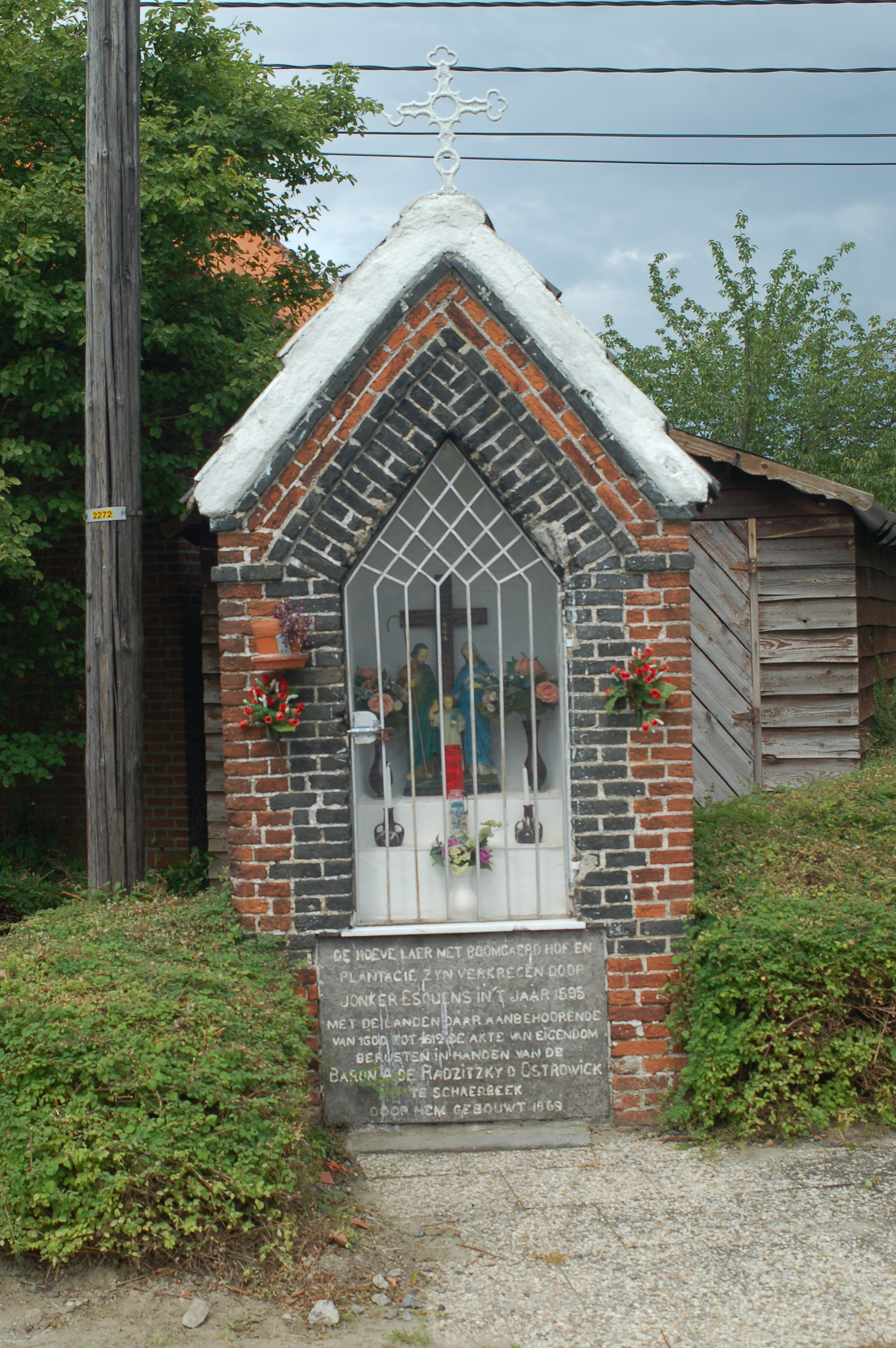
The Chapel of the Holy Family with a slab mentioning the Hoeve Laer Farm. Built in 1869.

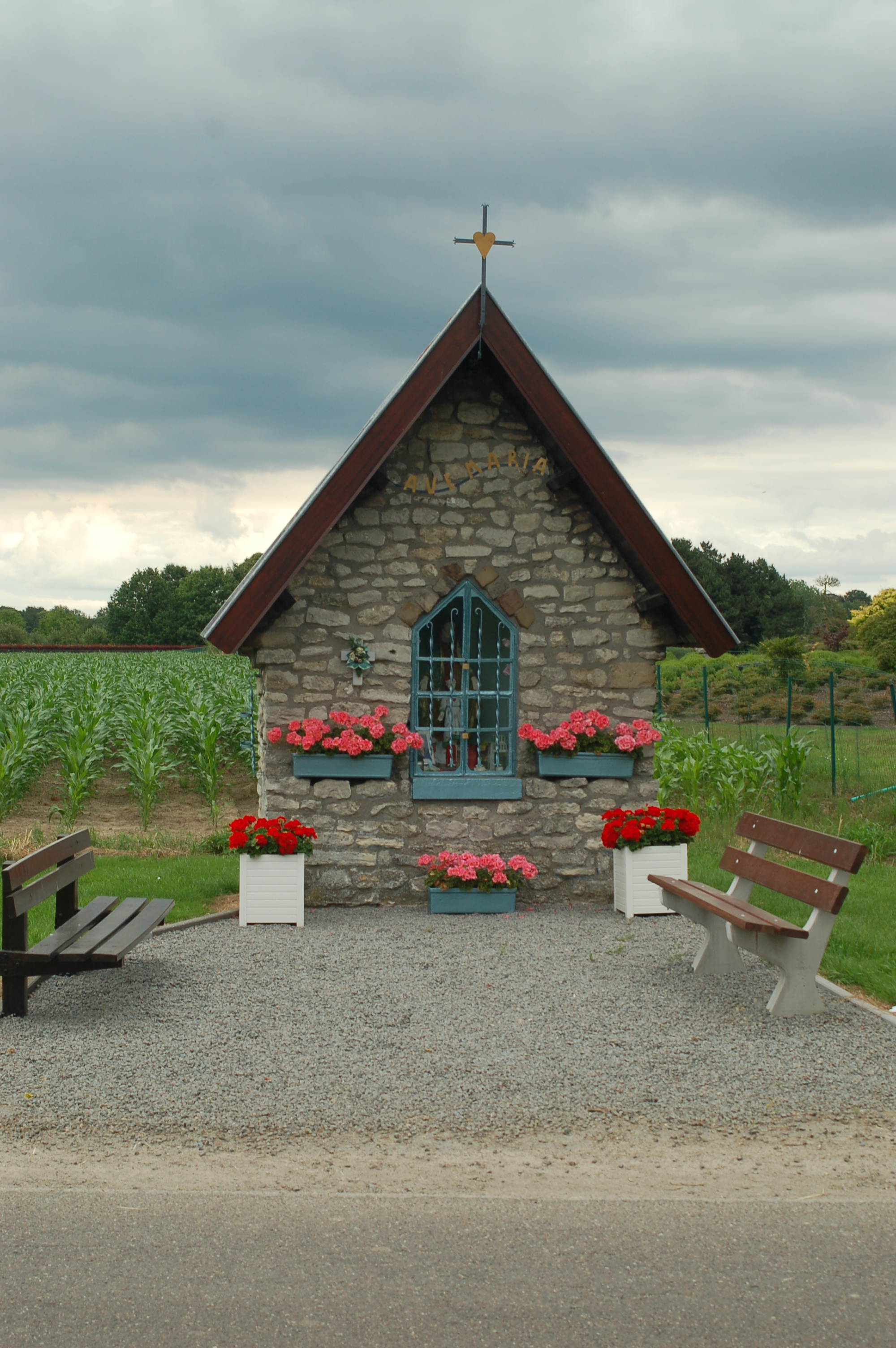
A chapel with benches next to it in the Bosstraat (Foreststreet).

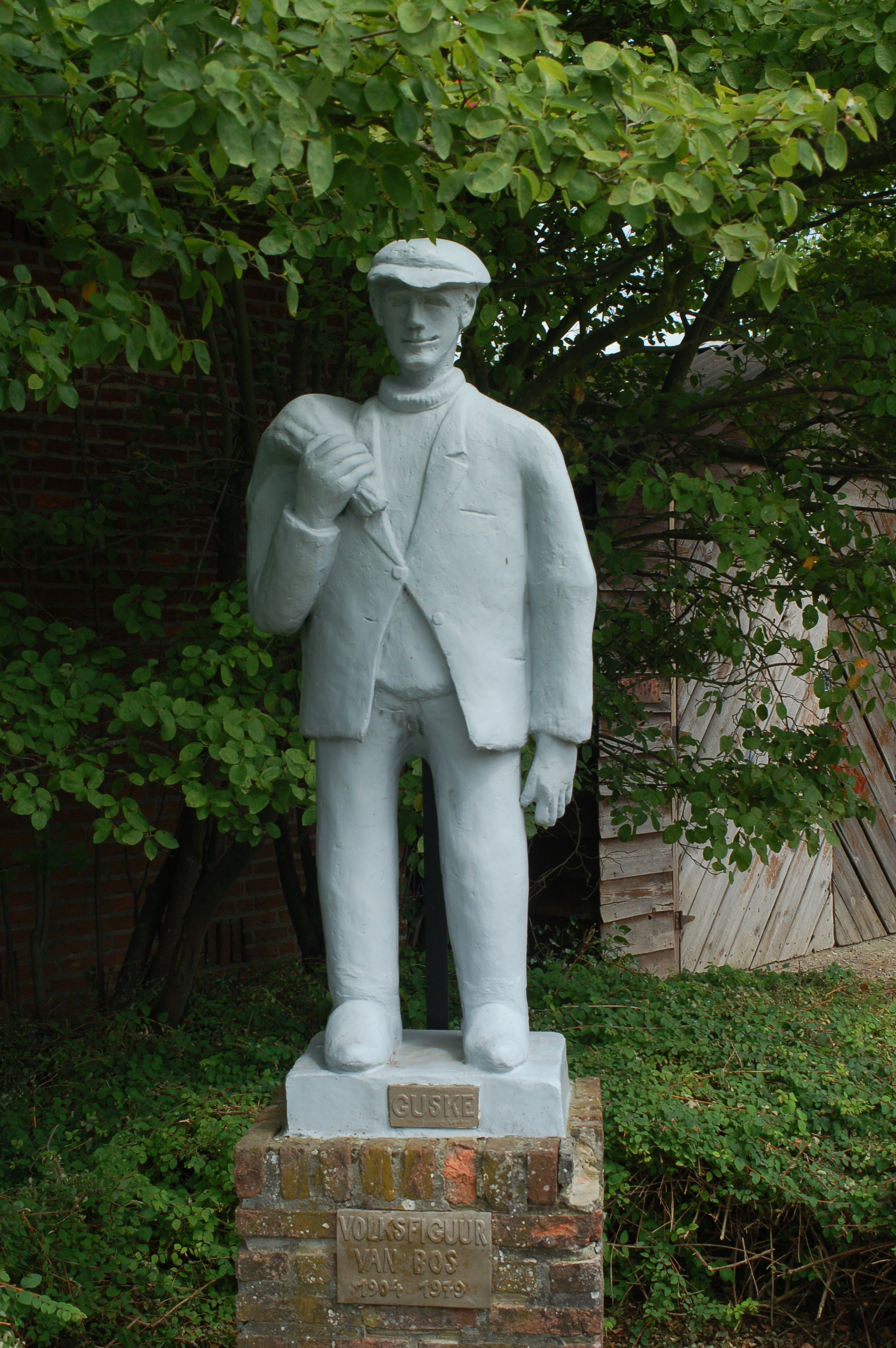
The Statue of "Guske"

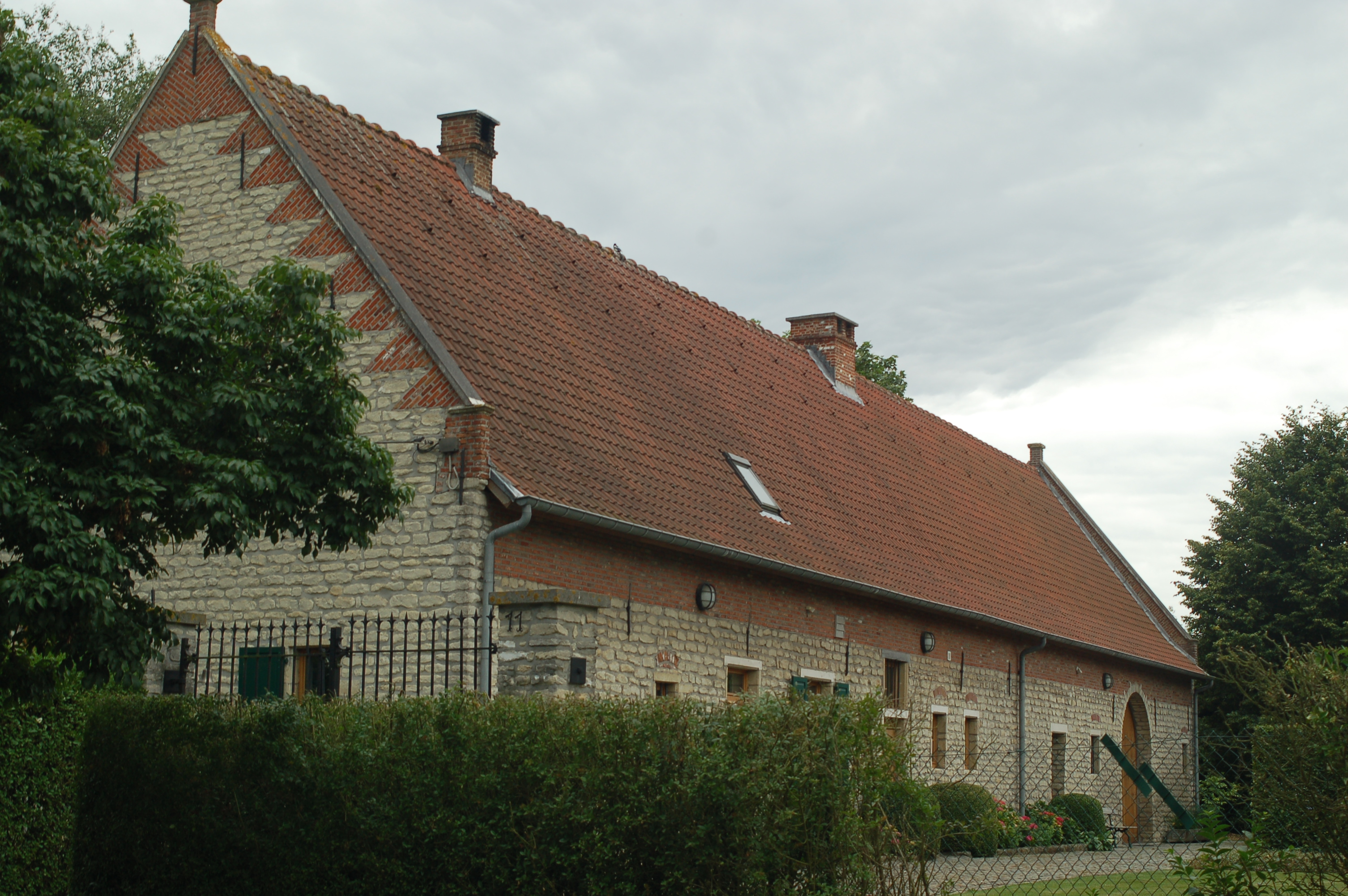
The ancient Schaliënhof, built in 1739.

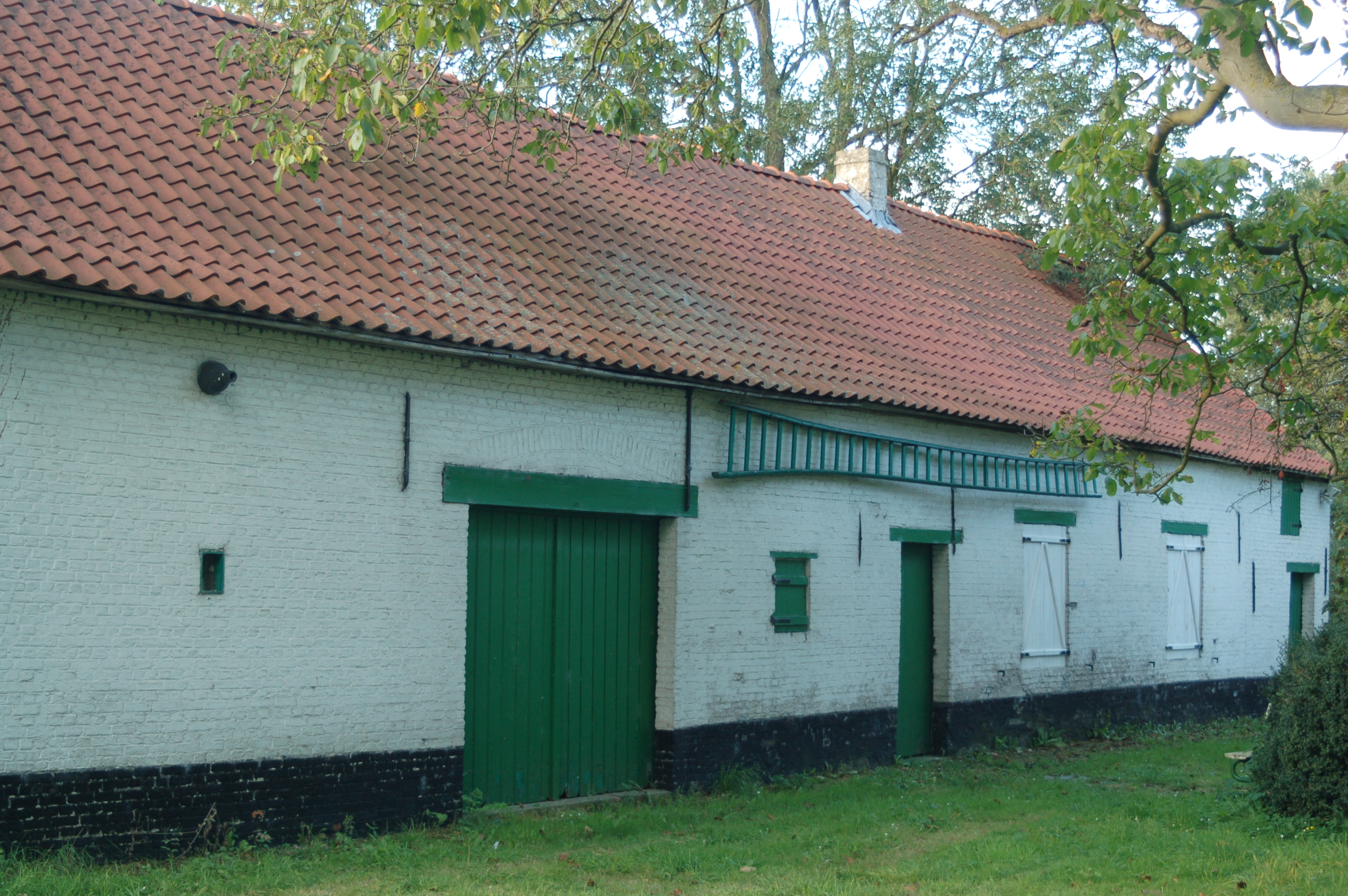
The Sooikesikhoeve, in Het Zwartland, built halfway the 19th century

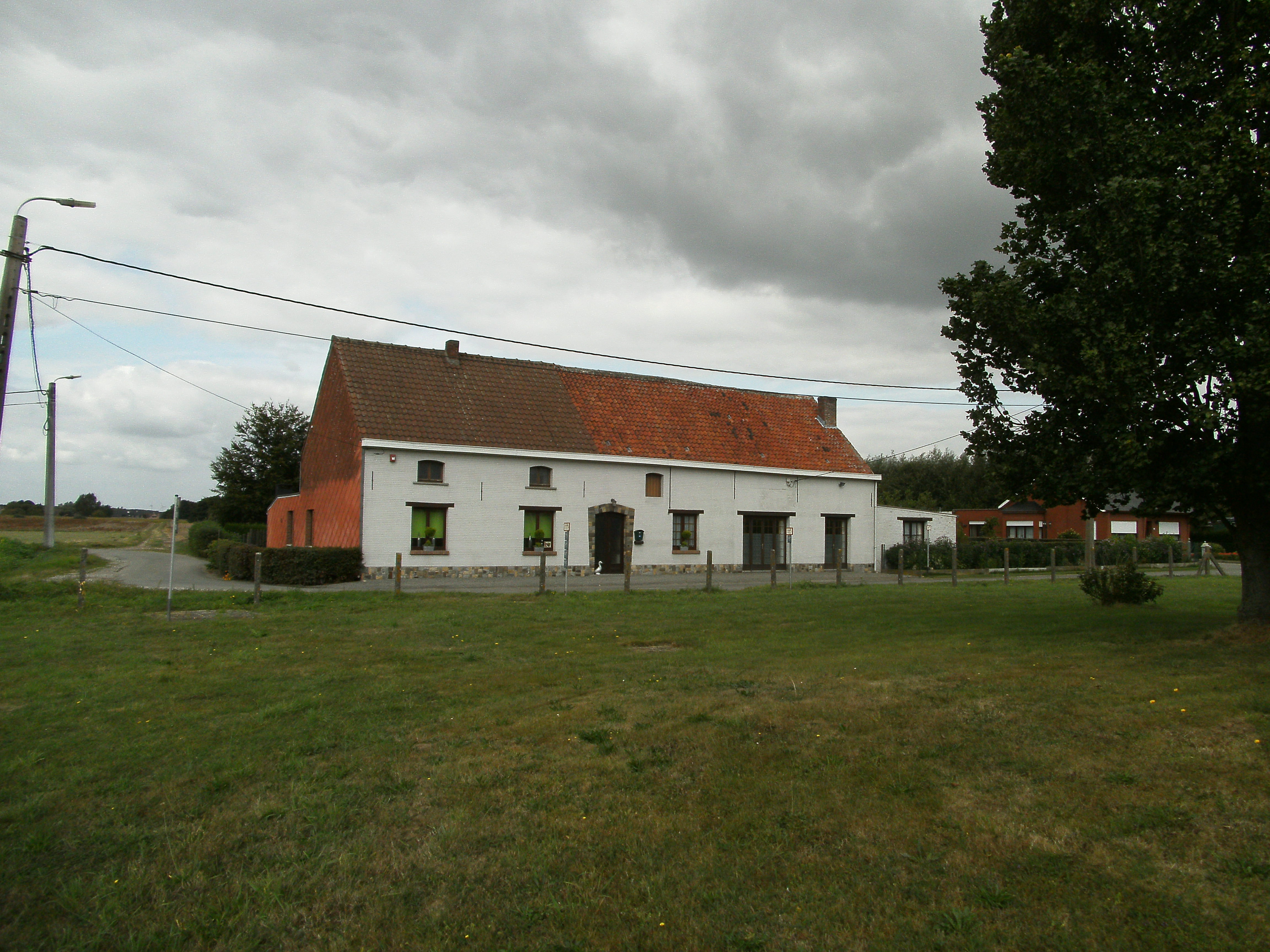
De Zwartlandhoeve, also in Het Zwartland, built around 1770.
