= Krewinkel =

Coordinates: 50.3303°N 6.3831°E

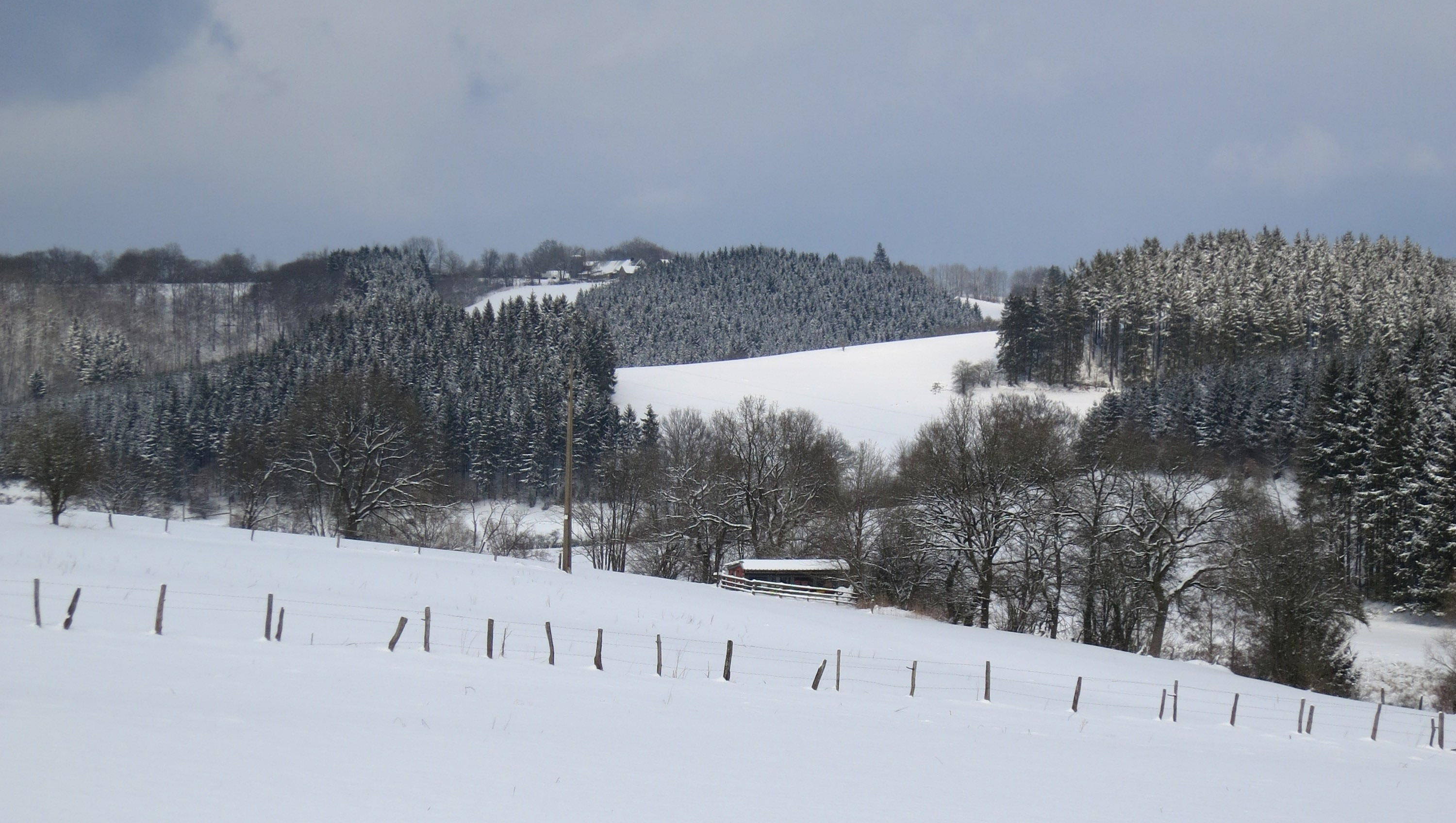
Snow-covered Landscape of Krewinkel

Krewinkel is a hamlet in the municipality of Büllingen, in the province of Liège, Belgium. It has 84 inhabitants and lies at an altitude of about 560 meters. Until 1919, it was part of Germany.

Krewinkel is the easternmost place in Belgium. (See Extreme points of Belgium)

On 4 February 1945, Krewinkel was the last place of Belgium to be liberated by the Allies of World War II during the Liberation of Belgium.
