= Laar, Maasbree =

Laar
- Hamlet
- Location in the Netherlands Location in the province of Limburg in the Netherlands
- Country: Netherlands
- Province: Limburg
- Municipality: Peel en Maas
- Time zone: UTC+1 (CET)
  - Summer (DST): UTC+2 (CEST)
- Postal code: 5993
- Dialing code: 077

Laar is a hamlet in the Dutch province of Limburg. It is located in the municipality of Peel en Maas, 2 km southwest of the town of Maasbree itself.

Laar is not a statistical entity, and the postal authorities have placed it under Maasbree. Laar has no place name signs, and consists of about 10 houses.
