= Eppegem =

Section of Zemst, Belgium

Coordinates: 50.9618°N 4.4557°E

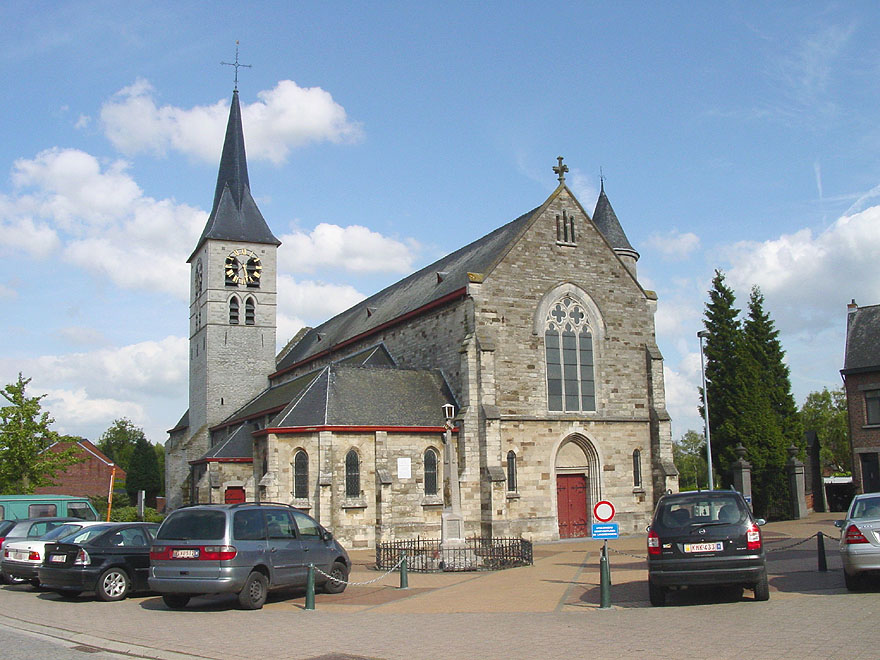
Sint Clemens church, Eppegem

Eppegem is a village in the municipality of Zemst, Flemish Brabant, Belgium.

Eppegem lies on the river Zenne. There is a cemetery of people who died in World War II next to the "Brusselsesteenweg".

Village square with historical buildings

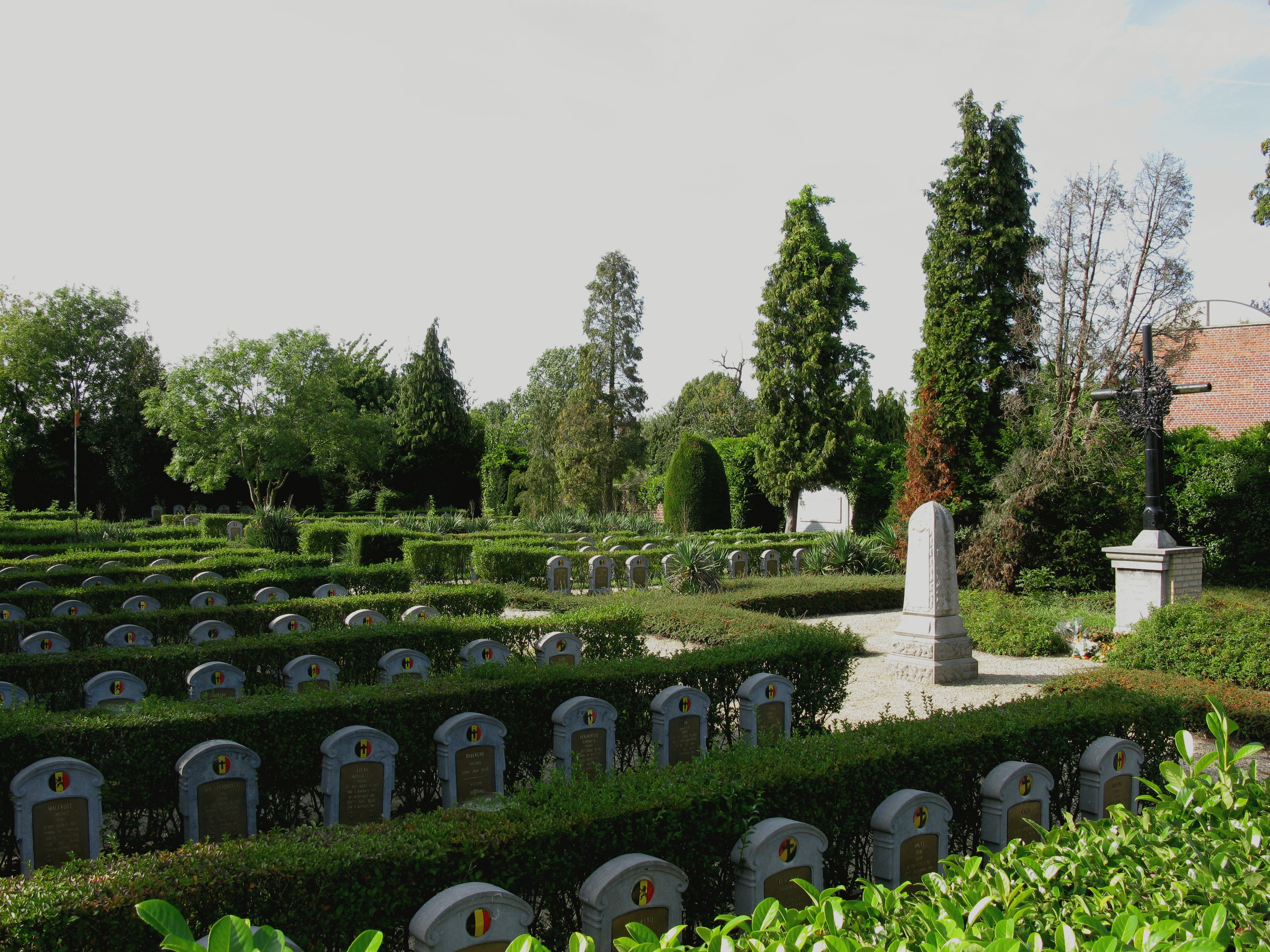
Belgian military cemetery in Eppegem
