= Zemst-Laar =

Coordinates: 50.992°N 4.4156°E

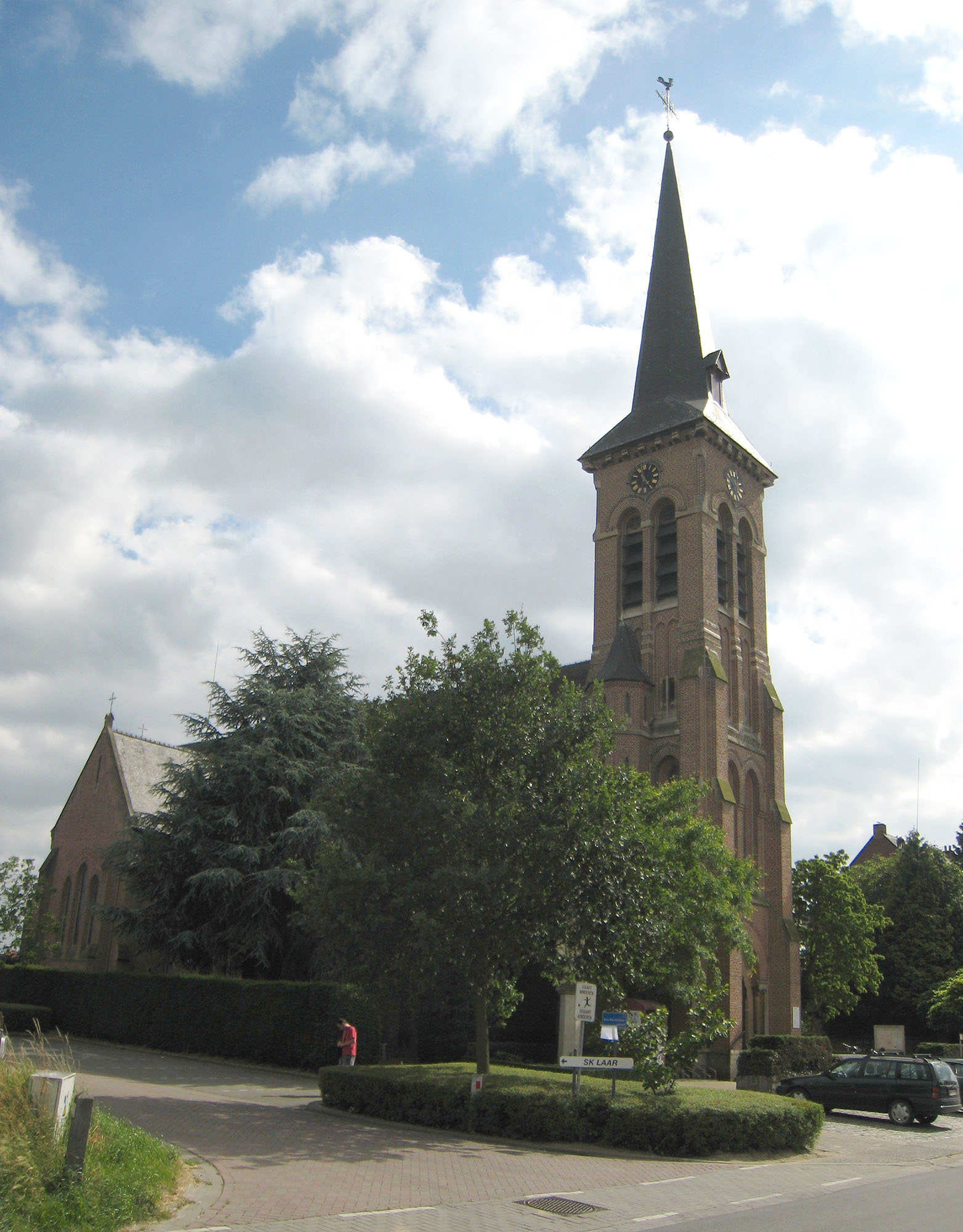
Church of St Engelbert and St Bernard, Laar

Zemst-Laar or Laar is a village in Flemish Brabant, Belgium. It is part of the municipality of Zemst.

The church of St Engelbert and St Bernard was built in 1867 in neogothic style. It was designed by architect Louis Baeckelmans and his brother, also architect, Frans Baeckelmans.

The halvesteen (English translation: half stone) is a stone speculated to be related to sacrifices but is more likely a border marker between Hombeek and Zemst.
