= Lahr (surname) =

Lahr is a surname. Notable people with the surname include:

- Bert Lahr (1895–1967), born Irving Lahrheim, American actor of Jewish German descent
  - Jane Lahr (born 1943), daughter of Bert Lahr, sister of John Lahr
  - John Lahr (born 1941), American theater critic
- Charles Lahr (1885–1971), German-born Londoner anarchist, bookseller and publisher
- Warren Lahr (1923–1969), professional American Football player
