= Perlenbach Valley =

River valley in Belgium and Germany

Coordinates: 50.512062°N 6.249762°E

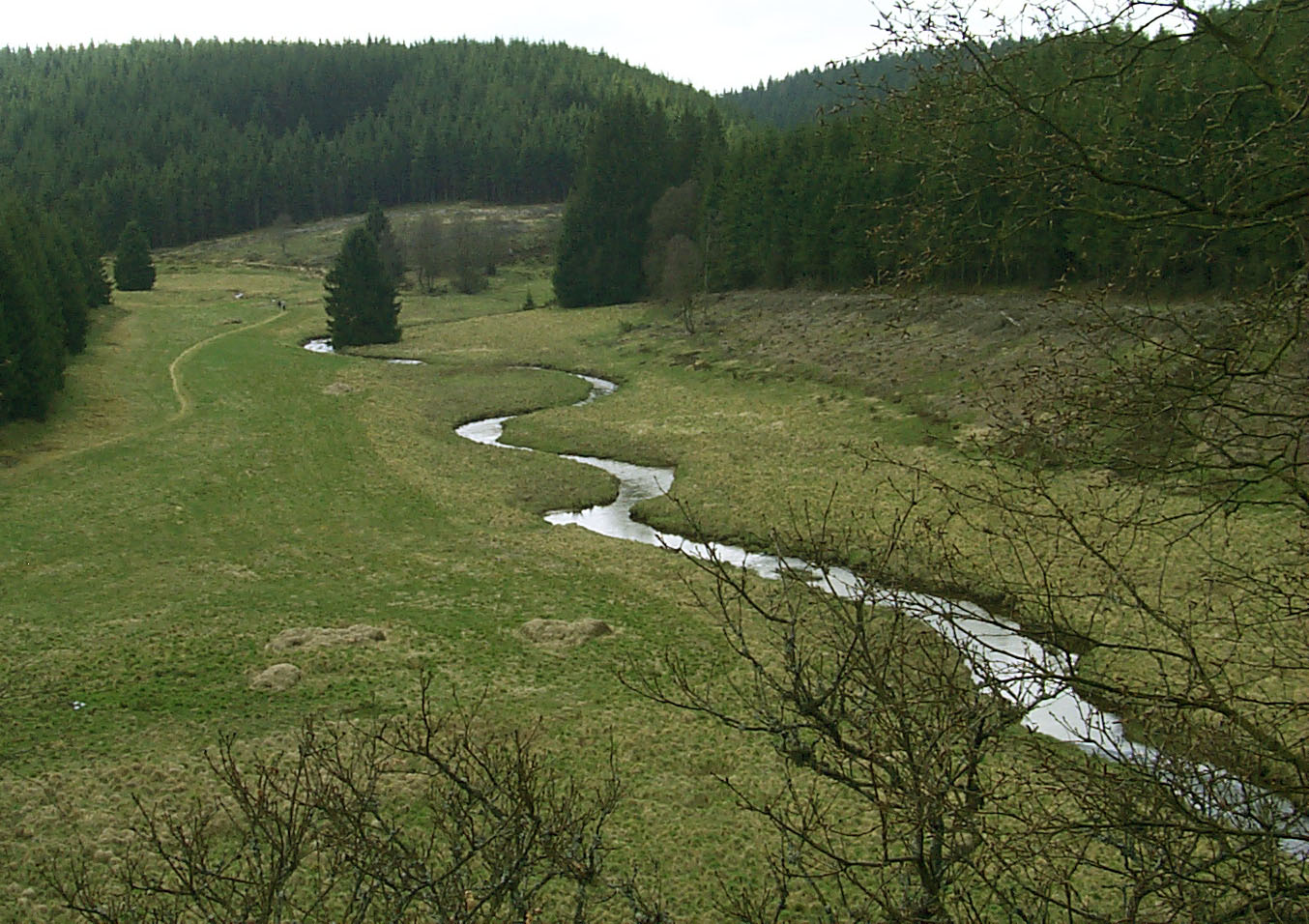
The upper Perlenbach in the Belgian military training area of Elsenborn

The Perlenbach Valley (German: Perlenbachtal or Perlbachtal) is the valley of the Perlenbach stream in the Eifel mountains in the countries of Belgium and Germany. The Perlenbach itself is a tributary of the Rur. The Perlenbach Valley is host to two outstanding, cultural-historical nature reserves along the state border which have a total area of 398 ha.

== Perlenbach ==
The Perlenbach, in East Belgium called the Schwalmbach, is formed from several headstreams and tributaries, most of which rise on Belgian soil in the Elsenborn Training Area near the twin-villages of Rocherath-Krinkelt, in the municipality of Büllingen, Liège Province. There, where it is still called the Schwalmbach, it gathers water from the Rinnsaler Schwalmbach, Krockesbach, Kranbach, Drosbach, Lienbach, Büllingerbach (or Fuhrstbach), the Wolfsbach and the Heisterbach. From its confluence with the Heisterbach, it is known as the Perlenbach. It flows northwards, is impounded by the Perlenbach Dam and discharges into the Rur in Germany, west of the town of Monschau in North Rhine-Westphalia. Its waters are mainly used to supply drinking water by means of the reservoir and its associated waterworks.

== Perlenbach Dam ==
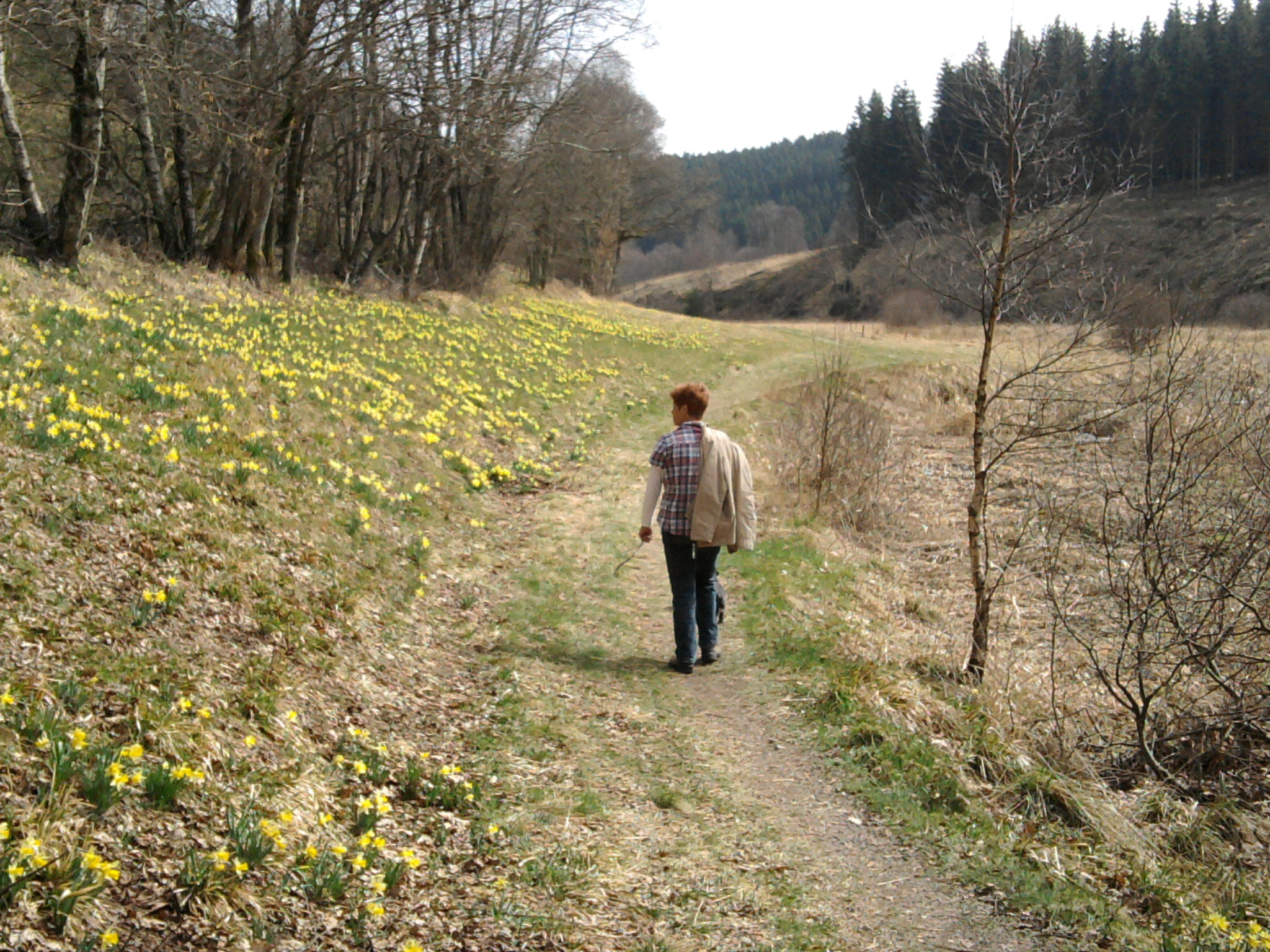
Daffodils in spring in the Perlenbach Valley

In the transition zone from the upper to the lower nature reserve the Perlenbach flows into the Perlenbach Reservoir. Its dam was built from 1953 to 1956 as a rock dam with an external tarmac skin. The reservoir has a maximum capacity of 0.8 million m³. It ensures the water supply of the Aachen-Düren region.

== Literature ==
- Emil Pauls (November 1928), "Perlenfischerei im Perlenbach bei Montjoie" (Digital collections of the University of Cologne), Der Eremit am hohen Venn (in German), vol. 4. Jahrgang, no. 2, Monschau, pp. 23–28
