= Perlenbach (Rur) =

River in Germany

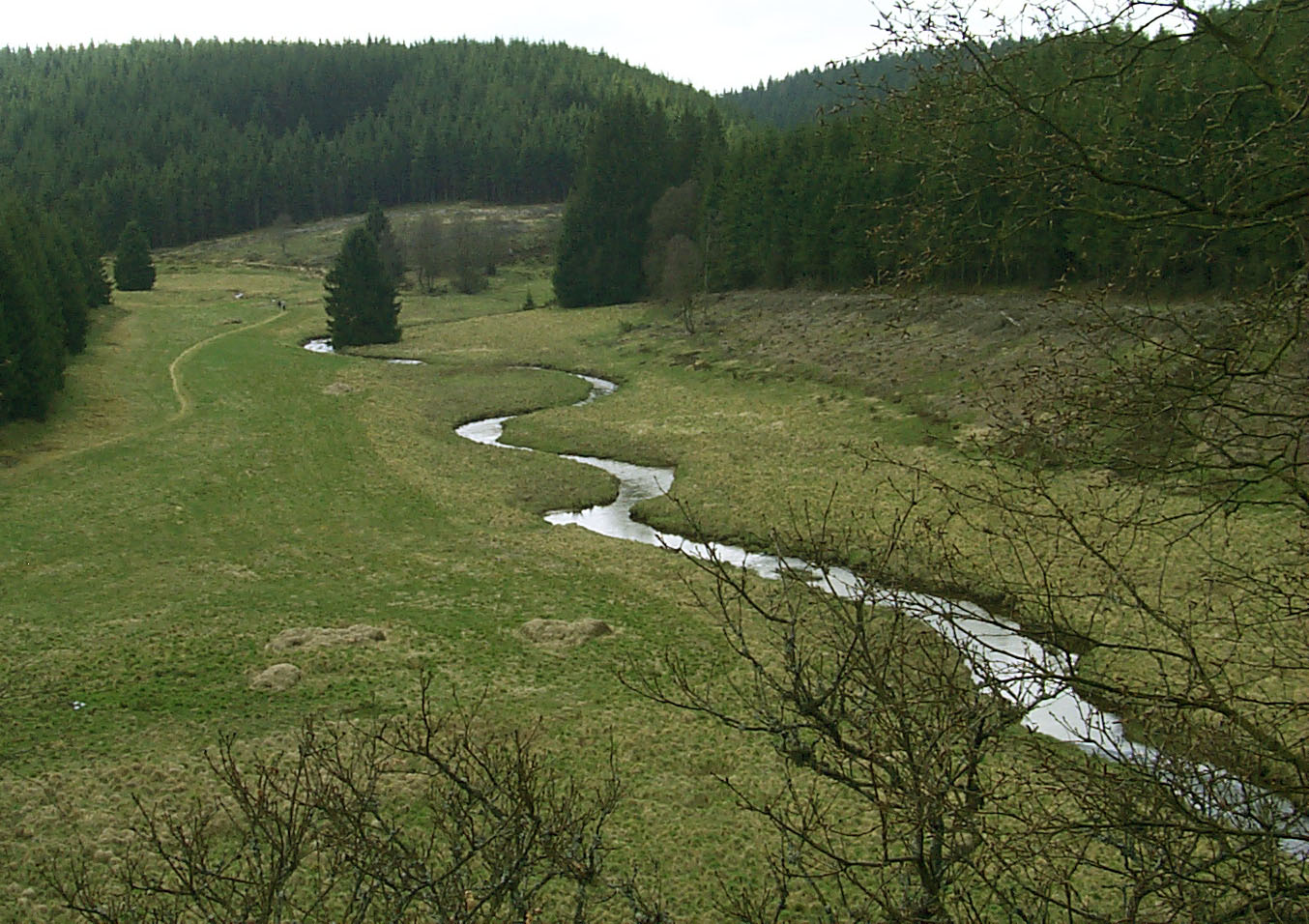

Location
- Countries: Belgium; Germany
- Province: Liège
- State: North Rhine-Westphalia

Physical characteristics
- Source
  - location: High Fens
- Mouth
  - location: Rur
  - coordinates: 50.5488°N 6.2309°E
- Length: 17.6 km (10.9 mi)

Basin features
- Progression: Rur→ Meuse→ North Sea

Perlenbach is a river of North Rhine-Westphalia, Germany and eastern Belgium. Its source is in the Belgian High Fens, north of Büllingen. It is dammed up to create a lake, before flowing from the right into the Rur near Monschau.

== See also ==
- Perlenbach Valley
- List of rivers of North Rhine-Westphalia
