= Laar, Cranendonck =

Coordinates: 51°18′6″N 5°36′40″E

Laar is a hamlet in the Dutch province of North Brabant. It is located in the municipality of Cranendonck, 1 km southwest of the town of Maarheeze.
