= Laar, Beekdaelen =

Laar Laor
- Hamlet
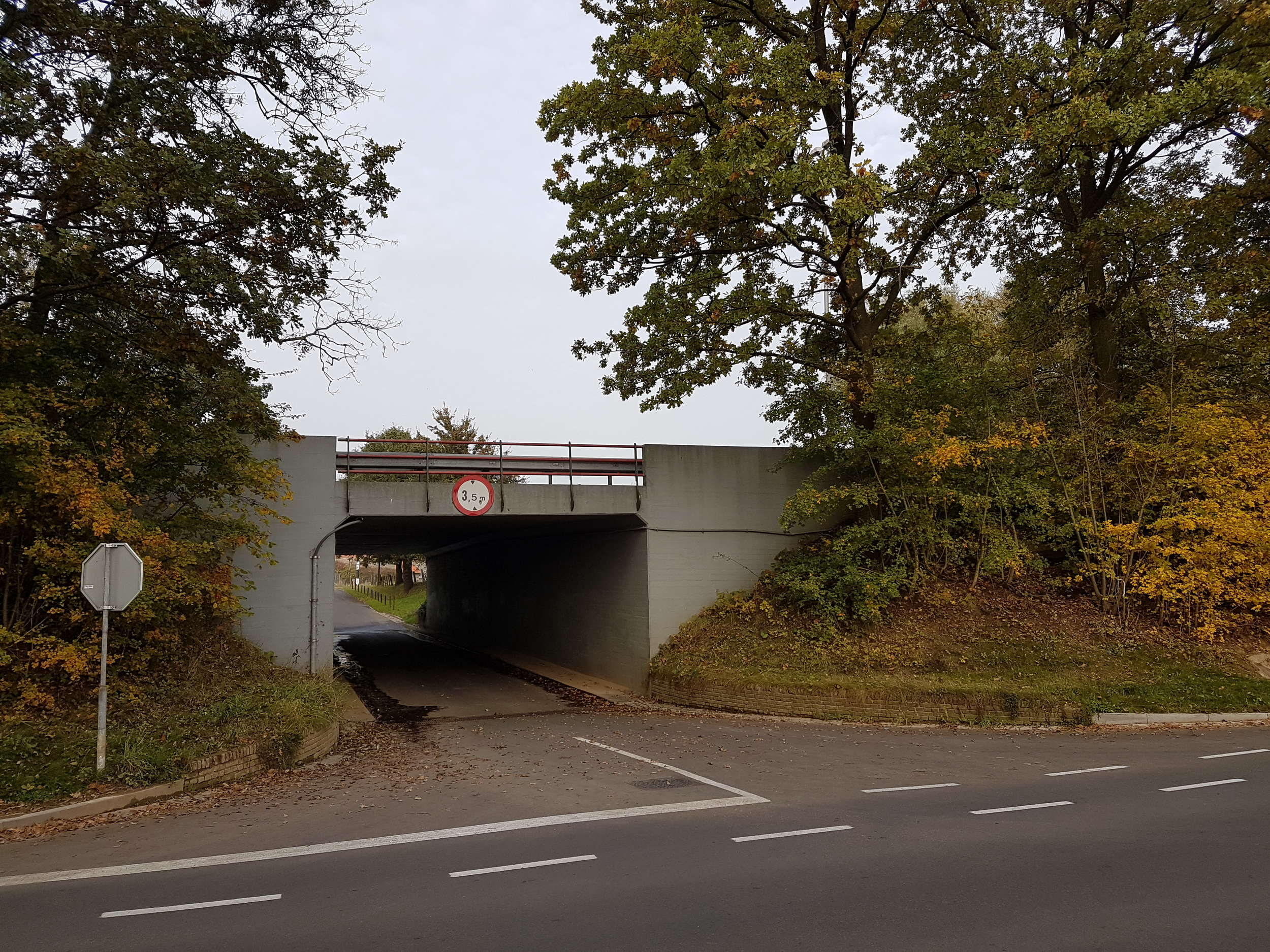
- A76 underpass in Laar

- Location in the Netherlands Location in the province of Limburg in the Netherlands
- Coordinates: 50°54′52″N 5°54′9″E
- Country: Netherlands
- Province: Limburg
- Municipality: Beekdaelen; Heerlen
- Time zone: UTC+1 (CET)
  - Summer (DST): UTC+2 (CEST)
- Postal code: 6361
- Dialing code: 045

Laar (Dutch pronunciation: [ˈlaːr]; Limburgish: Laor [ˈlɔːʀ]) is a hamlet in the Dutch province of Limburg. It is located just to the south of the town Beekdaelen. The A76 motorway divides the hamlet in two parts: the largest part, to the west, is part of the municipality of Nuth; the eastern part is in municipality Heerlen. There are no place name signs and it consists of about 10 houses.
