= Algerian League Against Rheumatism =

The Algerian League Against Rheumatism (French: Ligue Algérienne Antirhumatismale, LAAR) is an Algerian medical organization that aims to promote rheumatology among the general public in Algeria and contribute to the continuing medical education of rheumatologists. It was created in 2000.

Its present president is Pr. Aïcha Ladjouze-Rezig.
