= Laar, Weert =

Laar
- Village
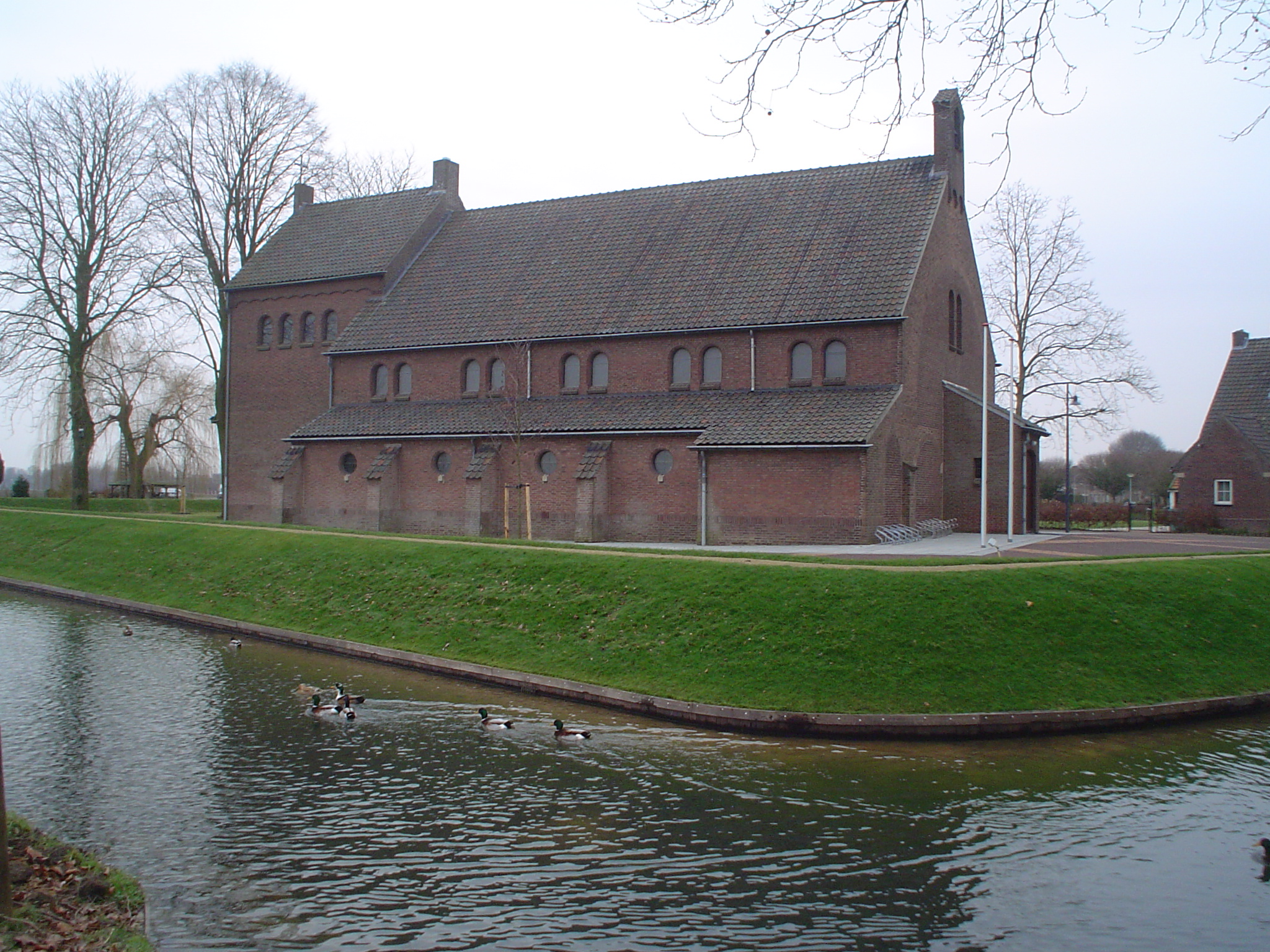
- Hiëronymus and Antonius Church

- Location in the Netherlands Location in the province of Limburg in the Netherlands
- Coordinates: 51°16′30″N 5°52′20″E
- Country: Netherlands
- Province: Limburg
- Municipality: Weert

Area
  - Total: 0.23 km^{2} (0.089 sq mi)
- Elevation: 33 m (108 ft)

Population (2021)
  - Total: 680
  - Density: 3,000/km^{2} (7,700/sq mi)
- Time zone: UTC+1 (CET)
  - Summer (DST): UTC+2 (CEST)
- Postal code: 6003
- Dialing code: 0495

Laar (Limburgish: Laor) is a village in the Dutch province of Limburg. It is located in the municipality of Weert, just 2 km north of the town of Weert itself.

The village was first mentioned in 1790 as Laer, and means "forest meadow".

The grist mill Sint Antonius was built in 1903. It was restored after a storm in 1954. In 1970, it went out of service. It was restored between 1985 and 1987, but abandoned the next year. Between 2013 and 2014, it was restored again.

== Gallery ==
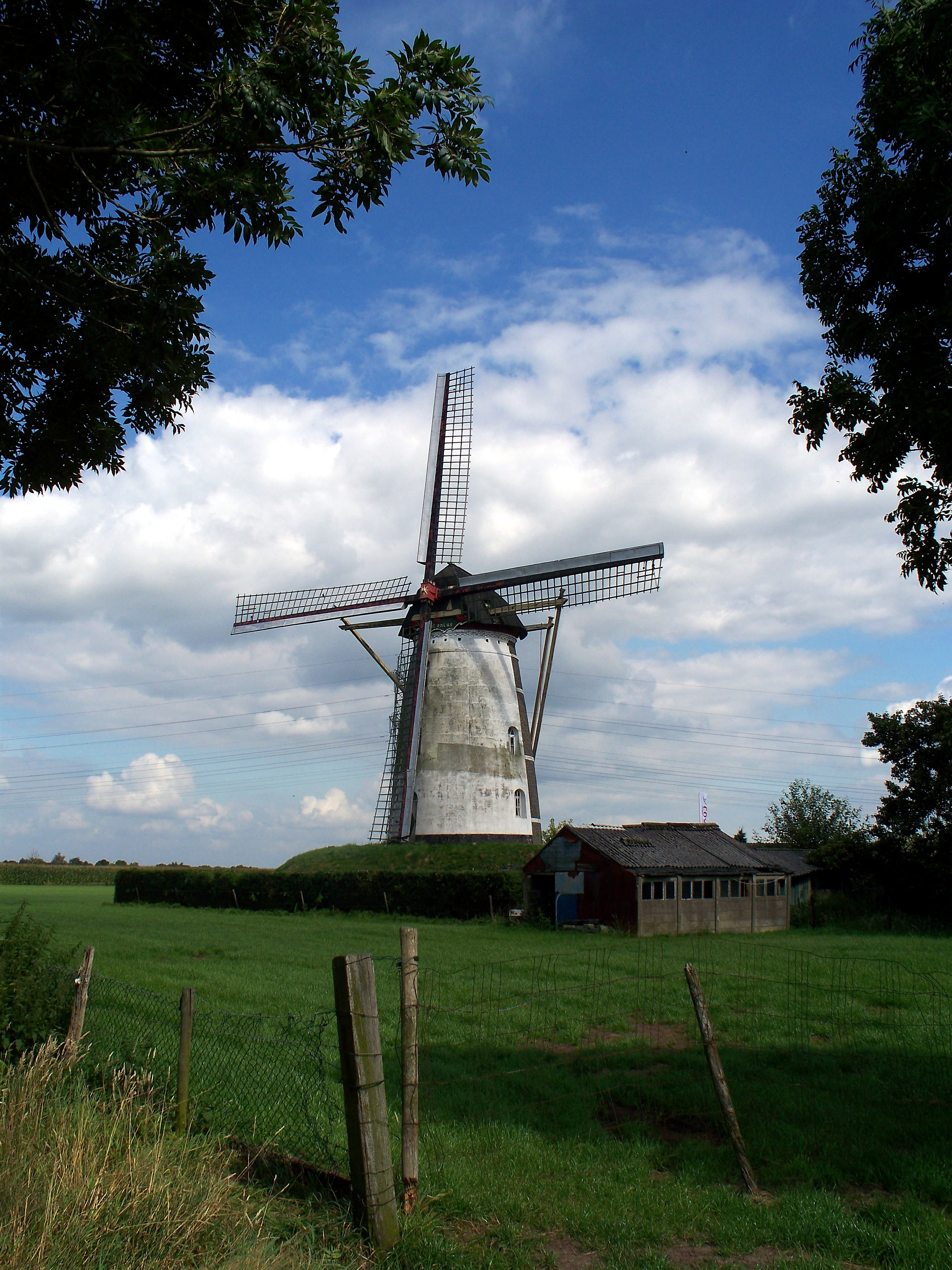
Windmill St. Antonius in Laar

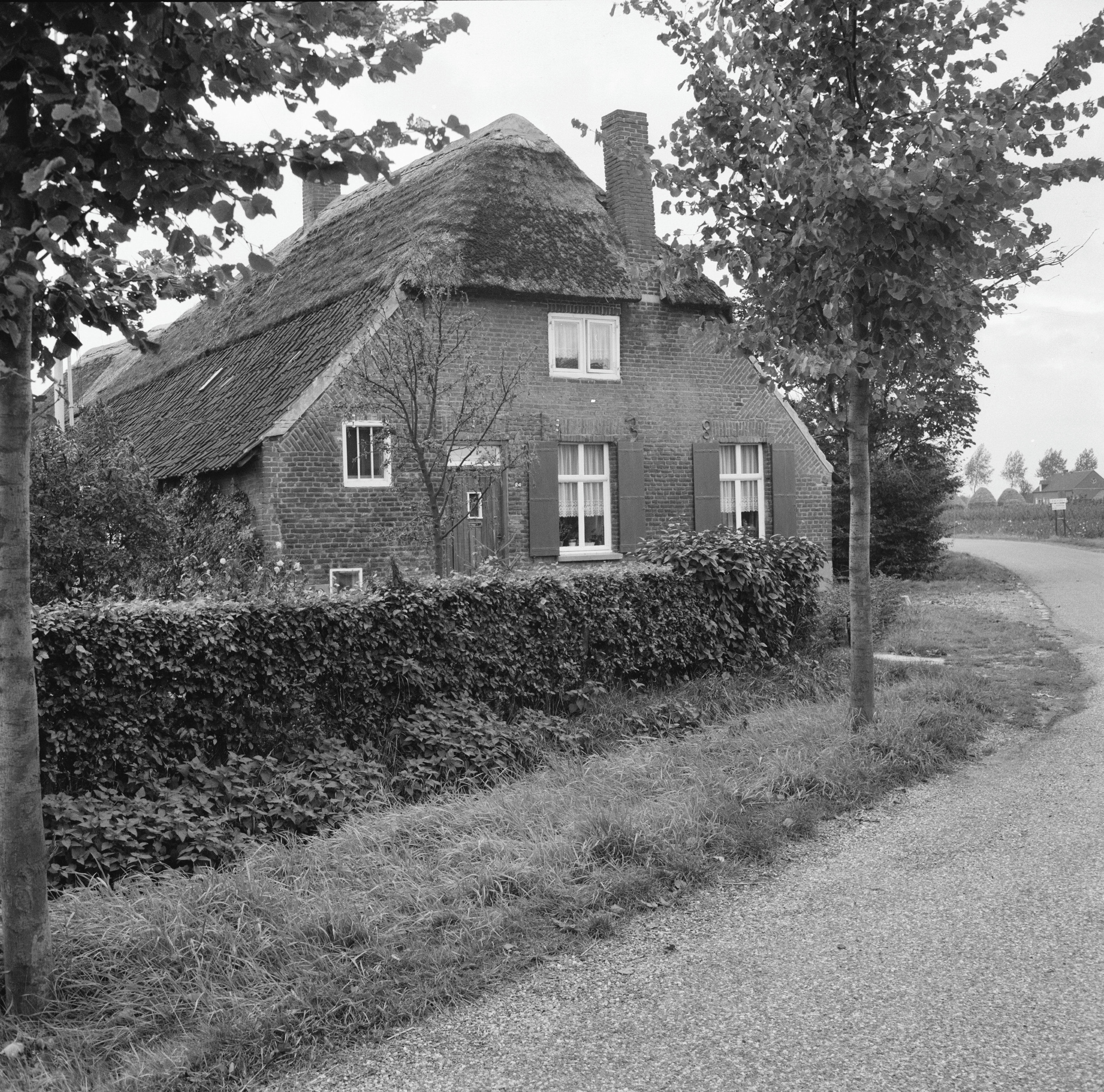
Farm in Laar
