= Laar, Nuenen =

Human settlement in the Netherlands

Laar
- Hamlet
- Location in the province of North Brabant in the Netherlands Laar (Netherlands)
- Coordinates: 51°29′33″N 5°33′15″E
- Country: Netherlands
- Province: North Brabant
- Municipality: Nuenen, Gerwen en Nederwetten
- Time zone: UTC+1 (CET)
  - Summer (DST): UTC+2 (CEST)
- Postal code: 5674
- Dialing code: 040

Laar is a hamlet in the Dutch province of North Brabant. It is located in the municipality of Nuenen, Gerwen en Nederwetten, 2 km north of the town of Nuenen, just northwest of Gerwen.

Laar is not a statistical entity, and the postal authorities have placed it under Nuenen. Laar has no place name signs, and consists of about 25 houses.

It was first mentioned in 1406 as "ex bonis te laar", and means "forest pasture".
