= Laar, Vught =

Coordinates: 51°38′0″N 5°12′0″E

Laar is a hamlet in the Dutch province of North Brabant. It is located in the municipality of Vught, 2 km west of the town of Helvoirt.
