= Zemst =

Municipality in Flemish Brabant, Belgium

- Municipality
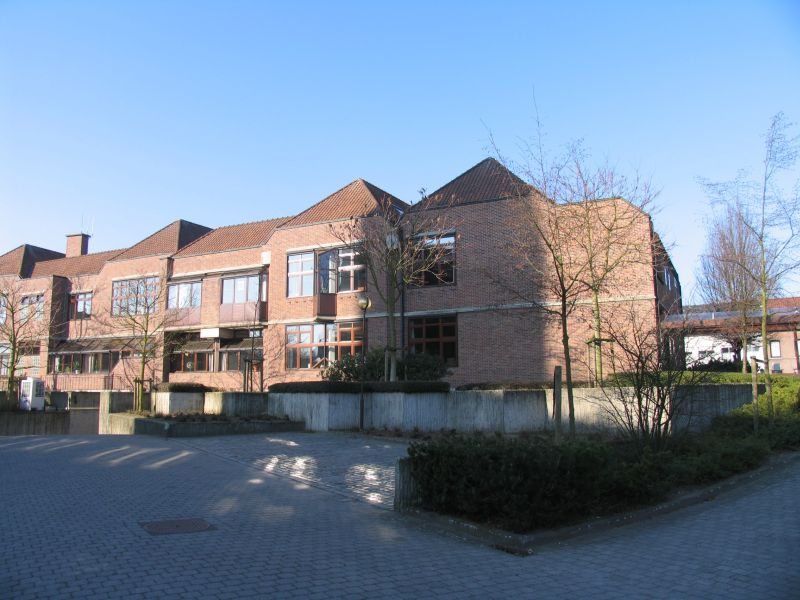
- Town hall of Zemst

- Flag Coat of arms

- Location of Zemst in Flemish Brabant
- Interactive map of Zemst
- Location in Belgium
- Coordinates: 50°59′N 04°28′E
- Country: Belgium
- Community: Flemish Community
- Region: Flemish Region
- Province: Flemish Brabant
- Arrondissement: Halle-Vilvoorde

Government
  - Mayor: Bart Coopman (Iedereen Zemst)
  - Governing parties: Iedereen Zemst, Team Burgemeester, Vlaams Belang, Groen

Area
  - Total: 43.23 km^{2} (16.69 sq mi)

Population (2018-01-01)
  - Total: 23,325
  - Density: 539.6/km^{2} (1,397/sq mi)
- Postal codes: 1980–1982
- NIS code: 23096
- Area codes: 015, 02, 016
- Website: www.zemst.be

Zemst (Dutch pronunciation: [zɛmst]) is a municipality located in the Belgian province of Flemish Brabant. The municipality comprises the villages of Elewijt, Eppegem, Hofstade, Weerde, Zemst-Laar, Zemst-Bos and Zemst proper. On January 1, 2024, Zemst had a total population of 23,401. The total area is 42.83 km^{2} which gives a population density of 541 inhabitants per km^{2}.

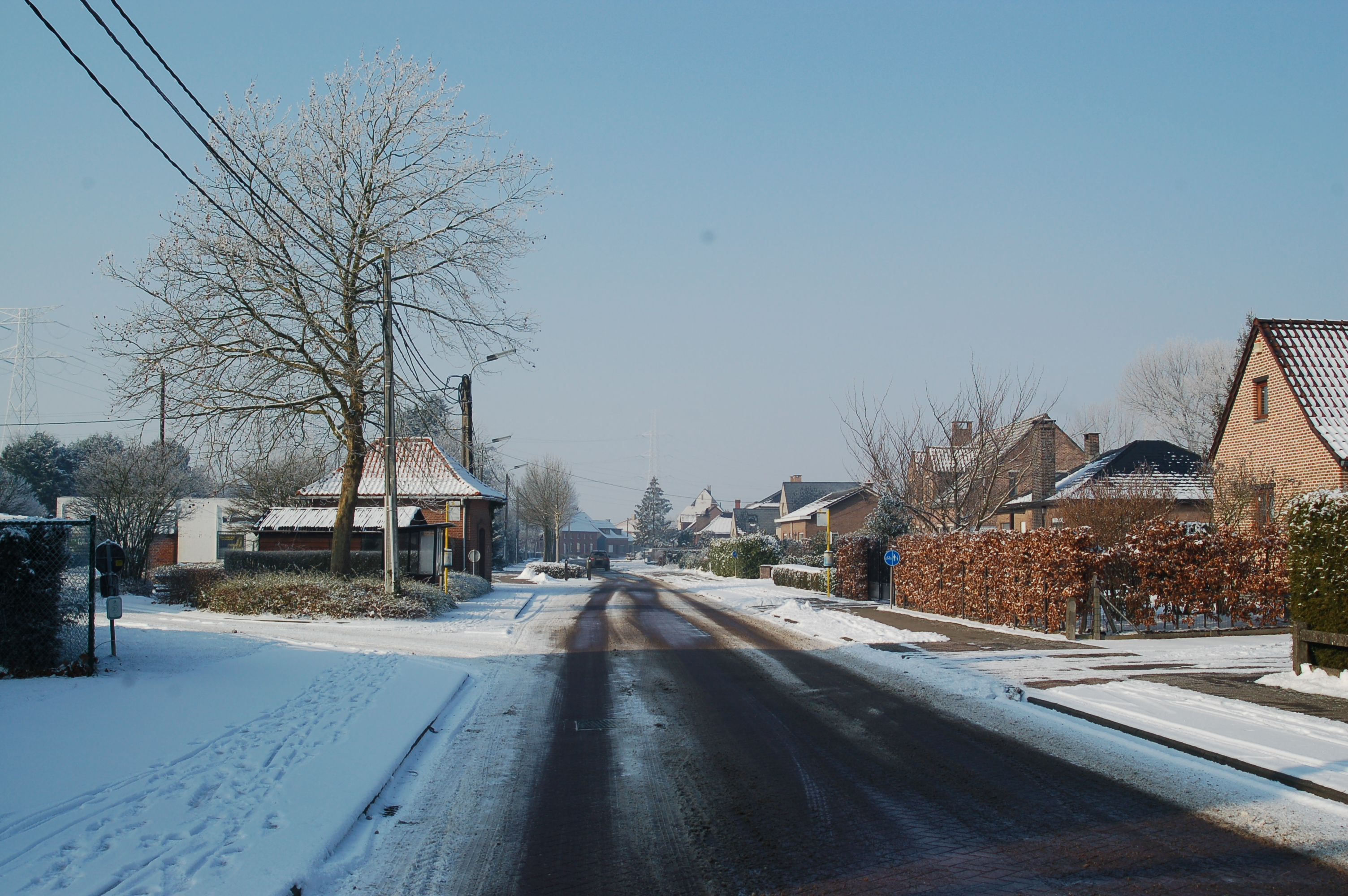
The village of Zemst-Bos
