= Büllingen =

Municipality in the German-speaking Community of Belgium

Büllingen: Bullange (French)
- Municipality
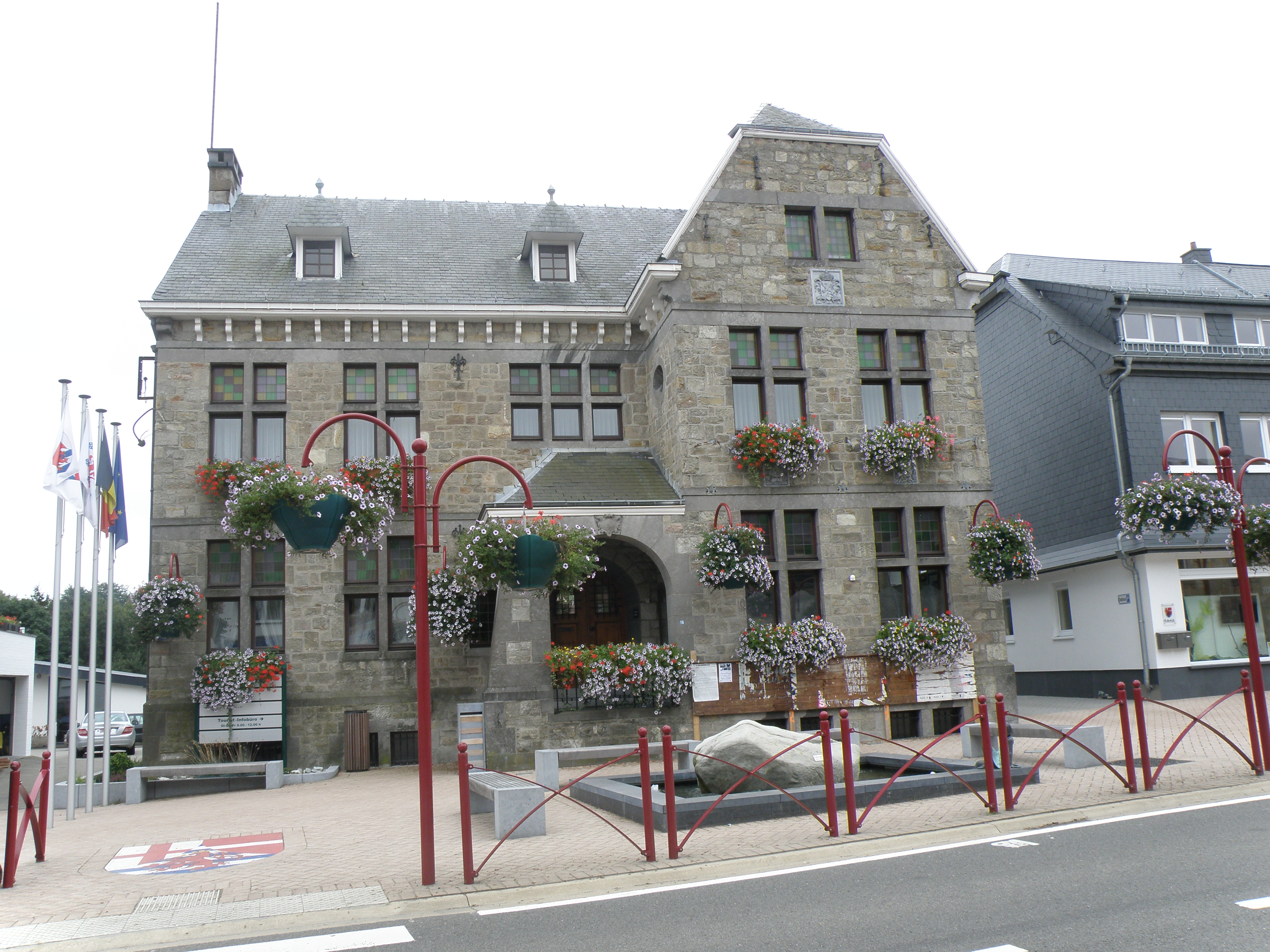
- Büllingen town hall

- Coat of arms

- Location of Büllingen in the province of Liège
- Interactive map of Büllingen
- Location in Belgium
- Coordinates: 50°24′N 06°15′E
- Country: Belgium
- Community: German-speaking Community of Belgium
- Region: Wallonia
- Province: Liège
- Arrondissement: Verviers

Government
  - Mayor: Friedhelm Wirtz (ProDG, Wirtz)
  - Governing party: ProDG / Wirtz

Area
  - Total: 150.67 km^{2} (58.17 sq mi)

Population (2018-01-01)
  - Total: 5,473
  - Density: 36.32/km^{2} (94.08/sq mi)
- Postal codes: 4760–4761
- NIS code: 63012
- Area codes: 080
- Website: www.buellingen.be

Büllingen (German: [ˈbʏlɪŋən]; French: Bullange [bylɑ̃ʒ]) is a municipality of East Belgium, located in the Belgian province of Liège, Wallonia. On January 1, 2006, Büllingen had a total population of 5,385 inhabitants. The total area is 150.49 km^{2} which gives a population density of 36 inhabitants per km^{2}. The official language of Büllingen is German, but it offers French language facilities to francophones.

Since 1977 Büllingen consists of 27 villages:

- Büllingen, Honsfeld, Hünningen, Mürringen
- Rocherath, Krinkelt, Wirtzfeld
- Manderfeld, Afst, Allmuthen, Andlermühle, Berterath, Buchholz, Eimerscheid, Hasenvenn, Hergersberg, Holzheim, Hüllscheid, Igelmonder Hof, Igelmondermühle, Kehr, Krewinkel, Lanzerath, Losheimergraben, Medendorf, Merlscheid, Weckerath.

== Geography ==
Its component village of Krewinkel includes the easternmost point in Belgium. The municipality also contains Rocherath, the highest village in Belgium, as well as the second highest point in Belgium, the Weißer Stein near Mürringen.

== History ==
In the period between 1815–1919, it belonged first to the Kingdom of Prussia and later to the German Empire following the unification of Germany. In 1920 it was ceded to Belgium under the terms of the Treaty of Versailles as part of the Eupen-Malmedy (East Cantons) area.

The town played a role in the Battle of the Bulge as the Germans attempted to advance through the Ardennes Forest in World War II.

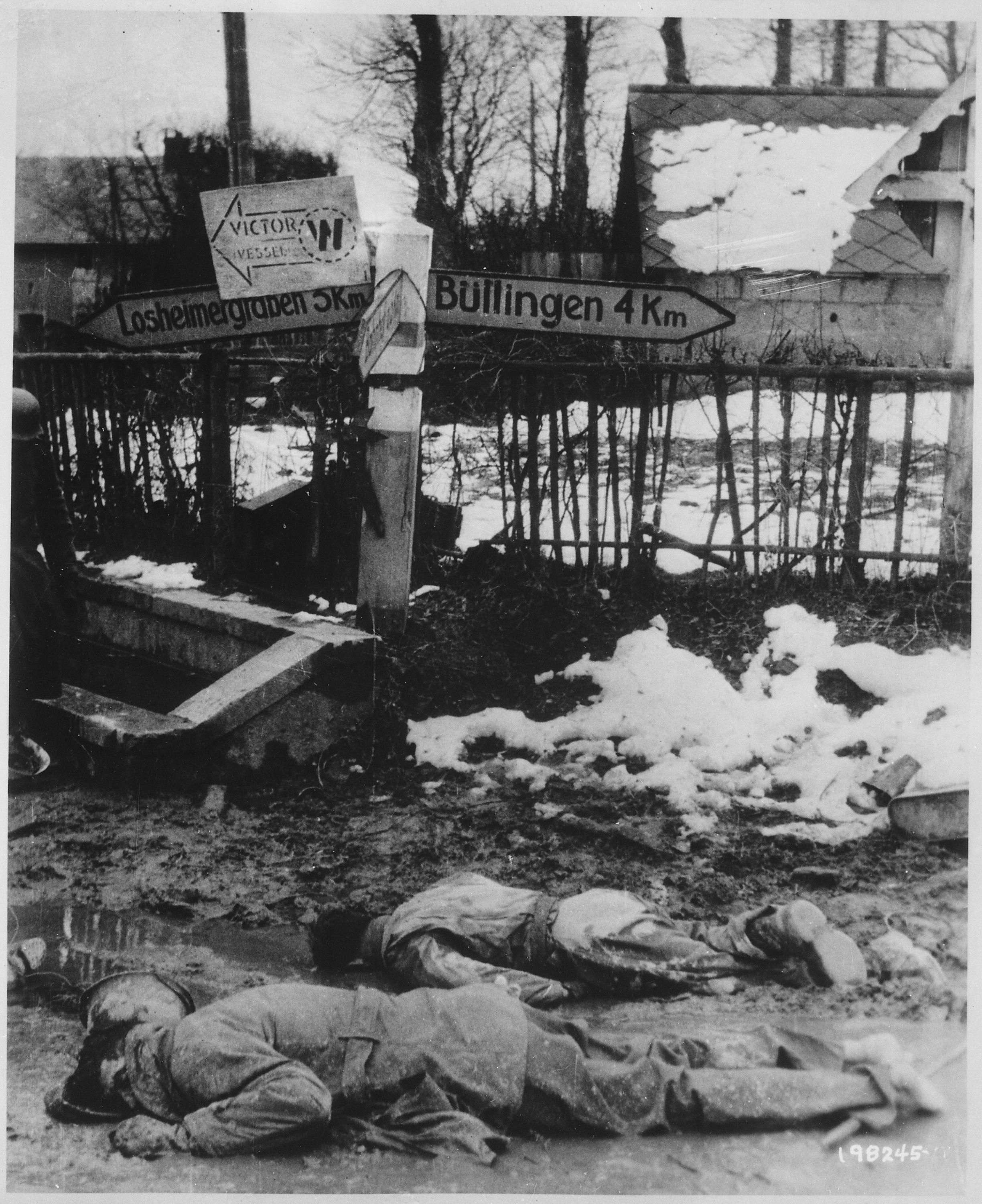
American soldiers, stripped of all equipment, lie dead, face down in the slush of a crossroads near Büllingen

=== Postal history ===
Büllingen post-office opened in December 1863, in the Malmedy county (Kreis) of the Aachen district (Bezirk) in the Rheinland province.

Postal codes since 1969: 4760 Büllingen; 4761 Rocherath. In 1969 Manderfeld 4778 (4760 in 1990).

== Sports ==
The municipality has two main football clubs: KFC Büllingen of Büllingen village (matricule number 7257) and SG Rapid Mürringen of Mürringen village.

== See also ==
- List of protected heritage sites in Büllingen
