= The Enchanted Pose =

Painting by René Magritte

- French: La pose enchantée
- Artist: René Magritte
- Year: 1927
- Medium: Oil on canvas
- Dimensions: 114 cm × 162 cm (45 in × 64 in)

The Enchanted Pose was a 1927 painting by René Magritte depicting a side-by-side pair of identical female nudes in a bare interior. It has been lost since the 1930s.

In 2013, technicians From MoMa examining Magritte paintings using x-ray fluorescence discovered fragments of the composition concealed under two compositions Magritte painted in the 1930s. One was The Portrait (1935) held at MoMa, the other one was The Red Model (1935) at Stockholm's Moderna Museet.

Sometime between 1927 and the mid-1930s, Magritte had cut the painting into pieces and recycled the canvas, to be painted over. In 2016, a third fragment was identified under a painting entitled The Human Condition (1935) in the Norwich Castle Museum & Art Gallery. In 2017, it was announced that the fourth and final fragment was found under his work God is not a Saint (c. 1935–36), located in the Magritte Museum, in Brussels.

== See also ==
- List of paintings by René Magritte
- 1927 in art
