= 16th September (painting) =

Painting by René Magritte

- 16th September by René Magritte
- Artist: René Magritte
- Year: 1956
- Medium: Oil on canvas
- Dimensions: 115 cm × 88 cm (45.27 in × 34.64 in)
- Location: Royal Museum of Fine Arts, Antwerp
- Preceded by: The Mysteries of the Horizon
- Followed by: The Alarm Clock
- Website: kmska.be/en/masterpiece/sixteenth-september

16th September (Dutch: Zestien september) is a 1956 painting by Belgian surrealist painter René Magritte. It is now in the Royal Museum of Fine Arts, Antwerp, which bought it directly from the artist.

== Description ==
16th September is an oil painting on canvas, measuring 115 by 88 centimetres (45.28 by 34.65 in). It depicts a tree surrounded by an empty field with rocks. A waxing crescent moon appears in the foreground, in front of the tree.

== Analysis ==
All elements of the painting are rendered in a realistic manner, but the painting is in line with Magritte's other surrealist works because the Moon appears entirely in front of the tree, rather than shining through its leaves–which is impossible in the real world.

It is unclear whether the title holds any particular significance. According to Magritte's journals, it was suggested by his friend, surrealist poet Louis Scutenaire.

Some analyses have noted that the phase of the Moon in the painting does not match the phase that the Moon was in on 16 September 1956.

== History ==
Magritte painted 16th September in July 1956, while under exclusive contract with Alexander Iolas, an art dealer who popularized Magritte's work in the United States. During this period, Magritte often painted many variations on the same theme; as such, there are several versions of 16th September, with two of them dated to 1956. The Minneapolis Institute of Art holds one version, which has red highlights and was done in gouache and graphite on paper.

The painting received attention during a 2011 exhibition of Magritte's works at the Tate Liverpool gallery, when fans of English musician Marc Bolan drew connections between 16th September and Bolan's death, which occurred on that date in 1977. The official Marc Bolan fan club held a giveaway for tickets to the exhibit and arranged a meetup there on 16 September of that year.

== See also ==
- List of paintings by René Magritte
- 1956 in art
