= La Condition Humaine =

La Condition humaine is a French expression that has been used as the title for various works:

- La Condition humaine, a series of pictures by Rene Magritte
- A novel by Andre Malraux, translated as Man's Fate

== See also ==
- Human condition (disambiguation)
