= The Difficult Crossing =

Painting by René Magritte

The Difficult Crossing (La traversée difficile)
- Artist: René Magritte
- Year: 1926
- Medium: Oil on canvas
- Dimensions: 80 cm × 65.3 cm (31.5 in × 26 in)
- Location: Private collection

The Difficult Crossing (La traversée difficile) is the name given to two oil-on-canvas paintings by the Belgian surrealist René Magritte. The original version was completed in 1926 during Magritte's early prolific years of surrealism and is currently held in a private collection. A later version was completed in 1963 and is also held in a private collection.

== 2026 version ==
The 1926 version contains a number of curious elements, some of which are common to many of Magritte's works.

The bilboquet or baluster (the object resembling the bishop from a chess set) first appears in the painting The Lost Jockey (1926). In this and some other works—for example The Secret Player (1927) and The Art of Conversation (1961)—the bilboquet seems to play an inanimate role analogous to a tree or plant. In other instances, such as here with The Difficult Crossing, the bilboquet is given the anthropomorphic feature of a single eye.

Another common feature of Magritte's works seen here is the ambiguity between windows and paintings. The back of the room shows a boat in a thunderstorm, but the viewer is left to wonder if the depiction is a painting or the view out a window. Magritte elevated the idea to another level in his series of works based on The Human Condition where "outdoor" paintings and windows both appear and even overlap.

Near the bilboquet stands a table. On the top, a disembodied hand is holding a red bn a room, the action has moved outside. There is no table or hand clutching a bird and the scene of the rough sea in the ambiguous window/painting at the rear becomes the entire new background. Near the front a low brick wall is seen with a bilboquet behind and a suited figure with an eyeball for a head in front.

There is ambiguity as to whether the suited figure is a man or another bilboquet. Some bilboquet figures, for example those in The Encounter (1929), have similar eyeball heads, however the suit covers the body and no clear identification can be made. If the suited figure is a man, it could be a self-portrait, which means that the eyeball is covering his face. Covering Magritte's face with an object was another common theme for himself, Son of Man being a good example.

== Relation to other aintings ==
The Birth of the Idol (1926)

Both versions of The Difficult Crossing show a strong similarity to Magritte's painting The Birth of the Idol, also from 1926. The scene is outside and depicts a rough sea in the background (this time without ship). Objects which appear include a bilboquet (the non-anthropomorphic variety), a mannequin arm (similar to the hand which clutches the bird) and a wooden board with window-like holes cut out which is nearly identical to those flanking both sides of the room in earlier version.

All three paintings may have been inspired by Giorgio Chirico's Metaphysical Interior (1916) which features a room with a number of strange objects and an ambiguous window/painting showing a boat. Magritte was certainly aware of De Chirico's work and was emotionally moved by his first viewing of a reproduction of Song of Love (1913–14).

== See also ==
- List of paintings by René Magritte
- 1962 in art
