= Toys (film) =

1992 film by Barry Levinson

- Theatrical release poster
- Directed by: Barry Levinson
- Written by: Valerie Curtin; Barry Levinson
- Produced by: Mark Johnson; Barry Levinson
- Starring: Robin Williams; Michael Gambon; Joan Cusack; Robin Wright; LL Cool J
- Cinematography: Adam Greenberg
- Edited by: Stu Linder
- Music by: Hans Zimmer; Trevor Horn
- Production company: Baltimore Pictures
- Distributed by: 20th Century Fox
- Release date: December 18, 1992
- Running time: 122 minutes
- Country: United States
- Language: English
- Budget: $50 million
- Box office: $23.3 million

Toys is a 1992 American surrealist comedy film directed by Barry Levinson, cowritten by Levinson and Valerie Curtin, and starring Robin Williams, Michael Gambon, Joan Cusack, Robin Wright, LL Cool J, Arthur Malet, Donald O'Connor, Jack Warden and Jamie Foxx in his feature film debut. Released in December 1992, the film was produced by Levinson's production company, Baltimore Pictures, and distributed by 20th Century Fox.

The film was a box-office failure at the time of its release. Critical reception was generally negative, with Levinson nominated for a Golden Raspberry Award for Worst Director at the 13th Golden Raspberry Awards. The film received Academy Award nominations for Art Direction (losing to Howards End) and Costume Design (losing to Bram Stoker's Dracula) at the 65th Academy Awards. It was also entered into the 43rd Berlin International Film Festival.

== Plot ==
Kenneth Zevo, the eccentric owner of Zevo Toys in Moscow, Idaho, faces terminal illness. Defying expectations, he bypasses his son, Leslie—a whimsical toymaker apprenticed at the factory—and appoints his estranged brother, U.S. Army Lieutenant General Leland Zevo, as successor. Kenneth believes Leslie's childlike nature would endanger the company, despite his talent. To aid Leslie's maturity, Kenneth hires Gwen Tyler, hoping they will form a romantic relationship.

After Kenneth's death, Leland reluctantly assumes control but delegates factory operations to Leslie and his sister, Alsatia, due to their expertise. However, Leland's militaristic instincts surface upon learning of potential corporate espionage. He enlists his son Patrick, a covert operations specialist, to overhaul security. Inspired by war machinery, Leland proposes manufacturing military toys, clashing with Leslie, who cites Kenneth's pacifist ethos as company policy. Meanwhile, Leslie and Gwen begin dating.

Secretly, Leland converts a factory section to develop miniature remote-controlled war machines, misleading Leslie by claiming it is for experimental toys. After the military rejects his prototypes, Leland grows unhinged, expanding production, militarizing the facility, and displacing workers—including Alsatia. Suspicious, Leslie and Alsatia infiltrate the restricted area and discover children piloting war drones via arcade-style consoles. They narrowly escape an amphibious drone, the "Sea Swine," and alert Gwen and Kenneth's former assistant Owen Owens.

Patrick, learning Leland lied about his mother Dee Dee's death, defects to Leslie's side. The group infiltrates the factory, evading Leland's deadly toys, including "Tommy Tanks" and "Hurly-Burly Helicopters." Leslie rallies vintage Zevo toys from storage, unleashing them against Leland's army in a chaotic showdown. During the clash, Leland's helicopter misfires, destroying his control panel and deactivating his machines.

A critical revelation emerges: Alsatia is an advanced robot built by Kenneth to be Leslie's companion after his mother's death. She is damaged defending against the Sea Swine but later repaired. Leland, attacked by his own drone, is hospitalized. Leslie assumes leadership, restoring the factory's playful ethos with Gwen, while Patrick departs for new missions. The film concludes with the group honoring Kenneth's legacy at a memorial.

== Cast ==
- Robin Williams as Leslie Zevo
- Michael Gambon as Lieutenant General Leland Zevo
- Joan Cusack as Alsatia Zevo
- Robin Wright as Gwen Tyler
- LL Cool J as Captain Patrick Zevo
- Donald O'Connor as Kenneth Zevo
- Arthur Malet as Owen Owens
- Jack Warden as Old General Zevo
- Julio Oscar Mechoso as Cortez
- Debi Mazar as Nurse Debbie
- Jamie Foxx as Baker
- Kate Benton as Researcher
- Steve Park as Researcher
- Julie Hayden as Researcher
- Yeardley Smith as Miss Drum
- Blake Clark as Hogenstern
- Wendy Melvoin as Choir Soloist
- Sam Levinson as War Room Player

== Production ==
Barry Levinson wrote Toys with his then-wife, Valerie Curtin, in 1979, intending it to be his directorial debut. He came up with the story after reading a newspaper article about the Soviet Navy Intelligence Department finding information about United States Navy nuclear submarines from toy models. 20th Century Fox got the rights and originally planned to start principal photography in April 1980. However, the executives who had approved Levinson's script were replaced by a new management team led by Shirley Lansing which, unsure about the project's potential, put it in turnaround.

Levinson tried to revive the project at other studios in the 1980s. In 1982, CBS Theatrical Films agreed to make Toys as one of its first thirty-nine films, but the studio was closed. Columbia Pictures tried to make the film in 1987 during David Puttnam's year as president, but Fox President Leonard Goldberg denied them the rights. In 1988, interest in the project increased after Robin Williams agreed to star in the film and Levinson's film Rain Man became highly successful. In 1990, Fox president Joe Roth finally greenlit the film, assigning a $38 million budget. However, issues during pre-production and scheduling conflicts with Levinson's next film Bugsy (1991) delayed the film for another several years. Producer Mark Johnson noted that the development hell was partly because their intentions were never understood, because "we kept using the word 'whimsy'", while the studios "kept reading it as a black comedy".

Principal photography began on February 25, 1992, at the Fox lot in Los Angeles and concluded in June 1992. Location filming also took place at the Palouse River Valley in Washington. The film nearly went over budget, but Levinson, Williams and producer Mark Johnson reduced costs to just $30 million after they agreed to defer their salaries.

Levinson, who said that the movie had an ironic title regarding how "big toys, little toys—it's all a game, watching that missile go down the chimney blowing up that factory in Iraq could have been in a video arcade", considered that Toys was produced at a favorable time, as post-Cold War military expenditures were cut, and "investing in a force of tiny, remote-controlled $5,000 planes instead of a $450 million one is one way of beating the cutbacks".

Italian designer Ferdinando Scarfiotti spent more than a year designing the sets, which took over every sound stage at Fox Studios in Los Angeles. The influence of René Magritte's art is obvious in the set design and in some of the costume design. The poster distributed to movie theaters featuring Williams in a red bowler hat against a blue, cloud-lined background evokes The Son of Man. Golconda is featured during a sequence in which Leslie (Williams) and Alsatia Zevo (Joan Cusack) perform in a music video sequence rife with surreal imagery, much of it Magritte-inspired. The film's design was also influenced by Dadaism, Modernism and Italian Futurism—notably the work of Fortunato Depero.

The film has often been noted for many of its outdoor scenes, which feature the Palouse region. All of the outdoor scenes, including the trailer, were filmed on location in southeastern Washington near Rosalia and north-central Idaho.

== Release and reception ==
=== Promotion ===
The film was publicized with a trailer that features Williams walking through a large undulating field of green grass, breaking the fourth wall and talking to the audience. This trailer was parodied on fifth season of the TV show, The Simpsons, in the episode, "Burns' Heir", substituting Charles Montgomery Burns (Harry Shearer) for Williams.

=== Box office ===
Toys was released in 1,272 venues, earning $4,810,027 and ranking sixth in its opening weekend, second among new releases, behind Forever Young. The film would ultimately gross $23,278,931 in North America, making it a commercial failure based on a $50 million budget.

=== Critical response ===
The film has an approval rating of 29% on Rotten Tomatoes, based on 28 reviews, and an average score of 4.5/10. The website's consensus reads: "Like a colorfully overengineered gewgaw on the shelf, Toys might look like fun, but its seemingly limitless possibilities lead mainly to confusion and disappointment." Metacritic, which uses a weighted average, assigned the film a score of 40 out of 100, based on 25 critics, indicating "mixed or average" reviews. Audiences surveyed by CinemaScore gave the film an average grade of "C+" on a scale of A+ to F.

Kenneth Turan of the Los Angeles Times stated that what made the film "that much sadder a failure is that everyone involved must have sincerely felt they were doing the Lord's work, care and concern going hand in hand with an almost total miscalculation of mood. Even Robin Williams, so lively a voice in Aladdin, is on beatific automatic pilot here, preferring to be warm and cuddly when a little of his energy (paradoxically on splendid display in the film's teaser trailer) is desperately called for. The Grinch Who Stole Christmas seems to have stripped the life from this film as well, leaving a pretty shell, expensive but hollow, in its place."

Peter Travers wrote in Rolling Stone, "To cut Toys a minor break, it is ambitious. It is also a gimmicky, obvious and pious bore, not to mention overproduced and overlong."

== Home media ==
The film was released on VHS and LaserDisc in 1993 and DVD on October 16, 2001.

== Video game ==
A video game based on the film, Toys: Let the Toy Wars Begin!, was released in 1993 for the Super NES and Genesis platforms by Absolute Entertainment. The game is played from an isometric perspective, and involves the player, as Leslie, attempting to destroy the elephant-head security cameras in the factory, cafeteria and warehouse levels to shut down those defenses. When the player gets to the Manhattan model, the game switches to a side-scrolling stage in which the player must fly all the way to General Leland Zevo's control center, shut down the production of the war toys, and save the good name of Zevo Toys.
