= The Meaning of Night (painting) =

1927 painting by René Magritte

- Artist: René Magritte
- Year: 1927
- Medium: Oil on canvas
- Dimensions: 139 cm × 105 cm (55 in × 41 in)
- Location: Menil Collection; Houston

The Meaning of Night is a painting by the Belgian Surrealist René Magritte. Painted in 1927, it is an oil painting on canvas with dimensions 139 cm by 105 cm and is in the Menil Collection, Houston.

== Description ==
The canvas depicts two identically dressed men, wearing coats and bowler hats, standing with their backs to each other. They are in a seaside landscape dominated by a dark sky. While small clouds litter the ground, a shapeless gray mass where only a glove is recognizable appears to float in the air next to the two men; the one that faces the viewer has his eyes closed and his hands in his pockets.

== See also ==
- List of paintings by René Magritte
