= The Good Example =

1953 oil on canvas painting by René Magritte

The Good Example (French: Le Bon Exemple) is a 1953 oil on canvas painting by René Magritte, part of the collection of the Musée National d'Art Moderne in Paris but stored and displayed at the Museum of Grenoble since 28 April 2004. It is a standing portrait of the art dealer Alexandre Iolas, holding an umbrella. Under him is the inscription "Personnage assis" (seated figure).

== See also ==
- List of paintings by René Magritte
