= The Tempter =

The Tempter may refer to:

- The Antichrist (film), 1974 Italian horror film also released as The Tempter
- The Devil Is a Woman (1974 film), 1974 Italian-British film released in UK as The Tempter
- The Seducer, a painting by Magritte originally Le Séducteur, sometimes translated as The Tempter

== See also ==
- Tempter (album), a 1993 album by the Dutch death metal band Nembrionic Hammerdeath
