= The Adulation of Space =

Painting by René Magritte

- L’éloge de l’espace (French)
- Artist: René Magritte
- Year: 1927-28
- Medium: Oil on canvas
- Dimensions: 81 cm × 116 cm (32 in × 46 in)
- Owner: Private collection

The Adulation of Space (French: L'éloge de l'espace) is an oil on canvas painting by Belgian surrealist artist René Magritte, created in 1927–1928. It is held in a private collection.

The enigmatic title of the work, as with the majority of Magritte's, was suggested by one of his friends – the Surrealist poet Paul Nougé. In 1943 Nougé produced a monograph on Magritte in which he wrote about the present painting: ‘One muses over the identical objects, over the possible repetition of the more unusual of them, over the way things have of filling the expanse and the sudden apparition of the terrifying masks of “the end of contemplation” and the women's bodies closely entwined, which represents “the adulation of space”’.

Magritte’s idiosyncratic form of Surrealism emerged in the middle of the 1920s, following a short flirtation with Cubist and Futurist art. The Surrealist techniques and mechanisms espoused by André Breton and his followers were primarily concerned with elucidating dream-like imagery and manifesting the sub-conscious. Magritte's approach eschewed these notions; his art would be wholly rational, and informed by ‘lines of research’, which Paul Nougé categorised as ‘isolation of an object by the frame or some other means; more or less apparent distortion; modification of the substance of the object; change of scale; change of décor’. In The Adulation of Space Magritte has introduced several of these types of manipulation. The repoussoir effect of the amorphic grey structure surrounding the figures frames the truncated forms and obscures the viewer's perception of scale. Other works from the late 1920s such as La Démon de la perversité and Découverte similarly pervert the natural scale and appearance of objects, whilst retaining an incontrovertible sense of rationality which is preserved by Magritte's trompe l’œil technique.

In 1920 Magritte was introduced to Edouard Léon Théodore Mesens by their mutual acquaintance Karel Maes at the first exhibition of the artist's Cubo-Futurist work organised by the Centre d’Art in Brussels. Mesens was a man of numerous talents and occupations – a musician, poet, critic and gallerist – who was to become Magritte's most vociferous supporter and promoter. In the mid-1920s Mesens and Magritte published the short-lived reviews Œsophage and Marie and contributed to the last edition of Francis Picabia's Dadaist revue 391. Having partly abandoned his musical career Mesens set about selling and promoting avant-garde art, first at the Galerie Manteau, and later at Paul-Gustave van Hecke's Galerie L’Epoque in Brussels. Mesens and Van Hecke became the principal dealers in Magritte's work, and as such they sold The Adulation of Space to the fated Galerie Le Centaure in 1929. Soon after the sale the Galerie Le Centaure was forced to close and the stock liquidated and Mesens was able to buy a number of paintings, including the present work. In 1938 Mesens left Belgium and opened The London Gallery (backed by Roland Penrose), with a debut solo exhibition of Magritte's greatest and latest works. Although the gallery closed in 1950, Mesens continued to champion his friend's work and retained a large collection of his most important paintings for his own pleasure. The Adulation of Space has remained with his family until the present day.

== See also ==
- List of paintings by René Magritte
