= The Alarm Clock (painting) =

Painting by René Magritte

- Artist: René Magritte
- Year: 1957
- Medium: Oil on canvas
- Dimensions: 62.5 cm × 52 cm (24.6 in × 20 in)
- Location: Private collection

The Alarm Clock (French: Le Réveil-matin or Le Revéille-matin) is an oil-on-canvas painting by the Belgian surrealist René Magritte, completed in 1957. It is held at a private collection. It depicts a painting inside the painting, depicting a bowl with several apples, upside down, on a table. A landscape appears as a background.

== See also ==
- List of paintings by René Magritte
