= Human condition (disambiguation) =

The human condition is the experience of existence and life as humans.

(The) human condition may also refer to:

== Philosophy ==
- The Human Condition (Arendt book), a 1958 book by political theorist Hannah Arendt

== Literature ==
- The Human Condition (Gomikawa novel), a 1958 six-part Japanese novel by Junpei Gomikawa
- La condition humaine (English title: Man's Fate), a 1933 novel by André Malraux

== Visual culture ==
- The Human Condition (Magritte), four paintings, 1933, 1935, 1935, and 1945, by surrealist painter René Magritte
- The Human Condition (film series), a film trilogy based on Gomikawa's novel and directed by Masaki Kobayashi
- The Human Condition (TV series), Korean TV program

== Music ==
- The Human Condition (Saga album), 2009
- The Human Condition (Man Must Die album), 2007
- The Human Condition (Jon Bellion album), 2016
- The Human Condition (Black Stone Cherry album), 2020
- Human Conditions, music album by Richard Ashcroft
- Exhibit B: The Human Condition, a 2010 album by Exodus
- The Human Condition, short-lived band featuring electric bassist Jah Wobble

== See also ==
- Books of Blood#"The Inhuman Condition", story and play by Clive Barker in the Fourth Book of Blood, which was published under that title in the US
- The Inhuman Condition an album by Sam Roberts
