= Toys (video game) =

1993 video game

- Genesis box art
- Developer: Imagineering
- Publisher: Absolute Entertainment
- Producers: David Crane; Alex DeMeo
- Designers: David Crane; Alex DeMeo
- Programmers: SNES; Jason Benham; Bill Jannott; Ron Roberts; Genesis; Dennis Benson; Michael Fernie; Mark Morris; Chris Will
- Artists: Jesse Kapili; Ross Harris
- Composer: Mark Van Hecke
- Platforms: Super NES, Genesis
- Release: Genesis: NA: June 1993; Super NES: EU: 1993; NA: April 1993
- Genre: Action
- Mode: Single-player

Toys (also known as Toys: Let the Toy Wars Begin!) is an action video game for the Super NES and Sega Genesis released in 1993. The game is based on the 1992 film Toys starring Robin Williams. Chaos has been spread at a toy factory that must be stopped by the player.

== Plot ==
An irresponsible young man (Leslie Zevo) would not take over the company and now his father is dying. In order to get his young adult son to accept his new responsibilities, the father must force him to reclaim his toy factory from a strait-laced Army general (Lt. General Leland) that he has appointed as part of a "test of maturity".

== Gameplay ==
Players can destroy a variety of toys with their weapons, including Jeeps and combat helicopters.

Players are involved in a "toy war" between an army of military-style toys fought with a personalized action figure army using toys found in certain places in the game. The player will start each level only possessing a limited supply of toys, whereas the general will have a virtually unlimited supply of toys to throw at the player. These toys range from the realistic (bowling balls) to the cartoonish (i.e., peanut gun projectiles, radio-controlled cars, water balloons). Crashing a toy plane into General Zevo's windows allows players to beat the game. However, they have to navigate the plane through a scale model of Manhattan and avoid running out of power.

== Reception ==
Reception

Review scores
Publication	Score
GamePro	3.8/5 stars
Mega	20%

Mega described the game as "a poor quality game using a film licence for a plot", and giving the addiction factor 1/10.

The game was included in an episode of Wez and Larry's Top Tens (In this case, "Top Ten Worst Movie Licences") and came 4th. It was described by Larry as "mind-numbingly monotonous", and he ended the slot by saying: "This is one 'toy' that you definitely want to keep out of the reach of small children."
