= The Palace of Memories =

1939 painting by René Magritte

- Artist: René Magritte
- Year: 1939
- Medium: Oil on canvas
- Dimensions: 46.2 cm × 38.2 cm (18.2 in × 15.0 in)
- Owner: Private collection

The Palace of Memories (French: Le palais des souvenirs) is an oil on canvas painting created by Belgian surrealist artist René Magritte, from 1939. It is held in a private collection.

In The Palace of Memories, René Magritte plunges the viewer into a scene of infinite mystery: underneath and beyond a theatre curtain is a vast, rocky landscape of crags stretching into the distance. Looking like a crater filled with lava and dominating that vista is a rock formation that resembles Magritte's images of chopped trees which would emerge in 1951 in The Work of Alexander. This introduces the theme of petrification that would recur in Magritte's art, the notion of the transformation between the elements as seen in his 1936 work, Le précurseur, in which a mountain range resembles an eagle. In The Palace of Memories, the pool of red within the crater adds another dimension to this switch between animal, vegetable and mineral. Meanwhile, against the curtain itself, hovering in the foreground, is a bunch of blue flowers which reminds us of some heraldic motif. This picture was formerly owned by Simon Harcourt-Smith, a diplomat and author whose father, Sir Cecil, had been the first director of the Victoria and Albert Museum, London, as well as a key advisor to the Royal Collection.

The Palace of Memories was painted in 1939, and as such appears to be the first of a string of works in which Magritte explored the theme of the landscape behind a theatre curtain. Indeed, this marked a new entry of the curtain into Magritte's compositions: formerly, curtains tended to be shown either in the context of a window or as stand-alone objects in a landscape. This had been the case in The Poetic World, a work from the 1920s which Magritte had revisited, creating a new version for Edward James in 1937. Perhaps this had brought the theme of the curtain back to Magritte's mind. Certainly, in 1940, he would return to the stage curtain device in The Beauty of Night, in which a landscape reminiscent of the flatter parts of Belgium or of Holland is shown, allowing the sky to dominate the composition. Another oil from the same year, Le spectacle de la nature, shows another country scene beyond the curtain: two trees in a lush, verdant prairie; that picture is now in the Pinakothek der Moderne, Munich, where it forms part of the Theo Wormland Collection. In that picture, in place of the flowers in The Palace of Memories floats a solitary leaf.

The fact that these pictures were signed by the artist in 1940 implies that The Palace of Memories, which was dated ‘1939’, may have been painted towards the end of that year. This was a momentous turning point in the life of Magritte and in the history of much of the world as well, as it marked the beginning of the Second World War. The Palace of Memories may thus date from after the declaration of war, yet before the invasion of Belgium and its subsequent Occupation, which began in May the following year. Perhaps, then, The Palace of Memories was painted against the backdrop of the drôle de guerre, the ‘Phoney War’, when little military action was taking place yet many of the nations of Europe were clearly pitted against each other. The Second World War would come to inspire Magritte to negotiate new means of representing his Surreal vision: he sought to respond to the conflict in a number of ways, often expunging any overbearing sense of the psychological oppression that was so naturally caused by it. In The Palace of Memories, by contrast, the sombre tone of the landscape underneath the curtain may hint at his own anxieties. At the same time, the theatrical posturing of the various nations may have helped to inspire the theatrical theme.

In The Palace of Memories, the fact that the curtain implies some infinite theatre hints at a new way of looking at life itself. In this way, it chimes with Magritte's constant quest to bring about an epiphany in his viewers, to point them towards a new understanding of the magical and mysterious qualities of the world around us. Everything, Magritte appears to be saying, is spectacle. Everything is illusion.

Magritte's use of the curtain in this picture invoked a device that had been employed by a number of the Old Masters as a trompe-l'oeil way of drawing the viewer into the composition, pointing to the artifice of the scene, and also showcasing their own ability to paint something as lifelike as the drapery hanging in front of a picture; this was the case, for example, in several of the pictures of Johannes Vermeer. Magritte's play with the nature of the picture surface was given great scope by his use of similar devices, be it in the bunched stage curtain of The Palace of Memories, the velvet backdrop of The Plagiarism, pierced by the landscape-silhouette of the flowers dominating the composition, or even the numerous images of naked women next to long curtains such as La chambre de la fée and The Magnet.

In those pictures, Magritte reintroduced the theme of the nude which he had explored in his earlier painting, Black Magic, but added this curtain element, playing with the various implied textures of the elements depicted. Magritte appears to have used the curtain device again and again after introducing it in The Palace of Memories. In it, he had found a means of adding a level of dialogue concerning the entire nature of art, of representation and of painting. By creating a perspectival landscape of seemingly colossal proportions in the background, with the curtain in the foreground, Magritte is deliberately bringing our attention to the entire process of imitation that underpins the act of painting itself. He is pointing to the artifice of his own profession, celebrating it. And the flowers floating in the foreground add a garnish, a flash of flair, that both emphasises and finalises this process of revelation.

== See also ==
- List of paintings by René Magritte
