= The False Mirror =

1929 painting by René Magritte

- Artist: René Magritte
- Year: 1929
- Medium: Oil on canvas
- Dimensions: 54 cm × 80.9 cm (21 in × 31.9 in)
- Location: Museum of Modern Art, New York

The False Mirror is a surrealist oil on canvas painting by René Magritte, from 1929. It depicts a human eye framing a cloudy, blue sky. In the depiction of the eye in the painting, the clouds take the place normally occupied by the iris. The painting's original French title is Le faux miroir.

== Provenance ==
Magritte painted three versions of Le faux miroir.

The original version of The False Mirror was painted at Le Perreux-sur-Marne, France in 1929. Between 1933 and 1936 it was owned by the surrealist photographer Man Ray. The painting was purchased from Man Ray by the Museum of Modern Art in New York. It has remained in the MOMA permanent in collection since its purchase.

Magritte painted a second version of The False Mirror in 1935. The oil on canvas work, sized 19 × 27 cm, is in a private collection.

A gouache on paper version of The False Mirror, executed by Magritte in 1952, sold at auction in 2010 for GBP 373,250.

== In popular culture ==
The painting is said to be one of the inspirations for the 1952 CBS television "eye" logo designed by William Golden.

Vaporwave producer Eco Virtual used this painting as the album cover on their second album, ATMOSPHERES 第2 (2014).

== See also ==
- List of paintings by René Magritte
- 1929 in art
