= The Mysteries of the Horizon =

Painting by René Magritte

- Artist: René Magritte
- Year: 1955
- Medium: Oil on canvas
- Dimensions: 50 cm × 65 cm (19.69 in × 25.59 in)
- Owner: Private collection

The Masterpiece or The Mysteries of the Horizon (French: Le Chef-d'Oeuvre ou Les mystères de l'horizon) is a 1955 Surrealist oil painting by René Magritte. It is held in a private collection.

The painting depicts three seemingly identical men in bowler hats. They are in an outdoor setting at twilight. Though they appear to be sharing the same space each one also seems to exist in a separate reality. Each is facing a different direction. In the sky above each figure is a separate waxing crescent moon.

Men in bowler hats appear frequently in Magritte's work starting with his 1926 painting The Musings of a Solitary Walker. They are represented as having undefined or identical personalities. Magritte himself is often seen wearing a bowler hat in photographs.

Magritte made a gouache in 1964 with the same subject matter, also titled Le Chef-d'Oeuvre ou les Mystères de l'Horizon (The Masterpiece or the Mysteries of the Horizon)

The painting has been parodied many times, including by surrealist comedy group the Firesign Theatre on the cover of their 1977 album Just Folks... A Firesign Chat. On the parody, each member of the Firesign Theatre appears wearing a different tie but identical suits and hats. Something strange is happening to three of the four hats: one is on fire; only one has the crescent Moon above his head, and he is smoking a pipe; another's hat appears to be floating above his head. One smiles at the viewer, and there is nothing unusual about his hat.

== See also ==
- List of paintings by René Magritte
