= The Menaced Assassin =

1927 painting by René Magritte

- L'Assassin menacé (French)
- Artist: René Magritte
- Year: 1927
- Medium: Oil on canvas
- Dimensions: 150.4 cm × 195.2 cm (59.2 in × 76.9 in)
- Location: Museum of Modern Art, New York
- Accession: 247.1966

The Menaced Assassin (French: L'Assassin menacé) is a 1927 oil-on-canvas painting by Belgian surrealist artist René Magritte. It is held at the Museum of Modern Art, in New York.

== Description ==
The main subject of the painting is a blood-smeared nude woman, seen lying on a couch. The assassin of the painting's title, a well-dressed man, stands ready to leave, his coat and hat on a chair next to his bag. He is however delayed by the sound of music, and in an unhurriedly relaxed manner, listens to a gramophone. In the meantime, two men armed with club and net wait in the foyer to ensnare him, as three more men also watch from over the balcony. Outside, we can see snowy mountains. It is an enigmatic and macabre painting at first glance, typical of Magritte style.

== See also ==
- List of paintings by René Magritte
- 1927 in art
