= Time Transfixed =

Painting by René Magritte

- La durée poignardée (French)
- Artist: René Magritte
- Year: 1938
- Medium: Oil on canvas
- Dimensions: 147 cm × 98.7 cm (58 in × 38.9 in)
- Location: Art Institute of Chicago, Chicago

Time Transfixed (French: La durée poignardée) is a 1938 oil on canvas painting by the Belgian surrealist René Magritte. It is part of the permanent collection of the Art Institute of Chicago and is usually on display in the museum's Modern Wing.

The painting was one of many done for surrealist patron and Magritte supporter Edward James. This was the second painting delivered to James for his London ballroom. The first was the portrait of James, Not to be Reproduced. Time Transfixed was purchased by the Art Institute from James in 1970 when he was raising capital to build his surrealist sculpture garden Las Pozas.

The painting depicts an LMS Stanier 5MT Black 5 4-6-0 Locomotive jutting out of a fireplace, at full steam, in an empty room. Above the mantelpiece is a tall mirror. Only the clock and one of two candlesticks standing on the mantelpiece are reflected in the mirror.

Like other Surrealist artists, René Magritte was influenced by Freud's psychoanalytic theories. Time Transfixed has been interpreted as an example of the Freudian concept of the uncanny.

== The artist's perspective ==
The title of the painting translates to English literally as Ongoing Time Stabbed by a Dagger, and Magritte was reportedly unhappy with the generally accepted translation of Time Transfixed. Magritte hoped that James would hang the painting at the base of his staircase so that the train would "stab" guests on their way up to the ballroom. James instead chose to hang the painting above his own fireplace.

Magritte described his motivation for this painting:

I decided to paint the image of a locomotive ... In order for its mystery to be evoked, another immediately familiar image without mystery—the image of a dining room fireplace—was joined.

== See also ==
- List of paintings by René Magritte
- 1938 in art
