= The Telescope (Magritte) =

Painting by René Magritte

- Artist: René Magritte
- Year: 1963
- Medium: Oil on canvas
- Dimensions: 176.1 cm × 114.9 cm (69 5/16 in × 45 1/4 in)
- Location: Menil Collection; Houston

The Telescope (French: La lunette d'approche) is a 1963 oil on canvas painting by René Magritte.

The painting depicts a window through which a partly clouded blue sky can be seen. However, the right side of the window is partially open, revealing a black background where the viewer would expect to see a continuation of the clouds and sky.

== See also ==
- List of paintings by René Magritte
- 1963 in art
