= The Empty Mask =

Painting by René Magritte

- Le Masque vide (French)
- Artist: René Magritte
- Year: 1928
- Medium: Oil on canvas
- Dimensions: 81.2 cm × 116.2 cm (32.0 in × 45 3/4 in)
- Location: National Museum Cardiff, Cardiff

The Empty Mask (French: Le Masque vide) is an oil on canvas painting by Belgian surrealist painter René Magritte, from 1928. The painting was purchased in 1973 and is on display in the National Museum of Wales, in Cardiff.

Magritte suggested in his essay Words and Images (1929) concerning this painting that each image represented "suggests that there are others behind it". The six images depicted in freestanding frame of irregular shape, are the sky, a lead curtain festooned with sleigh bells, a house façade, a sheet of paper cut-outs, a forest and a fire.

The title reflects the artists fascination with the subconscious.

== See also ==
- List of paintings by René Magritte
- 1928 in art
