= The Seducer =

Painting by René Magritte

- Artist: René Magritte
- Year: 1950
- Dimensions: 38 cm × 46 cm (15 in × 18 in)

The Seducer (Le Séducteur, also known as The Tempter) is a surrealist painting by René Magritte. It was created in 1950 and again in 1953 in Brussels, Belgium. The 1950 version is held by the Virginia Museum of Fine Arts and the 1953 version is in a private collection. Other versions were created in 1951.

The painting portrays a fully rigged sailing ship on the sea against a blue sky: the silhouette of the ship is infilled with a continuation of the waves of the sea. The painting measures 38 cm × 46 cm (15 in × 18 in). It features dark blue and light blue colours.

== See also ==
- List of paintings by René Magritte
