= Bowler hat =

Hard, round-crowned hat with a narrow rolled brim

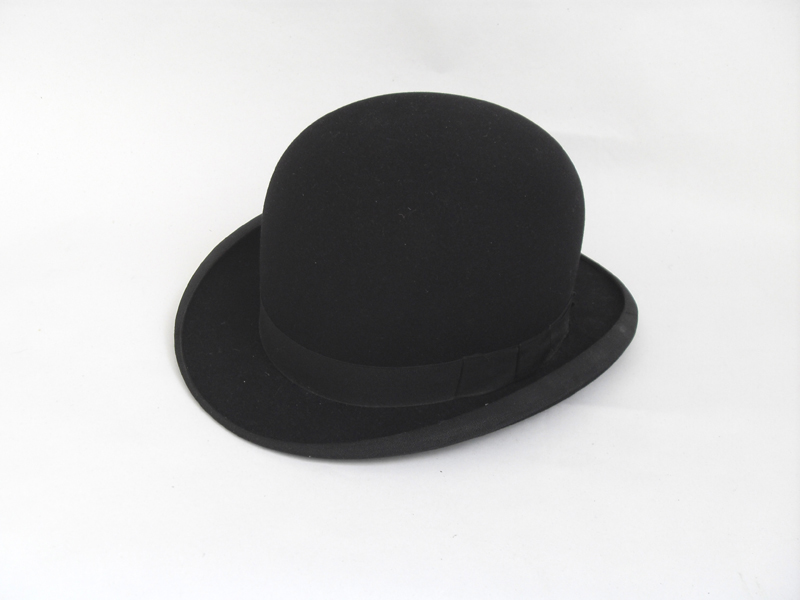
Bowler hat, mid-20th century (PFF collection)

The bowler hat, also known as a Coke hat, billycock, bob hat, or derby (United States), is a hard felt hat with a rounded crown, originally created by the London hat-makers Thomas and William Bowler in 1849 and commissioned by Lock & Co. Hatters of St James's Street, London. It has traditionally been worn with semi-formal and informal attire.

The bowler, a protective and durable hat style, was popular with the British, Irish, and American working classes during the second half of the 19th century, and later with the middle and upper classes in the United Kingdom, Ireland, and the east coast of the United States. It became the quintessential attire of City of London gents in the early 1900s, a tradition that lasted until the 1970s.

== Origins ==
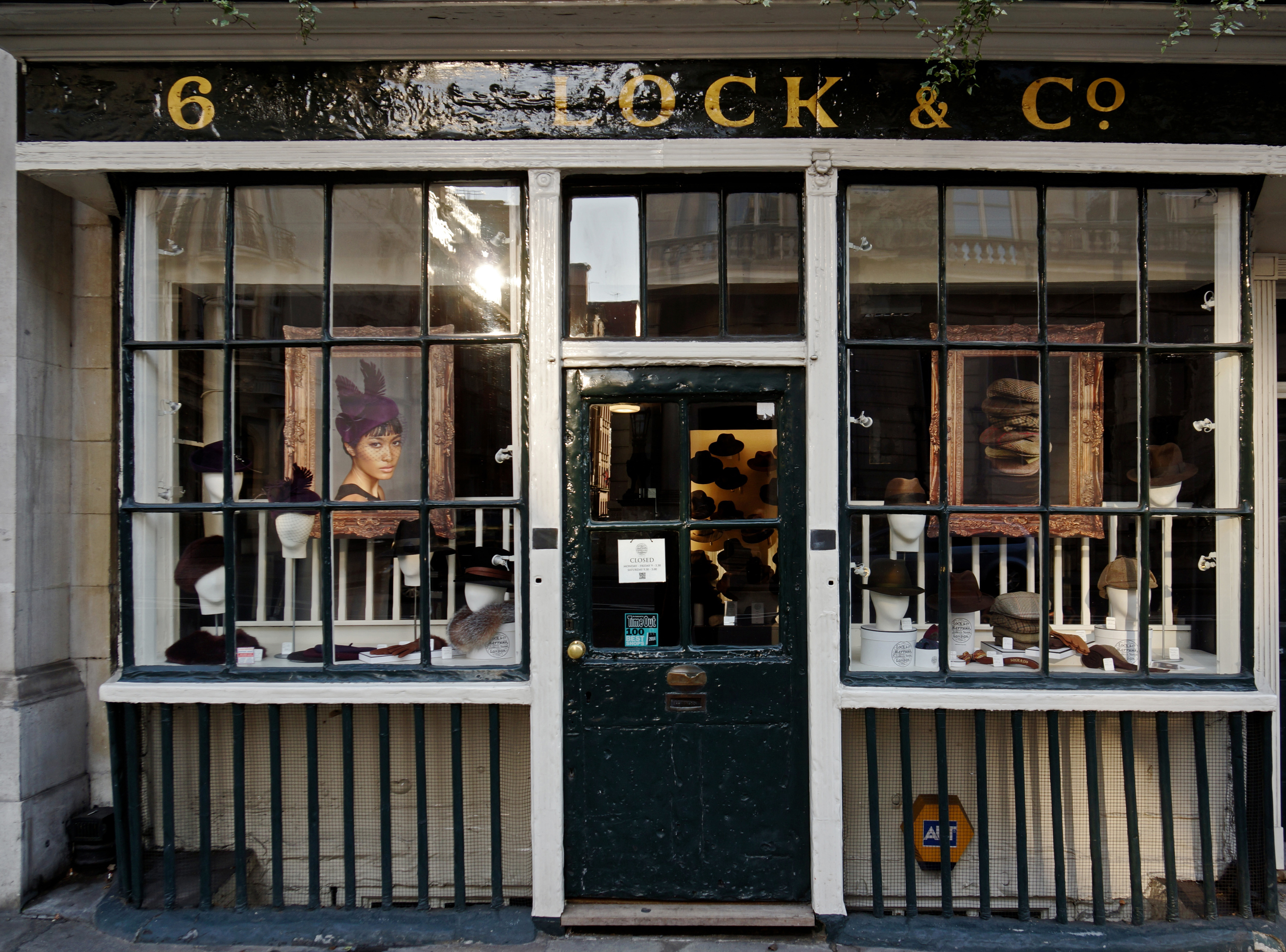
Lock & Co. Hatters, St James's Street, London where the first bowler was sold in 1849

The billycock hat, using a similar design to the bowler, dates (as recorded in the form "bully-cocked hat") from at least 1721.

The archetypal bowler hat was designed in 1849 by the London hat-makers Thomas and William Bowler to fulfill an order placed by the company of hatters James Lock & Co. of St James's, which had been commissioned by a customer to design a close-fitting, low-crowned hat to protect gamekeepers from low-hanging branches while on horseback. The keepers had previously worn top hats, which were knocked off easily and damaged.

The identity of the customer is less certain, with some suggesting it was Thomas Coke, 1st Earl of Leicester (1754–1842), who had an estate at Holkham Hall in Norfolk. However, research performed by a younger relation of the 1st Earl casts doubt on this story, and James Lock & Co. claim that the bowler was invented for Edward Coke (1824–1889), the younger brother of Thomas Coke, 2nd Earl of Leicester. When Edward Coke arrived in London on 17 December 1849 to collect his hat he reputedly placed it on the floor and stamped hard on it twice to test its strength; the hat withstood this test and Coke paid 12 shillings for it.

== Cultural significance in the British Isles ==
The bowler has had varying degrees of significance in British culture. They were popular among the working classes in the 19th century. From the early 20th century, bowler hats were more commonly associated with financial workers and businessmen working in London's financial district, the City of London, who were also known as "City gents". According to The Daily Telegraph, "The hat was adopted by City workers in the early 1900s and teamed with a coronation [sic] buttonhole and walking stick to give the impression of sophistication". The traditional wearing of bowler hats with City business attire declined during the 1970s. In modern times bowlers are not common, although the so-called City gent wearing a bowler and carrying a rolled umbrella remains a representation of Englishmen. For this reason, two bowler-hatted men were used in the logo of the British building society (subsequently bank) Bradford & Bingley.

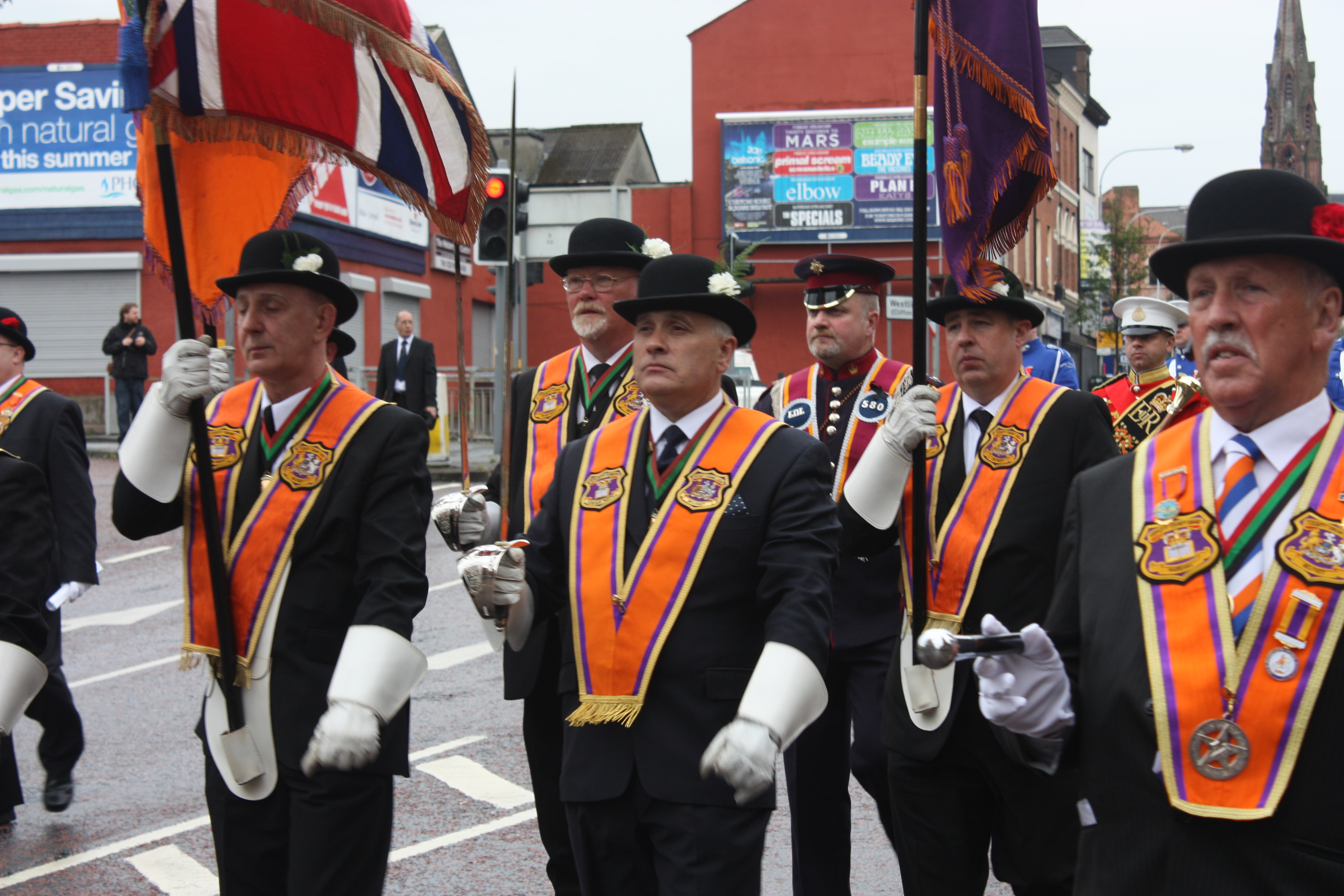
Members of the Orange Order wearing bowler hats while celebrating The Twelfth, Belfast 2011

In Scotland and Northern Ireland the bowler hat is worn traditionally by members of the main Loyalist fraternities such as the Orange Order, the Independent Loyal Orange Institution, the Royal Black Preceptory and the Apprentice Boys of Derry for their parades and annual celebrations.

Female officers of many British police forces also wear bowler hats as part of their uniforms. This includes a cap badge and generally has a black-and-white chequered band (called Sillitoe tartan) around the hat. Bowlers worn by female traffic police officers have white crowns or covers. These hats are not worn in the Police Service of Northern Ireland.

They are also part of the uniforms of female police community support officers (PCSOs).

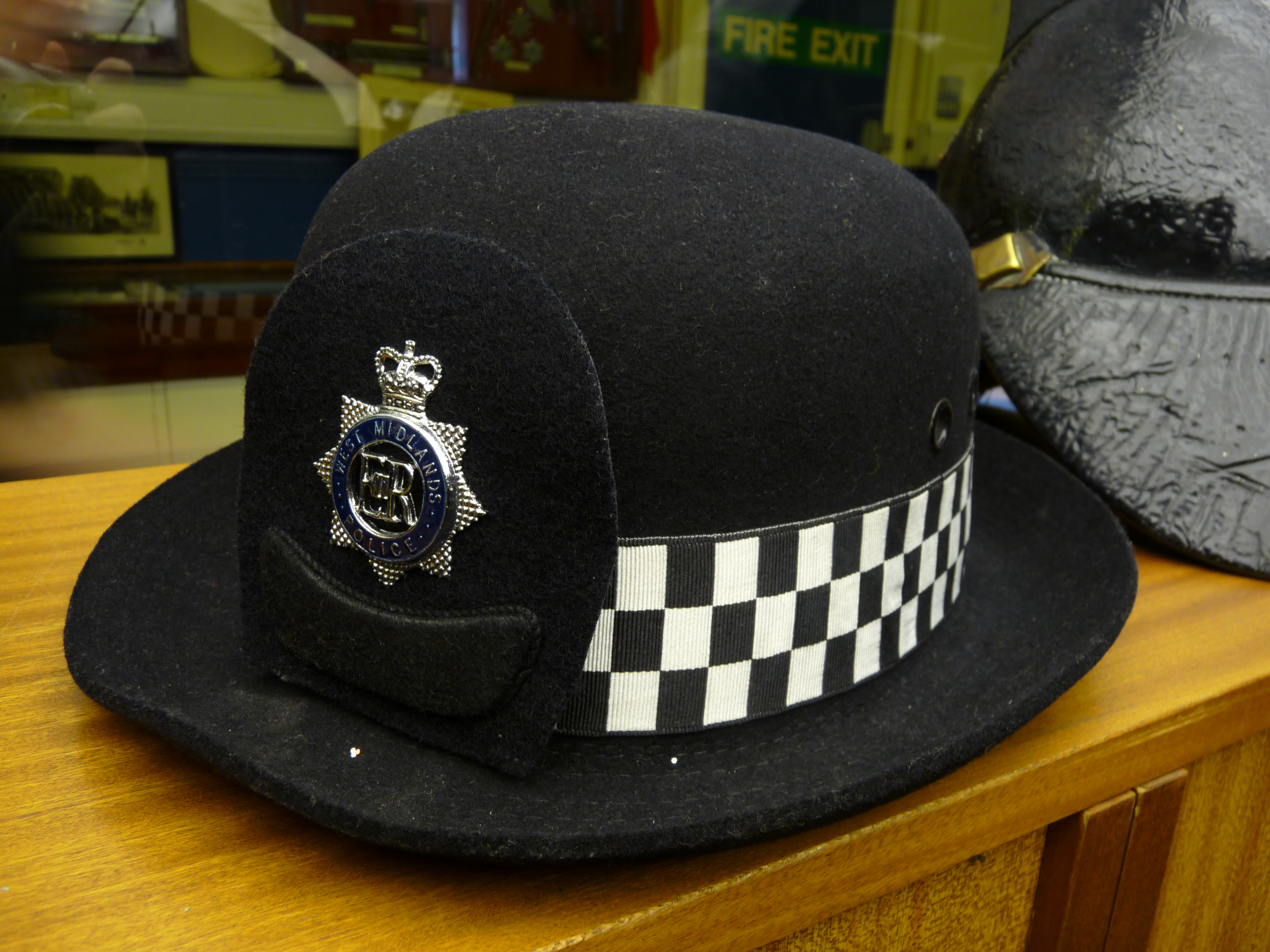
A typical bowler hat of female British police officers

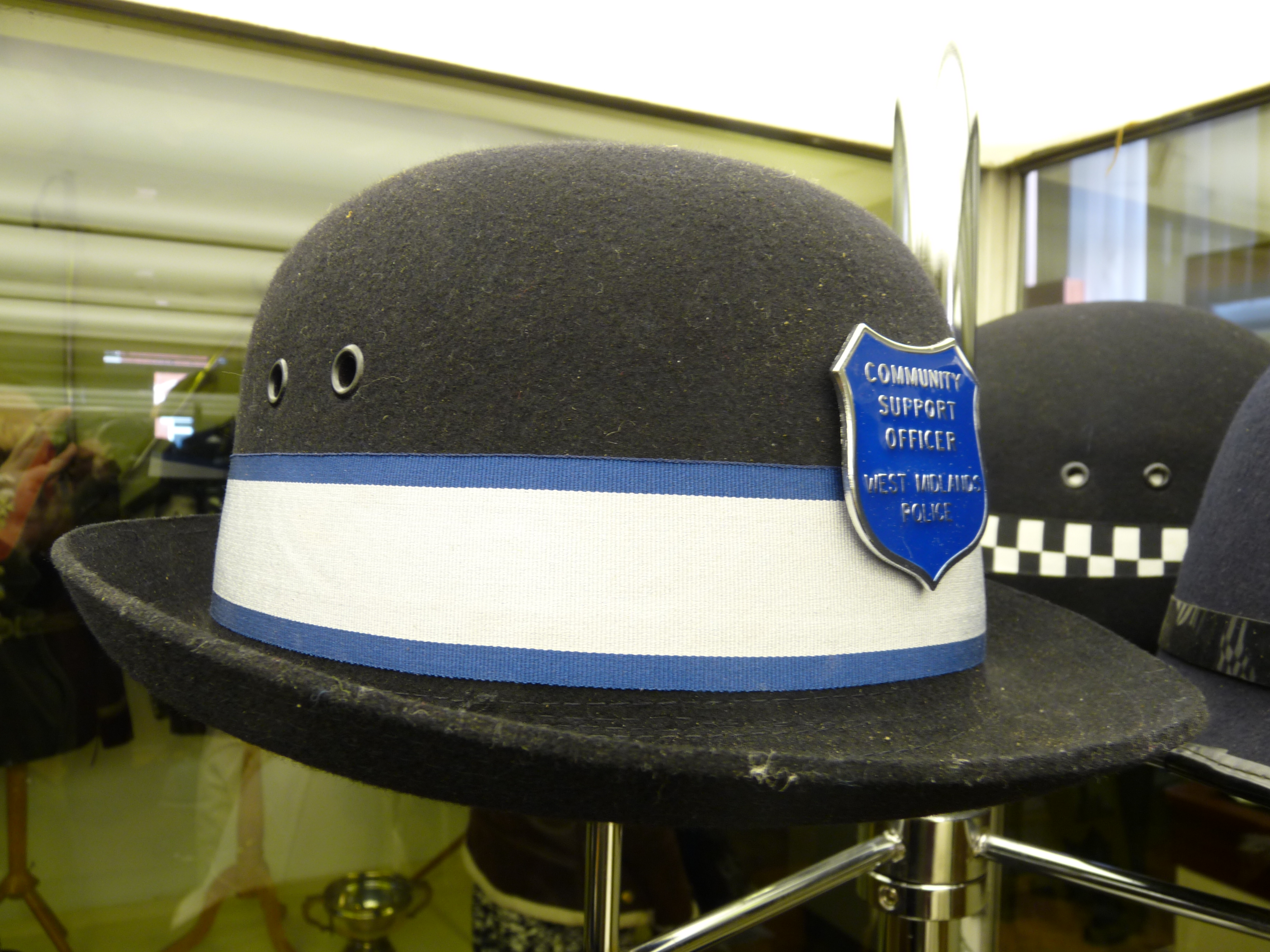
A typical bowler of female PCSOs in the UK

== Outside the British Isles ==
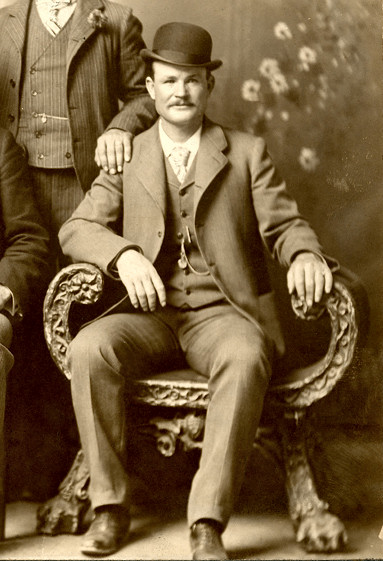
Butch Cassidy c. 1900

The bowler was the most popular hat in the American West, prompting Lucius Beebe to call it "the hat that won the West". Both cowboys and railroad workers preferred the hat because it would not blow off easily in strong wind while riding a horse, or when sticking one's head out the window of a speeding train. It was worn by both lawmen and outlaws, including Bat Masterson, Butch Cassidy, Black Bart, and Billy the Kid. In the United States the hat came to be known commonly as the derby, and American outlaw Marion Hedgepeth was commonly referred to as "the Derby Kid".

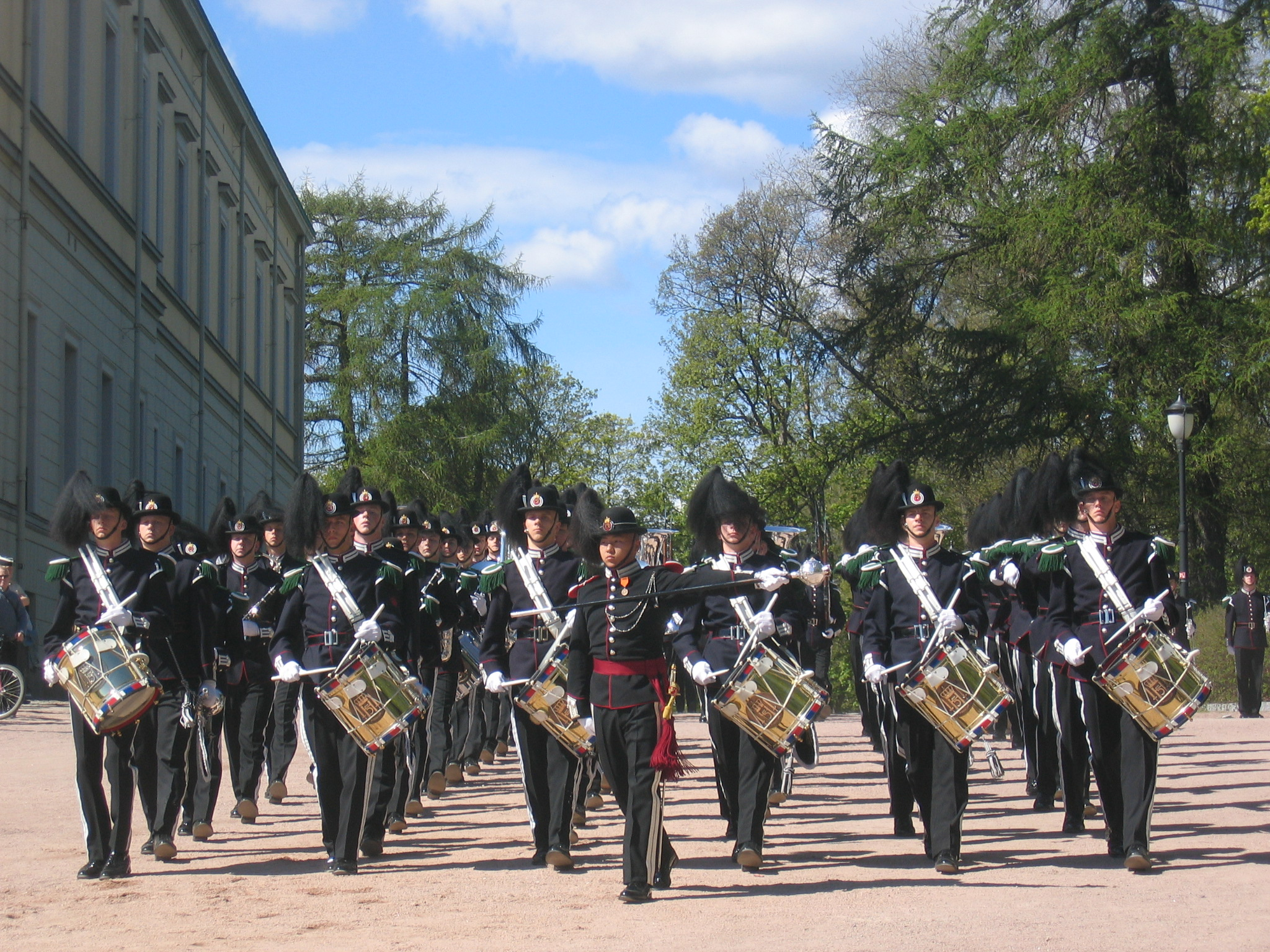
Band of His Majesty The King's Royal Guard, in Oslo, Norway

In Norway, Hans Majestet Kongens Garde (the royal guards) wear plumed bowler hats as part of their uniform. It was copied from the hats of the Italian Bersaglieri troops; a regiment that so impressed the Swedish princess Louise that she insisted the Norwegian guards be similarly hatted in 1860.

In the Philippines, bowler hats were known by its Spanish name sombrero hongo (literally "mushroom hat"). Along with the native buntal hats, they were a common part of the traditional men's ensemble of the barong tagalog during the second half of the 19th century.

The bowler hat was worn by the national hero of the Philippines, José Rizal, during his execution on 30 December 1896, and it is still seen as symbolic of the history of the Philippine Revolution.

=== South America ===
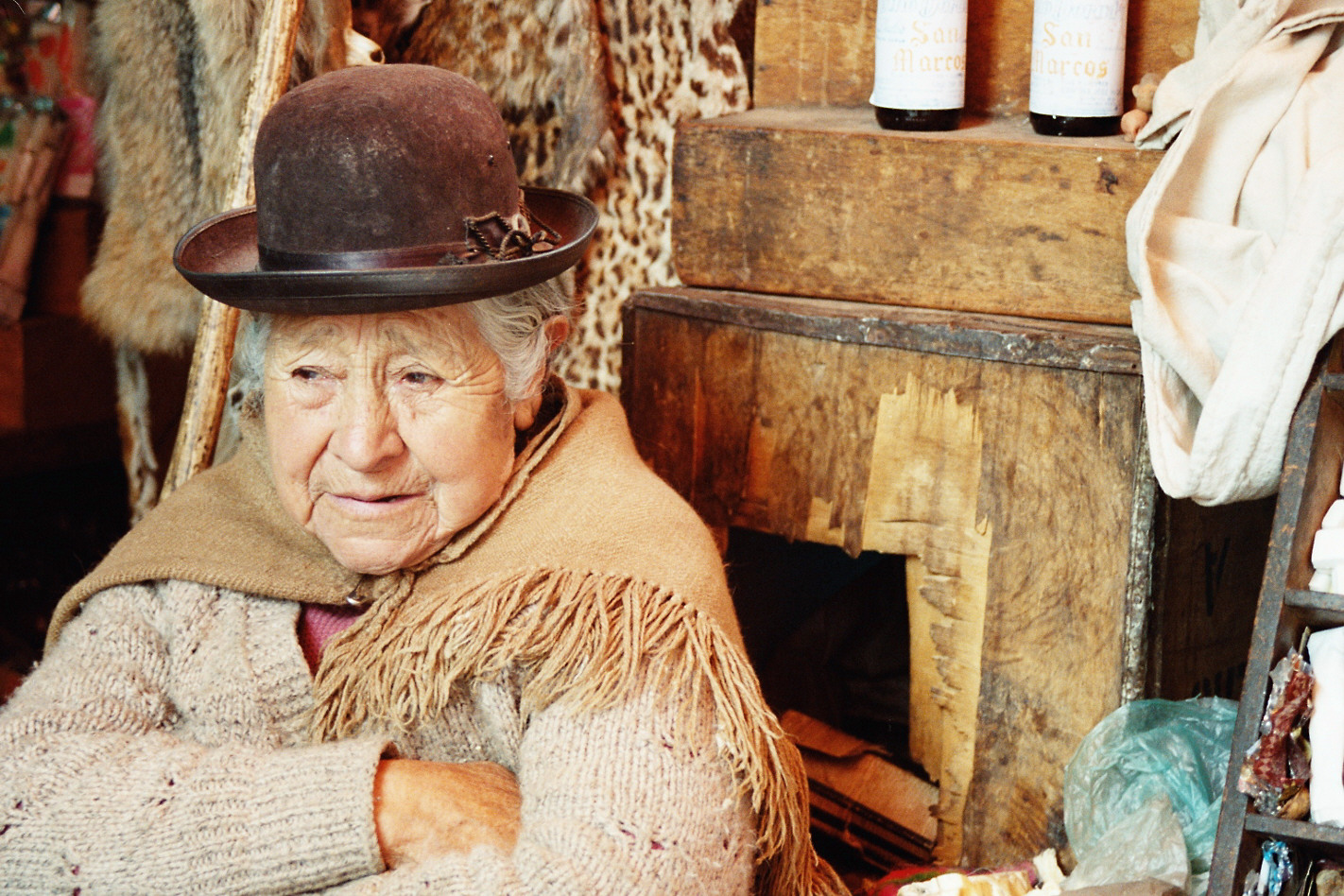
The bowler hat was introduced as part of Pollera womenswear among the Quechua and Aymara peoples of South America in the early 20th century.

In South America, the bowler, known as bombín in Spanish, has been worn by pollera women and indigenous Quechua and Aymara women since the 1920s, when it was introduced to Bolivia by British railway workers. For many years, a factory in Italy manufactured such hats for the Bolivian market, but they are now made locally.

== In popular culture ==
- The bowler hat was famously used by actors such as Charlie Chaplin, Laurel and Hardy, Shemp Howard and Curly Howard; and by the fictional character John Steed of The Avengers, played by Patrick Macnee, who wore a variety of bowler hats throughout the series. In the 1964 film Mary Poppins, set in Edwardian London, 1910, the London banker George Banks (played by David Tomlinson) wears a bowler.
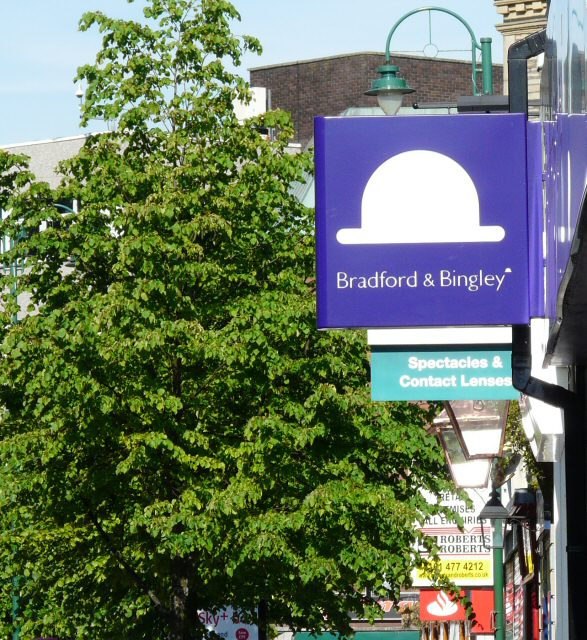
- Bradford & Bingley logo (pictured in 2009) outside a branch in Manchester, England
  The British bank Bradford & Bingley owns more than 100 separate trademarks featuring the bowler hat, its long-running logo. In 1995, the bank purchased, for £2000, a bowler hat which had once belonged to Stan Laurel.
- The bowler is part of the Droog outfit that main character Alex wears in the film version of A Clockwork Orange to the extent that contemporary fancy dress costumes for this character refer to the bowler hat.
- There was a chain of restaurants in Los Angeles, California known as The Brown Derby. The first and most famous of these was shaped like a derby.
- Many paintings by the Belgian surrealist artist René Magritte feature bowler hats. The Son of Man consists of a man in a bowler hat standing in front of a wall. The man's face is largely obscured by a hovering green apple. Golconda depicts "raining men" all wearing bowler hats.
- Choreographer Bob Fosse frequently incorporated bowler hats into his dance routines. This use of hats as props, as seen in the 1972 movie Cabaret, would become one of his trademarks.
- In the 2007 Disney animated film Meet the Robinsons, the main antagonist is known as the Bowler Hat Guy, played by director Stephen Anderson.
- In The Adventures of Rocky and Bullwinkle and Friends cartoon series, the legendary "Kerwood Derby" was worn by such world conquerors as Alexander the Great and Elvis Presley (a play on the name of then popular TV personality Durward Kirby).
- In the mid-1960s Batman TV series, the Penguin's band of "fine feathered finks" usually wear derby hats.
- There is a giant bowler hat along I-30 in south Dallas, Texas.
- Charlie Chaplin wore a bowler hat to his morning dress as part of his 'Little Tramp' costume.
- Bing Crosby wears a bowler hat in the 1946 film Road to Utopia, among others.
- Oddjob, Auric Goldfinger's manservant, uses his razor-edged bowler hat as a weapon in the 1964 James Bond movie Goldfinger.
- John D. Rockerduck possesses the distinctive character trait of eating his bowler hat whenever he is defeated by Scrooge McDuck.
- J. Wellington Wimpy wears a bowler hat.
- Notable comic book characters who wear bowler hats include Timothy "Dum Dum" Dugan (Marvel Comics), Thomson and Thompson and Professor Calculus from The Adventures of Tintin series, and the Riddler (DC Comics).
- Doctor King Schultz and "Butch" Pooch wear wide Derby-variant bowler hats in Django Unchained.
- Matthew "Stymie" Beard from the Little Rascals was always seen with a bowler hat. It was a gift from Stan Laurel.
- Ub Iwerks character Horace Horsecollar is seen wearing an orange bowler hat complementing his outfit with an orange horse collar.
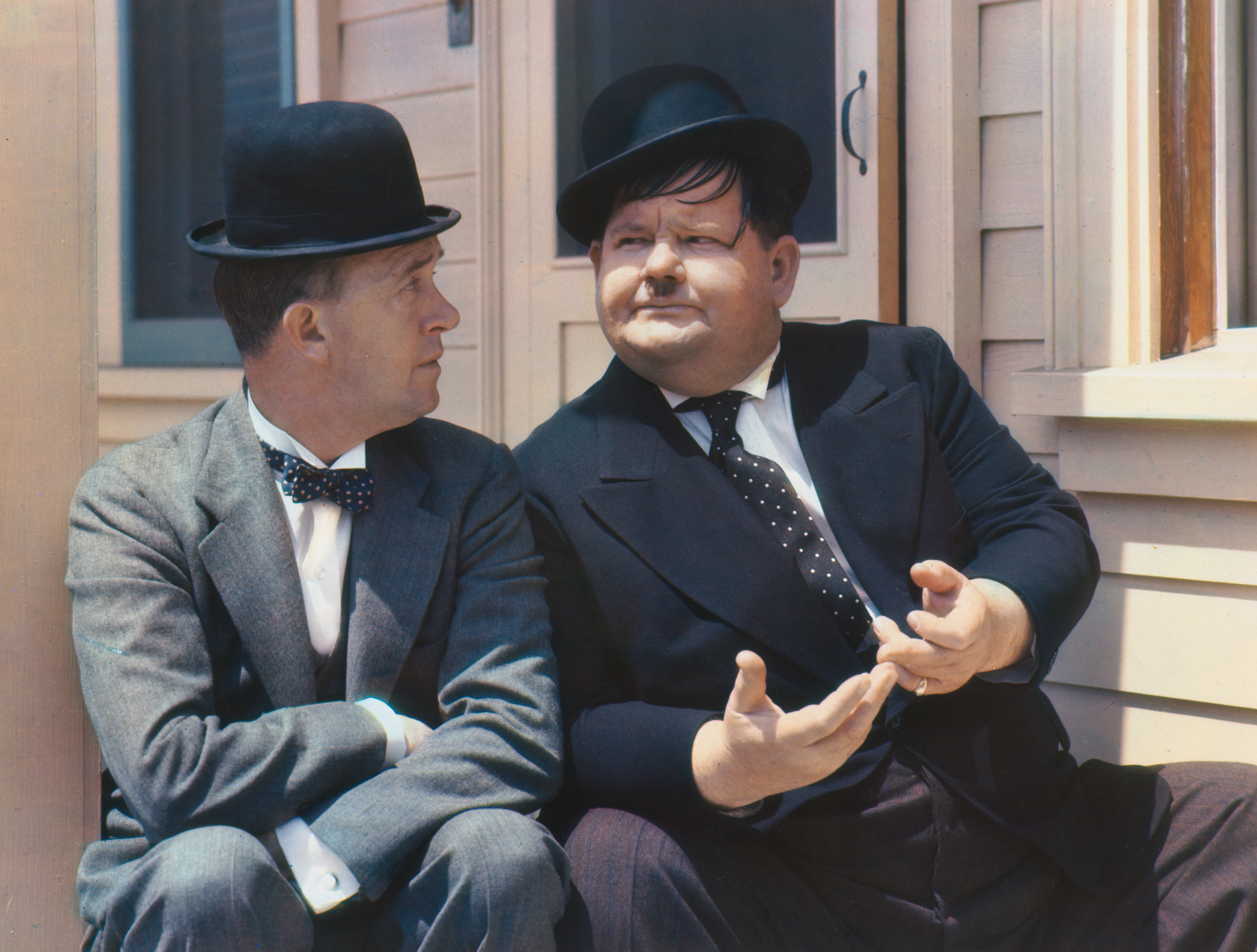
Laurel and Hardy, 1938.
Stan Laurel took his standard comic devices from the British music hall: the bowler hat, the deep comic gravity, and nonsensical understatement.

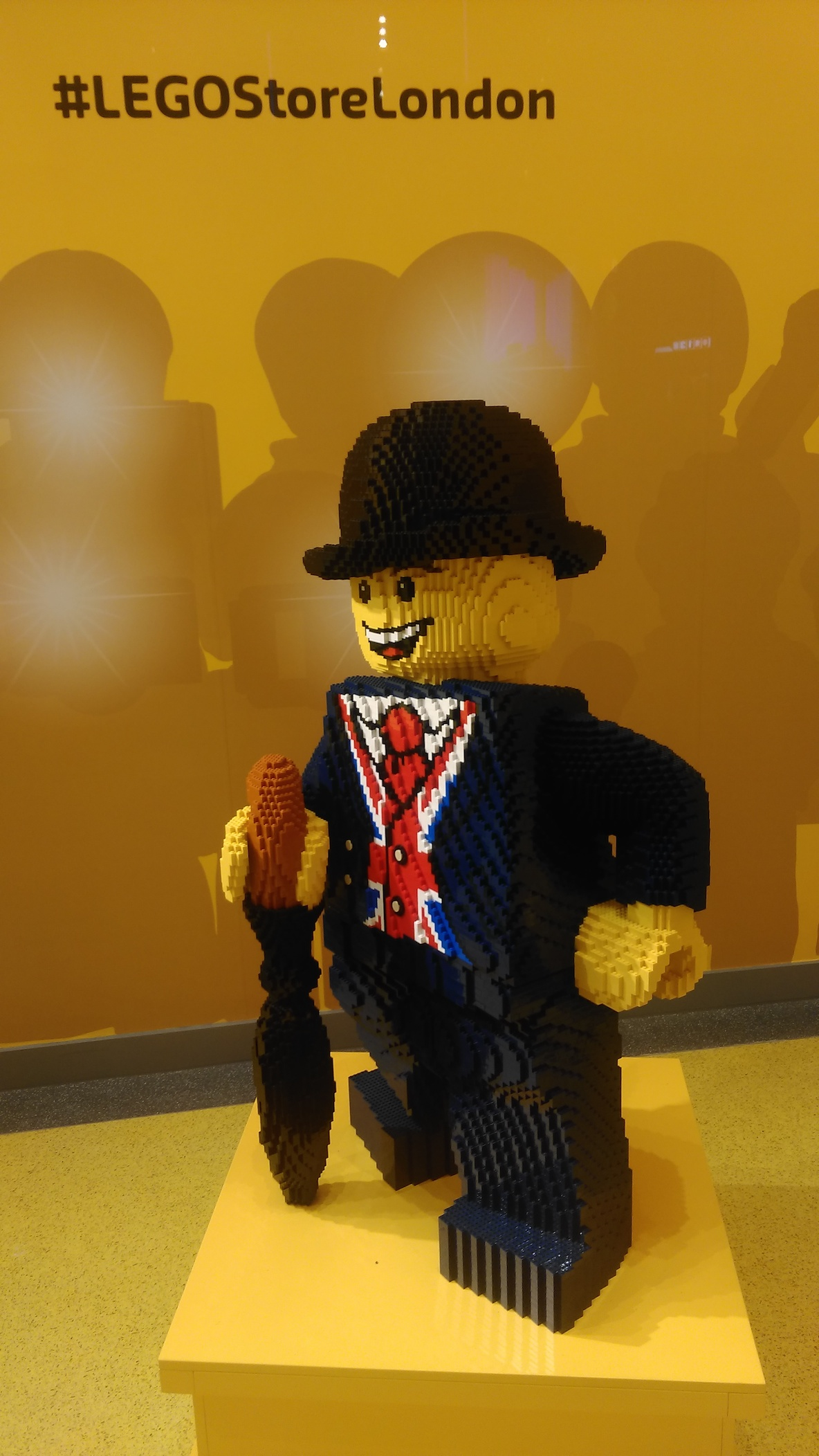
Lego of a classic London banker (with bowler and umbrella) at the Lego store in Leicester Square, London

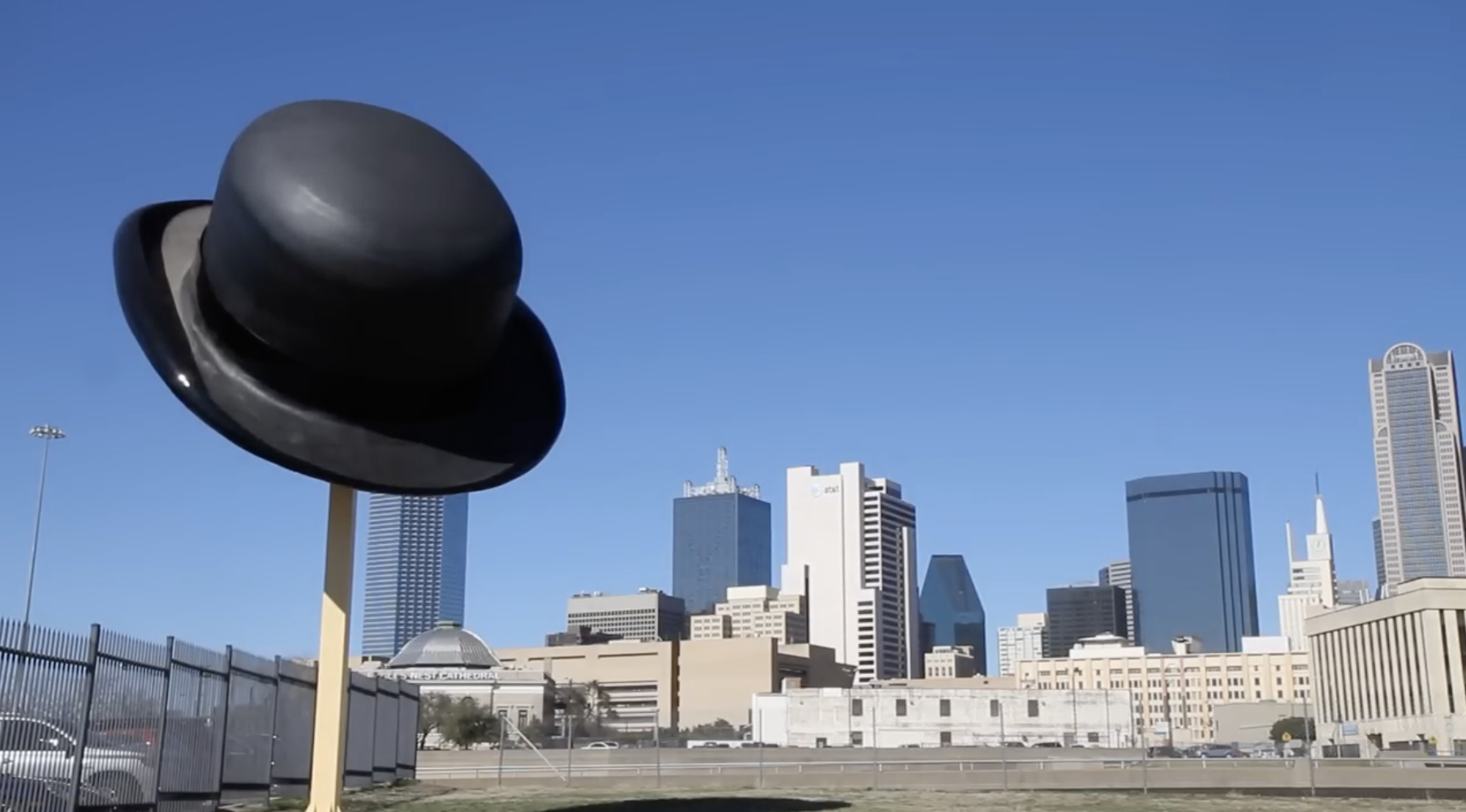
Giant bowler hat as roadside art in south Dallas, Texas

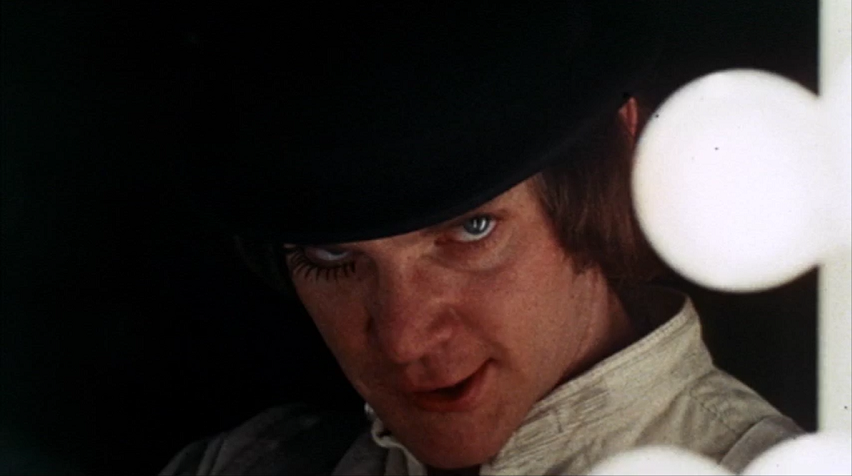
Alex DeLarge in the dystopian film A Clockwork Orange (1971)

== List of wearers ==
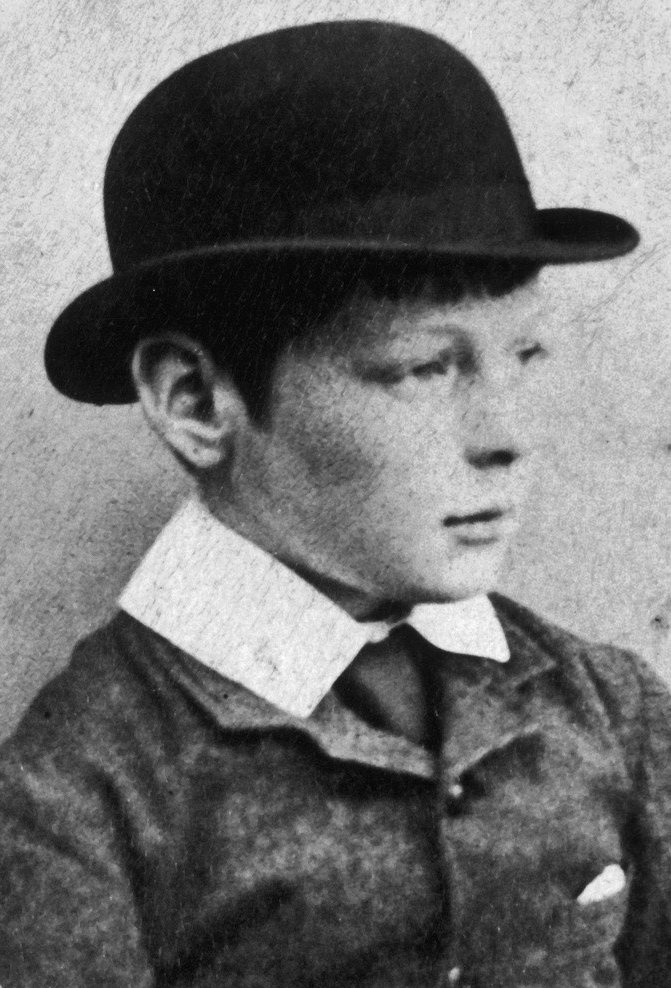
Winston Churchill in 1884

- Winston Churchill, Prime Minister during the Second World War.
- José Rizal, a Filipino patriot and national hero, wore a bowler hat before his execution by firing squad in 1896.
- The Plug Uglies, a nineteenth-century American street gang, wore bowler hats stuffed with cloth or wool to protect their heads while fighting.
- John Bonham, drummer for Led Zeppelin, often wore a bowler hat.
- Edward Coke, for whom the first bowler hat was designed.
- Lou Costello of Abbott and Costello often wore a bowler hat.
- Laurel and Hardy are known for wearing bowler hats.
- Curly Howard and Shemp Howard of The Three Stooges frequently wore bowler hats.
- Boy George often wore a bowler hat during the 1980s.
- Dr. Peacock, Dutch DJ, music producer, label owner, event organizer and businessman.
- Big Bully Busick, professional wrestler, who wore a bowler hat as part of his 1920s bully gimmick.
- Hipólito Yrigoyen, President of Argentina, frequently wore a bombín hat

== See also ==
- List of hat styles
