= Golconda (Magritte) =

1953 painting by René Magritte

- Golconde (French)
- Artist: René Magritte
- Year: 1953
- Medium: Oil on canvas
- Dimensions: 80 cm × 100 cm (31.5 in × 39.5 in)
- Location: The Menil Collection, Houston

Golconda (French: Golconde) is an oil painting on canvas by Belgian surrealist René Magritte, painted in 1953. It is housed at the Menil Collection in Houston, Texas.

== Description and analysis ==
The piece depicts a scene of red-roofed buildings and a mostly blue partly cloudy sky, with the air filled by dozens of nearly identical men dressed in dark overcoats and bowler hats, generally facing the viewer. The men are positioned as if standing, and may be falling, rising, or stationary in mid-air; no movement or motion is implied. They are equally spaced in a three-dimensional lattice, and receding back in rhombus grid layers.

Golconda was inspired by photographs of soldiers parachuting during World War I. In the painting, he reimagined the scene with identically dressed men in bowler hats. Magritte lived in a similar suburban environment, and dressed in a similar fashion. The bowler hat was a common feature of much of his work, and appears in paintings such as The Son of Man (1964).

Charly Herscovici, who was bequeathed copyright on the artist's works, commented on Golconda:

Magritte was fascinated by the seductiveness of images. Ordinarily, you see a picture of something and you believe in it, you are seduced by it; you take its honesty for granted. But Magritte knew that representations of things can lie. These images of men aren't men, just pictures of them, so they don't have to follow any rules. This painting is fun, but it also makes us aware of the falsity of representation.

One interpretation is that Magritte is demonstrating the line between individuality and group association, and how it is blurred. All of these men are dressed the same, have the same bodily features and are all floating/falling. This leaves one to look at the men as a group. Whereas if one looks at each person, one can predict that they may be completely different from another figure.

As was often the case with Magritte's works, the title Golconda was found by his poet friend Louis Scutenaire. Golconda is a ruined city in the state of Telangana, India, near Hyderabad, which from the mid-14th century until the end of the 17th was the capital of two successive kingdoms; the fame it acquired through being the center of the region's legendary diamond industry was such that its name remains, according to the Oxford English Dictionary, "a synonym for 'mine of wealth'."

Magritte included a likeness of Scutenaire in the painting – his face is used for the large man by the chimney of the house on the right of the picture.

== See also ==
- List of paintings by René Magritte
