= Not to Be Reproduced =

Painting by René Magritte

Not to Be Reproduced (La reproduction interdite)
- Artist: René Magritte
- Year: 1937
- Medium: Oil on canvas
- Dimensions: 81.3 cm × 65 cm (32.0 in × 26 in)
- Location: Museum Boijmans Van Beuningen, Rotterdam

Not to Be Reproduced (French: La reproduction interdite) is an oil on canvas painting by the Belgian surrealist artist René Magritte, from 1937. It is held by the Museum Boijmans Van Beuningen, in Rotterdam.

This painting was commissioned by poet and Magritte patron Edward James and is considered a portrait of James although James's face is not depicted. This painting was one of three produced by Magritte for the ballroom of James's London home. The other two were The Red Model (1937) and Time Transfixed (1938).

The work depicts a man standing in front of a mirror, but whereas the book on the mantelpiece is reflected correctly, the man's reflection also shows him from behind.

== Connections to other works ==
The book on the mantel is a well-worn copy of Edgar Allan Poe's 1838 novel The Narrative of Arthur Gordon Pym of Nantucket (written here in French as Les aventures d'Arthur Gordon Pym). Poe was one of Magritte's favorite authors and he made other references to the author in his work. For example, the title of the 1938 painting The Domain of Arnheim was taken from the 1847 Poe short story of the same name.

Magritte painted another portrait of Edward James titled The Pleasure Principle (1937). It depicts James from the front, sitting at a table, but his face is obscured by a bright light, such as that produced by a camera flash.

In 1977, Graham Hughes made a reference to the painting as the cover art for Roger Daltrey's third solo album One of the Boys.

In the 2003 novel Out Stealing Horses by Per Petterson the protagonist Trond makes a reference to the painting after a bad dream."I realised that what I was most afraid of in this world was to be the man in Magritte’s painting who looking at himself in the mirror sees only the back of his own head, again and again".

Loose recreations of the painting appeared in Bernardo Bertolucci's 1969 film The Spider's Stratagem, David Koepp's 2004 film Secret Window, in Richard Ayoade's 2013 film The Double, and Jordan Peele's 2019 film Us. A reproduction of the painting is a recurring object in Bernard Queysanne and Georges Perec's The Man Who Sleeps. It also appeared in the 2014 German movie Who Am I. The Japanese film Aru Otoko begins with an image of the painting and uses it to explore questions of identity.

Other references to the painting include a print of the painting helping to serve as a mood piece in John Kessel's short story Consolation in his 2022 anthology The Dark Ride.

== See also ==
- List of paintings by René Magritte
- 1937 in art
