= The Lovers (Magritte) =

Artwork

- Les Amants (French)
- Artist: René Magritte
- Year: 1928
- Medium: Oil on canvas
- Movement: Surrealism
- Dimensions: 54 cm × 73.4 cm (21 in × 28.9 in)
- Location: Museum of Modern Art, New York City
- Accession: 530.1998

The Lovers (French: Les Amants (French pronunciation: [lez‿amɑ̃])) is a surrealist painting by René Magritte, made in Paris in 1928. It is the first in a series of four variations, depicting two people kissing passionately with each of their faces covered in a white cloth. The barrier of fabric transforms an act of passion, such as a kiss, into an act of frustration, representing the lovers who cannot be together. Currently, it is located in the MoMA of New York City, as a part of Richard S. Zeisler's collection.

== Series ==
This work is part of a series of four similar paintings, all painted by Magritte in the same year. It consists of The Lovers II, which can be found in the National Gallery of Australia, The Lovers III and The Lovers IV. These paintings are characterized by sinister and mysterious landscapes and by couples with their faces covered by white cloth. The combination of these effects fits within Magritte's later analysis of his works from this period, given during a lecture in 1938. He said that his works from this time were "the result of a systematic search for an overwhelming poetic effect through the arrangement of objects borrowed from reality, which would give the real world from which those objects had been borrowed an overwhelming poetic meaning by a natural process of exchange"

== Interpretations ==
There have been several interpretations of this work, but many people have claimed that covering faces with cloth comes from a memory of Magritte. When he was 14, he witnessed the body of his mother being taken out of the Sambre river, with her wet nightgown wrapped around her face. Some have speculated that the trauma of his mother's suicide inspired a series of works in which he obscured his subjects’ faces, but there is no evidence of this being true.

Others have interpreted it as a depiction of the inability to fully know our intimate companions, as we cannot unveil them completely.

However, Magritte himself did not like the interpretations of his work, as he used to say he was not a painter but a man who communicated his thought by painting.

== Influences ==
The Lovers has been a very influential artwork throughout history. Fashion designer David Delfín has taken this artwork as inspiration for one of his most controversial collections, featuring models with their heads covered by hoods and slipknots around their necks. Spanish filmmaker Pedro Almodóvar also paid homage to Magritte's work in his films. In Broken Embraces, the protagonist, played by Penélope Cruz, kisses her husband under the bedsheets, creating a similar image to the painting. Additionally, Gerard Way of My Chemical Romance cites the painting as inspiration for the cover of their second album, Three Cheers for Sweet Revenge.
