= The Portrait (Magritte) =

Painting by René Magritte

- Artist: René Magritte
- Year: 1935
- Medium: Oil on canvas
- Dimensions: 73.3 cm × 50.2 cm (28⅞ in × 19⅞ in)
- Location: Museum of Modern Art; New York

The Portrait is an oil on canvas painting by the Belgian surrealist René Magritte, from 1935.

It depicts an almost photo-realistic table setting with a slice of ham in the center, with an eye staring back at the viewer from the center of the ham.

This painting was once part of the private collection of the surrealist painter Kay Sage. In 1956 she donated it as a gift to the Museum of Modern Art in New York City.

== In popular culture ==
The painting is the subject of SCP-099, an article from the SCP Foundation, where the original painting triggers acute paranoia in those who look at it too closely or for too long. Subjects affected by the painting report feeling as if inanimate objects are watching them.

== See also ==
- List of paintings by René Magritte
- 1935 in art
- SCP Foundation
