= Elective Affinities (painting) =

Painting by René Magritte

- Artist: René Magritte
- Year: 1933
- Medium: Oil on canvas
- Dimensions: 41 cm × 33 cm (16 in × 13 in)
- Location: Private collection

Elective Affinities (French: Les affinités électives) is a 1933 painting by the Belgian surrealist René Magritte. The title is taken from Johann Wolfgang von Goethe's 1809 novel Elective Affinities.

Magritte had the following to say about this work:

One night, I woke up in a room in which a cage with a bird sleeping in it had been placed. A magnificent error caused me to see an egg in the cage, instead of the vanished bird. I then grasped a new and astonishing poetic secret, for the shock which I experienced had been provoked precisely by the affinity of two objects—the cage and the egg—to each other, whereas previously this shock had been caused by my bringing together two objects that were unrelated.

== See also ==
- List of paintings by René Magritte
- 1933 in art
