= List of paintings by René Magritte =

René Magritte
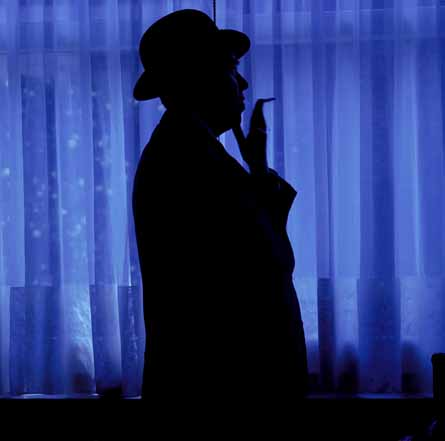
- Born: René François Ghislain Magritte; 21 November 1898; Lessines, Belgium
- Died: 15 August 1967 (aged 68); Brussels, Belgium
- Known for: Painter
- Notable work: The Treachery of Images; The Son of Man; The Human Condition; Golconda; The Menaced Assassin; The Lovers
- Movement: Surrealism

This is a list of the works of Belgian painter René Magritte (21 November 1898 – 15 August 1967), a key surrealist painter known for the wittiness of his work.

== Paintings ==
This list includes paintings attributed to Magritte.

=== 1898–1925: Early years ===
Image	Title	Year	Location	Medium	Dimensions (cm.)	Notes
	Nude	1919	Brachot Gallery, Brussels	Oil on canvas	40 × 29 cm	
	Landscape	1920		Oil on canvas	83 × 64 cm	
	Portrait of Pierre Bourgeois	1920		Oil on canvas		
	Bathers	1921		Oil on canvas	55 × 38 cm	
	Portrait of Pierre Broodcoorens	1921		Oil on canvas		
	L'Écuyère	1922		Oil on canvas	63 × 90 cm	Also known as The Station
	The Model	1922	Palais des Beaux-Arts de Charleroi, Charleroi	Oil on canvas	40 × 29 cm	Also known as Woman Bathing
	Donna	1923		Oil on canvas	46 × 38 cm	
	Georgette at the Piano	1923	Brachot Gallery, Brussels	Oil on canvas	44 × 36.5 cm	
	Modern	1923		Oil on canvas		
	Self-portrait	1923		Oil on canvas		
	Night Life	1923		Oil on canvas	50.1 × 40.2 cm	
	Three Nudes in an Interior	1923		Oil on canvas	59.5 × 55.5 cm	
	Youth	1924		Oil on canvas	50.5 × 41 cm	
	Advertisements for "Norine"	1925		Gouache on paper		Consists of 4 paintings
	The Bather	1925	Palais des Beaux-Arts de Charleroi, Charleroi	Oil on canvas	50 × 100 cm	
	Blue Cinema	1925	Private collection	Oil on canvas	65 × 54cm	
	Nocturne	1925		Oil on canvas	65 × 75 cm	
	Reclining Nude	1925		Oil on canvas		
	The Window	1925		Oil on canvas		
	Untitled	1925	Private collection	Collage	55 × 40 cm	

=== 1926–1930: Paris ===
Image	Title	Year	Location	Medium	Dimensions (cm.)	Comments
	Wreckage of the Dark	1926	Musée de Grenoble, Grenoble	Oil on canvas	120 × 80 cm	
	Popular Panorama	1926		Oil on canvas	120 × 80 cm	
	Silvered Chasm	1926		Oil on canvas	75 × 65 cm	
	Famous Man	1926		Oil on canvas	65 × 81 cm	
	The Difficult Crossing	1926	Private collection	Oil on canvas	80 cm × 65.3 cm	
	The Birth of the Idol	1926	Private collection	Oil on canvas		
	Sensational News	1926		Oil on canvas	62 × 81 cm	
	Desert Catapult	1926		Oil on canvas	75 × 65 cm	
	Rêve d'étudiant	1926	Nationalgalerie, Berlin	Oil and pencil on canvas	80.3 × 70 cm	
	Portrait of Paul Nougé	1927	Musées royaux des beaux-arts de Belgique, Brussels	Oil on canvas	95 × 65 cm	
	Forest	1927	Musée de l’art wallon, Liège	Oil on canvas	100 × 73 cm	
	Table, Ocean and Fruit	1927		Oil on canvas	50 × 65 cm	
	Taste for the Invisible	1927		Oil on canvas	100 × 73 cm	
	Double Secret	1927	Musée National d'Art Moderne, Paris	Oil on canvas	114 × 162 cm	Also known as Le double secret
	Meaning of Night	1927	Menil Collection, Houston	Oil on canvas	139 × 105 cm	
	The Murderous Sky	1927	Musée National d'Art Moderne, Paris	Oil on canvas	73 × 100 cm	Also known as Le ciel meurtrier
	Female Thief	1927	Musées royaux des beaux-arts de Belgique, Brussels	Oil on canvas	100 × 73 cm	
	Prince of Objects	1927		Oil on canvas with collaged canvas	50 × 65 cm	
	The Menaced Assassin	1927	Museum of Modern Art, New York City	Oil on canvas	150.4 × 195.2 cm	
	The Adulation of Space	1927-1928	Private collection	Oil on canvas	81 cm × 116 cm	
	Palace of Curtains	1928		Oil on canvas	81 × 116 cm	
	Voice of Silence	1928		Oil on canvas	54 × 73 cm	
	Acrobat's Ideas	1928	Staatsgalerie Moderner Kunst, Munich	Oil on canvas	116 × 81 cm	
	Swift Hope	1928	Hamburger Kunsthalle, Hamburg	Oil on canvas	49.5 × 64 cm	
	Flowers of the Abyss I	1928		Oil on canvas	54 × 73 cm	
	Flood	1928		Oil on canvas	73 × 54 cm	
	Acrobat's Rest	1928		Oil on canvas	54 × 73 cm	
	Apparition	1928	Galerie Brusberg	Oil on canvas	54 × 73 cm	
	Delights of Landscape	1928		Oil on canvas	54 × 73 cm	
	Lovers II	1928	National Gallery of Australia, Canberra	Oil on canvas	54 × 73 cm	
	Obsession	1928	Nationalgalerie, Berlin	Oil on canvas	81 × 116 cm	
	La Voix des airs	1928	Buffalo AKG Art Museum, Buffalo	Oil on canvas	83.82 × 68.58 × 7.62 cm	
	The Voice of Silence	1928	Worcester Art Museum, Worcester	Oil on canvas	54 × 73 cm	Also known as La voix du silence
	Flowers of the Abyss II	1928		Oil on canvas	41 × 27 cm	
	Magic Light	1928		Oil on canvas	54 × 73 cm	
	Six Elements	1928	Philadelphia Museum of Art, Philadelphia	Oil on canvas	73 × 100 cm	
	Attempting the Impossible	1928		Oil on canvas	116 × 81 cm	
	Lost World	1928	Kunstmuseum Winterthur, Winterthur	Oil on canvas	54.5 × 73.5 cm	
	Apparition	1928	Staatsgalerie Stuttgart, Stuttgart	Oil on canvas	82.5 × 116 cm	
	Palace of Curtains III	1928-29	Museum of Modern Art, New York	Oil on canvas	81.2 × 116.4 cm	
	Portrait of Paul-Gustave van Hecke	1928		Oil on canvas	65 × 50 cm	
	The Lovers	1928	Museum of Modern Art, New York	Oil on canvas	54 × 73.4 cm	
	The False Mirror	1928	Museum of Modern Art, New York	Oil on canvas	54 × 80.9 cm	
	The Empty Mask	1928	National Museum Cardiff, Cardiff	Oil on canvas	81.2 cm × 116.2 cm	
	La Naissance des Fleurs	1929	Deji Art Museum, Nanjing	Oil on canvas		
	Literal Meaning II	1929	Menil Collection, Houston	Oil on canvas	73 × 54 cm.	
	Literal Meaning IV	1929		Oil on canvas	73 × 54 cm	
	Literal Meaning VI	1929		Oil on canvas	54 × 73 cm	
	The Treachery of Images	1929		Oil on canvas	55 × 72 cm	Also known as This is not a Pipe
	Tree of Knowledge	1929		Oil on canvas	41 × 27 cm	
	The Eternally Obvious	1930	Menil Collection, Houston	Oil on five separately stretched and framed canvases mounted on acrylic sheet	167.6 × 38.1 × 55.9 cm	Also known as L'évidence éternelle
	La clef des songes	1930	Private collection (Vienna)	Oil on canvas	81 × 60 cm	
	Depths of the Earth	1930		Oil on canvas: four canvases framed and mounted on glass	12 × 22 cm; 16 × 22 cm; 22 × 16 cm; 19 × 24 cm	
	Portrait of E.L.T. Mesens	1930		Oil on canvas	73 × 54 cm	

=== 1931–1942: Brussels ===
Image	Title	Year	Location	Medium	Dimensions (cm.)	Comments
	Elective Affinities	1933	Private collection	Oil on canvas	21 × 33 cm	
	The Human Condition	1933	National Gallery of Art, Washington DC	Oil on canvas	100 cm × 81 cm	
	The Portrait	1935	Museum of Modern Art, New York	Oil on canvas	53.3 × 50.2 cm	
	On the Threshold of Liberty	1937	Art Institute of Chicago, Chicago	Oil on canvas	238.8 cm × 185.4 cm	
	Not to be Reproduced	1938	Museum Boijmans Van Beuningen, Rotterdam	Oil on canvas	81 cm × 65 cm	
	Time Transfixed	1938	Art Institute of Chicago, Chicago	Oil on canvas	147 cm × 99 cm	
	The Palace of Memories	1939	Private collection	Oil on canvas	46 cm × 38 cm	
	The Key of the Fields	1936	Museo Nacional Thyssen-Bornemisza, Madrid	Oil on canvas	80 × 60 cm	Also known as La Clef des champs

=== 1943–1947: Sunlit period ===
Image	Title	Year	Location	Medium	Dimensions (cm.)	Comments
	The Rape	1945	Musée National d'Art Moderne, Paris	Oil on canvas	65.3 × 50.4 cm	Also known as Le viol
	Olympia	1947 or 48	René Magritte Museum, Jette	Oli on Canvas	60 x 80 cm.	Stolen in 2009, recovered in 2012

=== 1947–1948: Vache period ===
Image	Title	Year	Location	Medium	Dimensions (cm.)	Comments
	Ellipse	1948	Musées royaux des beaux-arts de Belgique, Brussels	Oil on canvas		
	The Empire of Light	1948	Private collection, Brussels	Oil on canvas	100 x 80 cm	Succession of 17 oil paintings

=== 1949–1960: Mature period ===
Image	Title	Year	Location	Medium	Dimensions (cm.)	Comments
	The Empire of Light II	1950	Museum of Modern Art, New York City	Oil on canvas	79 x 99 cm	
	The Seducer	1950	Virginia Museum of Fine Arts, Richmond	Oil on canvas	38 cm × 46 cm	
	The Listening Room	1952	Menil Collection, Houston	Oil on canvas	45 cm × 55 cm	
	Golconda	1953	Menil Collection, Houston	Oil on canvas	80 cm × 100 cm	
	The Good Example	1953	Museum of Grenoble, Grenoble	Oil on canvas	46.5 x 35.5 cm	
	The Empire of Light	1954	Peggy Guggenheim Collection, Venice	Oil on canvas	195 x 131 cm	
	The Mysteries of the Horizon	1955	Private collection	Oil on canvas	50 cm × 65 cm	
	16th September	1956	Royal Museum of Fine Arts Antwerp, Antwerp	Oil on canvas	115 cm × 88 cm	
	The Alarm Clock	1957	Private collection	Oil on canvas	62.5 cm × 52 cm	
	The Castle of the Pyrenees	1959	Israel Museum, Jerusalem	Oil on canvas	200 cm × 145 cm	

=== 1961–1967: Later years ===
Image	Title	Year	Location	Medium	Dimensions (cm.)	Comments
	High Society	1962		Oil on canvas		
	The Difficult Crossing	1963	Private collection	Oil on canvas		
	The Telescope	1963	Menil Collection, Houston	Oil on canvas	176 cm × 115 cm	
	The Son of Man	1964	Private collection	Oil on canvas	116 cm × 89 cm	
