= The Human Condition (Magritte) =

Painting series by Rene Magritte

- Artist: René Magritte
- Year: 1933
- Medium: Oil on canvas
- Dimensions: 100 cm × 81 cm (39 in × 32 in)
- Location: National Gallery of Art, Washington DC

The Human Condition
- Artist: René Magritte
- Year: 1935
- Medium: Oil on canvas
- Dimensions: 100 cm × 81 cm (39 in × 32 in)
- Location: Simon Spierer Collection, Geneva

The Human Condition
- Artist: René Magritte
- Year: 1935
- Medium: Oil on canvas
- Dimensions: 73.2 cm × 54.2 cm (28.8 in × 21.3 in)
- Location: Norwich Castle Museum, Norwich

The Human Condition
- Artist: René Magritte
- Year: 1945
- Medium: Watercolor, crayon over graphite, ink and gouache
- Dimensions: 42.2 cm × 32.2 cm (16.6 in × 12.7 in)
- Location: Cleveland Museum of Art, Cleveland

The Human Condition (La condition humaine) is the title of four paintings by the Belgian surrealist René Magritte. One was completed in 1933 and is in the collection of the National Gallery of Art in Washington, D.C. Another one was completed in 1935 and is part of the Simon Spierer Collection in Geneva, Switzerland. A drawing with the same name is kept at the Cleveland Museum of Art and another picture is part of the Norfolk Museum Collections.

== Relation to other paintings ==
One of Magritte's most common artistic devices was the use of objects to hide what lies behind them. For example, in The Son of Man (1964) an apple hides the face of a man wearing a bowler hat, and in The Pleasure Principle (1937) a bright flash likewise obscures a face. In The Human Condition, the cover-up appears in the form of a painting within a painting.

Magritte had this to say of his 1933 work:

In front of a window seen from inside a room, I placed a painting representing exactly that portion of the landscape covered by the painting. Thus, the tree in the picture hid the tree behind it, outside the room. For the spectator, it was both inside the room within the painting and outside in the real landscape.

Magritte continues his explanation in a letter to the Belgian poet Achille Chavée.

Which is how we see the world, namely, outside of us; although having only one representation of it within us. Similarly we sometimes remember a past event as being in the present. Time and space lose meaning and our daily experience becomes paramount. This is how we see the world. We see it outside ourselves, and at the same time we only have a representation of it in ourselves. In the same way, we sometimes situate in the past that which is happening in the present. Time and space thus loose the vulgar meaning that only daily experience takes into account. Questions such as 'What does this picture mean, what does it represent?' are possible only if one is incapable of seeing a picture in all its truth, only if one automatically understands that a very precise image does not show precisely what it is. It's like believing that the implied meaning is worth more than the overt meaning. There is no implied meaning in my paintings, despite the confusion that attributes symbolic meaning to my painting. How can anyone enjoy interpreting symbols? They are 'substitutes' that are only useful to a mind that is incapable of knowing the things themselves. A devotee of interpretation cannot see a bird; he only sees it as a symbol. Although this manner of knowing the 'world' may be useful in treating mental illness, it would be silly to confuse it with a mind that can be applied to any kind of thinking at all.

Paintings within paintings appear frequently in Magritte works. Euclidean Walks (1955) is a work perhaps most like The Human Condition. It places a canvas in front of a high window depicting the tower of a close building and a street below. In The Fair Captive (1947), there is a beach scene with an easel set up. As in the previous cases it holds a canvas depicting what the viewer might expect to be behind it. This time though, flames from a burning tuba in front of the frame are seen "reflected." The Call of the Peaks (1942) shows a mountain canvas in front of a mountain background which is buffeted on the right by a curtain.

The list of similar works can easily be extended to include such paintings as The Key to the Fields (1936), its 1964 reincarnation Evening Falls and the 1942 work The Domain of Arnheim, all of which feature broken windows whose shattered glass pieces on the floor still show the outside world they used to conceal.

Another series of pieces which show both strong similarities to and strong differences from The Human Condition are the works titled The Alarm Clock. In these works, a painting is placed on an easel in front of a window or on a balcony with a simple landscape in the background. However, the painting does not show what may possibly be behind, but is instead an upside-down basic fruit still life.

=== Analysis ===
At first, one automatically assumes that the painting on the easel depicts the portion of the landscape outside the window that it hides from view. After a moment's consideration, however, one realizes that this assumption is based upon a false premise: that is, that the imagery of Magritte's painting is real, while the painting on the easel is a representation of that reality. In fact, there is no difference between them. Both are part of the same painting, the same artistic fabrication. It is perhaps to this repeating cycle, in which the viewer, even against his will, sees the one as real and the other as representation, that Magritte's title makes reference.

== See also ==
- List of paintings by René Magritte
