= The Son of Man =

Painting by René Magritte

- Artist: René Magritte
- Year: 1964
- Medium: Oil on canvas
- Dimensions: 116 cm × 89 cm (45.67 in × 35 in)
- Location: Private collection/Not Public

The Son of Man (French: Le fils de l'homme) is a 1964 painting by the Belgian surrealist painter René Magritte. It is perhaps his best-known artwork.

Magritte painted it as a self-portrait. The painting consists of a man in an overcoat and a bowler hat standing in front of a low wall, beyond which are the sea and a cloudy sky. The man's face is largely obscured by a hovering green apple. However, the man's eyes can be seen peeking over the edge of the apple. Another subtle feature is that the man's left arm appears to bend backwards at the elbow.

About the painting, Magritte said:

At least it hides the face partly well, so you have the apparent face, the apple, hiding the visible but hidden, the face of the person. It's something that happens constantly. Everything we see hides another thing, we always want to see what is hidden by what we see. There is an interest in that which is hidden and which the visible does not show us. This interest can take the form of a quite intense feeling, a sort of conflict, one might say, between the visible that is hidden and the visible that is present.

== Similar paintings ==
The Son of Man closely resembles two other Magritte paintings. The Great War (La grande guerre, 1964) is a variation on The Son of Man which pictures only the figure from the torso up. A Taste of the Invisible (Le Gout de l'invisible) is a gouache painting of the same subject.

Another painting from the same year, called The Great War on Facades (La Grande Guerre Façades, 1964), features a person standing in front of a wall overlooking the sea (as in The Son of Man), but it is a woman, holding an umbrella, her face covered by flowers. There is also Man in the Bowler Hat, a similar painting wherein a man's face is obscured by a bird rather than an apple.

== Provenance and display ==
Magritte sold the painting to Harry Torczyner in August 1964. In 1998, Christie's auctioned it to a private collector for $5,392,500. Both Torczyner and the current owner have occasionally lent the work to museums. It was most recently exhibited at SFMOMA in 2018.

== In popular culture ==
In 1970, Norman Rockwell created the 33-by-44-centimetre (13 by 17.5 in) oil painting Mr. Apple as a playful homage to The Son of Man. However, in it, a man's head is replaced—rather than hidden—by an apple (and is red, not green).

The painting plays an important role in the 1999 version of The Thomas Crown Affair. It appears several times, first when Crown and Catherine Banning are walking through the museum and she jokingly calls it his portrait, and particularly in the final robbery scenes when numerous men wearing bowler hats and trench coats carry briefcases throughout the museum to cover Crown's movements and confuse the security team.

In the video game Superliminal, the achievement titled "Son of Man" is gained by dropping an apple on one's own head.

The green apple was an ongoing motif in Magritte's work. His use of it in the 1966 painting Le Jeu De Morre, owned by Paul McCartney, inspired the Beatles to name their record company Apple Corps.

== See also ==
- List of paintings by René Magritte
