= René Magritte =

Belgian painter (1898–1967)

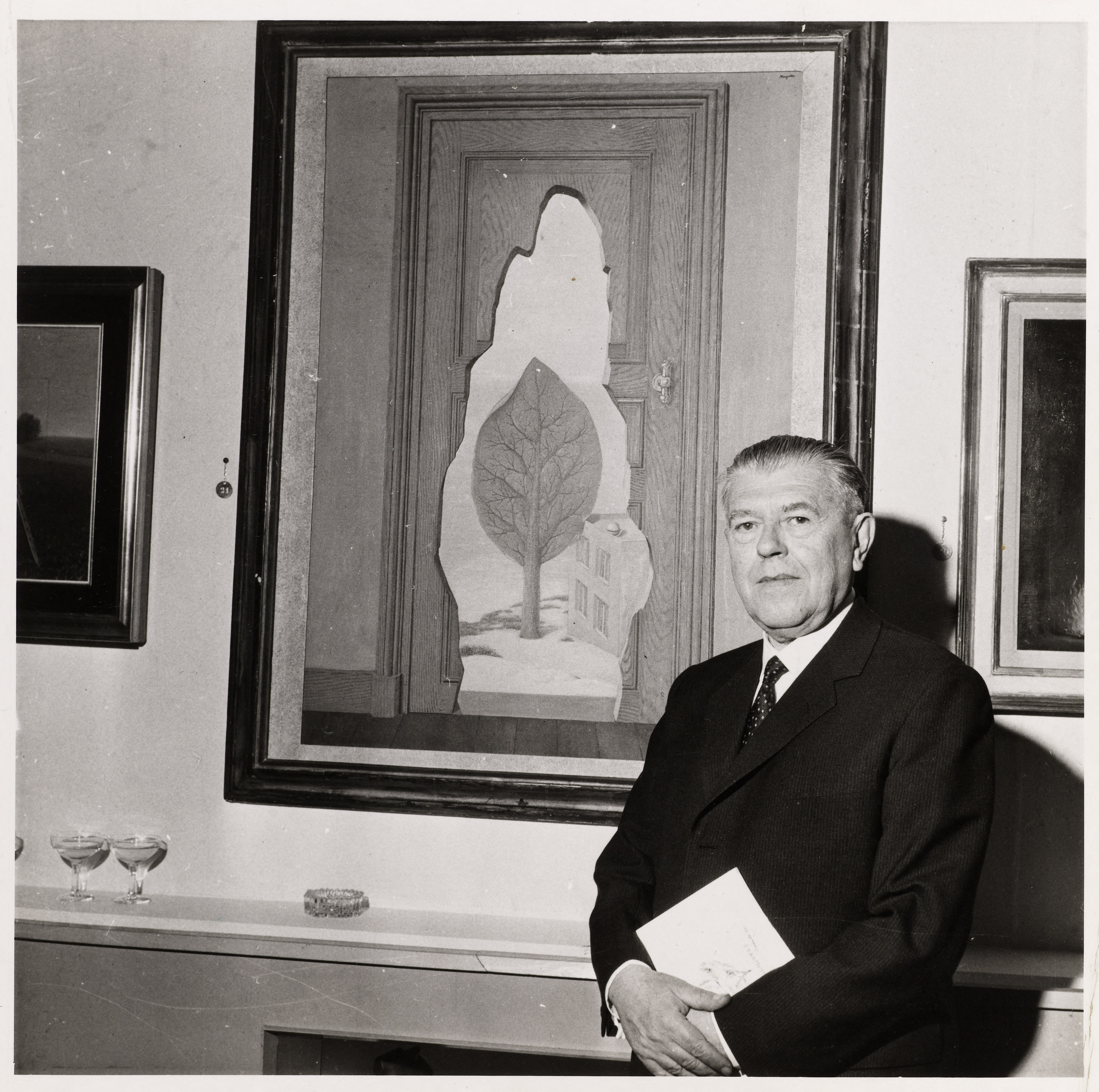
- Portrait of Magritte in front of his painting La perspective amoureuse, 1961
- Born: René François Ghislain Magritte; 21 November 1898; Lessines, Belgium
- Died: 15 August 1967 (aged 68); Brussels, Belgium
- Known for: Painter
- Notable work: The Treachery of Images; The Son of Man; The Human Condition; Golconda; The Menaced Assassin; The Lovers
- Movement: Surrealism

René François Ghislain Magritte (French: [ʁəne fʁɑ̃swa ɡilɛ̃ maɡʁit]; 21 November 1898 – 15 August 1967) was a Belgian surrealist artist known for his depictions of familiar objects in unfamiliar, unexpected contexts, which often provoked questions about the nature and boundaries of reality and representation. His imagery has influenced pop art, minimalist art, and conceptual art.

== Early life ==
René Magritte was born in Lessines, in the province of Hainaut in Belgium, in 1898. He was the oldest son of Léopold Magritte, a tailor and textile merchant, and Régina (née Bertinchamps), who was a milliner before she got married. Little is known about Magritte's early life. He began lessons in drawing in 1910.

On 24 February 1912, his mother drowned herself in the River Sambre at Châtelet. It was not her first suicide attempt. Her body was not discovered until 12 March, 16 days later. It was suggested that 13-year-old Magritte was present when her body was retrieved from the water, but later research discredited this story, which may have originated with the family nurse. Supposedly, when his mother was found, her dress was covering her face, an image that has been suggested as the source of several of Magritte's paintings in 1927–28 of people with cloth obscuring their faces, including Les Amants.

== Career ==
Magritte's earliest paintings, which date to about 1915, were Impressionistic. In 1916–18, he studied at the Académie Royale des Beaux-Arts in Brussels, under Constant Montald, but found the instruction uninspiring. He also took classes at the Académie Royale from the painter and poster designer Gisbert Combaz. The paintings he produced between 1918 and 1924 were influenced by Futurism and the figurative Cubism of Metzinger.

From December 1920 to September 1921, Magritte served in the Belgian infantry in the Flemish town of Beverlo near Leopoldsburg. In 1922, he married Georgette Berger, whom he had met as a child in 1913. Also in 1922, the poet Marcel Lecomte showed Magritte a reproduction of Giorgio de Chirico's The Song of Love (painted in 1914). The work brought Magritte to tears; he described this as "one of the most moving moments of my life: my eyes saw thought for the first time". The paintings of the Belgian symbolist painter William Degouve de Nuncques have also been noted as an influence on Magritte, specifically The Blind House (1892) and Magritte's variations or series on The Empire of Lights.

In 1922–23, Magritte worked as a draughtsman in a wallpaper factory, and he was a poster and advertisement designer until 1926, when a contract with Galerie Le Centaure in Brussels made it possible for him to paint full-time. In 1926, Magritte produced his first surreal painting, The Lost Jockey (Le jockey perdu).

The Menaced Assassin, 1927, Museum of Modern Art

The Lovers, 1928, Museum of Modern Art

In 1927 Magritte held his first solo exhibition, in Brussels. It had poor reviews; depressed by the failure, he moved to Paris, where he became friends with André Breton and became involved in the Surrealist group. An illusionistic, dream-like quality is characteristic of Magritte's version of Surrealism. He became a leading member of the movement and remained in Paris for three years. In 1929, he was put under contract at Goemans Gallery in Paris along with Jean Arp and Yves Tanguy.

On 15 December 1929, Magritte participated in the last publication, No. 12, of La Révolution surréaliste, with his essay "Les mots et les images", where words play with images in sync with his work The Treachery of Images.

Galerie Le Centaure closed at the end of 1929, ending Magritte's contract income. Having made little impact in Paris, Magritte returned to Brussels in 1930 and resumed working in advertising. He and his brother, Paul, formed an agency, which earned him a living wage. In 1932, Magritte joined the Communist Party, which he periodically left and rejoined for several years. Between 1930 and 1932, Magritte had no exhibitions and sold no work. During this period, he was financially supported by a monthly stipend arranged by Belgian playwright Claude Spaak, the husband of Suzanne Spaak. In 1934, Suzanne Spaak's sister, Alice Lorge, purchased Magritte's La Magie Noire. This was the first of a series of 11 paintings that depicted Magritte's wife, Georgette Berger, in a classical nude pose. Claude Spaak also commissioned portraits of his wife and children from Magritte.

In 1936, Magritte had his first solo exhibition in the United States, at the Julien Levy Gallery in New York, followed by an exposition at the London Gallery in 1938.

Between 1934 and 1937, Magritte drew film posters under the pseudonym 'Emair' for the German sound film distributor Tobis Klangfilm. The Leuven City Archive preserves seven posters designed by Magritte.

During the early stages of his career, the British surrealist patron Edward James allowed Magritte to stay rent-free in his London home, where Magritte studied architecture and painted. James is depicted in two of Magritte's 1937 paintings, Le Principe du Plaisir (The Pleasure Principle) and La Reproduction Interdite, also known as Not to Be Reproduced.

During the German occupation of Belgium during World War II, Magritte remained in Brussels, which led to a break with Breton. He briefly adopted a colorful, painterly style in 1943–44, an interlude known as his "Renoir period", as a reaction to his feelings of alienation and abandonment living under German occupation.

In 1946, renouncing the violence and pessimism of his earlier work, he joined several other Belgian artists in signing the manifesto Surrealism in Full Sunlight. During 1947–48, Magritte's "Vache period", he painted in a provocative and crude Fauve style. During this time, he supported himself by producing fake Picassos, Braques, and de Chiricos—a fraudulent repertoire he later expanded into the printing of forged banknotes during the lean postwar period. (Ironically, Belgium issued a 500-franc banknote celebrating Magritte on his centenary.) This venture was undertaken alongside his brother Paul and fellow Surrealist and "surrogate son" Marcel Mariën, to whom had fallen the task of selling the forgeries. At the end of 1948, Magritte returned to the style and themes of his pre-war surrealistic art.

In France, Magritte's work has been showcased in a number of retrospective exhibitions, including at the Centre Georges Pompidou in 2016 and 2017. In the U.S., his work has been displayed in three retrospective exhibitions: at the Museum of Modern Art in 1965, the Metropolitan Museum of Art in 1992, and the Metropolitan Museum of Art again in 2013. The 2018 exhibition, "The Fifth Season" at the San Francisco Museum of Modern Art, focused on the work of his later years.

Politically, Magritte stood to the left, and retained close ties to the Communist Party, even in the postwar years. But he was critical of the functionalist cultural policy of the Communist left, saying, "Class consciousness is as necessary as bread; but that does not mean that workers must be condemned to bread and water and that wanting chicken and champagne would be harmful. [...] For the Communist painter, the justification of artistic activity is to create pictures that can represent mental luxury." While remaining committed to the political left, he thus advocated a certain autonomy of art. Magritte was an agnostic in religious belief.

Popular interest in Magritte's work rose considerably in the 1960s, and his imagery has influenced pop, minimalist, and conceptual art. In 2005, he was ranked ninth in the Walloon popular vote on Les plus grands Belges ("The greatest Belgians"); in the Flemish version, De Grootste Belg, he was 18th.

== Personal life ==
In June 1922, Magritte married Georgette Berger, the daughter of a butcher in Charleroi. They had first met when she was 13 and he was 15; they met again in Brussels in 1920 and Georgette, who had also studied art, became Magritte's model, muse, and wife.

In 1936, Magritte's marriage became troubled when he met a young performance artist, Sheila Legge, and began an affair with her. Magritte arranged for his friend Paul Colinet to entertain and distract Georgette, but this led to an affair between Georgette and Colinet. Magritte and his wife did not reconcile until 1940.

Magritte died of pancreatic cancer on 15 August 1967, aged 68, and was interred in Schaerbeek Cemetery, Evere, Brussels.

== Philosophical and artistic gestures ==
The Empire of Light, c. 1950–1954, Museum of Modern Art

It is a union that suggests the essential mystery of the world. Art for me is not an end in itself, but a means of evoking that mystery.

— René Magritte on putting seemingly unrelated objects together in juxtaposition

Magritte's work frequently displays a collection of ordinary objects in an unusual context, giving new meanings to familiar things. The use of objects as other than what they seem typifies his work. For example, The Treachery of Images (La trahison des images) shows a pipe that looks as though it is a model for a tobacco store advertisement. Magritte painted below the pipe "Ceci n'est pas une pipe" ("This is not a pipe"), which seems a contradiction but is actually true: the painting is not a pipe, it is an image of a pipe. It does not "satisfy emotionally"; asked about this image, Magritte said that of course it was not a pipe—just try to fill it with tobacco.

Ceci n'est pas une pipe
A man saying the phrase Ceci n'est pas une pipe

Magritte's work has been described by Suzi Gablik as "a systematic attempt to disrupt any dogmatic view of the physical world". Therefore, when Magritte painted rocks—which are commonly understood to be heavy, inanimate objects—he often painted them floating cloud-like in the sky, or painted scenes of people and their environment turned to stone.

Among Magritte's works are a number of surrealist versions of other famous paintings, such as Perspective I and Perspective II, which are copies of David's Portrait of Madame Récamier and Manet's The Balcony, respectively, with the human subjects replaced by coffins. Elsewhere, Magritte challenges the difficulty of artwork to convey meaning with a recurring motif of an easel, as in his The Human Condition series (1933, 1935) or The Promenades of Euclid (1955), wherein the spires of a castle are "painted" upon the ordinary streets the canvas overlooks. In a letter to Breton, he wrote of The Human Condition that it was irrelevant if the scene behind the easel differed from what was depicted upon it, "but the main thing was to eliminate the difference between a view seen from outside and from inside a room". The windows in some of these pictures are framed with heavy drapes, suggesting a theatrical motif.

Magritte's style of surrealism is more representational than the "automatic" style of artists such as Joan Miró. His use of ordinary objects in unfamiliar spaces is joined to his desire to create poetic imagery. He called painting "the art of putting colors side by side in such a way that their real aspect is effaced, so that familiar objects—the sky, people, trees, mountains, furniture, the stars, solid structures, graffiti—become united in a single poetically disciplined image. The poetry of this image dispenses with any symbolic significance, old or new."

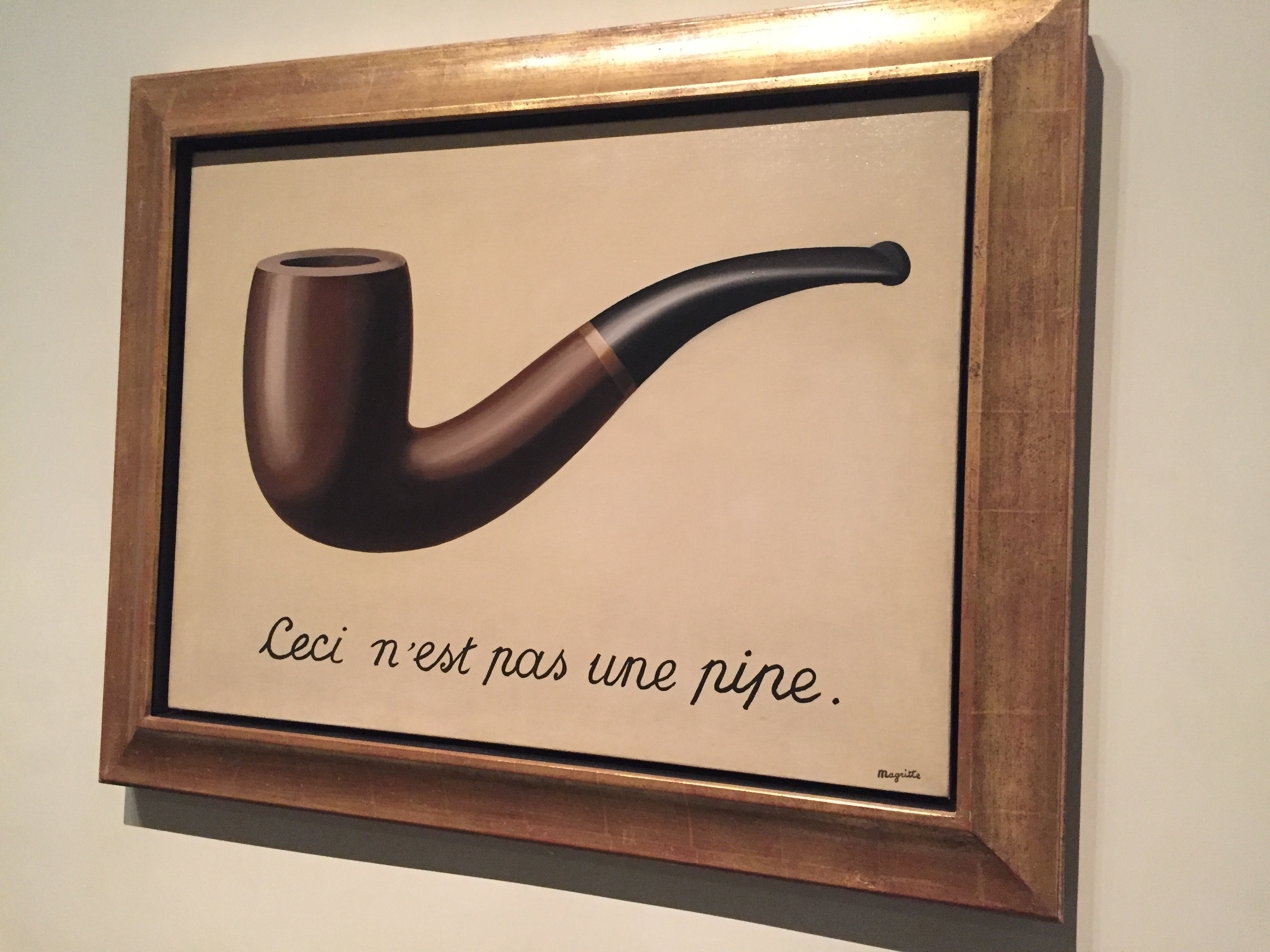
The Treachery of Images (This Is Not A Pipe/Ceci n'est pas une pipe), 1929, by René Magritte

Magritte described his paintings as "visible images which conceal nothing; they evoke mystery and, indeed, when one sees one of my pictures, one asks oneself this simple question, 'What does that mean?'. It does not mean anything, because mystery means nothing either, it is unknowable."

Magritte's constant play with reality and illusion has been attributed to the early death of his mother. Psychoanalysts who have examined bereaved children have hypothesized that Magritte's back-and-forth play with reality and illusion reflects his "constant shifting back and forth from what he wishes—'mother is alive'—to what he knows—'mother is dead'".

In 2019 Patricia Allmer demonstrated the influence of fairground attractions on Magritte's art, from carousels and circuses to panoramas and stage magic.

== Artists influenced by Magritte ==
Contemporary artists have been greatly influenced by Magritte's examination of the fickleness of images. Artists influenced by Magritte include John Baldessari, Ed Ruscha, Andy Warhol, Jasper Johns, Jan Verdoodt, Martin Kippenberger, Duane Michals, Storm Thorgerson, and Luis Rey. Some of their works integrate direct references and others offer contemporary viewpoints on his abstract fixations.

Magritte's use of simple graphic and everyday imagery has been compared to that of pop artists. His influence in the development of pop art has been widely recognized, although Magritte himself discounted the connection. He considered the pop artists' representation of "the world as it is" as "their error", and contrasted their attention to the transitory with his concern for "the feeling for the real, insofar as it is permanent." The 2006–07 LACMA exhibition "Magritte and Contemporary Art: The Treachery of Images" examined the relationship between Magritte and contemporary art.

== Legacy ==
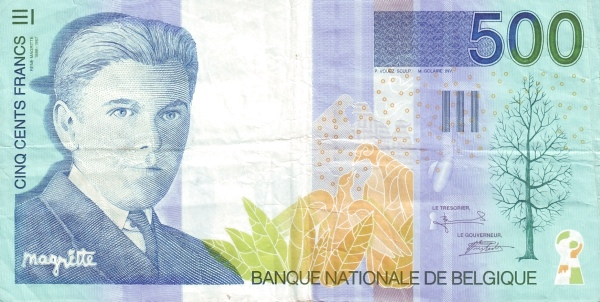
500 franc note showing portrait of Magritte

The 1960s brought a great increase in public awareness of Magritte's work. Thanks to his "sound knowledge of how to present objects in a manner both suggestive and questioning", his works have been frequently adapted or plagiarized in advertisements, posters, book covers and the like. Examples include album covers such as Beck-Ola by The Jeff Beck Group, reproducing Magritte's The Listening Room; Alan Hull's 1973 album Pipedream, which uses The Philosopher's Lamp; Jackson Browne's 1974 album Late for the Sky, with artwork inspired by The Empire of Light; Oregon's album Oregon referring to Carte Blanche; the Firesign Theatre's album Just Folks... A Firesign Chat based on The Mysteries of the Horizon; and Styx's album The Grand Illusion incorporating an adaptation of the painting The Blank Signature (Le Blanc Seing). The Nigerian rapper Jesse Jagz's 2014 album Jagz Nation Vol. 2: Royal Niger Company has cover art inspired by Magritte. In 2015 the band Punch Brothers used The Lovers as the cover of its album The Phosphorescent Blues.

The 1968 logo of Apple Corps, The Beatles' company, is inspired by Magritte's Le Jeu de Mourre, a 1966 painting. Paul Simon's song "Rene and Georgette Magritte with Their Dog after the War", inspired by a photograph of Magritte by Lothar Wolleh, appears on the 1983 album Hearts and Bones. John Cale's song "Magritte" appears on the 2003 album HoboSapiens. Tom Stoppard wrote a 1970 Surrealist play called After Magritte. John Berger scripted the book Ways of Seeing using images and ideologies regarding Magritte. Douglas Hofstadter's 1979 book Gödel, Escher, Bach uses Magritte works for many of its illustrations. The Treachery of Images was used in a major plot in L. J. Smith's 1994 novel The Forbidden Game. Magritte's imagery has inspired filmmakers ranging from the surrealist Marcel Mariën to mainstream directors such as Jean-Luc Godard, Alain Robbe-Grillet, Bernardo Bertolucci, Nicolas Roeg, John Boorman, and Terry Gilliam.

According to the 1998 documentary The Fear of God: 25 Years of "The Exorcist", the poster shot for the 1973 film The Exorcist was inspired by Magritte's The Empire of Light. Gary Numan's 1979 album The Pleasure Principle is a reference to Magritte's painting of the same name.

Magritte's work was influential in the entire 1992 movie Toys but especially on a break-in scene featuring Robin Williams and Joan Cusack in a music video hoax. Many of Magritte's works were used directly in that scene. In the 1999 movie The Thomas Crown Affair, Magritte's The Son of Man prominently features in the plot.

Ironically, given Magritte's early forgery of Belgian banknotes, a 500 Belgian franc banknote, in the last 1994–1998 series before the franc was replaced by the euro, was issued to celebrate Magritte's centenary year.

A location in Brussels has been named Ceci n'est pas une rue ("This is not a street").

Belgian actor Pierre Gervais plays Magritte in the 2025 television series This Is Not a Murder Mystery.

The Belgium national football team's away kit at the 2026 FIFA World Cup is inspired by Magritte's works.

== Magritte Museum and other collections ==
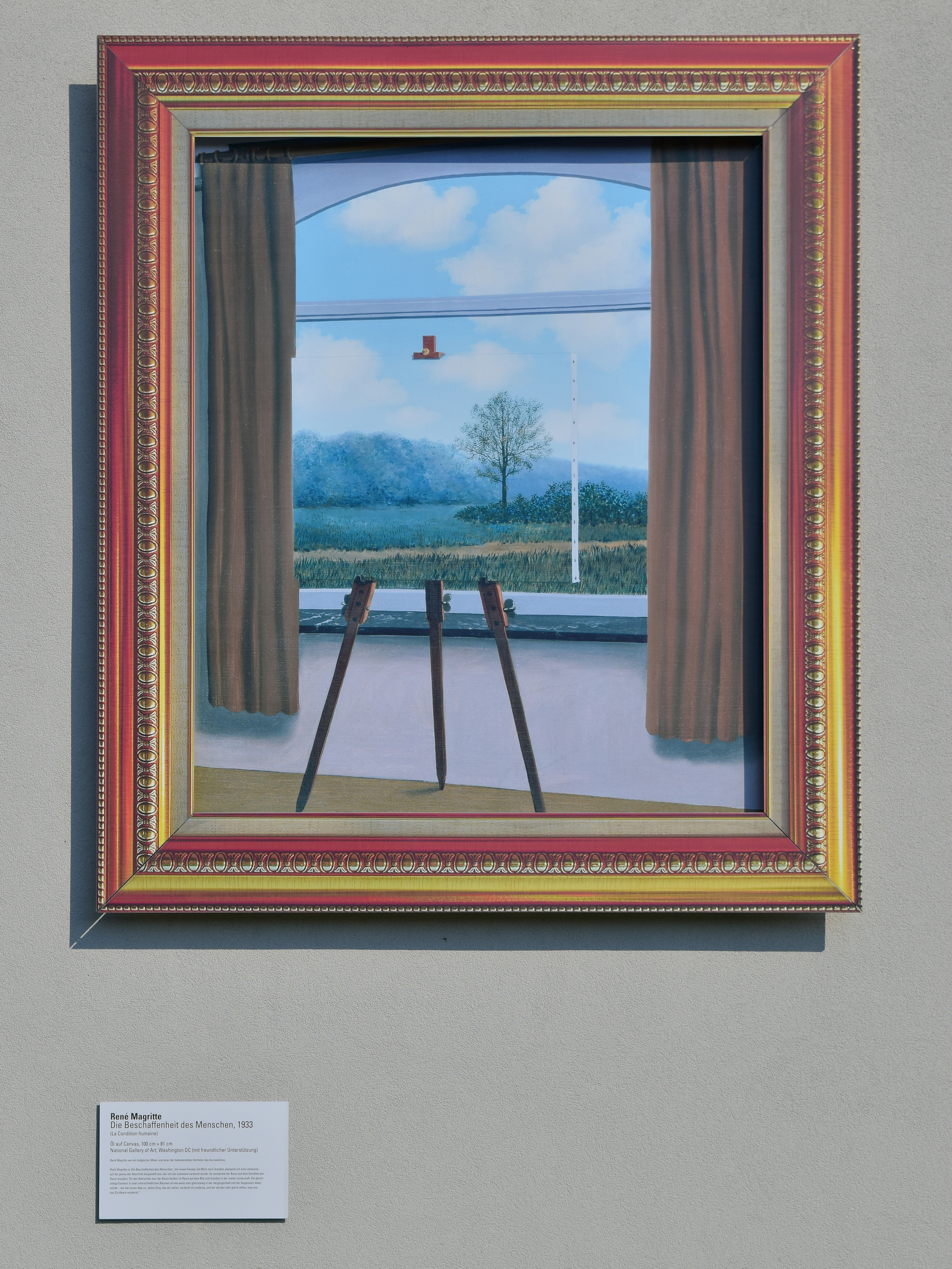
The copy of Magritte's The Human Condition, on the facade of the New Middle School in Liebenau, Freistadt district

The Magritte Museum opened to the public on 30 May 2009 in Brussels. Housed in the five-level neo-classical Hotel Altenloh, on the Place Royale, it displays some 200 original Magritte paintings, drawings, and sculptures, including The Return, Scheherazade and The Empire of Light. This multidisciplinary permanent installation is the biggest Magritte archive anywhere and most of the work is directly from the collection of the artist's widow, Georgette Magritte, and from Irene Hamoir Scutenaire, his primary collector. Additionally, the museum includes Magritte's experiments with photography from 1920 on and the short Surrealist films he made from 1956 on.

Another museum is at 135 Rue Esseghem in Brussels, Magritte's former home, where he lived with his wife from 1930 to 1954. Olympia (1948), a nude portrait of Magritte's wife reportedly worth about US$1.1 million, was stolen from this museum on the morning of 24 September 2009 by two armed men. It was returned to the museum in January 2012 in exchange for a 50,000-Euro payment from the museum's insurer. The thieves reportedly agreed to the deal because they could not sell the painting on the black market due to its fame.

The Menil Collection in Houston, Texas, holds one of the most significant collections of dada and surrealist work in the United States, including dozens of oil paintings, gouaches, drawings, and bronzes by Magritte. John de Menil and Dominique de Menil initiated and funded the catalogue raisonné of Magritte's oeuvre, published between 1992 and 1997 in five volumes, with an addendum in 2012. Major oil paintings in the Menil Collection include The Meaning of Night (1927), The Eternally Obvious (1930), The Rape (1934), The Listening Room (1952), and Golconda (1953). They are typically exhibited a few at a time on a rotating basis with other surrealist works in the collection.

== Selected list of works ==
- 1920 Landscape
- 1922 The Station and L'Écuyère
- 1923 Self-portrait, Sixth Nocturne, Georgette at the Piano and Donna
- 1925 The Bather and The Window
- 1926 The Lost Jockey, The Mind of the Traveler, Sensational News, The Difficult Crossing, The Vestal's Agony, The Midnight Marriage, The Musings of a Solitary Walker, After the Water my Butts, Popular Panorama, Landscape and The Encounter
- 1927 The Enchanted Pose
- 1927 Young Girl Eating a Bird, The Oasis (started in 1925), Le Double Secret, The Meaning of Night, Let Out of School, The Man from the Sea, The Tiredness of Life, The Light-breaker, A Passion for Light, The Menaced Assassin, Reckless Sleeper, La Voleuse, The Fast Hope, L'Atlantide and The Muscles of the Sky
- 1928 The Lining of Sleep (started in 1927), Intermission (started in 1927), The Adulation of Space (started in 1927), The Flowers of the Abyss, Discovery, The Lovers I & II, The Voice of Space, The False Mirror, The Daring Sleeper, The Acrobat's Ideas, The Automaton, The Empty Mask, Reckless Sleeper, The Secret Life and Attempting the Impossible
- 1929 The Treachery of Images (started in 1928), Threatening Weather and On the Threshold of Liberty
- 1930 Pink Belles, Tattered Skies, The Eternally Obvious, The Lifeline, The Annunciation and Celestial Perfections
- 1931 The Voice of the Air, Summer and The Giantess
- 1932 The Universe Unmasked
- 1933 Elective Affinities, The Human Condition and The Unexpected Answer
- 1934 The Rape, La Magie Noire
- 1935 The Discovery of Fire, The Human Condition, Revolution, Perpetual Motion, Collective Invention and The Portrait
- 1936 Surprise Answer, Clairvoyance, The Healer, The Philosopher's Lamp, The Heart Revealed a portrait of Tita Thirifays, Spiritual Exercises, Portrait of Irène Hamoir, La Méditation and Forbidden Literature
- 1937 The Future of Statues, The Black Flag, Not to be Reproduced, Portrait of Edward James and Portrait of Rena Schitz, On the Threshold of Liberty
- 1938 Time Transfixed, The Domain of Arnheim, Steps of Summer and Stimulation Objective
- 1939 Victory, The Palace of Memories
- 1940 The Return, The Wedding Breakfast and Les Grandes Espérances
- 1941 The Break in the Clouds
- 1942 Misses de L'Isle Adam, L'Île au Trésor, Memory, Black Magic, Les compagnons de la peur and The Misanthropes
- 1943 The Return of the Flame, Universal Gravitation and Monsieur Ingres's Good Days
- 1944 The Good Omens
- 1945 Treasure Island, Les Rencontres Naturelles and Black Magic
- 1946 L'Intelligence and Les Mille et une Nuits
- 1947 La Philosophie dans le boudoir, The Cicerone, The Liberator, The Fair Captive, La Part du Feu and The Red Model
- 1948 Blood Will Tell, Memory, The Mountain Dweller, The Art of Life, The Pebble, The Lost Jockey, God's Solon, Shéhérazade, L'Ellipse and Famine and The Taste of Sorrow
- 1949 Megalomania, Elementary Cosmogony, and Perspective, the Balcony
- 1950 Making an Entrance, The Legend of the Centuries, Towards Pleasure, The Labors of Alexander, The Empire of Light II, The Fair Captive and The Art of Conversation, The Survivor
- 1951 David's Madame Récamier (parodying the Portrait of Madame Récamier), Pandora's Box, The Song of the Violet, The Spring Tide and The Smile
- 1952 Personal Values and Le Sens de la Pudeur and The Explanation
- 1953 Golconda, The Listening Room and a fresco, The Enchanted Domain, for the Knokke Casino, Le chant des sirènes
- 1954 The Invisible World and The Empire of Light
- 1955 Memory of a Journey and The Mysteries of the Horizon
- 1956 The Sixteenth of September; The Ready-made Bouquet
- 1957 The Fountain of Youth; The Enchanted Domain
- 1958 The Golden Legend, Hegel's Holiday, The Banquet and The Familiar World
- 1959 The Castle in the Pyrenees, The Battle of the Argonne, The Anniversary, The Month of the Grape Harvest and La clef de verre (The Glass Key)
- 1960 The Memoirs of a Saint
- 1962 The Great Table, The Healer, Waste of Effort, Mona Lisa (circa 1962) and L'embeillie (circa 1962)
- 1963 The Great Family, The Open Air, The Beautiful Season, Princes of the Autumn, Young Love, La Recherche de la Vérité and The Telescope and " The Art of Conversation"
- 1964 Le soir qui tombe (Evening Falls), The Great War, The Great War on Facades, The Son of Man and Song of Love
- 1965 Le Blanc-Seing, Carte Blanche, The Thought Which Sees, Ages Ago and The Beautiful Walk (circa 1965), Good Faith
- 1966 The Shades, The Happy Donor, The Gold Ring, The Pleasant Truth, The Two Mysteries, The Pilgrim and The Mysteries of the Horizon
- 1967 Les Grâces Naturelles, La Géante, The Blank Page, Good Connections, The Art of Living, L'Art de Vivre and several bronze sculptures based on Magritte's previous works

== See also ==
- Magritte Museum, part of the Royal Museum of Fine Arts of Belgium.
- René Magritte Museum, a museum in Jette in Brussels, in the house where Magritte lived and worked for 24 years, between 1930 and 1954.
- List of Belgian painters
- List of paintings by Rene Magritte
