= 1927 in art =

Events from the year 1927 in art.

== Events ==
- May – Stanley Spencer moves to Burghclere (England) to work on the Sandham Memorial Chapel.
- May 16 – A pair of oval rooms built at the Musée de l'Orangerie in Paris as a permanent home for eight of Monet's water lily paintings is opened by the Government of France.
- June 28 – Unveiling of "The Building of Britain" series of historical paintings by various artists in St Stephen's Hall of the Palace of Westminster in London. Charles Sims' King John confronted by his Barons assembled in force at Runnymede gives unwilling consent to Magna Carta, the foundation of justice and individual freedom in England, 1215 attracts criticism from the press, Members of Parliament and other artists for its idiosyncrasy.
- July 24 – Unveiling of Menin Gate Memorial to the Missing at Ypres, Belgium, designed by Sir Reginald Blomfield.
- September 29 – Unveiling of 107th Infantry Memorial in Central Park, New York City, designed by Karl Illava, a former sergeant in the regiment.
- October – Clarice Cliff begins test marketing her 'Bizarre' pottery decoration in the UK.
- October 4 – Gutzon Borglum begins work on Mount Rushmore National Memorial in the United States.
- November – Ferens Art Gallery in Kingston upon Hull, England, opens.
- n.d. – Aristide Colotte opens his studio in Nancy, France, where he produces glasswork and carved crystal statues.
- n.d. – The earliest known photomural is created by photographers Kaufmann & Fabry in Chicago for socialite Bobsy Goodspeed.

== Exhibitions ==
- February – Stanley Spencer has his first solo exhibition, at the Goupil Gallery in London.
- April–May – Ben and Winifred Nicholson and Christopher Wood exhibit at the Beaux Arts Gallery in London.
- May 6-May 28 – The Machine-Age Exposition is held in New York.
- June 25–July 2 – Federico García Lorca exhibits a series of drawings at the Galeries Dalmau in Barcelona.
- Alice Prin ("Kiki de Montparnasse") has an exhibition of her own paintings at the Galerie au Sacre du Printemps in Paris.

== Awards ==
- Archibald Prize: George W. Lambert – Mrs Murdoch

== Works ==
- Ansel Adams – Parmelian Prints of the High Sierras (photographic portfolio)
- Ernst Barlach – Der schwebende Engel ("The Floating Angel", sculpture (original cast destroyed))
- Max Beckmann – Self-Portrait in Tuxedo
- Edwin Blashfield – Spring Scattering Stars
- Pompeo Coppini – Statue of George Washington (bronze, Portland, Oregon)
- Salvador Dalí – Apparatus and Hand
- Charles Demuth – My Egypt
- Max Ernst
  - Forest and Dove
  - The Wood
- George Grosz – Self-Portrait, Warning
- Edward Hopper
  - Automat
  - Coast Guard Station, Two Lights, Maine
- Paul Klee – Limits of Reason
- Karl Illava (sculptor) and Rogers and Haneman (architects) – 107th Infantry Memorial, New York City
- Gaston Lachaise – Floating Figure
- Fernand Léger – Nude on a Red Background
- Tamara de Lempicka
  - The Dream
  - La tunique rose
- Will Longstaff – Menin Gate at Midnight
- L. S. Lowry
  - Coming Out of School
  - Oldfield Road Dwellings, Salford
  - Peel Park, Salford
  - A View from the Bridge
- René Magritte
  - The Enchanted Pose
  - Le Joueur Secret (The Secret Player)
  - The Menaced Assassin
  - The Meaning of Night
- Henri Matisse – Reclining Nude, Back
- Anne Marie Carl-Nielsen – Equestrian Statue of King Christian IX of Denmark (Christiansborg Palace, Copenhagen)
- Joan Miró – Painting (Blue Star)
- Georgia O'Keeffe –
  - Black Abstraction
  - Radiator Building - Night, New York
- Frederick Roth – Equestrian statue of George Washington (bronze, Washington's Headquarters, Morristown, New Jersey)
- Antonio Sciortino – Great Siege Monument
- Lasar Segall – Portrait of Mário de Andrade
- Charles Sheeler – Criss-Crossed Conveyors, River Rouge Plant, Ford Motor Company (photograph)
- Stanley Spencer – The Resurrection, Cookham
- Lajos Tihanyi – Portrait of Tristan Tzara (Hungarian National Gallery)
- Henry Scott Tuke – The Critics
- Alexander Weygers – Mourning (sculpture)
- Rex Whistler – The Expedition in Pursuit of Rare Meats (mural, Tate Gallery restaurant, London)

== Births ==
=== January to June ===
- January 1 – Jean-Paul Mousseau, Canadian artist (d.1991)
- January 15 – Olle Zetterquist, Swedish artist (d.2024)
- January 20 – Olivier Strebelle, Belgian sculptor (d.2017)
- January 23 – Fred Williams, Australian painter and printmaker (d. 1982)
- February 3 – Sarah Jiménez, Mexican artist (d. 2017)
- February 14 – Myles Murphy, English painter (d.2016)
- March 5 – Jan Snoeck, Dutch sculptor and ceramist (d. 2018)
- March 13 – Robert Denning, American interior designer (d.2005)
- March 19 – Gisèle Lestrange, French graphic artist (d.1991)
- March 31 – David Budd, American abstract painter (d.1991)
- April 6 – Joash Woodrow, English artist (d.2006)
- April 7 – Wolfgang Mattheuer, German painter (d.2004)
- April 15 – David Carritt, English art historian, dealer and critic (d.1982)
- April 16 – John Chamberlain, American sculptor (d. 2011)
- April 25 – Albert Uderzo, French comic book artist and scriptwriter (Asterix) (d. 2020)
- May 5 – Eva Fuka, Czech-born photographer
- June 5 — Ladjane Bandeira, Brazilian artist and journalist (d. 1999)
- June 25 – Patricia Martin Bates, Canadian artist
- June 29
  - Dick Martin, American illustrator (d. 1990)
  - Kenneth Snelson, American contemporary sculptor and photographer (d. 2016)

=== July to December ===
- July 14 – Mike Esposito, American comic book artist (d. 2010)
- July 24
  - Alex Katz, American figurative artist
  - Robert Rosenblum, American art historian (d. 2006).
- August 8 – Bruno Caruso, Sicilian painter, illustrator, writer, graphic designer and political activist (d. 2018)
- August 23
  - Dick Bruna, Dutch illustrator (d. 2017)
  - Allan Kaprow, American painter, assemblagist and art theorist (d. 2006)
- August 26 – Ma Jir Bo, Chinese Realist oil painter (d. 1985)
- September 15 – Margaret Keane, American painter (d. 2022)
- September 22 – Norbert Lynton, British art historian and Professor of the History of Art (d. 2007)
- October 3 – Kenojuak Ashevak, Canadian Inuk artist (d. 2013)
- October 4 – Wolf Kahn, German-born painter (d. 2020)
- October 29
  - Pierre Alechinsky, Belgian painter, engraver and calligrapher
  - Alfred Leslie, American painter and filmmaker
- November 2 – Steve Ditko, American comic book artist (d.2018)
- November 23 – Guy Davenport, American writer, translator, illustrator, painter and teacher (d. 2005)
- December 24 – John Glashan, Scottish cartoonist, illustrator and playwright (d. 1999)
- December 30 – Jan Kubíček, Czech constructivist painter, sculptor (d. 2013)

== Deaths ==
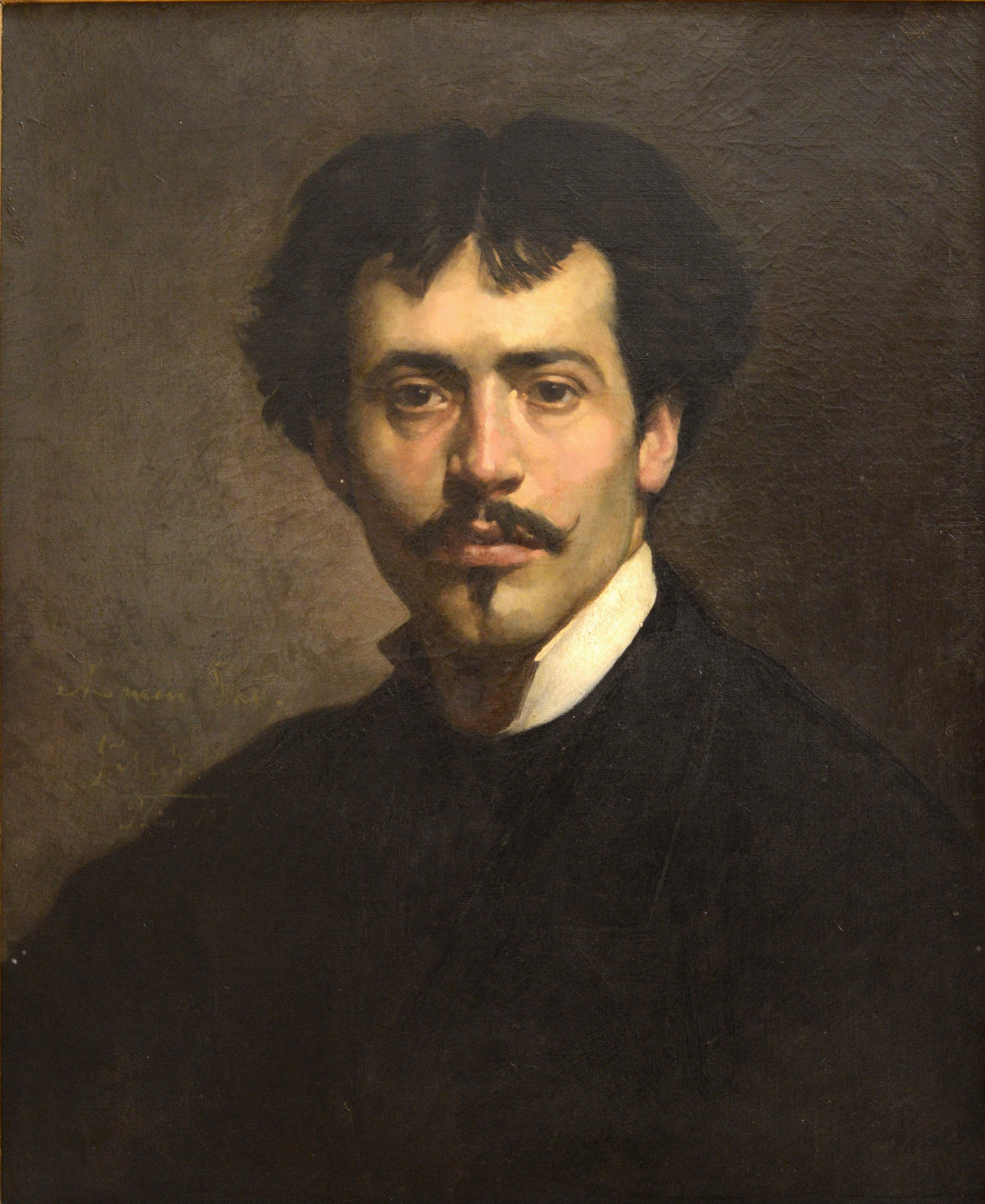
João Marques de Oliveira

- January 1 – Isabelle de Steiger, painter, theosophist, occultist and writer (b. 1836)
- January 15 – Harald Giersing, painter (b. 1881)
- February 28 – Sir Luke Fildes, painter and illustrator (b. 1843)
- March 6 - Marie Spartali Stillman, English model and painter (b. 1844)
- March 23 – Paul César Helleu, portrait painter (b. 1859)
- April 3 – Frederick Morgan, painter (b. c.1850)
- May 10 – Andrea Gram, painter (b. 1853)
- May 11 – Juan Gris, painter (b. 1887)
- May 24, 1927 – Frederick Melville DuMond (b. 1887)
- May 28 – Boris Kustodiev, painter and stage designer (b. 1878)
- June 26 – Armand Guillaumin, impressionist painter and lithographer (b. 1841)
- June 28 – Otto Bache, painter of historical subjects (b. 1839)
- July 10 – Louise Abbéma, Impressionist painter (b. 1853)
- July 27 – Solomon Joseph Solomon, portrait painter (b. 1860)
- August 4 – Eugène Atget, photographer (b. 1857)
- August 18 – Sascha Schneider, painter and sculptor (b. 1870)
- September 19 – Michael Ancher, painter (b. 1849)
- October 7 – Paul Sérusier, abstract painter (b. 1864)
- October 9 – João Marques de Oliveira, Portuguese painter (b. 1853)
- November 21 – Laurits Tuxen, painter (b. 1853)
- November 25 – József Rippl-Rónai, painter (b. 1861)
- December 13 – Maria Oakey Dewing, American painter (b. 1845)
- date unknown
  - Adolphe Demange, portrait painter (b. 1857)
  - Caroline Reboux, fashion designer (b. 1837)
  - Madame Virot, fashion designer (b. 1826)

== See also ==
- 1927 in fine arts of the Soviet Union
