= 107th Infantry Memorial =

Sculpture in Manhattan, New York, U.S.

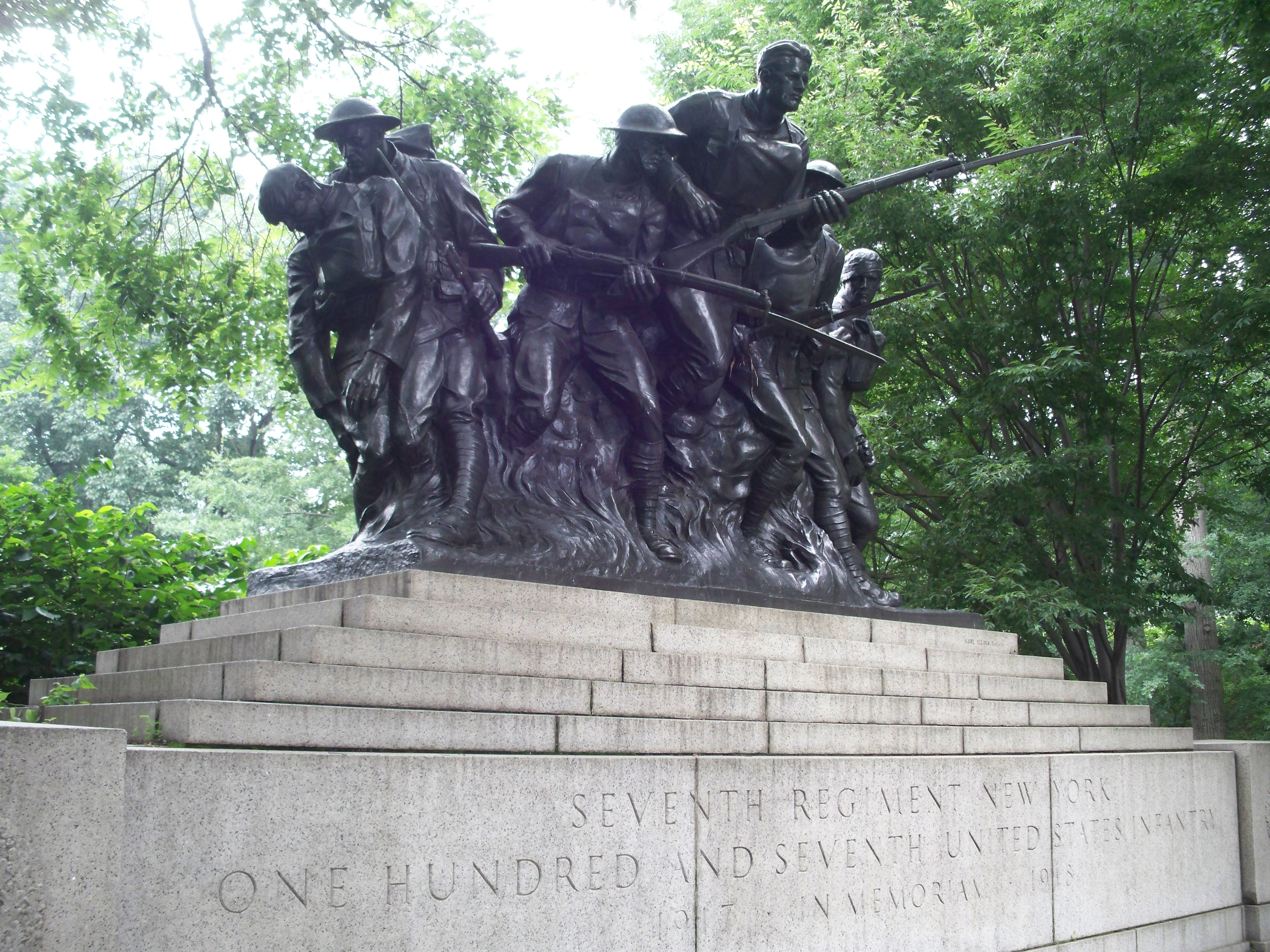
- The memorial in 2008
- Artist: Karl Morningstar Illava
- Year: 1927 --
- Medium: Bronze
- Subject: Seven World War I-era soldiers
- Dimensions: 300 cm (9'11" ft × 15'8" ft × 10 ft)
- Location: Manhattan, New York
- 40.76927°N 73.96937°W

The 107th Infantry Memorial is an outdoor bronze sculpture and memorial located at the intersection of East 67th Street and Fifth Avenue in Central Park, in Manhattan, New York, United States, which honors members of the 107th Infantry who died during World War I. Created by the sculptor Karl Morningstar Illava (1896–1954), who "drew from his own experience serving as a sergeant with the 107th," according to the New York City Department of Parks & Recreation, the sculpture cost an estimated $60,000 at the time of its construction, depicts the actions of seven World War I-era soldiers, and rests on a 25-foot-wide stepped granite base designed by architects Rogers & Haneman.

It was donated by the Seventh Regiment New York 107th United States Infantry Memorial Committee, which was headed by C. I. Debevoise, former colonel and commanding officer of the 107th Infantry.

== Design and construction ==
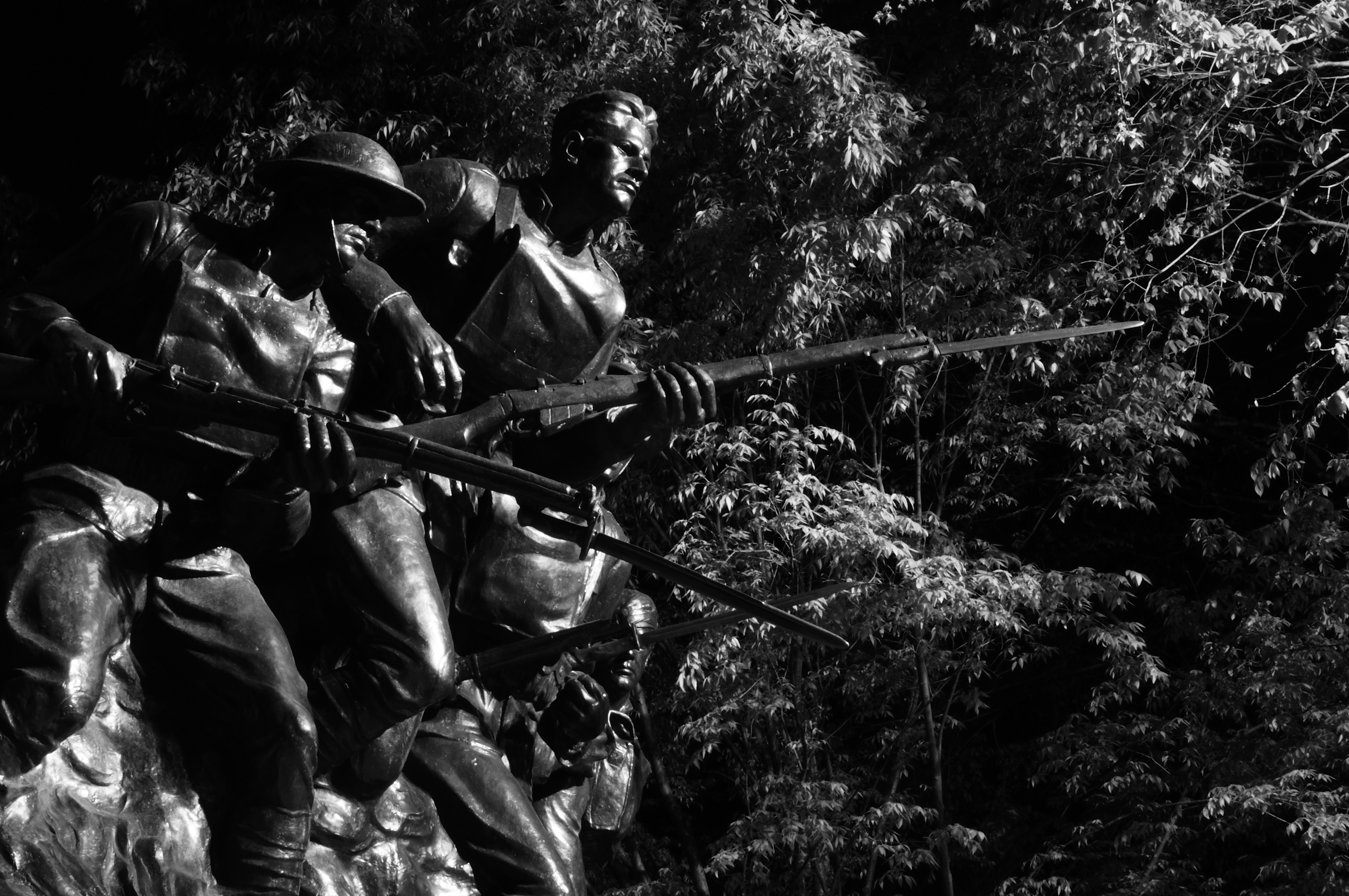
The memorial at night

After deciding to make seven World War I-era soldiers the focus of his sculpture, sculptor Karl Illava worked with foundry experts at the Fond G. Vignali in Florence, Italy to have the figures cast in bronze in 1927. According to the city's parks department website, Illava used his own hands as the model for the hands of his subjects, and staged the "doughboys" in a manner depicting motion, "advancing from the wooded thicket bordering Central Park, as if mounting a charge." The bronze work was then anchored to a plinth on a stepped pedestal of North Jay granite designed by Rogers & Haneman, architects.

The sculpture itself is 9 feet by 11 inches high, 15 feet by 8 inches wide, and 10 feet deep while the pedestal is 7 feet, 7 tall and 32 feet, 8 wide. The inscription on the monument reads: "SEVENTH REGIMENT NEW YORK / ONE HUNDRED AND SEVENTH UNITED STATES INFANTRY / 1917 IN MEMORIAM 1918."

== History ==
=== 20th century ===
More than 5,000 people attended the dedication of the monument on September 29, 1927. The date was chosen to commemorate the 9th anniversary of the Battle of St. Quentin Canal during which the regiment attacked the Hindenburg Line. Speakers included Colonel Hanford MacNider, the Assistant Secretary of War, New York State Senator William T. Byrne, Major General John F. O'Ryan, and General Alexander S. Diven. The sons of two fallen members of the 107th, Captain Clinton E. Fisk of Company D and Captain Fancher Nicoll of Company L., unveiled the monument. When it was unveiled, many people speculated that the lead soldier was modelled after boxer Gene Tunney, but "[o]fficers of the regiment denied this, saying the sculptor merely had striven to emphasize the characteristic expression of the typical soldier in action" and the sculptor said the figure was based on advertising executive Paul Cornell.

On Armistice Day 1927, the 107th Infantry Post of the American Legion held a religious service and Rev. Peter E. Hoey placed a floral wreath at the memorial to pay tribute to the war dead.

In October 1973, The Commanding officer, Sir Gregor MacGregor of the Scots Guards, held a wreath laying ceremony at the statue to commemorate the units World War I service with the British Army.

=== 21st century ===
In May 2024, pro-Palestinian protesters vandalized the memorial to protest the Gaza war. The memorial was graffitied and an American flag was burned in front of the statue representing an Anti-American sentiment among the protesters due to the United States support for Israel in the Gaza war. Some Palestinian flag stickers were then placed on the memorial's base.

== See also ==
- 107th Infantry Regiment (United States)
- 1927 in art
