= 107th Infantry Regiment (United States) =

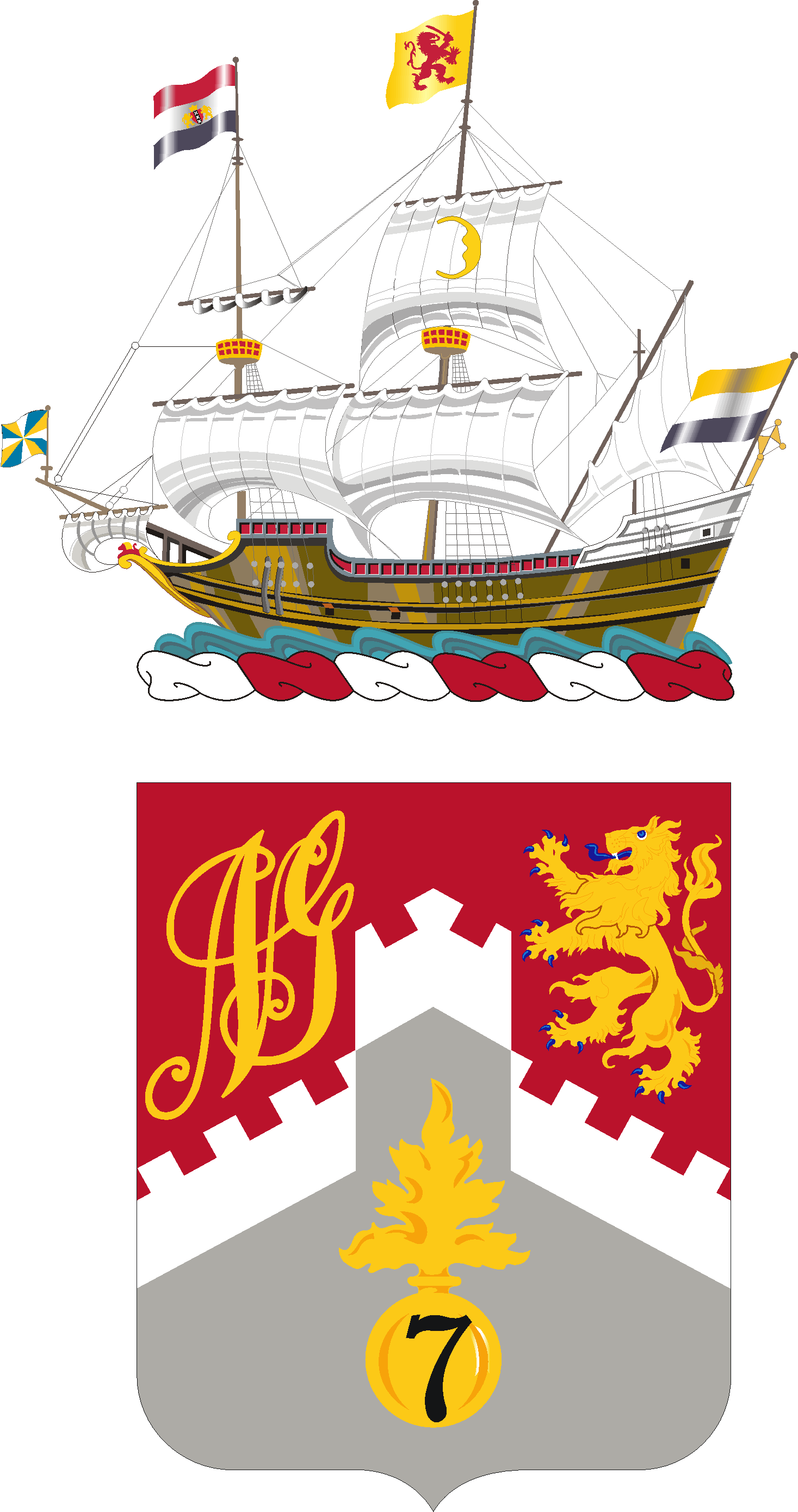
- Coat of arms
- Active: 1922–1993
- Country: United States
- Allegiance: New York
- Branch: New York Army National Guard
- Size: Regiment
- Nickname: Silk Stocking Regiment
- Mottos: "Pro Patria et Gloria" (For Country and Glory)
- Engagements: World War I World War II

Insignia
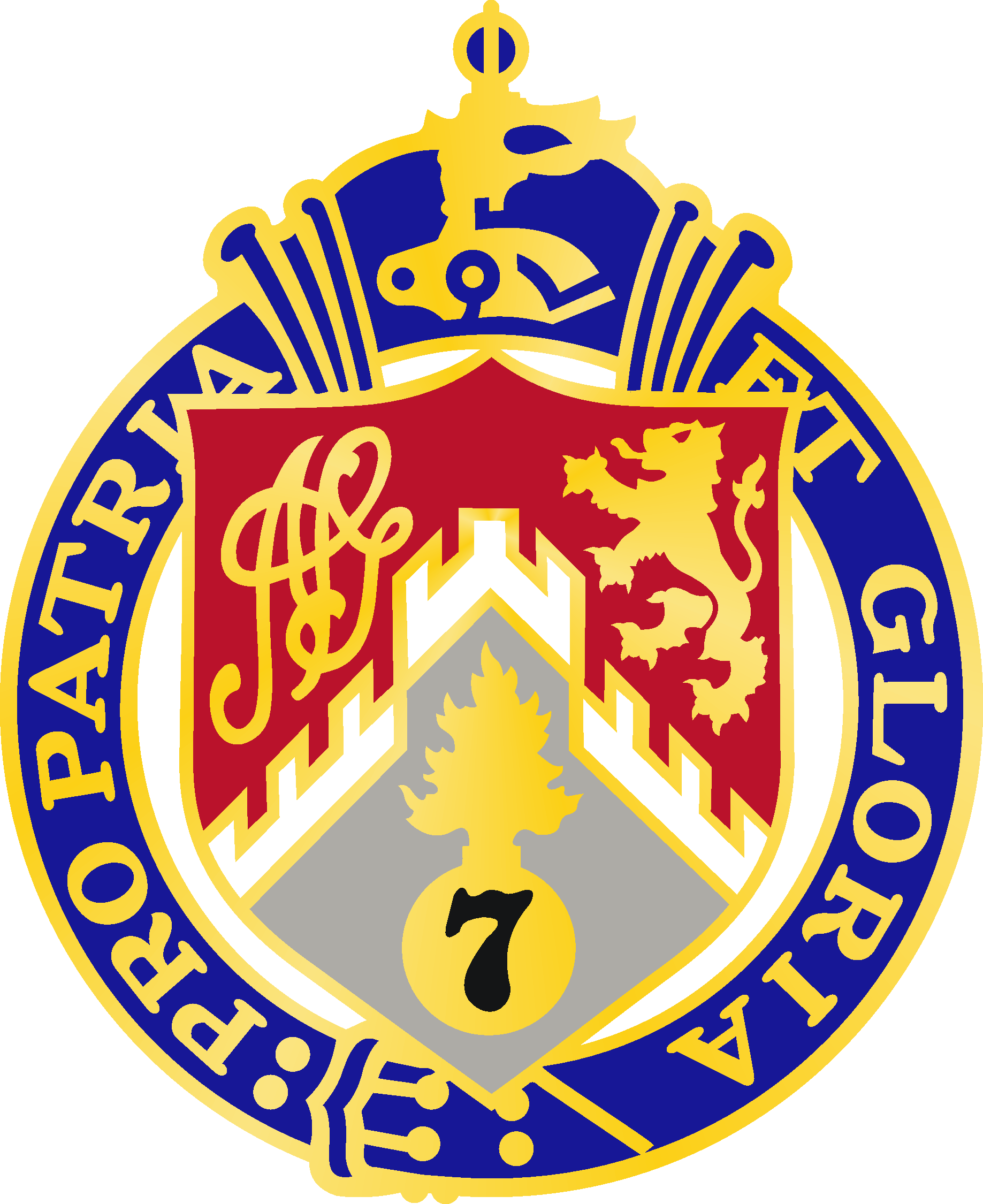
- Distinctive unit insignia

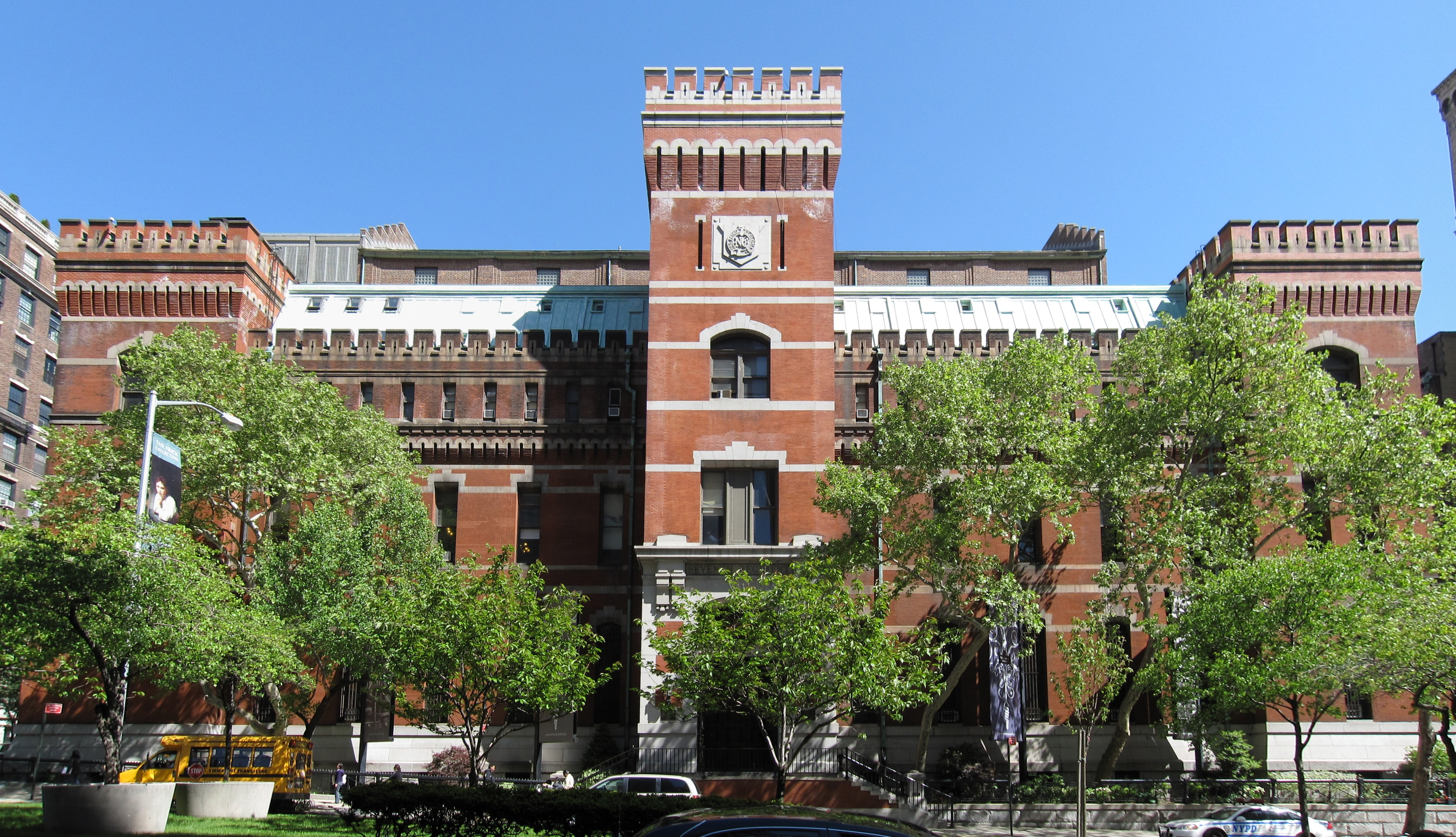
Seventh Regiment Armory, Park Avenue, New York City, 1880, architect Charles W. Clinton.

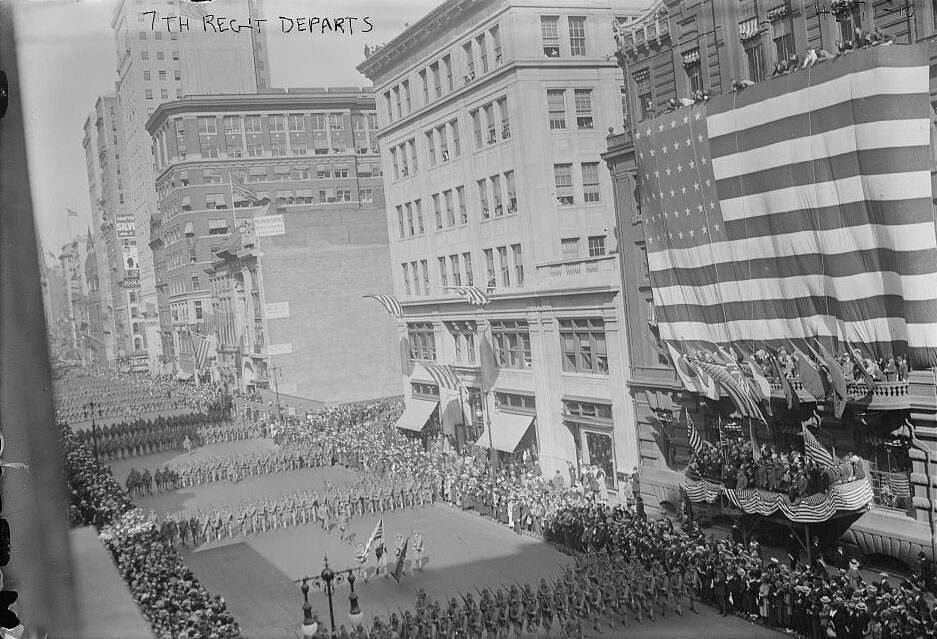
The 7th Regiment, New York National Guard, later the 107th Infantry Regiment, marched off to war on 11 September 1917

The 107th Infantry Regiment was a regiment of the New York Army National Guard. The regiment was formed in 1917 and disestablished in 1993.

The 107th traces its history to the Seventh Regiment of New York (or 7th New York Militia/7th Regiment New York State Militia). Known as the "Silk Stocking Regiment" for the high number of New York City's social elite among its ranks and its armory's location on Park Avenue in the Silk Stocking District of the Upper East Side, it was established in 1806 in response to the blockade of New York Bay in April by warships of the British Navy, whose commanders claimed the right to detain and search American vessels and impress any British subjects serving on them.

== Timeline ==
- 1917: The 7th Regiment is drafted into federal service.
- 1917: Redesignated the 107th Infantry with additional personnel from 1st and 12th Infantry, New York National Guard, and assigned to the 27th Division.
- 1917–1919: The 7th Infantry, New York Guard serves as the Depot (Home) Battalion. 107th Infantry moved to France May 1918, returned to US March 1919. 27th Division including 107th Infantry participated in the Ypres-Lys and Somme Offensive campaigns. Discharged from federal service 2 April 1919.
- 1921–1922: Consolidates with 7th Infantry, New York Guard, and reorganized and federalized as the 107th Infantry.
- 1940: The 107th Infantry is redesignated the 207th Coast Artillery (Anti-Aircraft) Regiment on 1 August.
- 1940: 7th Regiment, New York State Guard is formed.
- 1943: 10 September: The regiment is broken up, reorganized and redesignated as follows:
  - HHB as HHB 207th Anti-Aircraft Artillery Group (served in Normandy, France, Ardennes-Alsace (Battle of the Bulge), Central Europe)
  - 1st Battalion as 771st Anti-Aircraft Artillery Gun Battalion (served in Hawaii and Guam)
  - 2nd Battalion as 7th Anti-Aircraft Artillery Automatic Weapons Battalion (served in Leyte, Philippines, Guam, Okinawa)
  - 3rd Battalion as 247th Anti-Aircraft Artillery Searchlight Battalion (did not serve overseas, inactivated 31 October 1944)
- 1946–1947: Reorganized as the 107th Infantry with headquarters in New York.
- 1957: Relieved from 107th Regimental Combat Team, assigned to 42d Infantry Division.
- 1959: Relieved from 42d Infantry Division, reorganized as 107th Infantry, parent regiment under the Combat Arms Regimental System.
- 1993: the 1st Battalion, 107th Infantry, was deactivated as part of nationwide force structure reductions. The 107th designation was reassigned to the former 205th Support Group, New York Army National Guard, creating the 107th Support Group.

== Memorial in Central Park ==
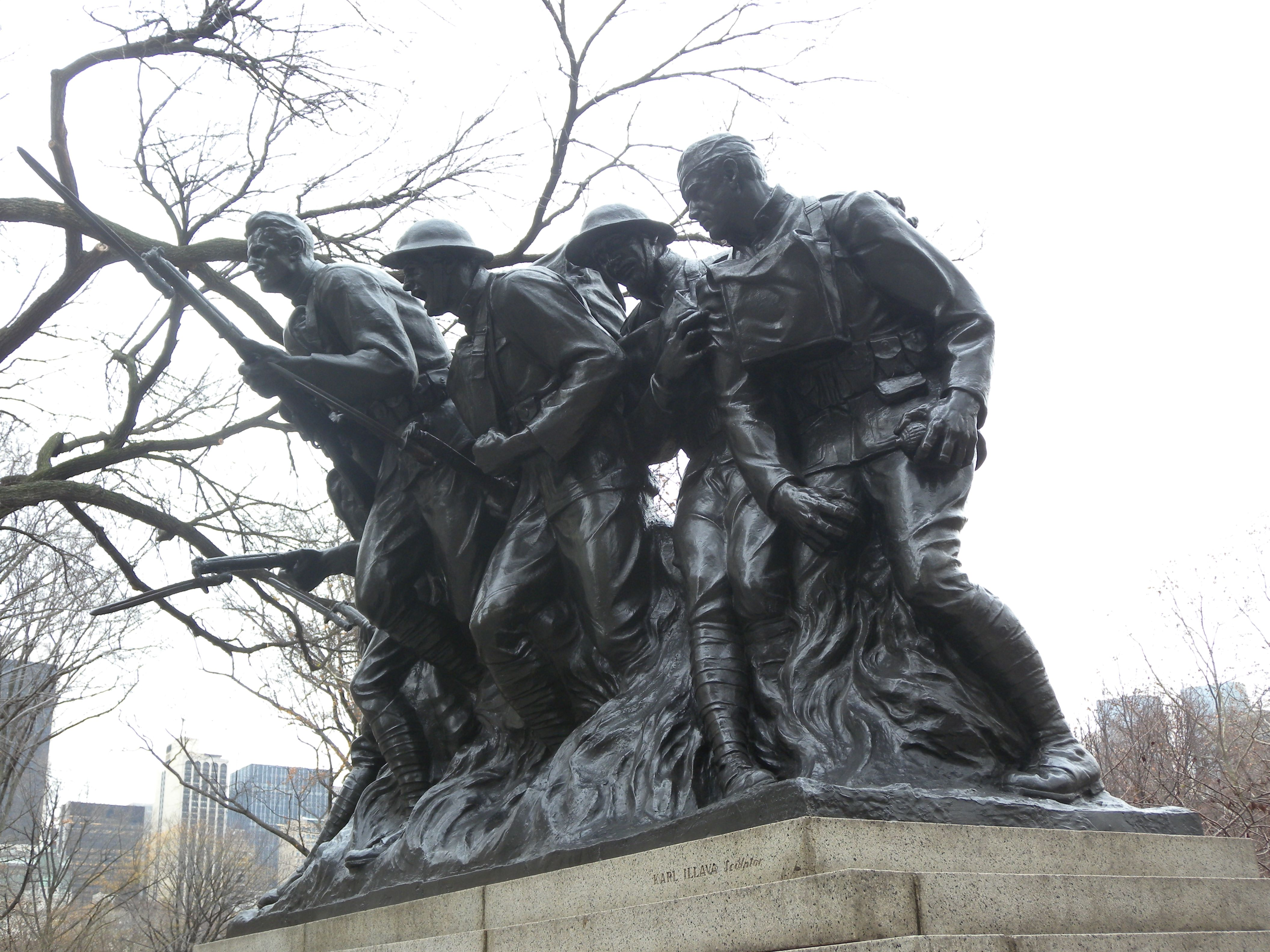
107th Infantry Memorial

The 107th Infantry Memorial is dedicated to the men who served in the 107th Infantry Regiment, originally Seventh Regiment of New York, during World War I. The memorial depicts seven men; the one to the far right carrying two Mills bombs, while supporting the wounded soldier next to him. To his right another infantryman rushes towards the enemy positions, while the helmet-less squad leader and another soldier are approaching the enemy with bayonet fixed Lee–Enfield rifles. To the far left, one soldier is holding a mortally wounded soldier, keeping him on his feet. The bronze memorial was donated by 7th–107th Memorial Committee, and was designed and sculpted by Karl Illava, who served in the 107th IR as a sergeant in World War I. The monument was first conceived about 1920, was made in 1926–1927 and was placed in the park and unveiled in 1927, near the perimeter wall at Fifth Avenue and 67th Street.

== Distinctive unit insignia ==
Description
A Gold color metal and enamel device 1 1/4 inches (3.2 cm) in height consisting of a shield blazoned: Per chevron Gules and Gray, a chevron rompu embattled to chief Argent between in chief the cipher "NG" and a lion rampant Or, and in base a bomb flamant of the last charged with the numeral seven Sable; surmounting a blue circular garter inscribed "PRO PATRIA ET GLORIA" in Gold, buckled Gold and folded at the top and surmounted by a Gold flintlock hammer.
Symbolism
The original units of the regiment were artillery and the bursting bomb, the earliest insignia, represents that assignment. The old uniform was cadet gray; the monogram "N.G." was worn on it. For over fifty years, the 107th Infantry Regiment was the only organization bearing the distinctive title of "National Guard." This designation was adopted by the United States Government for general use in 1869. The rampant lion commemorates service in Picard, France, during World War I. The embattled and broken chevron is emblematic of the breaking of the Hindenburg Line, in which the 107th Infantry Regiment participated. The motto translates to "For Country and Glory."
Background
The distinctive unit insignia was originally approved for the 107th Infantry Regiment on 26 February 1924. It was amended to correct the description on 28 March 1925. It was redesignated for the 207th Coast Artillery Regiment on 24 October 1940. The insignia was redesignated for the 107th Infantry Regiment on 30 March 1951. It was redesignated for the 107th Support Group with the description and symbolism revised effective 1 September 1993.

== Coat of arms ==
Blazon
Shield: Per chevron Gules and Gray, a chevron embattled to chief rompu enhanced Argent between in chief the cipher of the regiment of 1824 (the script monogram N.G.) and a lion rampant both Or and in base the cap of 1815 as worn in 1915 (a flaming bomb charged with the number 7 Sable) of the like.
Crest: That for the regiments and separate battalions of the New York Army National Guard: On a wreath Argent and Gules, the full-rigged ship "Half Moon", all Proper.
Motto: PRO PATRIA ET GLORIA (For Country and Glory).
Symbolism
Shield: The original units of the regiment were artillery and the bursting bomb, the earliest insignia, represents that assignment. The old uniform was cadet gray; the monogram "N.G." was worn on it. For over fifty years the 107th Infantry Regiment was the only organization bearing the distinctive title of "National Guard". This designation was adopted by the United States Government for general use in 1869. The rampant lion commemorates service in Picard, France, during World War I. The embattled and broken chevron is emblematic of the breaking of the Hindenburg Line, in which the 107th Infantry Regiment participated.
Background
The coat of arms was originally approved for the 107th Infantry Regiment on 2 August 1923. It was amended to correct the blazon of the shield on 28 March 1925. It was redesignated for the 207th Coast Artillery Regiment on 24 October 1940. The insignia was redesignated for the 107th Infantry Regiment on 30 March 1951. The coat of arms was cancelled on 3 June 1993, when the distinctive unit insignia was redesignated for the 107th Support Group, as the Group was not eligible to inherit the coat of arms.
