= The Secret Player =

1927 painting by René Magritte

- Le Joueur secret (French)
- Artist: René Magritte
- Year: 1927
- Medium: Oil on canvas
- Movement: Surrealism
- Dimensions: 152 cm × 195 cm (60 in × 77 in)
- Location: Magritte Museum, Brussels

The Secret Player (French: Le Joueur secret) is a 1927 painting by Belgian surrealist artist René Magritte. This surreal oil on canvas mainly depicts two baseball players at the foot of giant bowling pins and under a black leatherback turtle floating in the air. The work is part of the collection of the Royal Museums of Fine Arts of Belgium, it is kept at the Magritte Museum in Brussels. The painting was included in the 2013 exhibition Magritte: The Mystery of the Ordinary 1926–1938, co-organized by the Museum of Modern Art in New York City, the Menil Collection in Houston, Texas, and the Art Institute of Chicago.

== See also ==
- List of paintings by René Magritte
- 1927 in art
