= Apparatus and Hand =

1927 painting by Salvador Dalí

- Artist: Salvador Dalí
- Year: 1927
- Medium: oil on panel
- Dimensions: 62 cm × 47.5 cm (24 in × 18.7 in)
- Location: Salvador Dalí Museum, St. Petersburg, Florida

Apparatus and Hand is a 1927 oil painting by Salvador Dalí. The painting currently resides at the Salvador Dalí Museum in St. Petersburg, Florida. This work is on loan from the collection of Mr. and Mrs. A Reynolds Morse.

== Description ==
This work of surrealistic art showcases a geometric figure with a tumescent red hand protruding from its head. The figure is composed of cones and triangles. Surrounding the structure are ghostly images of nude female figures and torsos superimposed on a blue, watery dreamscape. This piece was done upon Dalí's return from 9 months of military duty. It was during his military career that Dalí began experimenting with new subjects for his work. The Apparatus in the title refers to the geometric figure which is structured much like the human form. The figure has analogues of human arms, legs, an eye, and a head. The triangular being is propped up on what appears to be a cane, which was a leitmotif in Dalí's work representing the fragility of sleep.

The hand atop the figure's head is a reference to Onanism, which was a common theme in his work at the time. This period of Dalí's career is referred to as the Freudian Period. Dalí had a great interest in the ideas of Sigmund Freud, and read his books including The Psychopathology of Everyday Life, and The Interpretation of Dreams, which had recently been published. This painting with its dream-like symbols, shows the influence. Dalí would join the surrealists in 1929, and this pre-surrealist painting shows the influence that group, who also were inspired by Freud. This was during the Avant-Garde movement which was heavily weighted on the writings of Freud. The female images surrounding the geometric figure are representative of thoughts within the mind of the Apparatus. These images represent the delirious erotic thought processes of the artist, which was also a prevailing theme of his work.

To the left of the geometric man is an image of a donkey on its hind legs. The donkey is being consumed by a horde of flies which are attacking its belly. This is indicative of the decomposition of the creature. On the right of the structure is a classically posed female, which is set in contrast to the geometric simplicity of the center image.

== See also ==
- Surrealism
- List of works by Salvador Dalí
- Museum of Modern Art
