= The Wood (Max Ernst) =

Painting by Max Ernst

- Artist: Max Ernst
- Year: 1927
- Medium: Oil on canvas
- Dimensions: 60.5 cm × 81.5 cm (23.82 in × 32.09 in)
- Location: National Museum Cardiff; Cardiff

The Wood (1927) is a painting by the German surrealist Max Ernst.

Ernst was haunted by the atmosphere of forests and by the birds which inhabit them. Here, the herring-bone effect of the trees and the grainy sky reveal his technique of grattage. Layers of paint were applied to the canvas, which was pressed against a sheet of stamped metal and a rough plank and scraped. This work was given to the Contemporary Art Society by Miss A.F. Brown in 1940, and was acquired by the National Museum of Wales in 1991, where it is currently on display.
