= Spring Scattering Stars =

1927 painting by Edwin Blashfield

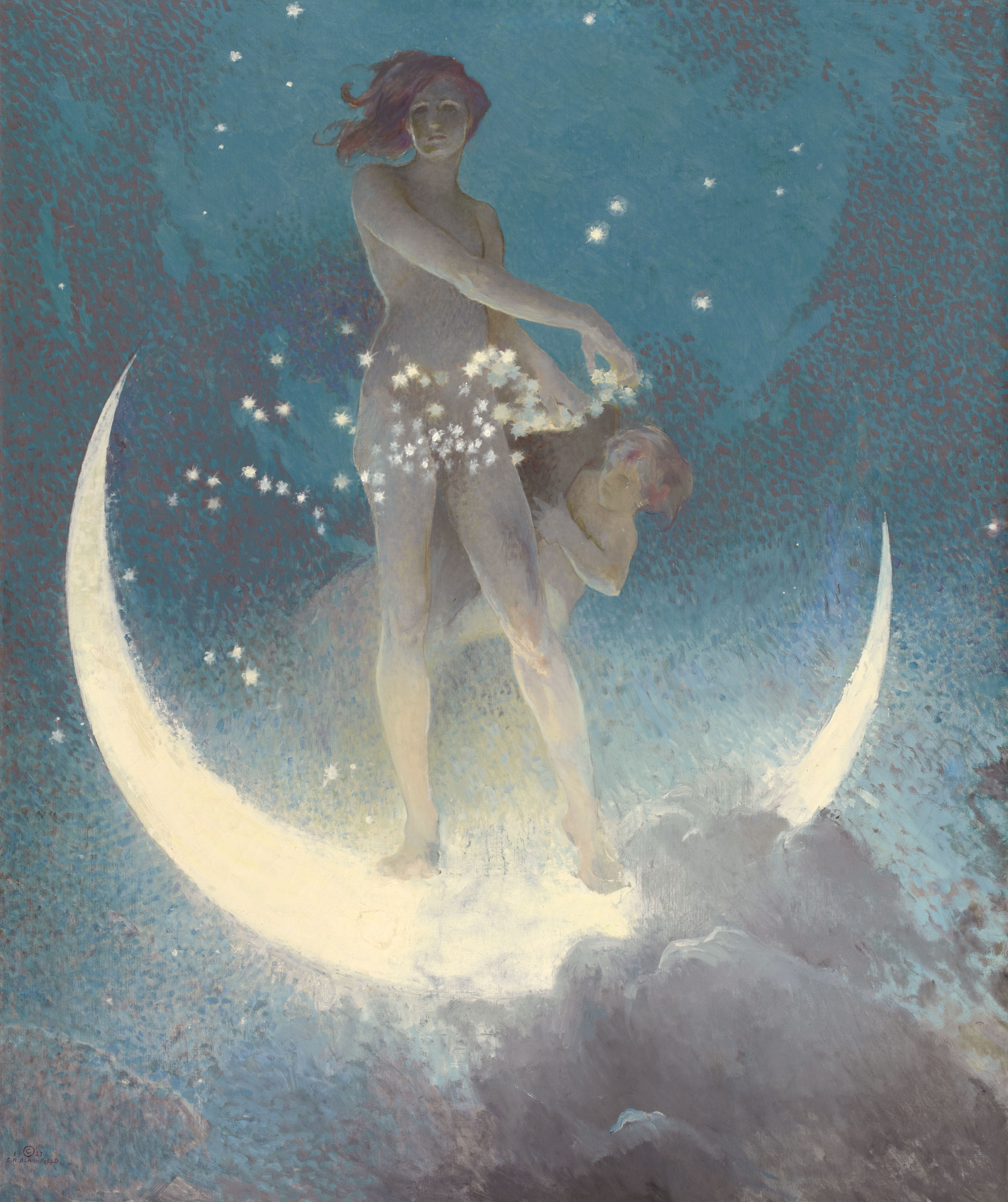
- Artist: Edwin Blashfield
- Year: 1927
- Medium: Oil on canvas
- Dimensions: 130 cm × 110 cm (50 in × 42 in)
- Location: Private collection

Spring Scattering Stars is a 1927 painting by American artist Edwin Blashfield. It is an allegory of spring in which a female nude representing spring stands on a wet moon, scattering stars throughout the sky. The painting is catalogued in the Robert Funk Inventory.

Spring Scattering Stars appeared on the Heritage Auctions after being acquired from the estate of Charles Martignette and is now in a private collection.
