= Edwin Blashfield =

American painter and muralist (1848–1936)

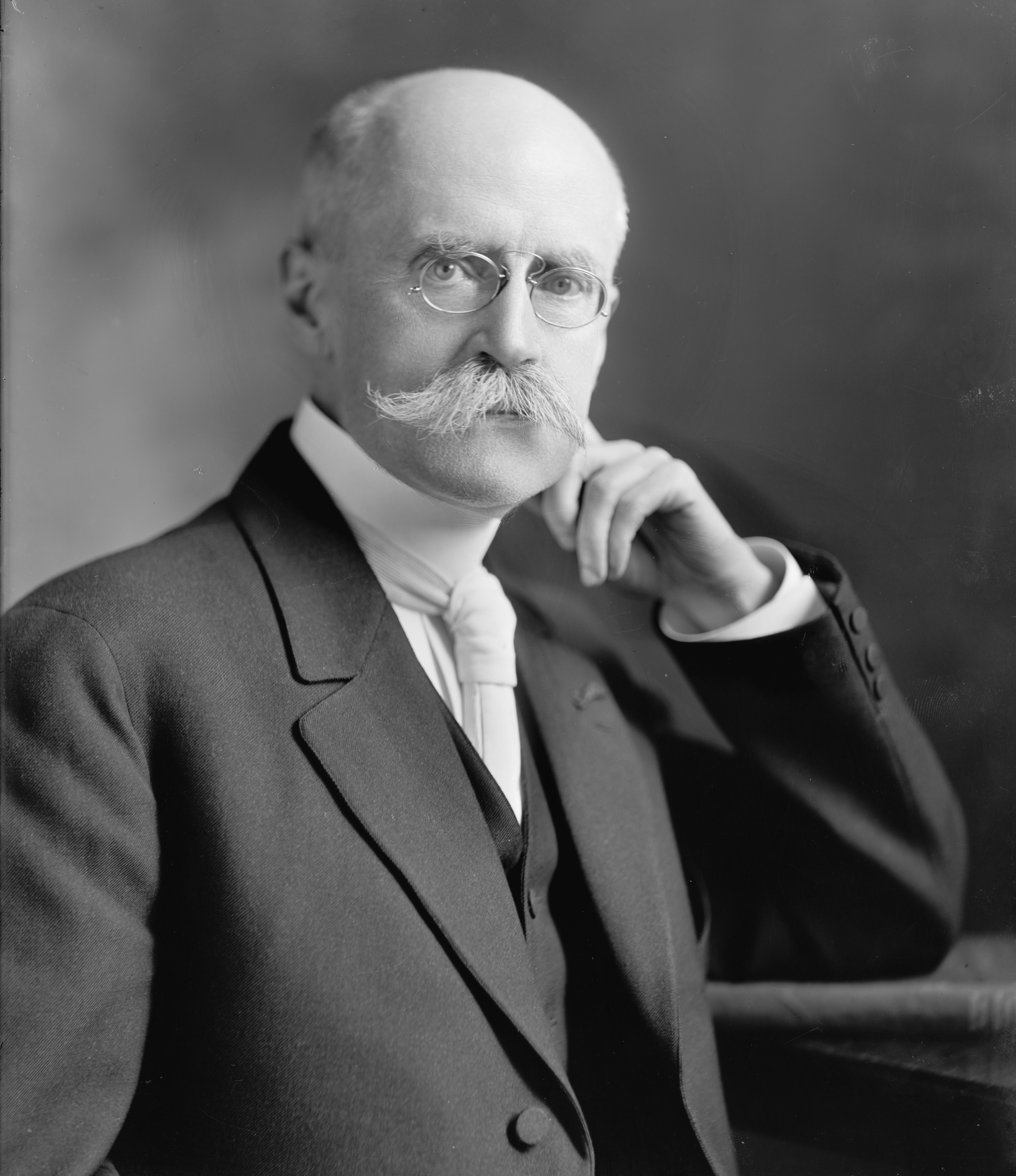
- Blashfield, 1905–1936
- Born: Edwin Howland Blashfield; December 5, 1848; Brooklyn, NY, US
- Died: October 12, 1936 (aged 87)
- Resting place: Woodlawn Cemetery, The Bronx, NY
- Education: Pennsylvania Academy of the Fine Arts
- Known for: Painter, muralist
- Spouse: Evangeline Wilbour Blashfield (m. 1881, d. 1918)

Edwin Howland Blashfield (December 5, 1848 – October 12, 1936) was an American painter and muralist, most known for painting the murals on the dome of the Library of Congress Main Reading Room in Washington, DC.

== Biography ==
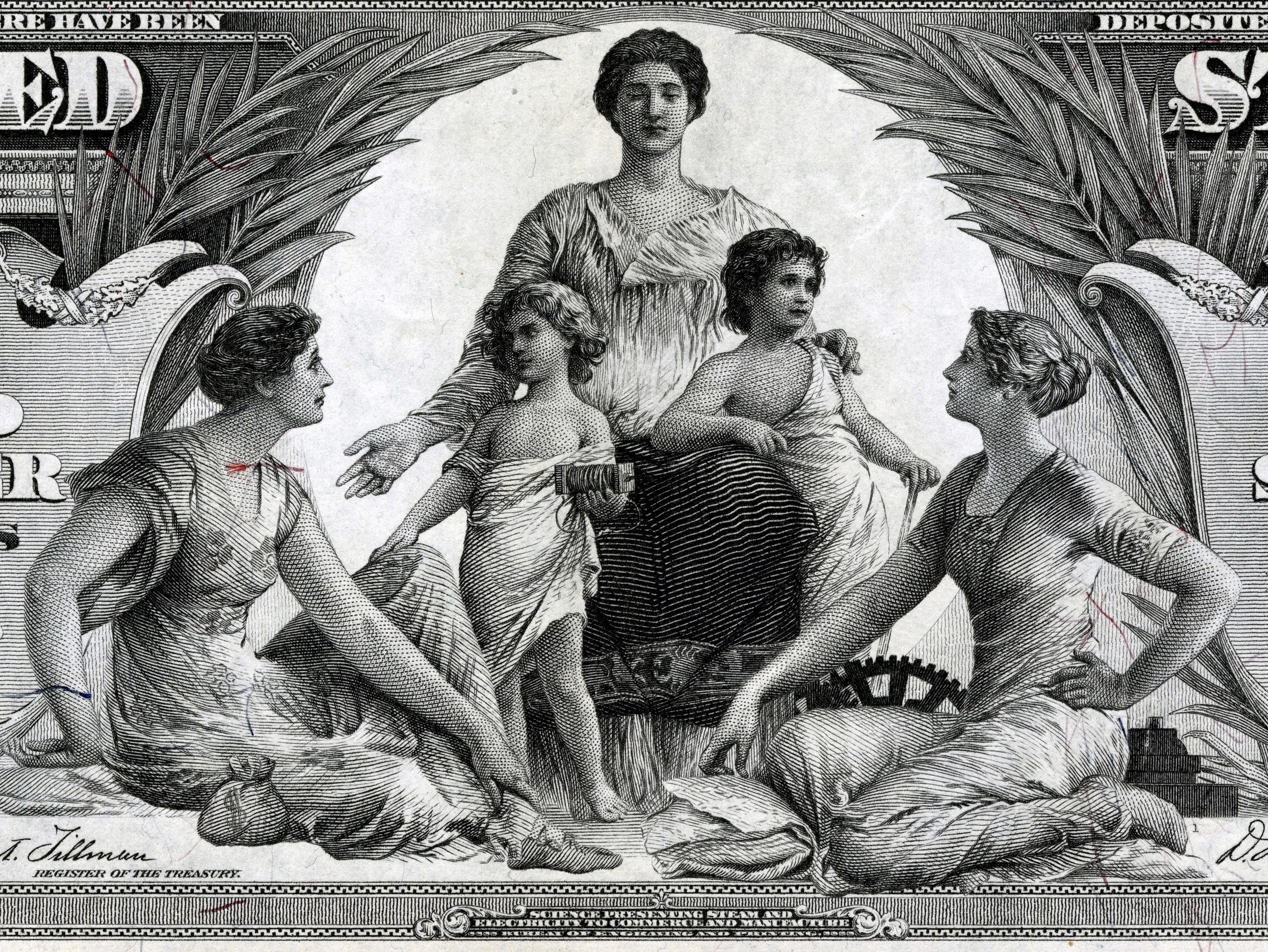
US $2 obverse portrait

Blashfield was born in Brooklyn in 1848 to William H. Blashfield and Eliza Dodd. He studied painting at the Pennsylvania Academy of the Fine Arts after initial coursework in engineering at the Massachusetts Institute of Technology. He moved to Europe in 1867 to study with Léon Joseph Florentin Bonnat in Paris and remained abroad until 1881, traveling, painting, and exhibiting his work in salon shows. His academic background in painting and extensive travels in Italy to study fresco painting melded in work marked by delicacy and beauty of coloring. Following his early success as a genre painter, Blashfield became a widely admired muralist whose work ornamented the dome of the Manufacturers' and Liberal Arts building at the World's Columbian Exposition of 1893, in Chicago, several state capitols, and the central dome of the Library of Congress.

Edwin Blashfield designed the 1896 two-dollar note. The mural on the obverse features Science presenting Steam and Electricity. Science is seated with two boys. The figures of Steam and Electricity are represented by the children and Commerce and Manufacture are portrayed by the two adults. The reverse of the note features portraits of inventors Robert Fulton and Samuel Morse.

He was a member of numerous arts organizations, including the National Academy of Design, the National Society of Mural Painters in which he served as President from 1909 to 1914. American Academy of Arts and Letters, and the National Institute of Arts and Letters. Blashfield served from 1920 to 1926 as President of the National Academy of Design. Among his many honors, Blashfield was awarded a Gold Medal by the National Academy of Design in 1934, an honorary membership in the American Institute of Architects, and an honorary doctorate of fine arts by New York University in 1926. He served on the U.S. Commission of Fine Arts from 1912 to 1916. His circle of friends included sculptor Daniel Chester French, painters John Singer Sargent and Maxfield Parrish, and architect Cass Gilbert. His style was influenced by Pierre Puvis de Chavannes, Jean-Paul Laurens, and Paul Baudry. He married Evangeline Wilbour in 1881 and together they wrote Italian Cities (1900) and translated Vasari's Lives of the Painters (4 vols., 1897). Wilbour died in 1918 and Blashfield married Grace Hall in 1928. He became president of the Society of Mural Painters, and of the Society of American Artists. Blashfield died in 1936 at his summer home on Cape Cod and is interred at Woodlawn Cemetery in The Bronx, New York City.

== Gallery ==
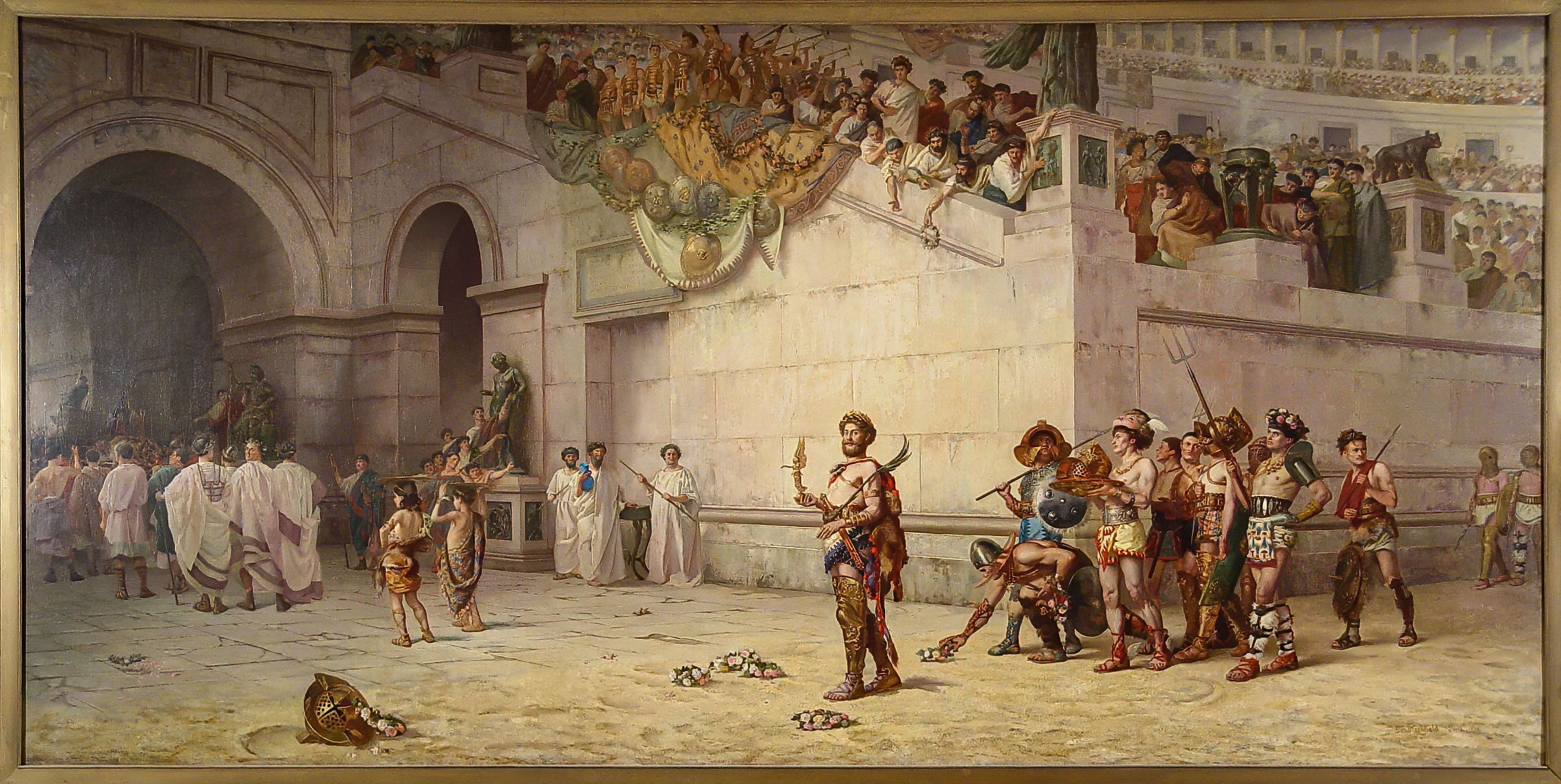
The Roman Emperor Commodus Leaving the Arena at the Head of the Gladiators, 1878

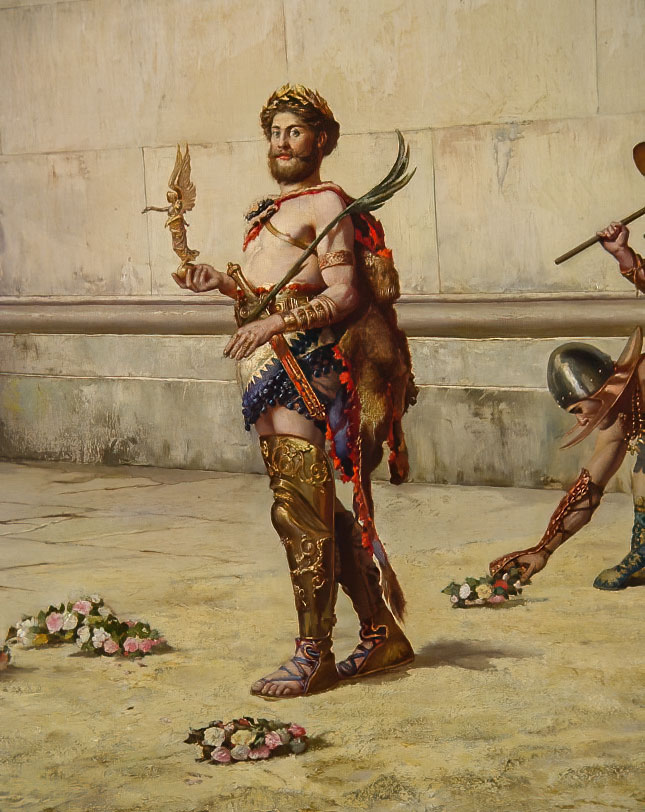
Detail of The Roman Emperor Commodus Leaving the Arena at the Head of the Gladiators

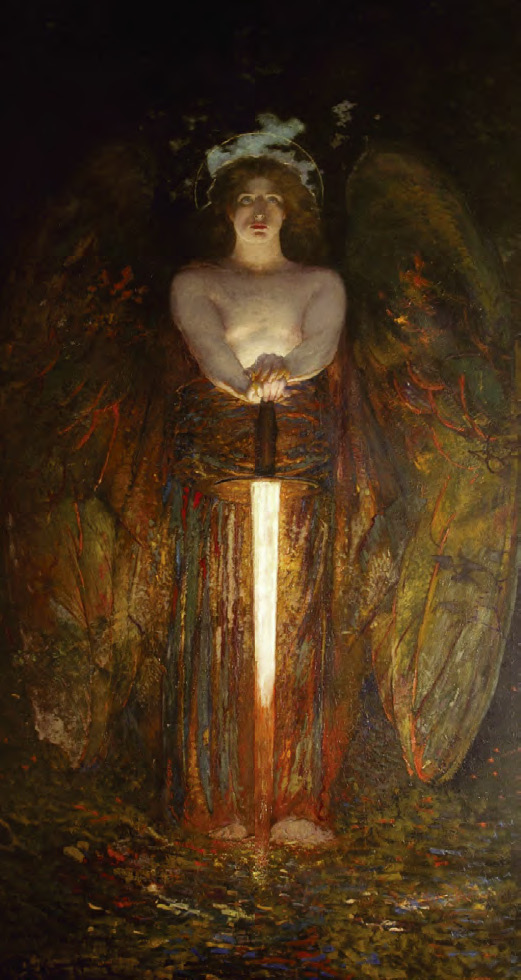
Angel with the Flaming Sword, 1890-1

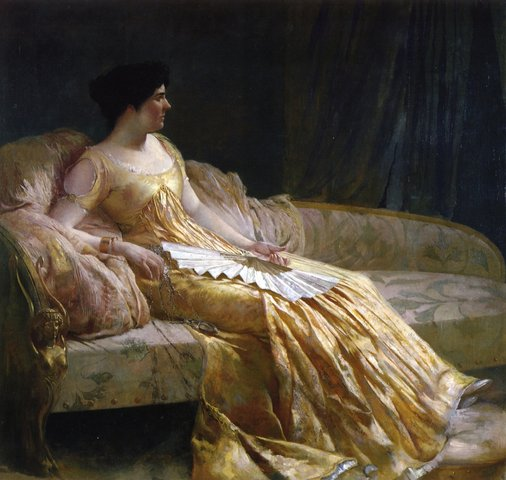
Ellen Day Hale, 1890s

The Graduate, 1908

Detail of The Graduate, depicting Wisdom, Alma Mater, and Discipline

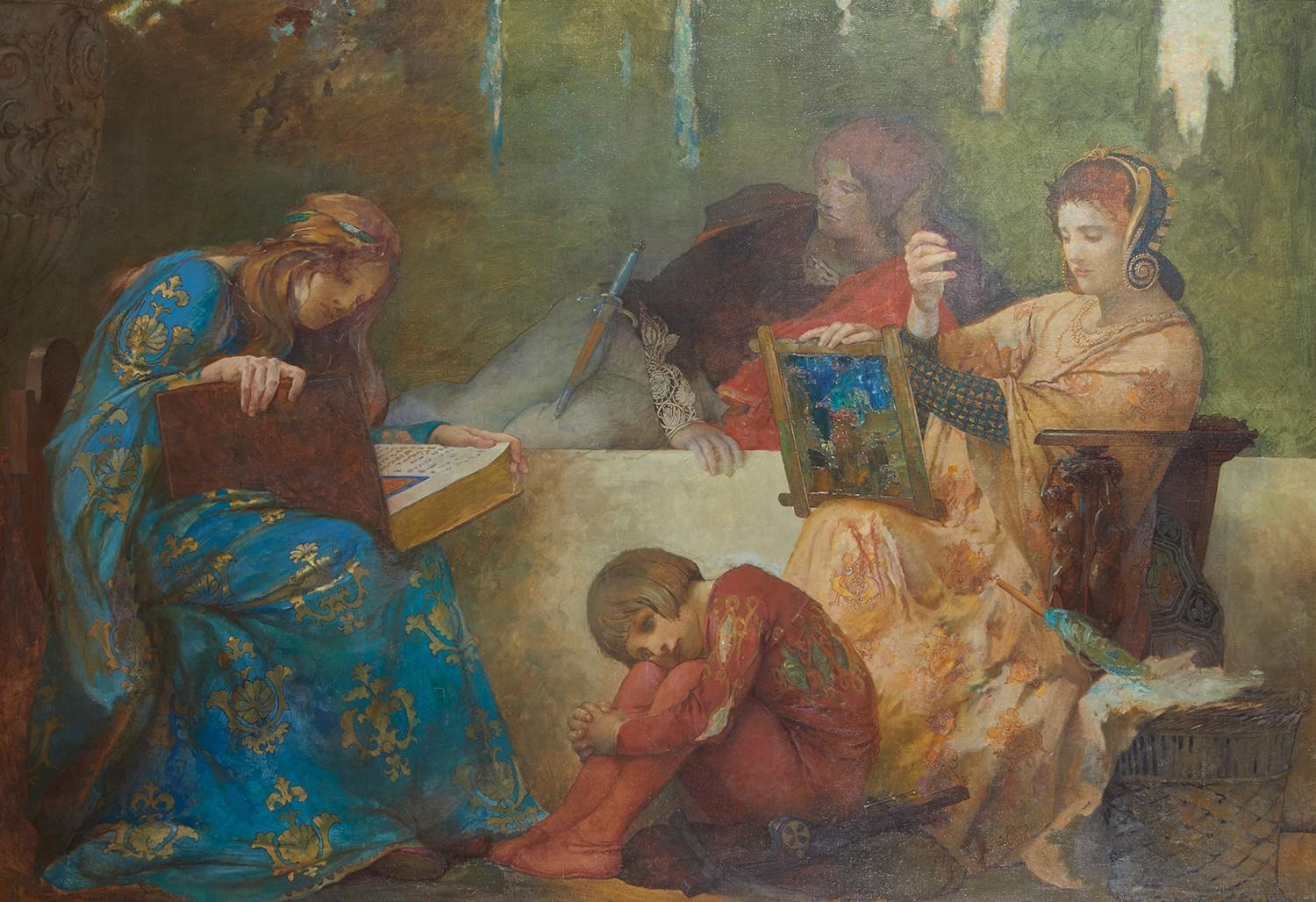
Books, 1914

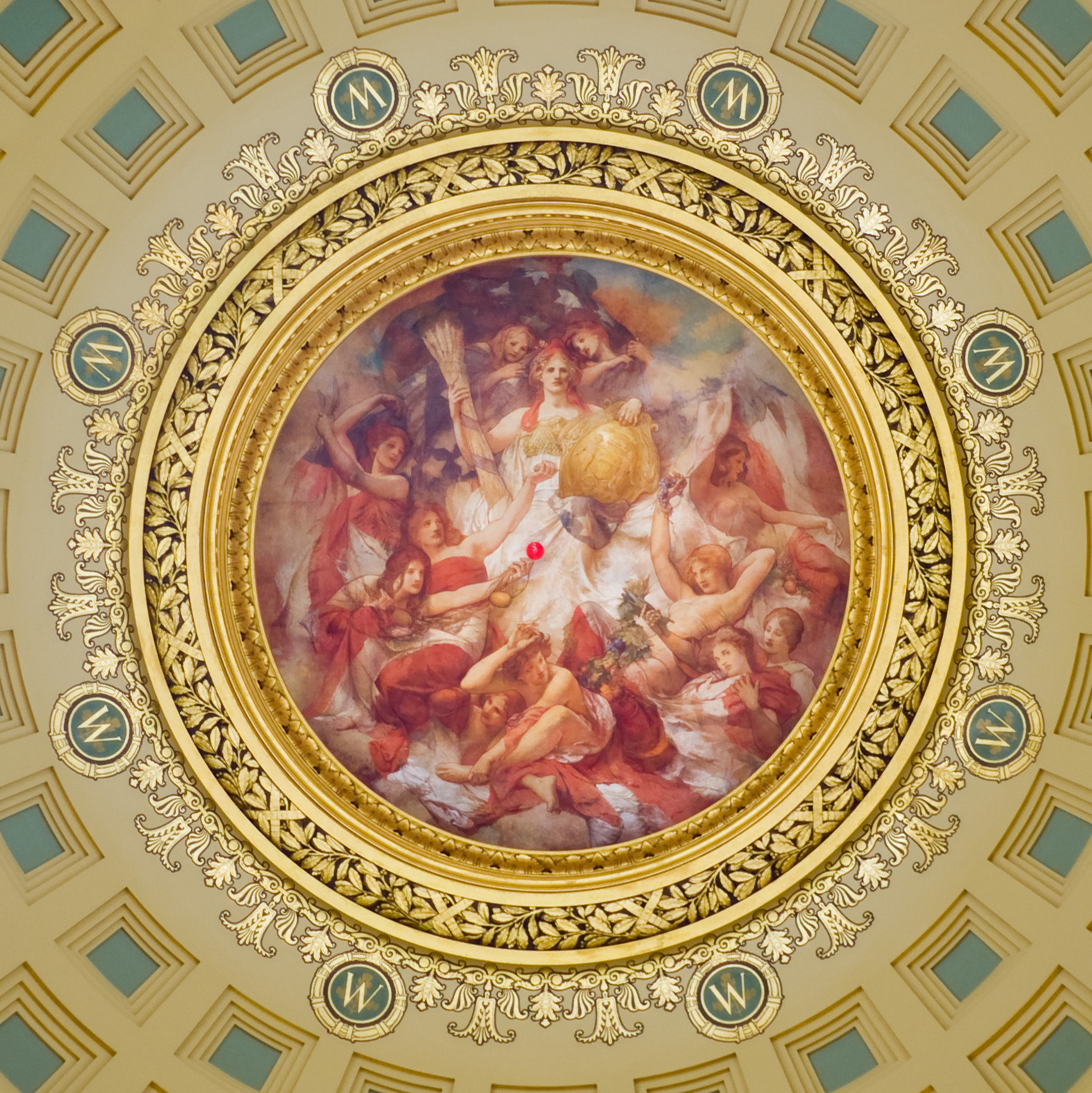
Dome of the Wisconsin State Capitol, 1917

Wisconsin State Assembly chamber mural, 1917

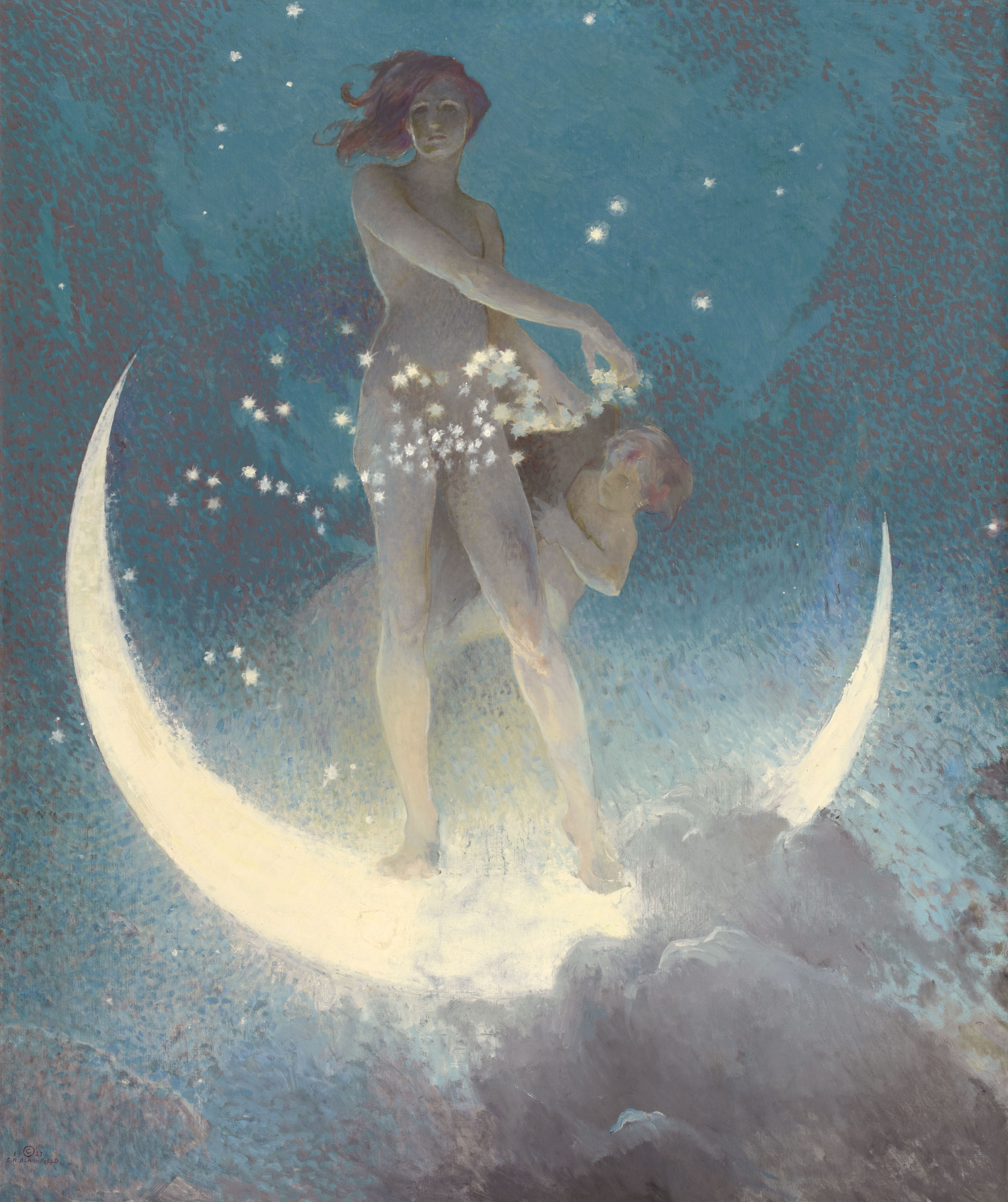
Spring Scattering Stars, 1927

== Selected commissions ==
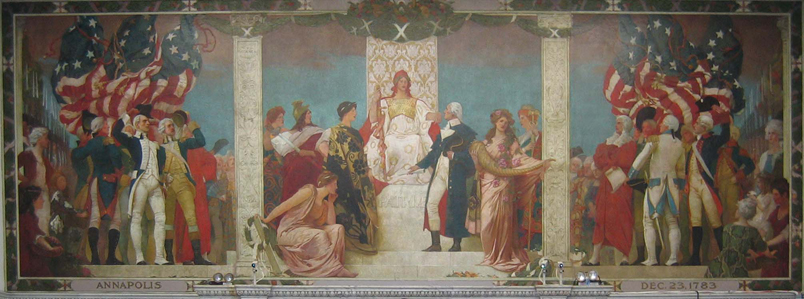
Washington Surrendering His Commission, 1903 mural in the Clarence M. Mitchell Jr. Courthouse, Baltimore

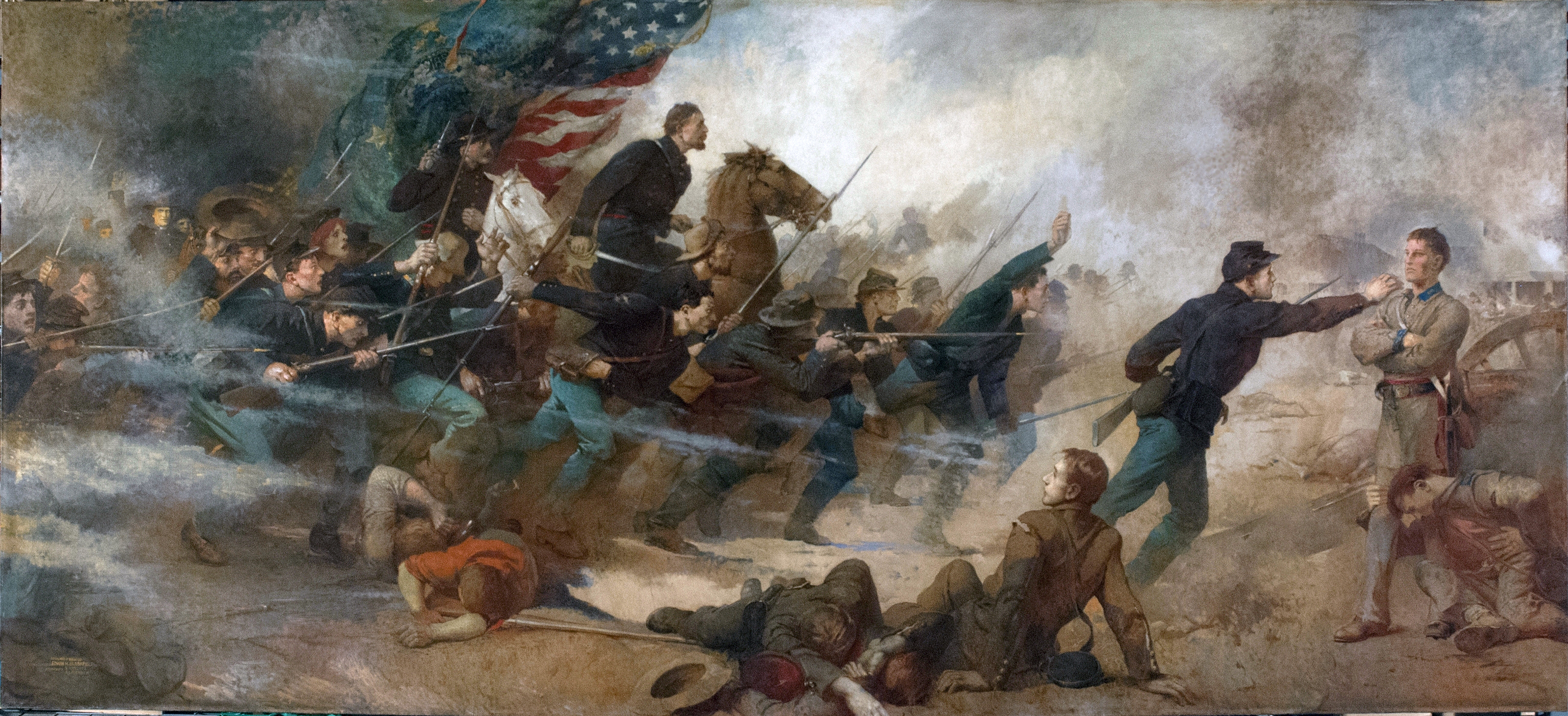
The Fifth Minnesota at Corinth, c. 1912, Governor's Anteroom at the Minnesota State Capitol

- in Atlanta, Georgia
  - a mural of the Good Shepherd St. Luke's Episcopal Church
- in Chicago
  - a dome in the manufacturer's building at the 1893 World Columbian Exposition
  - the Elks National Veterans Memorial
- in Newark, New Jersey
  - Dome of the Historic Court House
- in Washington D.C.
  - the dome of the Main Reading Room of the Thomas Jefferson Building of the Library of Congress
  - the mosaic of Saint Matthew in St. Matthew's Cathedral
- the Iowa State Capitol at Des Moines, Iowa
- the Howard M. Metzenbaum U.S. Courthouse in Cleveland, Ohio
- the Minnesota State Capitol at St. Paul, Minnesota
- the Governor's office in Pierre, South Dakota
- the Wisconsin State Capitol at Madison, Wisconsin
- the Clarence M. Mitchell Jr. Courthouse in Baltimore
- the Mahoning County Court House, Youngstown, Ohio
- the Detroit Public Library
- in New York City
  - Appellate courthouse
  - the grand ballroom of the Waldorf-Astoria Hotel
  - the Lawyers' Club
  - the Great Hall of City College of New York, "The Graduate" mural,
  - the residences of WK Vanderbilt and Collis P. Huntington
  - the National Academy of Design, "Saint Michael".
- in Philadelphia
  - the residence of George W. Drexel (son of Anthony J. Drexel)
  - the chancel dome of the Cathedral Church of the Savior
- the Massachusetts Institute of Technology in Cambridge, Massachusetts. Many paintings by the artist are present, including "North Wall Alma Mater", "South Wall Right Panel Humanity", "North Wall Left Panel Angels in Trees", et al., all painted 1923-1930.
- in Mercersburg Academy, Pennsylvania

== Notes ==
- Gilman, D. C.; Peck, H. T.; Colby, F. M., eds. (1900). "Blashfield, Edwin Howland" . New International Encyclopedia (1st ed.). New York: Dodd, Mead.
- Cortissoz, Royal, introduction, The Works of Edwin Howland Blashfield, Charles Scribner's Sons, New York 1937
- The Works of Edwin Howland Blashfield", Art Inventories Catalog, Smithsonian American Art Museum, The Smithsonian Institution, Washington D.C.
