= Ma Jir Bo =

Chinese painter (1927–1985)

Ma Jir Bo 馬家寶
- Born: 26 August 1927; Haifeng County, Guangdong Province, China
- Died: 8 December 1985 (aged 58); Hong Kong
- Education: Private lessons from Li Tie-fu
- Known for: Painting
- Notable work: The Victoria Harbour, 1974 Just to Survive, 1955 A Medical Doctor, 1971 A Christian Nun, 1966 An Artist Painting his Father, circa 1968 Pok Fu Lam Abattoir, 1973

Ma Jir Bo or Ma Jiabao (Chinese: 馬家寶; pinyin: Mǎ Jiābǎo; 26 August 1927 – 8 December 1985) was a Chinese realism artist and oil painter. Ma is praised for his great portraitures, highly realistic texture-feeling still lifes and memory-rekindling landscapes of Hong Kong all that made him a leading oil painter of his era. Ma is regarded as 'the legacy of Classic Western Masters in the East'. During his career, he created roughly 300 oil paintings, some 50 watercolours, as well as some traditional Chinese ink paintings and Chinese calligraphies.

== Life ==
Ma was born in Haifeng, Guangdong Province. His father Ma Rixin (馬日新) was a charcoal painter. His grandfather was a Scholar ("Wu Xiu-cai") in the Military Division in the Qing dynasty and was decapitated for resisting the National Revolutionary Army. Ma Jir bo's mother was Zhu Yu-zhen. Not long after Ma's birth the family moved to Hong Kong where Ma learned Chinese ink painting with the famous painter Gao Jianfu (1879–1951) at the age of seven. At the age of thirteen he was first introduced to Li Tie-u (1870–1952) and Ma had his important apprenticeship on Western painting with him from 1949 to 1950. During the apprenticeship, both Ma and Li Tiefu lived together in a squatter in Diamond Hill, Kowloon, Hong Kong. As a patriotic artist who sold his paintings to raise fund to support the Nationalist Revolution led by Dr Sun Yat-sen, Li Tiefu parted his patriotic ideology to Ma. By his influence, Ma was a loyal supporter of the Communist Revolution and he adopted Eugène Delacroix's Liberty Leading the People, 1830 to paint Just to Survive, 1955 to describe his approval of the Communist regime. Some of his earlier paintings are highly patriotic and political, such as Xia Jia Bang, 1961 and The Sea of Blood, 1961; as well as having a strong sense of social justice. A Christian Nun, 1966 and A Medical Doctor, 1971 are paintings of a social justice theme.

After Li Tiefu returned to the Mainland in the summer of 1950, Ma moved to Cheung Chau to study the way to paint in different light settings. He lived there for a few years before returning to the Hong Kong Island in 1966. Ma acquired his first student Wong Chung-Man.

In 1964, Ma's hidden life in Cheung Chau was discovered by the editor of the South China Morning Post and the article he wrote attracted the attention of the then Diplomat and Banker of Thailand Chali Yongsunthon, who later became a close supporter of Ma and acquired some of this works and later brought them back to Thailand.

Probably disappointed by the happening of the Cultural Revolution and his abhorrence of violence which occurred both in the Mainland and in Hong Kong, politics and social justice themes were not found in his post 1971 paintings.

Continuously through his life, Ma was dedicated to realism. By hanging An Artist Painting his Father, circa 1968 at the center of his art studio, he intended to remind all his students to refrain from abstractism. Probably influenced by Jean-François Millet, many of his portraits are of peasant farmers (cf. Peasant's Harvest, 1978), workers (cf. Old but Strong, 1963) and of ordinary people in lower social class (A Hooker Smooker's Resting Moment, 1976). "Painting to reflect society" – had been attributed to his style of painting and that he would not paint what the public do not understand. In 1970, Ma married to Madam Tam Wai-Mun, Alice (born 1939) who was one of his art students and had learned paintings from him for over two years before their marriage. They had a son, Lawrence Yan-kwok (born 1970), who has not chosen art as his career but rather to become a barrister in Australia and later in Hong Kong. Ma acquired a number of students in the late 1960s and early 1970s, among them Wong Wen-san (Wang Yun-shan), Yeung Yick (Yang Yi), Chan Yan-fu (Chen Ren-fu) and Chung Yiu (Zhong Yau).

At the same time as Ma's own style matured in the 1970s, his health started to deteriorate. Suffering from a lung disease, he was always short of breath and was difficult to manoeuvre. Hiking up the Peak and so as to paint the entire Victoria Harbour in 1974 was most notable as it is now part of the lost scenery of the rapidly developing Hong Kong to rekindle the public's collective memory.

In 1977, Ma was selected as the represent the Hong Kong art community representative to attend the prestigious National Day celebration in Beijing on 1 October. Before that, Ma was commissioned to paint two large portraits: one of Chairman Mao Zedong and another of Chairman Hua Guofeng by the then Director of Xinhua News Agency in Hong Kong. At the National Day celebration, he was welcomed and greeted by Ye Jianying and Liao Chengzhi. The two portraits were hand-delivered by Ma to the Director in September 1977 and were displayed next to the national flag at the National Day celebration. They were never seen after 1977 and the whereabouts of the two portraits is a mystery now.

In the 1980s, his health further deteriorated and aggravated by the presence of kidney stones. Ma did not paint much and there were only two oil paintings produced in 1985. He died in the Queen Mary Hospital on December 8, 1985, aged 58, from the combination of his long ailing lung illness together with complication from a laser kidney stone surgery. He was survived by this mother, his wife and son.

Ma's attitude to life: Death is most frightening but even more frightening than death itself is the lack of great contribution to the human race. 死是最可怕的事但於人類不能作出偉大的貢獻那比死還更可怕 (Spring, 1975)

On 7 December 1985, a day before his death, he wrote in his diary: Painting is my lifelong devotion. I am not afraid of death as [death] is a natural course of things ... [You students] have to paint more frequently, don't be sad, I feel absolutely comfortable, because I have made myself a patriotic artist, translated from 畫是我的生命. 我不怕死，這是自然的規律 ...已後多寫畫，不要悲傷,我覺得完全舒服,因為我做了一個愛國畫家.

== Works ==
Slive once categorised Ma as a classic western artist - [E]arly in his career he acquired skill painting the subjects and working in the traditional style employed by a number of western artists, and from the beginning he had a fine sense of colour. It also appears that once he found his style and subjects that interested him he remained dedicated to them. He seems to have had no interest in experimenting or adopting any of the different approaches to painting used by innovative artists of his time. Certainly not 'innovative' enough to paint incomprehensible works that no public could understand, in his writing to remind himself, Ma offered the only surviving explanation on why he had such a strong hold on realism and abhorred the rise of abstractism because: An artist should deploy his paint brushes to benefit his country and his race and the whole world; and should not hold himself out as an artist if he paints "strange" [abstract and incomprehensible] paintings, translated from 畫家應該把畫筆去造福國家民族及全世界人類切不可做寫怪畫的空頭藝術家.

Art Critic Ian Finlay reckons that Ma Jir Bo's Western influences and inspirations are clearly evident - from Rembrandt and Constable to John Singer Sargent and Li Tie-fu, as well as realism, expressionism and socialist realism. Regardless of these influences, Ma retained his unique mark and lyrical colours.

=== Portraits ===
Portraits are natural reflection of real people. The ability to achieve a true likeness was greatly valued until the mid-nineteenth century. However, once photographs became common, artists could use their skills to show something about the subject that no camera could match. In addition to showing the person, a great portrait suggests a history, personality, mood and feeling. Leonardo da Vinci's Mona Lisa, 1507 captures the essence of the portrait in that it is compelling, and the view feels a connection to the person who is portrayed, yet it is also mysterious.

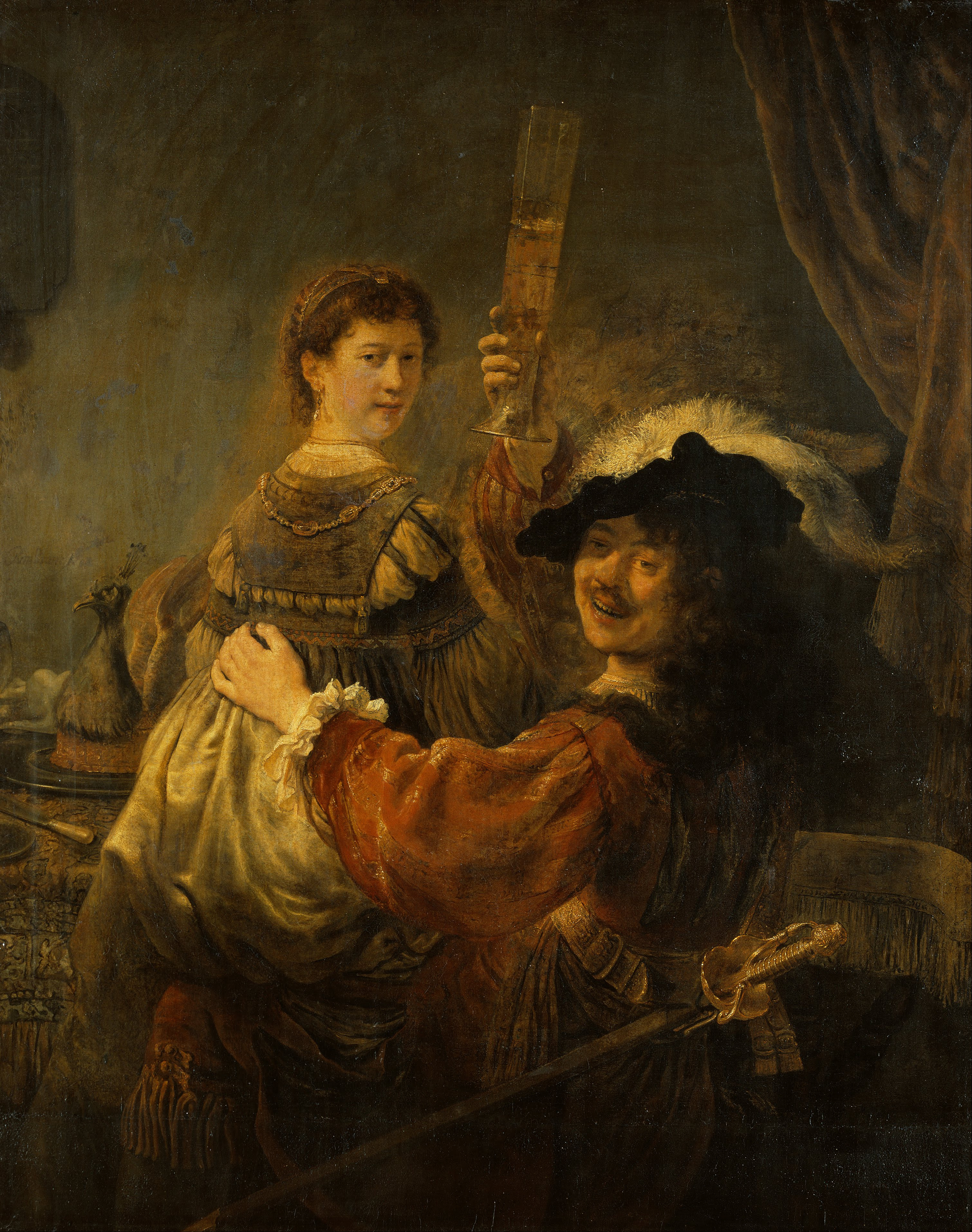
Rembrandt 《Self-portrait with Saskia》 (1635)

==== Self-Portraits ====
For the viewer, self-portraits provide insight into the personality and possibly information about the situation which the artist was then in, that is, the inner life of the artist.

Unlike Rembrandt, Ma did not have his students copied his own self-portraits as part of their training; so there are a certain number of self-portraits – eight of them. His earliest one was in 1964 and the last one in 1983, two years before his death. His first self-portrait as a young but mature man was painted before he was interviewed by the press and seized this opportunity he wished to make known to the world that he was a Western artist who loved a peaceful world. The Self Portrait (in Celebration), 1966 draws substantial resemblance with Rembrandt's Self-portrait with Saskia (or The Prodigal Son with A Whore), 1635.

By 1636, Rembrandt had a successful venture in the Amsterdam's portraiture market and he had received commissions from the court in The Hague, set up an active studio, married burgomaster's daughter and moved into a prestigious home. By that time, Rembrandt had arisen up the social hierarchy and had various success in life. In 1636, he successfully sued Saskia's relatives for denying her part of her father's estate. In this Self-portrait with Saskia, both the artist and his wife appear to flaunt a proto-bohemian lifestyle, displaying their conspicuous and lavish consumption. His swaggering attitude and fanciful costume were seen as Rembrandt showing off his wealth and youthful bride. The blackboard on the wall, used to chalk up drinks, and the peacock pie alluding to costly pride were traditional elements in pictures of the Prodigal Son squandering his inheritance.

Similar degree of extravagance is found in Ma's Self Portrait (in Celebration), 1966. Giant tiger prawns, in those days, are up-market expensive seafood more commonly found in banquets and were not even served in middle-class family meals. The wearing of a pair of leader glove also shows off Ma's wealth where in the 60s leader products are luxuries. As compared with his other portraits, where clothes were worn plain, Ma's wearing of a proper white collar shirt, a green silk tie inside a red cardigan with a posh brass zips, together with a matching green overcoat and a freshly knitted stylish cashmere scarf would probably be the most expensive apparels that the artist could have mustered in those days. The orange wine was an imported one which was sold at exorbitant prices. The hand holding the wine glass is similar to that of Rembrandt but in reserve. The smile on Ma's face, together with a pair of healthy red lips, a shining forehead, indicative of a robust and strong state of health. His pair of eyes was full of hope and contemplation for a prosperous future. Rembrandt's drunken eyes and with a whore sitting on his lap, subtly, the picture has been interpreted as Rembrandt's admission that he shares the original sin of all human beings – greed and lust. Ma did not see living comfortably and to enjoy good food was a sin. At that time, Ma had met a well off admirer who was then the general manager of the Bangkok Bank in Hong Kong who supported him and later required some of his paintings. By then, Ma was confident on his chosen career path as a professional artist as it had now provided him with a good source of income.

The two paintings have striking similarities:-

Gesture and expression. The triumphant holding up of a wine glass by Rembrandt compared with a humble and reserved holding out of the same wine glass by Ma; both convey a different degree of joy and lavishness. Ma just had his taste of success (measured by financial reward) in his career whereas Rembrandt had always been well paid for his portraiture work since he was young, and that Rembrandt disgust himself as the squandering Prodigal Son; the sense of extravagance and lavishness in Self Portrait with Saskia is stronger than that of Self Portrait (in Celebration). The swaggering attitude of Rembrandt holding his wife Saskia who sat on his lap as if she was a whore (a woman on a drunken man's lap was identified as a whore in the seventeenth-century) contrasted sharply with the righteous Ma who sat straight up directly facing the viewer. This aptly reflects their different attitude towards financial success. Ma was holding back from any ‘over-joy’ that might led into misfortune if he did not cautiously manage his affairs. Thus, the Ma had a satisfying smile whereas Rembrandt an unreserved laugh.

Message conveyed. The eyes provide the primary focus in any portrait, helping to define the relationship between the model and the viewer. Ma looked straight at the viewer and Rembrandt was looking downwards to the left of the painting and could only see the viewer from his peripheral vision. Ma was enjoying his wine but he was not drunk unlike Rembrandt.

Costume and Decoration. Both figures were dressed lavishly. Rembrandt displayed a peacock pie which alluded to his pride and items of wealth and extravagance. Ma's entree, a plate of giant tiger prawns was extravagant and showcasing an affluent lifestyle.

Many who have seen Ma's portraits and that of Rembrandt's could draw numerous stylistic resemblance and not surprisingly they nicknamed him 'Oriental' Rembrandt.

=== Domestic Life ===
Courbet L'Atelier du peintre 《The Painter's Studio》 (1855)

Diego Velázquez 《Las Meninas》 (1656)

Hitherto the painting of everyday subjects became commonplace in the 17th century, many artists included the interiors of houses as a setting, rather than a subject, for their work. A room could provide an insight into the status, as well as the interests and personality, of the owner. Ma's impecuniosities in the heavily populated Hong Kong meant he had to live in a tiny squatter and to paint in this home-studio. The most notable Diego Velázquez's Las Meninas, 1656 has influenced Gustave Courbet’s The Artist's Studio (L'Atelier du peintre): A Real Allegory of a Seven Year Phase in my Artistic and Moral Life, 1855; which influenced Ma’s Artist's Studio, 1964.

=== Civil Allegory work ===
Liberty Leading the People, 1830, Eugène Delacroix (1798–1863)

Allegory is used to highlight the role of civic institutions and commemorate national events. Civic allegories were frequently commissioned by the state to underline the moral significance of major events. Eugène Delacroix's picture was an important state commission to commemorate the July Revolution of 1830 when Emperor Clarles X was ousted from power. A woman personifying Liberty leads the people forward over the bodies of the fallen, holding the tricolore flag of the French Revolution in one hand and brandishing a bayonetted musket with the other. The mound of corpses acts as a kind of pedestal from which Liberty strides, barefoot and bare-breasted, out of the canvas and into the space of the viewer. Delacroix painted his work in the autumn of 1830. In the rhetoric and in reality, the 1830 Revolution mirrored the 1789 French Revolution: the poor rebelled against the monarchy, the aristocracy and the priests. In that era, there was largely an urban uprising against dreadful labour conditions and that fostered a voice and organization for the working class to air their complaints and effect change thereafter. Delacroix was influenced and had his focus on the poor. In a letter to his brother dated 12 October, he wrote: "My bad mood is vanishing thanks to hard work. I’ve embarked on a modern subject—a barricade. And if I haven’t fought for my country at least I’ll paint for her." Critics found the personification of Liberty far too realistic. Liberty, personified by Marianne, symbol of the nation, as both an allegorical goddess-figure and a robust woman of the people, an approach that contemporary critics denounced as "ignoble". Politicians regarded the dramatic painting as highly politically provocative. For this reason the French government quietly removed it from public view. It inspired the Statue of Liberty in New York City, which was given to the United States as a gift from the French only 50 years after "Liberty Leading the People" had been painted. The statue, which holds a torch in its hand, takes a stance similar to that of the woman in the painting.

Ma captioned at the back of the original painting to say "[I]n 1944, there was a strong and established pleasant revolutionary infantry in the Haifeng County. [This painting depicts] the infantry ambushed a proletarian landlord led forces which was set out to extract rent from pleasant. (this painting was completed in 1955).’

The two paintings have striking similarities:-

Social class of constituents. In Liberty Leading the People, the fighters are from a mixture of social classes, ranging from the upper classes represented by the young man in a top hat, to the revolutionary middle class or (bourgeoisie), as exemplified by the boy holding pistols. They were geared up to revolt against the repressive sovereign so people from all walks of life were gathered. Whereas in Just to Survive, the fighters are from a similar or identical social class, that is proletarians or pleasant farmers, as identified by the same kind of costume they wear. The single objective which was to overthrown the oppressive bourgeoisies landlords who had been exploiting them. Communism is a ‘class struggle’ movement. The exploited lower class is up against the upper privileged class and to eliminate them so as to reach a total proletarian rule.

Message conveyed. The eyes provide the primary focus in any portrait, helping to define the relationship between the model and the viewer. In both Liberty Leading the People and Just to Survive, what they have in common is the fierceness and determination in their eyes. If fierceness of the eyes is a determining feature that gives spirit to characters, probably, Ma's depiction of eyes conveys a stronger message than that of Delacroix.

The Marching Direction. Liberty is marching forward from the background towards the viewer leading the boy on her right and the top hat man from her left; whereas the naked pleasant soldier is marching to the right of the painting. The positioning of the boy on the left instead of on the right of the peasant soldier carries a deeper meaning – the gradual penetration and taking over by the ‘leftist’ communism against the ‘rightist’ fascism.

=== Social Protest Works ===
By the 19th century, social protest became a strong element in the work of many artists in Europe. Increasingly independent from wealthy patrons, state commissions and the church, artists were able to choose their own subjects. Ma's Hong Kong was in an era of great social upheaval - political revolution, the influx of Mainland immigrants and the beginning of industrialization. Ma used his work to express his outrage at the oppression of the poor, be they farm workers, miners, or factory labourers.

=== Politics ===
Politicians and rules have traditionally been aware of the way art could serve them. Throughout history, great statesmen and women, kings and queens, powerful family dynasties, and manipulative courtiers have used art to promote themselves and their cause, to celebrate their achievements, and to try to ensure public esteem. One of the examples in China is the Portrait of Chairman Mao Ze-dong hanged on the Tiananmen Gate.

Commissioned by the then Director of Xinhua News Agency, Liang Wei-lin, Ma painted two portraits of Chairman Mao Zedong and Chairman Hua Guofeng in August and in September 1977. Measuring at approximately 2m by 1.5m, these portraits are probably the largest portraits that Ma had ever painted. After Ma hand-delivered the two portraits to Liang on 23 September 1977 to his office, the two portraits were believed to have been shown at National Day Celebration in Hong Kong and were never seen thereafter.

=== War ===
Since ancient times, the portrayal of war became an occasion for the triumphant celebration of courageous conquests, showing the achievements in victory of a nation, ruler or commander. Instead of commemorating victories, war also brings about the brutality of conflict and violence. For example, Francisco de Goya's painting of The Third of May, 1808 in Madrid: The Executions on the Principe Pio Hill, 1814 and Ma's The Sea of Blood, 1961 are works that artists use their work to express their personal concerns and moral outrage. In these paintings, war is no longer about heroism and glory, but about murder and torture. Japan invaded China from 1937 to 1945 which is historically known as the Second Sino-Japanese war. The estimated civilian casualties: due to military activity, killed 1,073,496 and 237,319 wounded; 335,934 killed and 426,249 wounded in Japanese air attacks. Goya focused on the individual in white to make the suffering seem more personal, in contrast to the faceless and anonymous row of executioners. The man holds out his arms, in a pose that is deliberately reminiscent of the crucified Christ. His size underlines his importance. Ma chose to focus both on the executioner in Japanese army uniform holding up his bayonet and the naked woman with one of her nipples cut off. There was a crowd of people lining up that would be forthcoming to the viewer and would be executed in the same manner.

Francisco de Goya 《The Third of May》 (1814)

=== Landscape ===
==== Water ====
Water is as changeable and complex as life itself. Artists observe it in all its moods, from raging storms to tranquil lakes and streams. The sea can be peaceful or provocative and Ma's Fishing in a Rainstorm, 1964 was his vivid portrait of movement of wave. Ma was believed to have stood by at the seaside amid a rainstorm brought about by a life-threatening typhoon in Hong Kong.

==== Rural Life ====
Through the centuries, artists, and in particular northern European artists, returned again and again to the subject of the life of farm workers and villagers as a rich source of inspiration. In the eighteenth century, when the pastoral ideal was prevalent in landscape art, rural life was transformed into a sanitized, picturesque ideal. For example, in France, Gustave Courbet and Jean-François Millet shocked the urban public with their powerful paintings of poverty and backbreaking work in the fields. Farms are rare found in the commercial city Hong Kong and Ma had ventured out to Pao On County, Shenzhen, to a large paddy field and painted the harvest.

==== Cityscapes ====
Artists should only attempt to paint the city views until he has developed a perspective of the entire city to make it possible to show a sweeping cityscape. Usually, an artist paints a public recognizable icon that represents the city for such a sweeping cityscape. Gerrit Berckheyde (1638–1698)'s Great Market in Haarlem, 1696 and Fyodor Alekseyev (1753–1824)'s Red Square in Moscow, 1801 and Ma's The Victoria Harbour, 1974 are works that depict the most readily identifiable scene of a particular city and viewers could immediately associate the painting with that city.

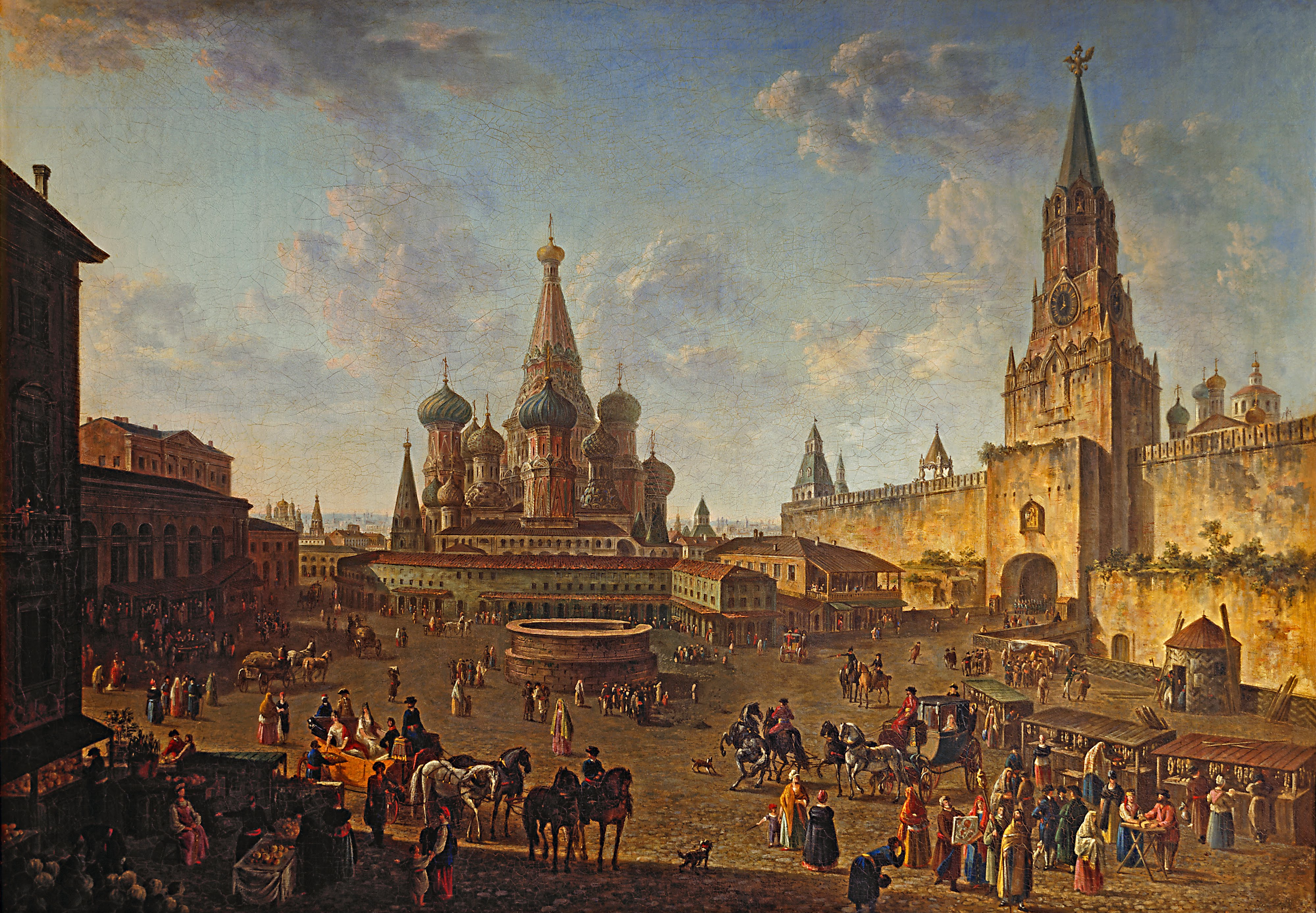
Fedor Alekseyev《Красная площадь в Москве》 (1801)

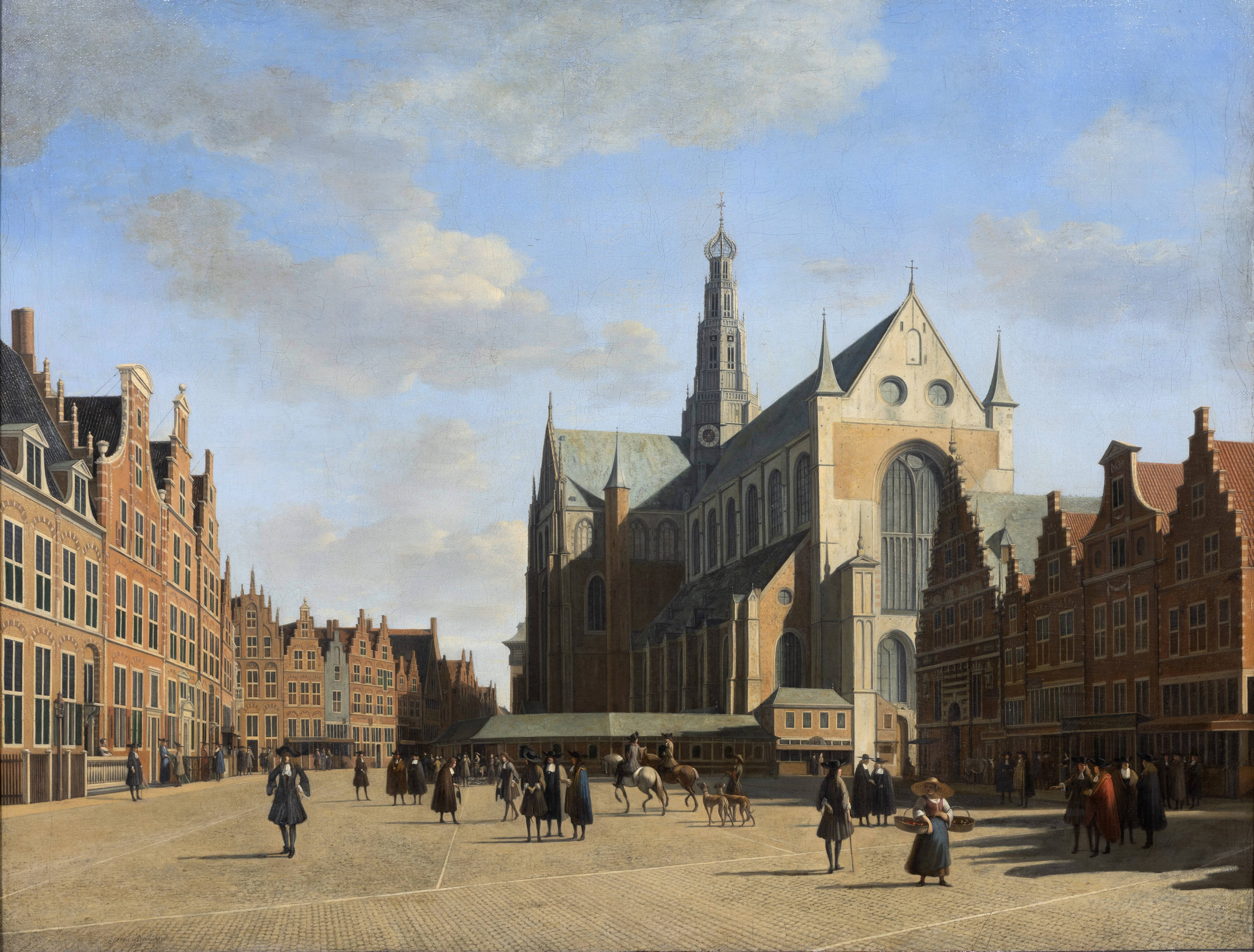
Berkheyde 《Haarlem》 (1696)

==== Urban Life ====
Every weekend in the 70s, Ma took his family and students to various places in the city to search for suitable scenery worthwhile to be painted. Through hard works, Ma created a great number of the city's urban life painting. "Like a sort of 20th century Cantonese Constable, Ma infused Hong Kong's rugged coasts and lush uplands with a sense of rustic romance — all the more surreal when you consider that at the peak of his career Hong Kong was no sun-dappled idyll of lusty rice farmers and blushing flower girls. It was a tough entrepôt and factory town, wrapped in a pall of soot, struggle and heartache," wrote Jing Zhang in the Time Magazine. Echoed by his son, "[t]he artist captures the spirit of his era in his paintings. My father was such an artist. His legacy of paintings of the streets and alleys and scenes of Hong Kong bears witness to, and provides coming generations with an invaluable insight into, the spirit of that era. He once said, 'Painting is a silent art; silent as a poem, it expresses the innermost feelings and sub-consciousness of the artist."

Of course, the Hong Kong Museum of Art was aware of the existence of this Hong Kong John Constable and made a posthumous acquisition of Ma's Street Scene in Cheung Chau, 1978.

=== Still life ===
The Romans produced decorative still lifes in murals and mosaics to adorn their homes, while in China there was a long tradition from early times of painting flowers with birds, culminating in the elegant depictions of bamboo and plum flowers, created by the painters of the Yuan dynasty in the 13th and the 14th centuries. Flowers, particularly, were used for decorative or symbolic purposes. The lily, for example, was a traditional attribute of the Virgin, symbolizing her purity, and was invariably included in pictures of the Annunciation. In the East, the chrysanthemum is one of the "Four Gentlemen" (四君子) of China (the others being the plum blossom, the orchid, and bamboo). The chrysanthemum is said to have been favored by Tao Qian, an influential Chinese poet, and is symbolic of nobleness. It is also one of the 4 symbolic seasonal flowers. Chrysanthemums are the topic in hundreds of poems of China.

Artists have become synonymous with individual flowers: the most obvious example is Vincent van Gogh's Sunflowers. Van Gogh, albeit a post-impressionist, was a realist when painting the sunflowers. ‘He painted the sunflowers exactly as he saw them, even if the heads were wilting or dead’. Ma's Chrysanthemums painted the flowers’ full bloom to reflect his approval of the spirit of the flower – to be Gentlemen-like and would not bow to power or subdued by means.

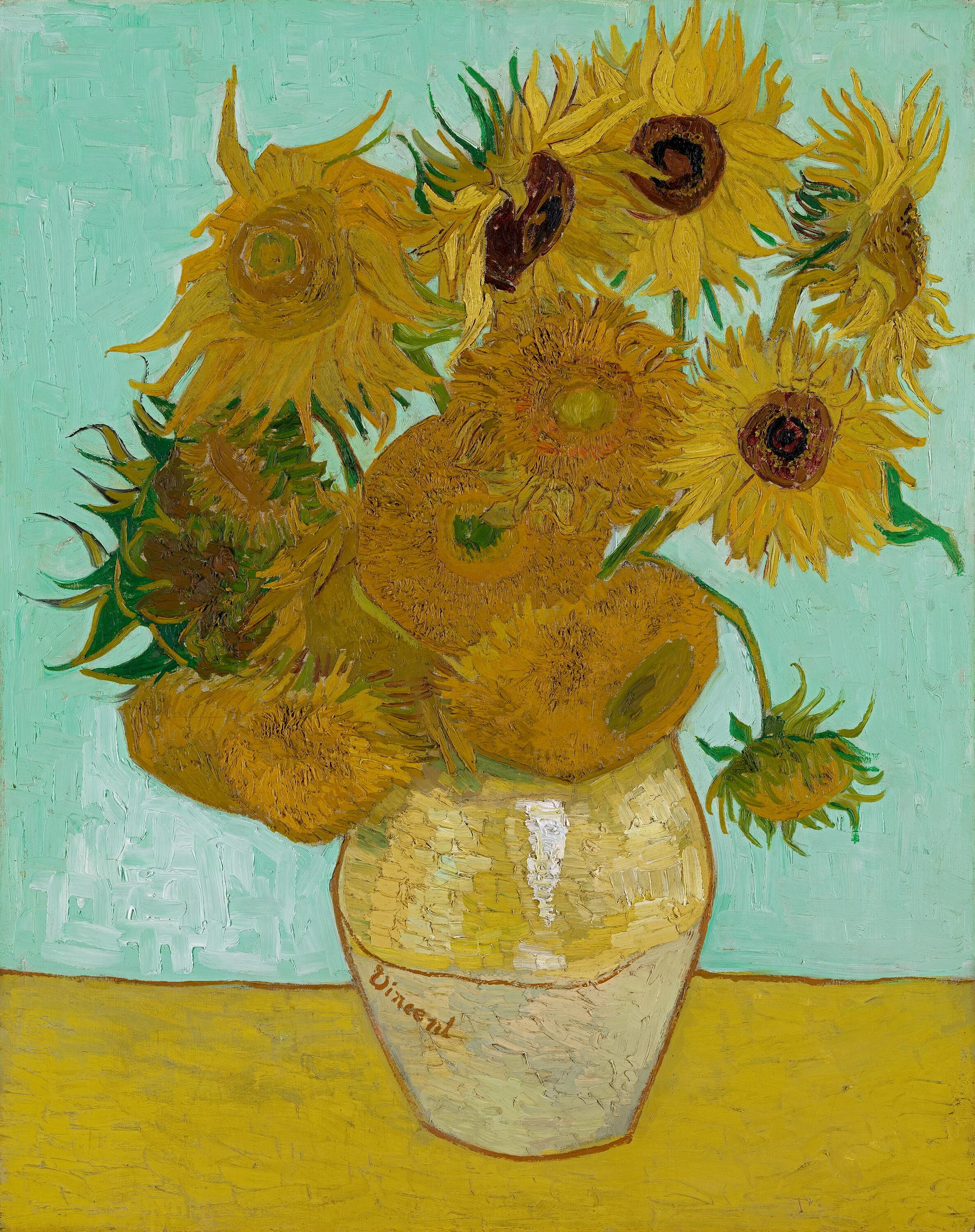
Vincent Willem van Gogh《Sunflower》 (1888)

Nearly all still lifes include – to a greater or lesser extent – the aspect of vanitas, a lament about the transience of all things. It is often symbolized by object such as a skull or a clock. Most notably is Pieter Claesz's Vanitas Still Life, 1630 of an overturned wine glass and an extinguished candle. Claesz's metaphysical criticism concentrates on book knowledge and its futility in the face of eternity. Books contain knowledge, experience and thoughts that were permanently valid beyond the life-span of an individual and are ever enlightening. Inculcated with Confucius teachings from the well-known Confucian Four Books and Five Classics (四書五經), Ma was of a traditional and conservative breed and he agreed with the teaching of a classic poem that encouraged people to study. Ma showed his dedicated support of continuous learning through studying in his Past Knowledge - present Usage, 1966. Ma once wrote: I love to study history, not because I like old things, but because I can benefit from lessons learned translated from 我愛讀歷史書，不是好古，而是為了今用.

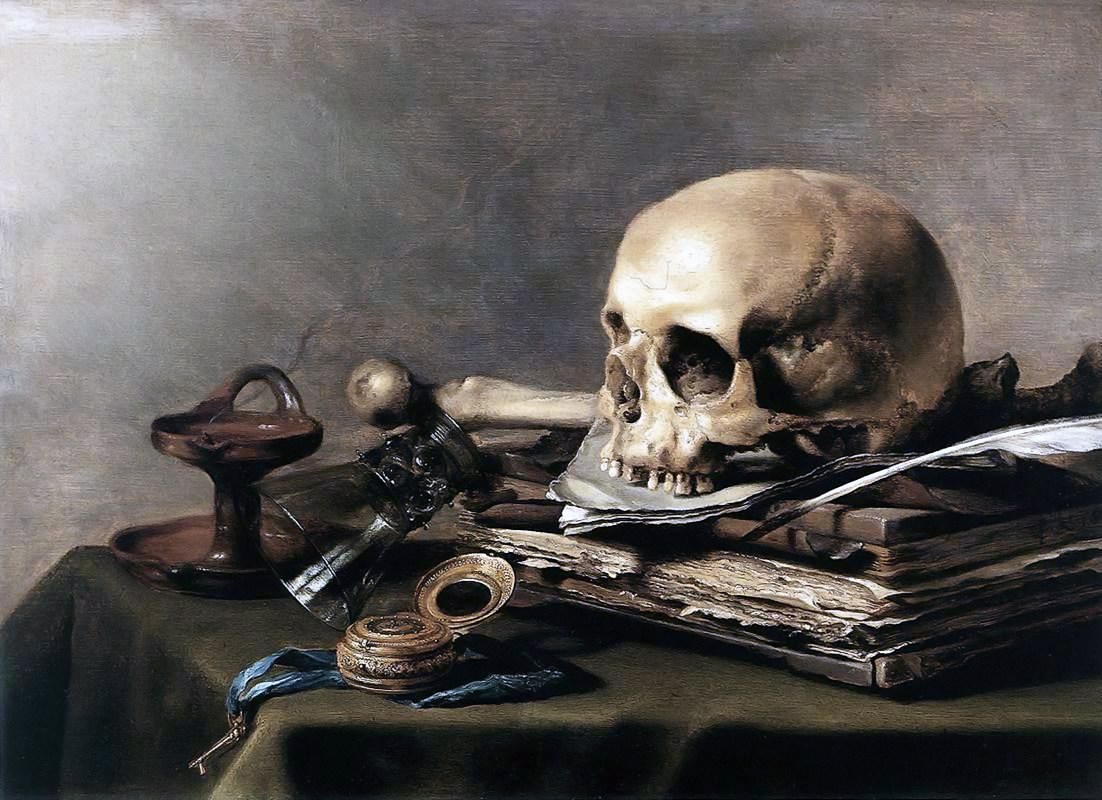
Pieter Claesz 《Vanitas Still Life》（1630）

== Museum Collection ==
In 1977, possibly commissioned by the then Guangzhou Lu Xun Memorial Gallery, Ma painted a set of eight portraits of Lu Xun - a leftist writer who was highly acclaimed by Chairman Mao – about him visiting Hong Kong. In July 1981, this set of eight portraits were donated to the then Guangzhou Lu Xun Memorial Gallery which has now part of the Guangdong Provincial Museum.

In 1987, the Hong Kong Museum of Art acquired two of Ma's paintings: Artist's Studio, 1964 (shown above) and Street Scene in Cheung Chau, 1978 (shown above).
