= Self-Portrait in Tuxedo =

1927 painting by Max Beckmann

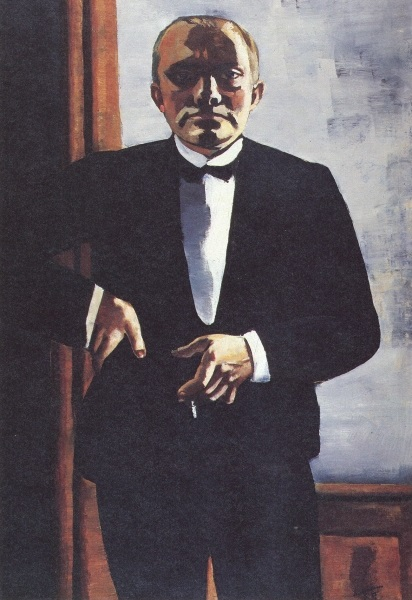
- Artist: Max Beckmann
- Year: 1927
- Medium: Oil on canvas
- Dimensions: 139,5 cm × 95,5 cm (549 in × 376 in)
- Location: Busch-Reisinger Museum, Harvard University Art Museum, Cambridge

Self-Portrait in Tuxedo is an oil-on-canvas painting executed in 1927 by the German artist Max Beckmann. It now hangs in the Busch-Reisinger Museum of the Harvard University Art Museum, in Cambridge, Massachusetts.

== Description ==
The self-portrait shows Max Beckmann standing with his body facing the viewer in a direct, frontal pose. He wears a tuxedo typical of the 1920s fashion and holds a cigarette in his left hand at stomach level, while he puts his right hand on his hip. In this rather casual posture and with a sober look, he stands in front of a dirty white wall. In the left half of the picture viewers can see an empty door frame, and in the lower half of the picture a wooden wall paneling. Despite the use of the white color, the picture looks rather dark.

Stephan Lackner described it in these terms: "Symmetry here becomes a symbol of security. The face is partitioned into symmetrical patches of light and shadow. Every feature rests in itself. Reliability is shown in the perfect equilibrium; the stance is reminiscent of the classical contrapposto of heroic statues. The closed contour proclaims a self-contained human being. The man's left hand is moved over to the middle of the picture; thus, both well-lighted hands together form a counterpoise against the background, which is dark on the left and light on the right-a delicate balancing act. Everything is quietly clarified, distilled into a rational formula. The undiluted contrast of black, white, and brown gives a feeling of clean stylization."

== Critical reception ==
The initial critical reception to the portrait was mixed. Critic Fritz Stahl, writing in 1928, expressed his disgust: "A Caesarean mask, frowning forehead, tyrant's stare, every inch the great man. These faces have to disappear again from our world if humanism is to be reconstituted." Heinrich Simon, the publisher of the newspaper Frankfurter Zeitung, wrote in 1930 in his praise: "that this lonely maverick may become the only personality in European painting who, by his example, will form a style for the future." Peter Selz in 1964 named it "one of the great self-portraits in the history of art.

Art historian Joseph Koerner said of the painting: "It’s iconic of the artistic movement called Expressionism. And it has become iconic of the Weimar Republic, and therefore of a decisive era in the history of Germany and of the Europe centered on, and unsettled by, Weimar Germany."
