= David Budd =

American abstract painter

David Budd (March 31, 1927 – October 8, 1991) was an American painter.

== Early life and education ==
David Wilson Budd Jr. was born on March 31, 1927, in St. Petersburg, Florida. He graduated from St. Petersburg High School, then enrolled at the University of Florida to study architecture. He soon dropped out to study interior design at the Ringling School of Art and Design. He later shifted his focus to painting after watching a film about Jackson Pollock.

He worked for the Christiani Brothers Circus, eventually marrying the equestrian ballerina Corcaita (Corky) Christiani.

== Career ==
Budd and his wife moved to New York City in the 1950s. He became a member of the Abstract Expressionist movement. He moved to Paris in the 1960s, to work with the Galerie Stadler, and returned to the United States in 1968.

He was friends with the writer William S. Burroughs. His first solo show was at the American University in Washington, D.C. in 1956. His next two were at the Betty Parsons Gallery in New York in 1958 and 1960. He won a Guggenheim Fellowship, a National Endowment for the Arts grant and a Peggy Guggenheim Award.

Budd taught Fine Arts at the School of Visual Arts in NYC from 1973 to 1986.

=== Work held in collections ===
His paintings are held in a variety of permanent collections, including:

- The Blanton Museum of Art
- The Corcoran Gallery of Art
- The Metropolitan Museum of Art
- National Gallery of Australia
- The Museum of Modern Art
- The Solomon R. Guggenheim Museum
- The University of Michigan Museum of Art
- The Whitney Museum of American Art

== Later life ==
Budd died on October 8, 1991, at the age of 64, after a long illness followed by heart failure, at his home in Sarasota, Florida.
