= Olle Zetterquist =

Swedish artist and violinist (1927–2024)

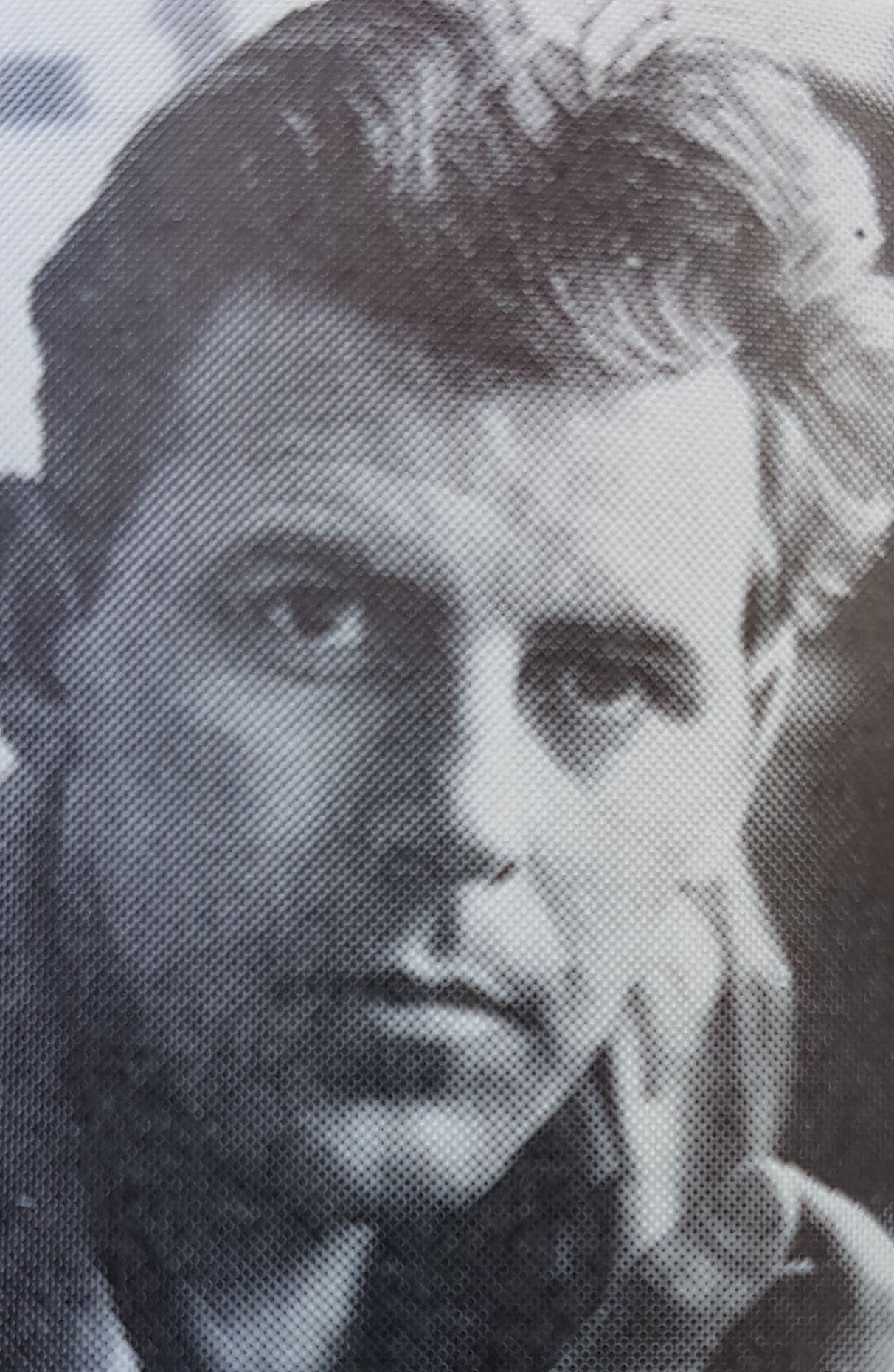

Olle Zetterquist (15 January 1927 – 20 September 2024) was a Swedish artist and violinist. He was educated at the Valand Academy and became established in the Swedish artworld in the 1950s. He had often collaborated with his brother Jörgen Zetterquist, also an artist and musician. His works stretch from abstract organic painting to naturalism, with a focus on composition and colour values. Many of his subjects are from the nature around Arvika, where he is from. He was married to the artist Denice Zetterquist. Their daughter Nina Zetterquist is a textile artist. Zetterquist died on 20 September 2024, at the age of 97.
