= Eva Fuka =

Czech-American photographer (1927–2015)

Eva Fuka-Engle
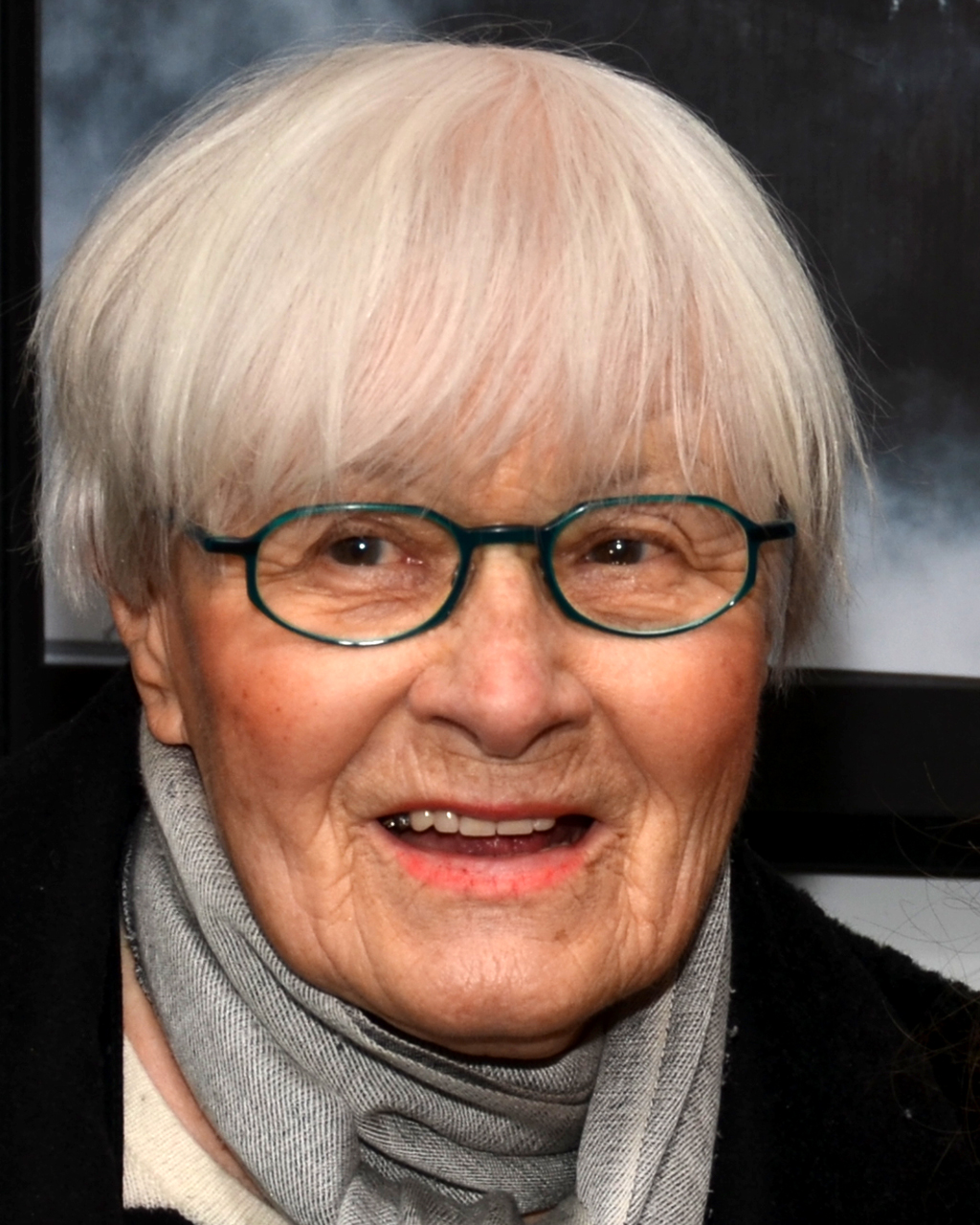
- Eva Fuka in 2015
- Born: Eva Podešvová; May 5, 1927; Prague, Czech Republic
- Died: November 25, 2015 (aged 88)
- Known for: Photography
- Spouses: Vladimir Fuka (m. 1950–1977) David H. Engle (m. 1986)

Eva Fuka-Engle (in Czech Eva Fuková, née Eva Podešvová, May 5, 1927 – November 25, 2015) was a Czech American photographer.

== Biography ==
Fuka was born on May 5, 1927, in Prague, Czechoslovakia. Her father, Frantisek Podesva, was a painter and her mother, Marie, was a writer. Her grandfather was a founder of the daily Czech newspaper Lidové noviny.

In 1942, she attended the State School of Graphic Arts in Prague under Professor Rudolf Skopec, and later studied at the Academy of Visual Arts, from 1945 to 1950. She married fellow-artist Vladimír Fuka in 1950, and gave birth to her only child, Ivana, in 1951.

In 1967 she defected with her family to the US. Her first husband died from diabetes in 1977. She married David H Engle in 1986. At the time of her death, Fuka was retired and split her time between New York City, Prague, Paris and the French Alps where she spent her summers.

Fuka died on 25 November 2015 at the age of 88.

== Photography ==
Fuka's artwork is characterized by surreal and melancholic effects, which she achieved by using her environment to create unreal settings with a dreamlike atmosphere. She ranks among the founding figures of Czech photography who introduced different approaches to the practice by taking advantage of her surroundings to attain particular effects between lights and shadows. Her work as a photographer started in 1939, when her father gifted her a Leica. Later on, in 1951, she and her husband became friends with dissident intellectuals Jiří Kolář, Jan Hanč, Kamil Lhoták, Jan Rychlík, Zdeněk Urbánek, and Josef Schwarz.

In 1963 she published a monograph, an important step in her work as both photographer and woman artist, because photography was still struggling to be recognized in the world of art at the beginning of the sixties. A second monograph was published in 2007, by Torst, after Fuka had two big exhibitions, in 1996 and 2007.
