= Painting (Blue Star) =

1927 painting by Joan Miró

- Artist: Joan Miró
- Year: 1927
- Medium: oil on canvas
- Dimensions: 115.5 cm × 89 cm (45.5 in × 35 in)
- Location: Private collection

Painting (Blue Star) (French: Peinture (Étoile Bleue)) is an oil painting by the Spanish artist Joan Miró, from 1927. In June 2012, it sold at auction for £23.5 million, at Sotheby's London, setting a new record for the highest price paid for a painting by Miró.
