= 1928 in art =

Events from the year 1928 in art.

== Events ==
- January 7 – The Tate Gallery, London, is one of the buildings flooded by the 1928 Thames flood.
- January 27 – The Huntington Library is officially opened to the public in San Marino, California. Major art exhibits include a large collection of 18th-century British portraits and a display of French tapestries of the same period.
- March 26 – The China Academy of Art is founded in Hangzhou (originally named the National Academy of Art).
- August – Ben Nicholson and Kit Wood visit St. Ives, Cornwall, and meet the ex-fisherman painter Alfred Wallis.
- October – English artist and designer Eric Gill moves with some of his artistic community from Capel-y-ffin in Wales to 'Pigotts' at Speen, Buckinghamshire, near High Wycombe.
- November 18 – Film debut of Mickey Mouse, designed by Ub Iwerks.
- Clarice Cliff introduces her Crocus pottery decoration.
- Pierre Chareau and colleagues begin construction of the Maison de Verre ("house of glass") on the rue Saint-Guillaume in Paris for client Jean Dalsace.
- Charles Haslewood Shannon suffers a fall while hanging a picture which ends his career as an artist.

== Awards ==
- Archibald Prize: John Longstaff – Portrait of Dr Alexander Leeper
- Carnegie Prize – André Derain
- Art competitions at the 1928 Summer Olympics
  - Painting: Isaac Israëls – Cavalier Rouge
  - Drawing: Jean Jacoby – Rugby
  - Graphic work: William Nicholson – An Almanac of Twelve Sports

== Exhibitions ==
- Alexander Calder's first solo exhibition at the Weyhe Gallery, New York City.
- L'Exposition surréaliste at the Galerie du Sacre du Printemps, Paris.
- December – East London Group (as East London Art Club) exhibits at Whitechapel Gallery.

== Works ==
- Wäinö Aaltonen – bust of Jean Sibelius
- Tarsila do Amaral – Abaporu
- Max Beckmann – The Wendelsveg in Frankfurt am Main
- Pierre Bonnard – Flowers on a Red Carpet
- John Steuart Curry
  - Baptism in Kansas
  - Bathers
- Charles Demuth – I Saw the Figure 5 in Gold
- Edwin Dickinson – The Fossil Hunters
- Otto Dix – Metropolis
- M. C. Escher – Tower of Babel (woodcut)
- Meredith Frampton – Marguerite Kelsey
- George Grosz – Hinterground (portfolio of lithographs)
- Edward Hopper
  - From Williamsburg Bridge
  - Manhattan Bridge Loop
  - Night Windows
- Prudence Heward – Girl on a Hill
- Frida Kahlo – Dama de Blanco
- André Kertész – The Fork (photograph)
- Paul Klee – Cat and Bird
- Sir John Lavery – Portrait of Lady Lavery as Kathleen Ni Houlihan
- Tamara de Lempicka
  - Andromeda
  - Portrait of Dr. Boucard
- L. S. Lowry
  - A Street Scene
  - Going to the Match
- Eugenie McEvoy – Taxi! Taxi!
- René Magritte
  - The Adulation of Space
  - The Empty Mask
  - The Lovers
- Henri Matisse
  - Odalisque with a Turkish Chair
  - Two Odalisques, One Being Nude, Ornamental Ground and Checkerboard
- Ivan Meštrović – The Bowman and The Spearman (equestrian sculptures, Chicago)
- Joan Miró – Dutch Interiors
- Giuseppe Moretti – Statue of Elizabeth and Joseph E. Brown
- Georgia O'Keeffe
  - East River from the Shelton Hotel
  - East River from the Thirtieth Story of the Shelton Hotel
  - Oriental Poppies
- Mahmoud Mokhtar – Egypt's Renaissance (sculpture group, Cairo University, begun 1919, completed)
- Frederick Roth – Equestrian statue of George Washington (Morristown, New Jersey) (bronze)
- Frank O. Salisbury – Clarence Winthrop Bowen
- Christian Schad – Two Girlfriends
- Charles Sheeler – Upper Deck (photograph, approximate date)
- Zinaida Serebriakova – Lit By The Sun
- Charles Sims – I Am the Abyss and I Am Light
- John French Sloan – Sixth Avenue Elevated at Third Street
- Joseph Southall – The Botanists
- Alexej von Jawlensky – Abstract Head
- George Fite Waters – Statue of Abraham Lincoln (Portland, Oregon) (bronze)

== Births ==
=== January to June ===
- January 20 – Malang, Filipino artist (d. 2017)
- January 31 – Dušan Džamonja, Macedonian sculptor (d. 2009)
- February 10 – Jos De Mey, Belgian impossible figure painter (d. 2007)
- March 1 – Jacques Rivette, French filmmaker (d. 2016)
- March 3 – Jean Rustin, French painter (d. 2013)
- March 18 – Mirka Mora, French-Australian artist and cultural figure (d. 2018)
- March 25 – Hans Steinbrenner, German sculptor (d. 2008)
- April 25 – Cy Twombly, American abstract artist (d. 2011)
- April 28 – Yves Klein, French abstract artist (d. 1962)
- May 4 – Brian O'Doherty aka Patrick Ireland, Irish-born art critic and installation artist (d. 2022)
- May 11 – Yaacov Agam, Israeli kinetic sculptor (d. 2026)
- May 14 – Władysław Hasior, Polish sculptor, painter and set designer (d. 1999)
- May 30 – Pro Hart, Australian painter (d. 2006)
- June 3 – Donald Judd, American sculptor (d. 1994)
- June 16 – Pierrette Bloch, French-Swiss painter, textile artist (d. 2017)
- June 25
  - Peyo (born Pierre Culliford), Belgian comics artist (d. 1992)
  - Alex Toth, American comic book artist and cartoonist (d. 2006)

=== July to December ===
- July 8 – Pat Adams, American painter and printmaker
- July 10 – Bernard Buffet, French painter (d. 1999)
- July 14 – Anwar Shemza, Pakistan-born British artist and writer (d. 1985)
- July 21 – Anne Harris, Canadian sculptor
- August 6 – Andy Warhol, American pop artist, director and writer (d. 1987)
- August 12 – Charles Blackman, Australian painter and illustrator (d. 2018)
- August 15 – Alan Collins, English figurative religious sculptor (d. 2016)
- August 22 – Roberto Aizenberg, Argentine painter and sculptor (d. 1996)
- August 31 – Jeremy Maas, English art dealer and historian of Victorian painting (d. 1997)
- September 9 – Sol LeWitt, American conceptual and minimalist artist (d. 2007)
- September 10 - Ward Jackson, American painter (d. 2004)
- September 12 – Robert Irwin, American installation artist (d. 2023)
- September 13 – Robert Indiana (born Clark), American pop artist (d. 2018)
- October 7 – Sohrab Sepehri, Persian poet and painter (d. 1980)
- October 12 – Al Held, American Abstract expressionist painter (d. 2005)
- October 30 – Michael Andrews, English painter (d. 1995)
- November 3 – Osamu Tezuka, Japanese manga artist, animator and film producer (d. 1989)
- November 6 – Norman Carlberg, American sculptor (d. 2018)
- November 17 – Arman, French-born American artist (d. 2005)
- November 27 – Josh Kirby, English commercial artist (d. 2001)
- December 2 – Guy Bourdin, French photographer (d. 1991)
- December 12 – Helen Frankenthaler, American abstract expressionist painter (d. 2011)
- December 13 – Wolfgang Hutter, Austrian painter, lithographer and designer (d. 2014)
- December 15 – Friedensreich Hundertwasser, Austrian painter, architect and sculptor (d. 2000)
- December 31 – Siné, French cartoonist (d. 2016)

=== Date unknown ===
- Ben Birillo, American painter and art curator
- Franco the Great, born Frankin Gaskin, Panamanian-born American street artist
- Wally Hedrick, American counterculture artist (d. 2003)

== Deaths ==
- January 4 – Hamilton Hamilton, American painter (b. 1847)
- January 6 – Adolfo de Carolis, Italian painter, xylographer, illustrator and photographer (b. 1874)
- January 8 – Gyula Basch, Hungarian painter (b. 1859)
- January 13 – Frederick Arthur Bridgman, American painter (b. 1847)
- January 21 – Nikolai Astrup, Norwegian painter (b. 1880)
- January 26 – Henrietta Rae, English painter (b. 1859)
- January – Alexander Reid, Scottish art dealer (b. 1854)
- February 7 – Adolfo de Carolis, Italian painter (b. 1874)
- February 12 – Nicolás Guzmán Bustamante, Chilean painter and draftsman (b. 1850)
- March 31 – Medardo Rosso, Italian sculptor (b. 1858)
- April 3 – Raffaello Romanelli, Italian sculptor (b. 1856)
- April 5 – Viktor Oliva, Czech painter and illustrator (b. 1861)
- April 13 – Charles Sims, English painter (suicide, b. 1873)
- May 16 – Frederick Arthur Verner, Canadian landscape painter (b. 1836)
- May 21 - George Frampton, English artist (b. 1860)
- June 22 – A. B. Frost, American illustrator (b. 1851)
- July 10 – John Chambers, English landscape and portrait painter (b. 1852)
- July 25 – Jane Sutherland, Australian landscape painter (b. 1853)
- August 30 – Franz Stuck, German symbolist /Art Nouveau painter, sculptor, engraver and architect (b. 1863)
- September 20 – Ivan Tišov, Croatian painter (b. 1870)
- October 24 – Arthur Bowen Davies, American artist (b. 1863)
- October 30 – Percy Anderson, English stage designer and painter (b. 1851)
- November 15 – Godfred Christensen, Danish painter (b. 1845)
- December 1 – Leopold Graf von Kalckreuth, German painter (b. 1855)
- December 2 – Robert Reid, American Impressionist painter (b. 1862)
- December 10 – Charles Rennie Mackintosh, Scottish architect and designer (b. 1868)
- December 15 – Louis Mathieu Verdilhan, French painter (b. 1875)
- December 18 – Nils Bergslien, Norwegian illustrator, painter and sculptor (b. 1853)

== See also ==
- 1928 in fine arts of the Soviet Union
