= Medusa (Jawlensky) =

1923 painting by Alexej von Jawlensky

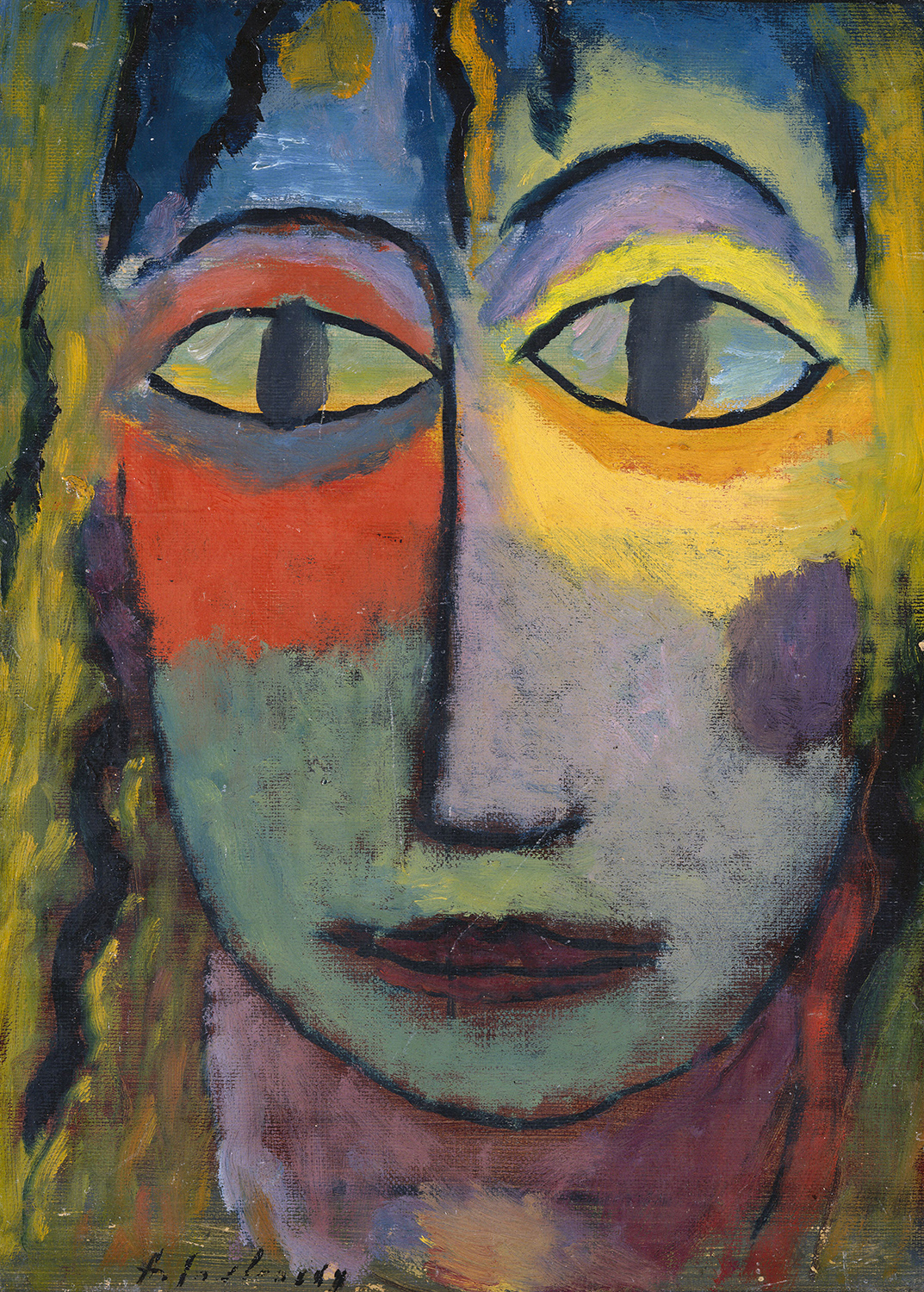
Medusa (1923) by Alexej von Jawlensky

Medusa (French - La Méduse) or Head of a Woman "Medusa", Light and Shadow (Tête de femme « Méduse », Lumière et Ombre) is a 1923 Expressionist painting by Russian painter Alexej von Jawlensky. It is held in the Musée des Beaux-Arts de Lyon, which acquired it in 1936. It is a work by the artist from the time when he began to focus on painting the human figure, in 1917.
