= Franco the Great =

Panamanian-American street artist (b. 1928)

Franco the Great (born Frankin Gaskin; 1928) is a street artist based in Manhattan, New York City. He was born and raised in Panama, and is fluent in Portuguese, Spanish and English. Franco the Great is also referred to as the "Harlem Picasso".

He earned notoriety by painting storefront security gates in West Harlem neighborhoods. Original pieces of Franco's are found today on 125th Street surrounding the Apollo Theater (between Frederick Douglass Blvd. and Adam Clayton Powell Jr. Blvd). Franco's murals on security gates are only viewable when the gates of the stores are closed.

According to the New York Daily Times, Franco's murals have contributed to making Harlem a tourist destination. His work can also be found inside businesses across United States, France, Germany, Switzerland, Japan, Canada, Spain, Brazil, the Caribbean Islands, Senegal, and several other African countries.

== Early life ==
At the age of nine, Franco fell down several stories. This led to serious head injuries and a state of coma for a month. He later developed a disability. During this period, Franco developed an interest in art drawing and magic. At 9 years old, with the encouragement of a local Catholic priest, he went on to study performance as a stage magician.

The artist Danzig tutored Franco in speech lessons for four years, to assist in his performance in front of huge crowds. Danzig also encouraged him to sell his works, in order to move to New York as an artist and magician.

== Art career ==
In 1958, Franco moved from Panama to New York to work as an artist. In New York City, he donated his work to different establishments and later became known in the native Spanish community.

In 1968, as a reaction to the riots after Martin Luther King's assassination, storeowners in Harlem added corrugate steel gates to their storefronts. Franco the Great viewed the gates as canvases to express his art and to call for positive change. On Sundays, a day where most stores were closed in Harlem at the time, Franco crafted his art to create positivity-promoting and African-American themed murals on the gates. Since 1968, Franco has painted over 200 gates, from the East to the West side of 125th Street, and beyond.

Currently, many of the security gate murals have been removed or repainted grey, following the zoning laws in 2008 which required store owners to install "see-through" gates. Aside from the gates in active use today, 25 gates have been removed and put into storage to commemorate Franco the Great's work. The "Save the Gates" Campaign was established with supporters voicing to have Franco's mural gates relocated and preserved in Triboro Plaza.

In 2011, the Harlem Community Development Corporation was reported to be working on a plan to preserve Franco's gates and have them framed and on permanent display between 1st and 2nd avenues, creating an outdoor gallery. Framing the gates would cost an estimated $250,000. In December 2014, developer Forest City Ratner announced plans to showcase the remaining gates in East River Plaza, as an homage to the Harlem of the past.
