= Eugenie McEvoy =

American painter

- Born: Eugenie Wehrle; March 12, 1879 (Note: There is disagreement regarding McEvoy's birth date. See the discussion of this topic in the "Date and place of birth" section.); New York (Note: There is disagreement regarding McEvoy's Place of birth. See the discussion of this topic in the "Date and place of birth" section.)
- Died: 1975; Woodstock, New York

Eugenie McEvoy (1879-1975) was an American artist known for her landscapes, flowers, portraits, and, particularly, the painting, Taxi! Taxi! (1928) which depicts a busy city street as seen from the back seat of a taxicab. She also performed in a sharpshooting act on the vaudeville stage, ran a kennel for breeding show dogs, served as manager and technical director of theatrical production companies, operated a large resort property in the Catskill region of New York, and worked with her husband in a piano restoration business.

== Early life and training ==
Eugenie McEvoy learned to paint sometime before 1906 while she was living in France. Because there is no record that she received any formal instruction, it is possible that she learned from her first husband, the American painter, George Ames Aldrich, who was an illustrator and decorative artist specializing in romantic rural landscapes. (Note: George Ames Aldrich (1872–1941) was an American landscape artist. Born in Worcester, Massachusetts, he studied for a short time at the Art Students' League in New York. His paintings are generally romantic views of streams, mills, and rural villages. In subject and treatment, they resemble the work of the Norwegian painter, Frits Thaulow. He made a precarious living, seeking buyers mainly through exhibits in the civic clubs, libraries, and hotels of the central Midwest—Rockford, South Bend, and other towns and cities of Illinois and Indiana. Aldrich was said to be an artistic poseur who made up a biography aimed at boosting the sale of his pictures in local shows at clubs, libraries, and similar venues in the towns and urban centers of Northern Illinois and Indiana. According to one source, "In Indiana, in a place like South Bend or Sioux Falls, he would arrive as this European-trained professional artist and everybody would be dazzled by his high international stature, which was completely something he created for them.") (Note: Aldrich's paintings were commercial in the sense that he frequently copied of his own work and that they were sometimes purchased for use in commercial settings, such as the walls of hotel guest rooms, and they varied very little in subject (almost all feature a stream flowing toward the viewer accompanied by houses and other structures in what contemporaries saw as a romantic setting), but they have sufficient interest to have received modern critical attention and presentation in a retrospective exhibition of 2013.) (Note: Wendy Greenhouse, the principal author of the catalog for the 2013 exhibition of Aldrich's works, wrote in a recent article: "With their blend of naturalistic verisimilitude and poetic sentiment, his paintings fulfilled a popular ideal of art as a soothing refuge from modernity, at once accessible and refined, familiar and removed. His approach was almost invariably euphemistic, 'reveal[ing] a romanticist' who 'sees an idyll in a French village and a magnificent pageant in a steel foundry,' according to one contemporary. Combining romantic scenery, elegiac sentiment, and facile technique, Aldrich's typical paintings offer comfort laced with a touch of melancholy and regret, promising a safe haven in an era of dizzying change.")

== Mature style ==
In 1918 McEvoy became a student at the School of the Art Institute of Chicago. Two years later McEvoy and Aldrich spent time at a village on the Breton coast called Quimperlé where Aldrich made sketches for a series of paintings. The location presented views of a type he favored: quaint structures clustered around a broad expanse of water crossed by an ancient bridge, in this case the Ellé river crossed by the 16th-century pont fleuri. McEvoy also made pictures of this scene and, in 1922, showed a painting called Quimperlé in an exhibition at the Art Institute of Chicago containing work by alumni of its school. In 1928 she placed a painting of hers in the Twelfth Annual Exhibition of the Society of Independent Artists held at the Waldorf-Astoria. Originally entitled Lenox 2300, the painting became well known under a later title, Taxi! Taxi!. (The name, "Lenox 2300", was displayed on the door panels of New York's yellow taxicabs during the 1920s.) (Note: "Lenox 2300" was the dispatcher's phone number at American Yellow Cab Operators, Inc., which ran the cab pictured in McEvoy's painting. The business and its cabs are described in some detail in an article appearing in the National Taxicab and Motorbus Journal of June 1922.) Reviewing the Independents' show, Helen Appleton Read, the art critic for the Brooklyn Daily Eagle, called McEvoy's painting "an amusing canvas of what can best be designated as a petting party in a yellow taxi."

Eugenie McEvoy, "Taxi! Taxi!", 1928, oil on canvas, 36" x 32", collection of Jason Schoen

When in 1931 McEvoy contributed a painting called Cuban Village to the Society of Independent Artists exhibition at Grand Central Galleries, New York, a critic described it as "red roofs surrounded by tropical greenage, extremely well painted." The following year she put works in an exhibit sponsored by Salons of America (Note: In 1922 by Hamilton Easter Field founded Salons of America to give artists an alternative to the Society of Independent Artists whose financial and publicity methods he found objectionable. A reporter said he aimed "to give equal opportunity to every member, whether he or she be a conservative or a post-Dadaist.") and when she exhibited at the Salons the following year she showed her 1928 painting, Lenox 2300, now renamed Taxi! Taxi!. This time the painting drew the attention of critics for both the New York Sun and New York Times. The Sun's Henry McBride said it gave a "cinematic version of congested street traffic", rising above the quality of other works in the show, though "laboriously expressed." Edward Alden Jewell, in the Times, praised the painting for "the amazing skill with which technical difficulties have been tossed off by this artist" adding "not often does one encounter such sang froid at that. The painting's point of view is that of an unenthusiastic woman passenger who is permitting a male companion to nuzzle her neck. The two can be seen reflected in the glass screen that divides the front of the cab from the back. The driver's head is seen from behind and his image shows on his cab license on the back of the front seat. The viewer sees the hats of the cab's passengers and their intertwined feet. Through the cab's front and side windows can be seen a street crowded with pedestrians and traffic, including two autos comically teetering. The fare shown on the meter is high, suggesting a lengthy and unhurried trip. (Note: For a full description of the painting see Jerry N. Smith's Auto-America: The Automobile and American Art, Circa 1900–1950.) McEvoy exhibited this painting at an exhibition held by the Woodstock Art Association later in 1933, in 1949 at a solo exhibition at Town House in Woodstock, and again in 1956 at the Woodstock Museum of Art (where it drew comment as "Eugenie McEvoy's renowned canvas.")

Following the Salons of America exhibition of 1933 McEvoy showed her work mainly in Woodstock and vicinity. She appeared twice or three times a year in Woodstock galleries and less frequently in places like Poughkeepsie (Note: In 1935 McEvoy showed a painting called Deserted House in a group show at a fair sponsored by the Poughkeepsie County Association.) and Albany, New York. (Note: In 1937 McEvoy participated in a group exhibition at Albany's Art Institute.) In a Woodstock Gallery exhibition of September 1935 she showed the painting, Quimperlé, which she had first shown in 1922. It was described as "a picturesque hillside town with a brilliant spot of sunlight on the topmost turrets, high above the gloomier buildings at the foot of the hill." In 1943 she placed a painting in a group show held in a New York Department store, Macy's Gallery of Tomorrow's Masterpieces. In 1948 and 1949 her work appeared in solo exhibitions in Woodstock. Of the first, a local reporter noted a gay atmosphere in the show and praised the lively appearance of McEvoy's subjects and her subtle use of color. The second included landscapes, flowers, houses, and portraits, as well as her well-known Taxi! Taxi!. A news account of the show said, "There is a feeling of strength about this artist's work. Also noticeable is an exceptional quality gained through the use of white." (Note: The Kingston Daily Freeman listed the 25 works included in the solo exhibition at Town House: African Violets, Along the Sawkill, Ashokan Reservoir, Black Eyed Susan, Cactus in Bloom, Callas, City Improvisation, Deserted House, Flowers, French Village in the Voges, Haunted House, Home Coming, House in Plymouth, Iris, Iris and Peonies, Landscape in Woodstock, Mt. Marion Church, Nasturtiums, Peonies, Show, St. Augustine, Sun Flowers, Taxi! Taxi!, Three Potted Plants, and Vase of Flowers.)

Apart from Taxi! Taxi! McEvoy's work received scant notice from New York art critics. Reporting on an interview conducted late in her career one reporter said her paintings showed "solid brushwork and rich colors" and praised her ability to transform "commonplace subject matter into a bold and exciting statement." (Note: This reporter also somewhat misleadingly said that the New York Times "suggested in 1943 that her fine paintings would be among 'Tomorrow's Masterpieces' whereas in fact the Times item referred not to McEvoy or her paintings but to the name of a group exhibition (i.e., "Tomorrow's Masterpieces") which was hung in a ninth-floor gallery of Macy's department store on Herald Square in New York.)

== Personal information ==
Little is known of McEvoy's life as a child. The date and place of her birth are uncertain. She once reported that, as a child, she had received marksmanship training from her father, a captain in the French army, but on another occasion said that she had been orphaned as a baby and raised in France by her mother's family. The conflict between these accounts can be reconciled if it is assumed that she treated the uncle who was her guardian as if he were her father. In any event, her parents' names are listed in a 1923 record of her marriage to J. P. McEvoy as Ernst Wehrle and Eugenie A. Lerradde. These may be the names either of her birth parents or of the family members who brought her up.

McEvoy was described as petite. She was five feet tall, had blue eyes, and spoke English with a "soft-spoken French accent".

Date and place of birth

Public sources provide various dates for McEvoy's birth. Brief biographies on art reference websites give 1879, yet as an adult she frequently said she was younger than she would have been had she been born that year. For example, on returning from France in 1906 she reported her age as 26, giving a presumptive birth year of 1880. (Note: This record allows for a birth year that would be 1879 if, as is likely, her birthdate fell between January 1, and July 5. The ship's manifest for her arrival from France in 1906 shows her as a U.S. citizen under the name "Mrs. Geo. A. Aldrich.") Other presumptive birth years recorded in official records are 1888, (Note: On re-marrying George A. Aldrich in 1919, she reported her age as 31 giving a presumptive birth year of 1888 and in 1920, when Aldrich applied for a passport for himself and his wife, her birth date was reported as March 12, 1888. She gave her age as 35 on returning to New York after traveling in Europe later in 1923,) 1889, (Note: The United States Census for 1920 reports her age as 31 giving a presumptive birth year of 1889.) 1890, (Note: The U.S. Census for 1930 reports her age as 40 and, on returning from a trip abroad in 1931, she gave the same age.) 1891, (Note: She gave her age as 36 again on arriving in 1927 from further travel abroad, giving a presumptive birth year of 1891.) 1895, (Note: In 1923, when McEvoy married Joseph Patrick McEvoy, she reported her age as 28 giving a presumptive birth year of 1895 and she gave her age as 36 on returning from another trip to Europe in 1925.) and 1898. (Note: The 1940 Census reports her age as 42 giving a presumptive birth year of 1898.) Some sources list her place of birth as New York and one gives "United States", while others give France as birthplace. An obituary says she was born in the United States and on the death of her parents was raised in France by her mother's family.

Those public records which give a day and month for McEvoy's birth all say she was born on March 12. (Note: The record for Aldrich's passport application in 1920 and the passenger list for her return to New York from Paris, with her family, in 1925 both give her birth date as March 12, 1888. The passenger lists for return to New York from France in 1927 and 1931 give her birth date as March 12, 1890.)

Other names

Her maiden name was Eugenie Wehrle. (Note: There is no definitive evidence that her surname was Wehrle and not Wherle, but reference sources favor the former.) One source gives her name as Eugénie. She used Eugenie McEvoy as her profession as artist and that is the name used in most newspaper reports regarding herself and her work. As a performer she used Mlle. or sometimes Mme. D'Aures. (Note: See for example an article appearing in the issue of the Daily Illini for December 11, 1919, which refers to her act as "M'lle D'Aures and company" in "The Curtain of Victory.") As a breeder of purebred collies, she gave her name as Mrs. G. Ames Aldrich.

Wife of George Ames Aldrich

At age 26 or 27 she married the artist George Ames Aldrich in Paris and in 1906 returned with him to New York. (Note: Aldrich had been making frequent trips to France and nearby countries to find locations for his trademark paintings of quaint rural landscapes. In 1894 he had made his first trip to Europe both to paint and study painting. He remained there for six years. He returned to France again between 1904 and 1906.)

Collie breeding

Aldrich and McEvoy moved about frequently during the early years of their marriage. Their travels took them to California, New England, and the Mid-Atlantic states of the U.S. as well as to Winnipeg, Canada, and, in 1910, back to Europe. One purpose of the trips was a business they had begun in 1910 to raise and sell purebred collies. Between 1914 and 1917 issues of the trade journal, Dog Fancier (Note: Published in Battle Creek, Michigan, and founded in 1891, this illustrated monthly publication contained calendars of events, notes from kennel owners, advertisements, and reports of shows.) contained notes and display ads from McEvoy and Aldrich offering their dogs for sale. (Note: In 1914 McEvoy, as Mrs. G. Ames Aldrich of Philadelphia, put a notice in this magazine seeking customers, the following year she was listed as co-owner (with Aldrich) of a registered collie bitch called Amescroft Futuriste, and in 1916 she whelped collies named Amescroft Pichounette and Amescroft Atlantis which in 1918 were listed in the American Kennel Club Stud Book.) In 1917 they sold off their dogs and closed down their kennel. A biographic sketch published in 1975 says that McEvoy "once owned 47 collies, among them blue ribbon winners and champions several times over" and had become a recognized author on collie breeding (although no record of a publication by her survives).

Citizenship question

On July 19, 1919, Aldrich and McEvoy married again, this time in Chicago. No reason has been given for this second marriage. It may be that she thought U.S. officials would not recognize her first, French, one. In 1920, during a period when U.S. citizens were required to hold passports, Aldrich applied for one that listed both himself and McEvoy as his wife. (Note: Passports were required of U.S. citizens from August 18, 1918, to March 3, 1921. See the Wikipedia entry on U.S. passports.) It also may be that evidence of McEvoy's birth in the United States was weak. If so, that would explain why the passport application showed McEvoy as born in France to French parents and a public document of 1923 says she became a U.S. citizen by being naturalized through marriage. (Note: Note that in 1923, when she married Joseph Patrick McEvoy, McEvoy was again listed as born in France yet and on ships' manifests and census reports after this date she listed her birthplace as New York or the United States.)

Vaudeville sharpshooter

In 1919 McEvoy began to appear in a sharpshooting act on the vaudeville circuits of Illinois, Indiana, and Iowa. Billing herself as "Mlle. D'Aures" she called her act "The Curtain of Victory." (Note: See announcements in the South Bend News-Times of February 21, 1919 (p. 15), the Rock Island Argus of March 26, 1919 (p. 13), and the Free Trader-Journal (Ottawa, Ill.) of February 28, 1920 (p. 5); as well as display ads appearing in the Daily Illini for December 11 and 12, 1919 and for February 3, 1920; and notices in the New York Clipper of May 5, 1919 (p. 31) and May 12, 1920 (p. 20).) (Note: McEvoy sometimes used "Mme." rather than "Mlle." and at least once billed herself as "Mlle. D'Aures, the French Actress.") Regarding one of her performances, a newspaper reporter said, "From the first line trenches on the western front to the vaudeville stage is a long step, but it is one taken by M'lle D'Aures and company, another feature of the Orpheum bill for Thursday, Friday and Saturday. M'lle and assistant present a most thrilling sharp shooting act entitled "The Curtain of Victory." M'lle D'Aures is a dainty little miss who received her training as a sharpshooter from her father, who was a captain in the French army. At one time, while shooting in a public gallery, she shot a match with King Leopold of Belgium, who appeared incognito, and she bested him." A news item appearing in 1975 reported that McEvoy had learned to shoot as a young child while living in France and at that age had been able to shoot a pipe from her cousin's mouth with a rifle. (Note: The 1920 U.S. Census gives McEvoy's occupation as actress,) In 1921, on her separation from Aldrich, McEvoy stopped appearing on the vaudeville stage and concentrated on her career as professional artist.

Wife of Joseph P. McEvoy

On February 15, 1923, McEvoy married J.P. McEvoy, a successful author of comic strips, humorous stories, newspaper feature articles, and satiric plays. (Note: The marriage record gives her childhood name, Eugenie Wehrle, rather than her married one, Eugenie Aldrich, and gives her marital status as divorced.) He was born in New York on January 10, 1895, and, like her, he had (1) been raised by a couple who were not his parents and (2) been previously married and divorced. (Note: J.P. McEvoy's first wife was Mary Wurn. Born Mary Crotty, she had married Arnold B. Wurm (later changed to Wurnelle) about 1904.) (Note: Mary Crotty Wurn was an actress. J.P. had married Mary Crotty on April 14, 1915, in Lake, Indiana.) (Note: There is another record for a marriage between J. P. McEvoy and Mary Crotty in Chicago on April 3, 1915.) He had assumed the name Joseph Patrick McEvoy in 1910 when entering his first year as a student at the University of Notre Dame. (Note: His birth name was Joseph Hilliek or Hillick and McEvoy was the name of the couple who adopted him.) J.P. and his first wife had two children, Dorothy (born April 3, 1916) and Dennis (born July 27, 1918). By a previous marriage, J.P.'s first wife had a son, Reynold Thomas Wurnelle (later known as Renny McEvoy). When J.P. and his first wife divorced, Dorothy and Dennis remained with J.P. while Reynold stayed with his mother. (Note: In 1923 and 1925 passenger arrival lists for returns from European travels say that McEvoy was accompanied by her husband and two children, Dorothy and Dennis. There is no mention of Reynold Thomas Wurnelle. (The list of 1923 also shows her to be 35 years old, naturalized through marriage, and living in New York.))

A few months after their wedding J. P. and Eugenie founded a New York theatrical production company called the Masque Producing Corporation and later the same year she drew designs for a one-act play he wrote called "Adam and Eve." Before the year was out they had bought a 20-acre estate in Woodstock, New York. Over the next few years they remodeled the manor house and added two wings to it, and later built a guest house, two studios, a stable, and a swimming pool on the property. In 1937 J. P. wrote a humorous article about it. Living there, Eugenie showed herself to be an accomplished horsewoman. J. P.'s success as a writer continued to grow and by 1928 he was producing his own plays with Eugenie as technical director.

In 1931 J. P. and Eugenie separated and he provided her with a substantial income. (Note: In the separation agreement J. P. put up a bond of $50,000 as security against monthly payments he promised to give her. In addition to the cash, the bond was secured by the 20-acre estate in Woodside.) A year later Eugenie obtained a divorce in Reno, Nevada, and continued to receive monthly payments. In 1936 J. P. remarried. (Note: On December 20, 1936, in Las Vegas, Nevada, J. P. was married for the third (and final) time. He wife was journalist Margaret Santry, ten years his junior. They had two daughters, Patricia and Margaret.) The same year he changed the settlement agreement with Eugenie, providing her with a monthly income and conveying to her the Woodside estate with its mortgage. The following year she sued him for failing make more than a year's worth of monthly payments for which the settlement had provided.

In 1939 and 1940 McEvoy had limited success in finding tenants for the Woodstock estate. In 1941 she converted it to a resort, called Fountainebleau, using musicians and other performers as service staff and in 1942 she sold off some of the land.

Wife of Philip O'Dell

On October 4, 1949, McEvoy married for a third time. Her new husband was a musician, Woodstock resident Philip O'Dell. The report of their wedding said they planned to open a school in Woodstock to teach piano and painting. Later, he taught her piano tuning and she helped him repair fine old pianos. In the 1950s, as a member of the Woodstock Garden Club, McEvoy created flower arrangements for the club's annual flower shows.

Close of life

During the two-and-a-half decades of the 1950s, 1960s, and early 1970s, McEvoy remained married to O'Dell and continued to live in Woodstock. She had been 26 or 27 when she married George Ames Aldrich, 42 when she married J. P. McEvoy, and 70 when she married Daniel O'Dell. She had been 40 when she began performing on the vaudeville stage, 49 when she first showed her famous taxi painting, and 57 when she assumed ownership and management of the large estate in Woodside. She was 29 when she participated in her first, and 86 when she participated in her last exhibition in New York. On July 22, 1975, Eugenie McEvoy died in Woodstock at the age of 96. (Note: The calculations of McEvoy's age at various points in her career assume that she was born early in the year. There is some warrant for this assumption in that the only month and day given for her birth in any public record is March 12.)

== Exhibitions ==
Between 1931 and 1957 McEvoy's paintings usually appeared twice a year during the summer season in Woodstock. Between 1934 and 1947 she showed in group exhibitions of the Woodstock Artists Association. In the early 1950s she showed at the Walk Up Gallery. This list of exhibitions is representative rather than comprehensive. It is taken from notices in local newspapers, particularly the Kingston Daily Freeman.

- 1922 Group exhibition, exhibition of work of alumni, Art Institute of Chicago
- 1927 Group exhibition, Woodstock Art Association
- 1928 Group exhibition, Society of Independent Artists, New York
- 1928 Group exhibition, Woodstock Art Association, Woodstock, New York
- 1931 Group exhibition, Society of Independent Artists, Grand Central Galleries, New York
- 1931 Group exhibition, Salons of America, American Art Association - Anderson Galleries, New York
- 1933 Group exhibition, Salons of America, New York
- 1935 Group exhibition, County Association, Poughkeepsie, New York
- 1937 Group exhibition, Capital District Artists, Art Institute, Albany, New York
- 1937 Group exhibition, Twelfth Annual Exhibit of Artists of the Upper Hudson, Albany, New York
- 1940 Group exhibition, Blossom Festival Show, Woodstock, New York
- 1942 Group exhibition, Little Gallery, Woodstock, New York
- 1943 Group exhibition, Macy's Gallery of Tomorrow's Masterpieces, New York
- 1948 Solo Exhibition, Mollie Smith Gallery, Woodstock, New York
- 1948 Group exhibition, Deanie's Gallery Room, Woodstock, New York
- 1949 Solo exhibition, Town House, Woodstock, New York
- 1952 Group exhibition, Terry National Art Exhibit, Terry Art Institute, Miami, Florida
- 1955 Group exhibition, Recent Work Show, Woodstock, New York
- 1956 Group exhibition, Woodstock Museum of Art, Woodstock, New York
- 1956 Group exhibition, Guild of Craftsmen, Guild Galleries, Woodstock, New York
- 1961 Group exhibition, Woodstock Museum of Art, Woodstock, New York
- 1961 Group exhibition, Long Island University Galleries, Brooklyn, New York
- 1961 Group exhibition, Post Office, Woodstock, New York
- 1965 Group exhibition, Britts Kingston Plaza Shopping Center, Kingston, New York
