= Jean Rustin =

French painter (1928–2013)

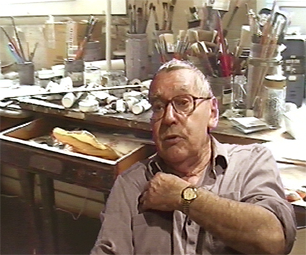
Jean Rustin

Jean Rustin (3 March 1928 – 24 December 2013) was a French painter and prominent figurative artist.

== Biography ==
Rustin was born at Montigny-lès-Metz on 3 March 1928. At the age of 19 he moved to Paris where he studied at the School of Fine Arts, in the studio of Untersteller. During the 1950s he was mainly preoccupied with abstract painting but from the 1970s he embarked on figuration. He created a bizarre world of human figures, where an existential dead-end is transformed into fright, abhorrence, pity but also relief.

The artist stated that....."I realize that behind my artistic creation, behind the fascination for the naked body, there are twenty centuries of painting, primarily religious, twenty centuries of dead Christs, tortured martyrs, gory revolutions, massacres and shattered dreams [...] I realize that history and maybe art history are engraved on the body and flesh of men....."

The work of Rustin is relatively unknown. Until the late 1960s, his abstract painting had a large following in France. However, while most European and American artists were widening the gap between themselves and the figurative traditions that preceded Modernism, Rustin started to swim against the current, a decision which cost him dearly in the short term.

== Personal exhibits ==
- 1959 -1969 : Galerie La Roue, Paris, France
- 1980-1986 : Galerie Isy Brachot, Paris, France
- 1986-1993 : Galerie Marnix Neerman, Bruges, Belgium
- Since 1993 : Rustin Foundation, Antwerp, Belgium
- 1971 : ARC, Musée d'Art Moderne de la Ville de Paris, France, Catalogue
- 1982 : Maison des Arts André Malraux, Créteil, Paris, France, Catalogue
- 1994 : Städlische Galerie und Ludwig Institut, Schloss Oberhausen, Germany
- MAC, Sâo Paulo, Brazil Markiezenhof, Bergen op Zoom, the Netherlands, Catalogue
- 1996 The Delfino Studio Trust, London
- Museum of Contemporary Art, University of São Paulo, Brazil
- 1997 Museo de Arte Contemporaneo de la Universidade de Chile, Santiago, Chile
- 2000 Veranneman Foundation, Brussels, Belgium, and Frissiras Museum, Athens, Greece
- 2001 Halle Saint-Pierre and Galerie Marie Vitoux, Paris, France

== Works in public collections ==
- Algeria: Musée National des Beaux-Arts, El Hamma
- Germany: Hamburger Kunsthalle
- Städtische Galerie et Ludwig Institut, Schloss Oberhausen
- England: British Museum, London
- Fitzwilliam Museum, Cambridge
- Museum and Art Gallery, Birmingham
- Brazil: Museum of Contemporary Art, University of São Paulo
- Chile: Museo de la Solidaridad Salvador Allende, Santiago
- Spain: Museu Nacional d'Art de Catalunya, Barcelona
- USA: Art Museum, Princeton University
- Hirshhorn Museum and Sculpture Garden
- Smithsonian Institution, Washington
- The New Orleans Museum of Art
- France: Centre National d'Art Contemporain, Paris
- Fond Régional d'Art Contemporain de Seine-Saint-Denis
- Fond Régional d'Art Contemporain, Rhône-Alpes
- Fond Régional d'Art Contemporain du Val-de-Marne
- Musée d'Art Moderne de la Ville de Paris

== Monographs ==
- Rustin, Entretiens avec Michel Troche, textes de Bernard Noël et Marc Le Bot, Editions de l’Equinoxe, Paris, 1984.
- Edward Lucie-Smith, Rustin, London, 1991.
- Agnès Meray, Regards sur l'Œuvre de Jean Rustin, Thèse, Université de Paris I, 1992.
- Revue Enfers, Jean Rustin, April 1996, textes de Claude Roffat, Pascal Quignard, Agnès Meray, Jean Clair, Françoise Ascal, Edition Pleine Marge, Paris.
