= Alexej von Jawlensky =

Russian-born German painter (1864–1941)

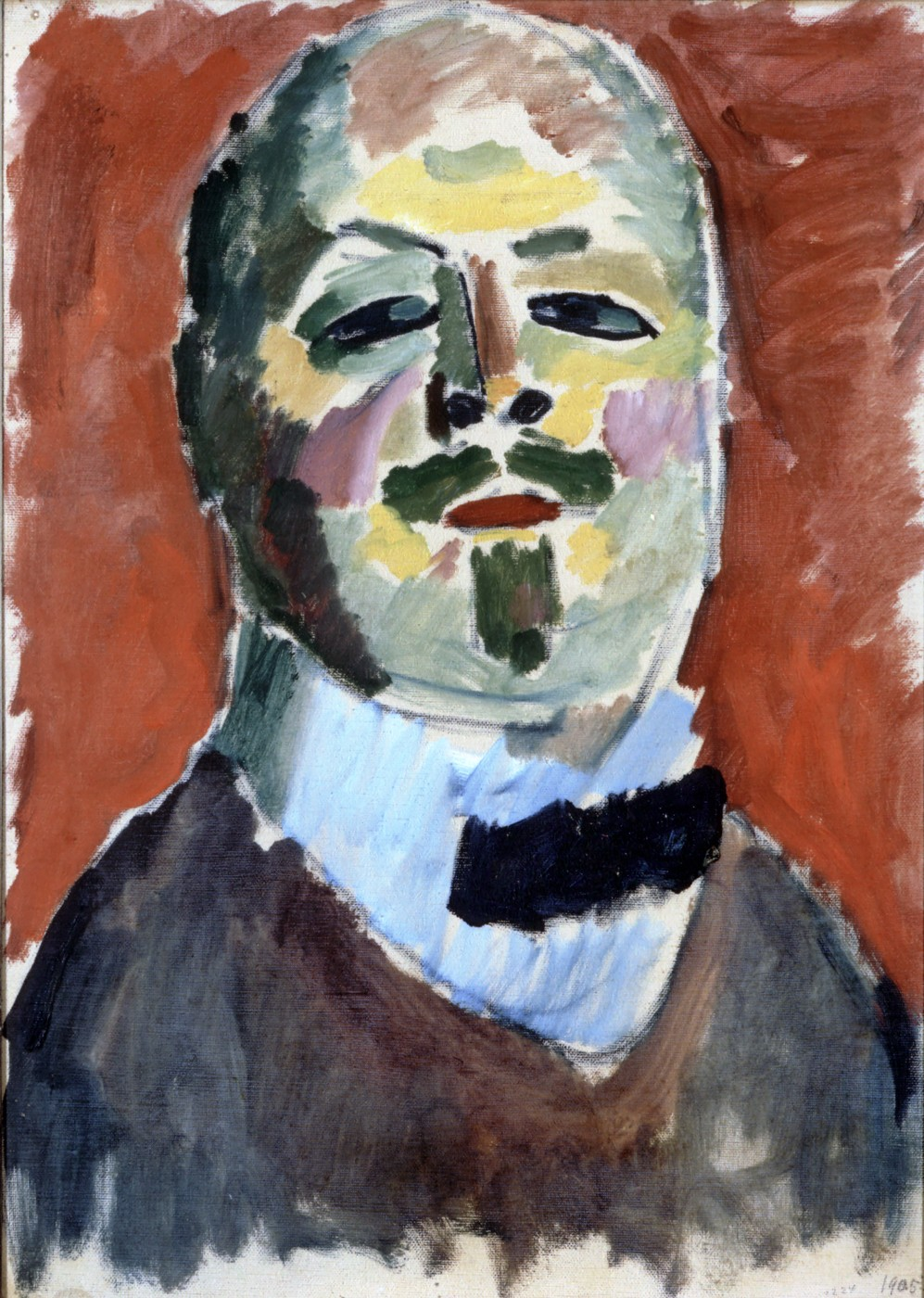
- Self-portrait, 1905
- Born: Alexej Georgewitsch von Jawlensky; 13 March 1864; Torzhok, Russia
- Died: 15 March 1941 (aged 77); Wiesbaden, Germany
- Citizenship: Russia; Germany (since 1934)
- Known for: Painting
- Spouse: Helene Nesnakomoff (m. 1922)
- Children: Andreas Jawlensky

Signature
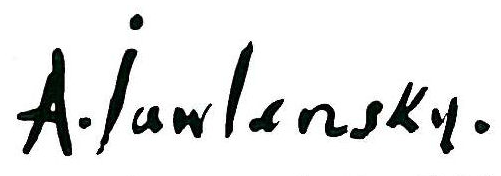

Alexej Georgewitsch von Jawlensky (Russian: Алексе́й Гео́ргиевич Явле́нский, romanized: Alekséy Geórgiyevich Yavlénskiy; 13 March 1864 – 15 March 1941), surname also spelt as Yavlensky, was a Russian expressionist painter active in Germany. He was a key member of the New Munich Artist's Association (Neue Künstlervereinigung München), Der Blaue Reiter ("The Blue Rider") group, and later Die Blaue Vier ("The Blue Four").

== Career ==
Alexej von Jawlensky was born on 13 March 1864, in Torzhok, a town in Tver Governorate, Russia, as the fifth child of Georgi von Jawlensky and his wife Alexandra (née Medwedewa). At the age of ten he moved with his family to Moscow. After a few years of military training, he became interested in painting while visiting the All-Russia Exhibition 1882 in Moscow. Only because of his good social connections, he managed to get himself posted to Saint Petersburg and, from 1889 to 1896, studied at the art academy there, while also discharging his military duties. Jawlensky gained admittance to the circle of the renowned Russian realist painter Ilya Repin. There he met Marianne von Werefkin, a wealthy artist and former student of Repin. He requested that Werefkin be his mentor, and Werefkin decided to put her work on hold to promote his work and provide him with a comfortable lifestyle.

Jawlensky and Werefkin moved to Munich in 1894, where he studied in the private school of Anton Ažbe. In 1905 Jawlensky visited Ferdinand Hodler, and two years later he began his long friendship with Jan Verkade and met Paul Sérusier. Together, Verkade and Sérusier transmitted to Jawlensky both practical and theoretical elements of the work of the Nabis, and Synthetist principles of art. After considering not only modern French art, but also Vincent van Gogh and Kees van Dongen, Jawlensky in 1905 felt he had translated nature into color.

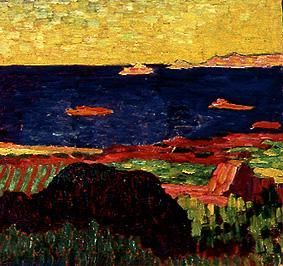
Painted between 1905 and 1906 Küste bei Caranteque

In Munich he met Wassily Kandinsky and various other Russian artists, and he contributed to the formation of the Neue Künstlervereinigung München. His work in this period was lush and richly coloured, but later moved towards abstraction and a simplified, formulaic style. Between 1908 and 1910 Jawlensky and Werefkin spent summers in the Bavarian Alps with Kandinsky and his companion, the painter Gabriele Münter. Here, through painting landscapes of their mountainous surroundings, they experimented with one another's techniques and discussed the theoretical bases of their art. Jawlensky painted the view of Murnau Village, a Bavarian town he visited in 1908 together with Werefkin and Kandinsky, with a line of red and brown roofs floating between a low blue mountain and a tide of yellow-green grass. Following a trip to the Baltic coast, and renewed contact with Henri Matisse in 1911 and Emil Nolde in 1912, Jawlensky turned increasingly to the expressive use of colour and form alone in his portraits.

External videos
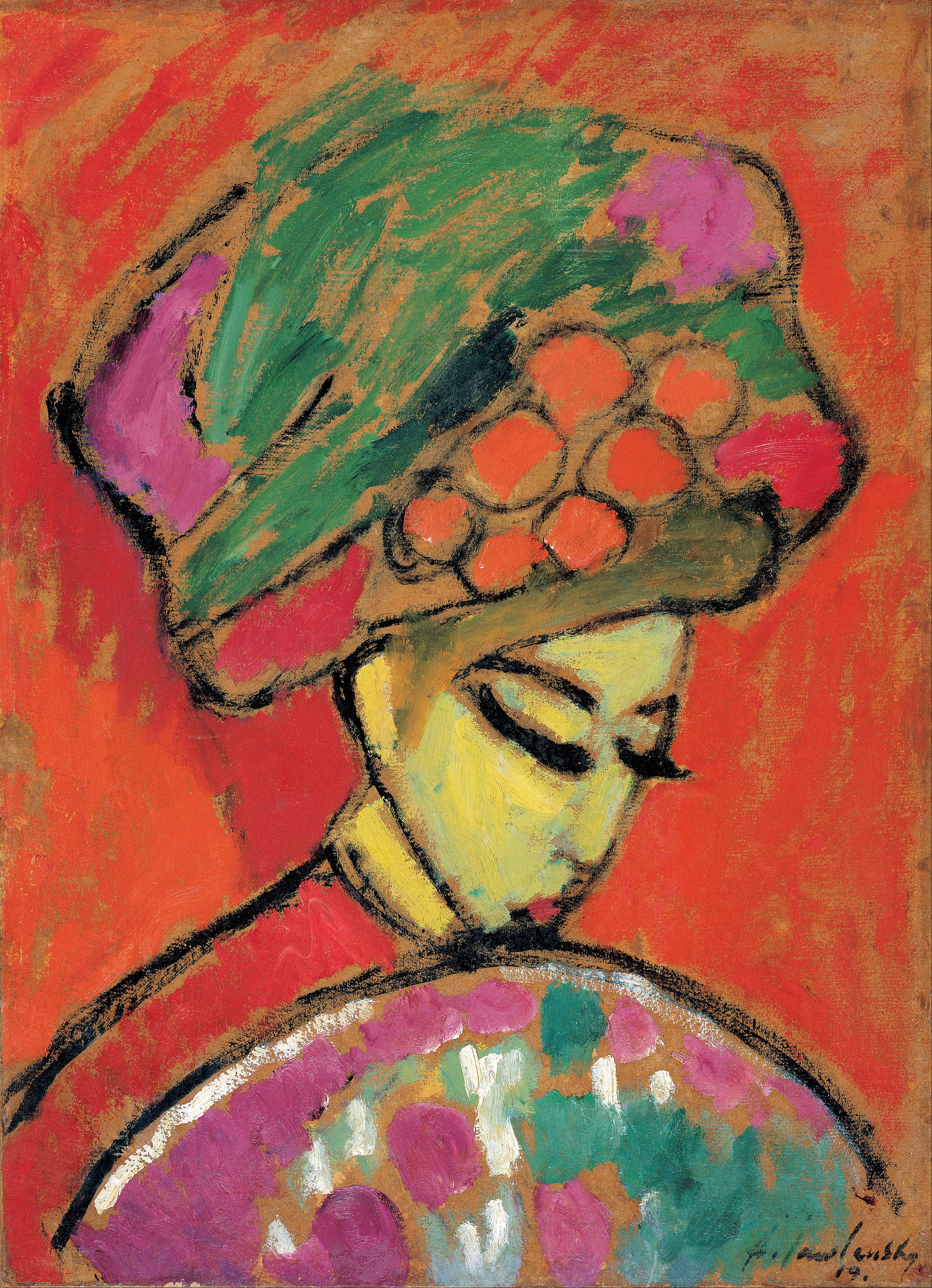
- Jawlensky's Young Girl in a Flowered Hat, Smarthistory

Expelled from Germany in 1914 due to World War I, he moved to Switzerland. He met Emmy Scheyer in 1916. Jawlensky gave her the affectionate nickname, Galka, a Russian word for jackdaw. She became another artist who abandoned her own work to champion his in the United States. After a hiatus in experimentation with the human form, Jawlensky produced perhaps his best-known series, the Mystical Heads (1917-1919), and the Saviour’s Faces (1918-1920), which are reminiscent of the traditional Russian Orthodox icons of his childhood.

In 1921, Alexej von Jawlensky returned to Germany and took up residence in Wiesbaden. There, in 1922, he married Werefkin's former maid Hélène Nesnakomoff, the mother of his only son, Andreas Jawlensky, who was born before their marriage (1902). In 1924 he established the Blue Four, whose works, thanks to Scheyer's tireless promotion, were jointly exhibited in Germany and the US. From 1929 Jawlensky suffered from progressively crippling arthritis, which necessitated a reduced scale and finally forced a cessation in his painting in 1937. He began to dictate his memoirs in 1938. He died in Wiesbaden, Germany, on 15 March 1941. He and his wife Helene are buried in the cemetery of St. Elizabeth's Church, Wiesbaden.

== Legacy ==
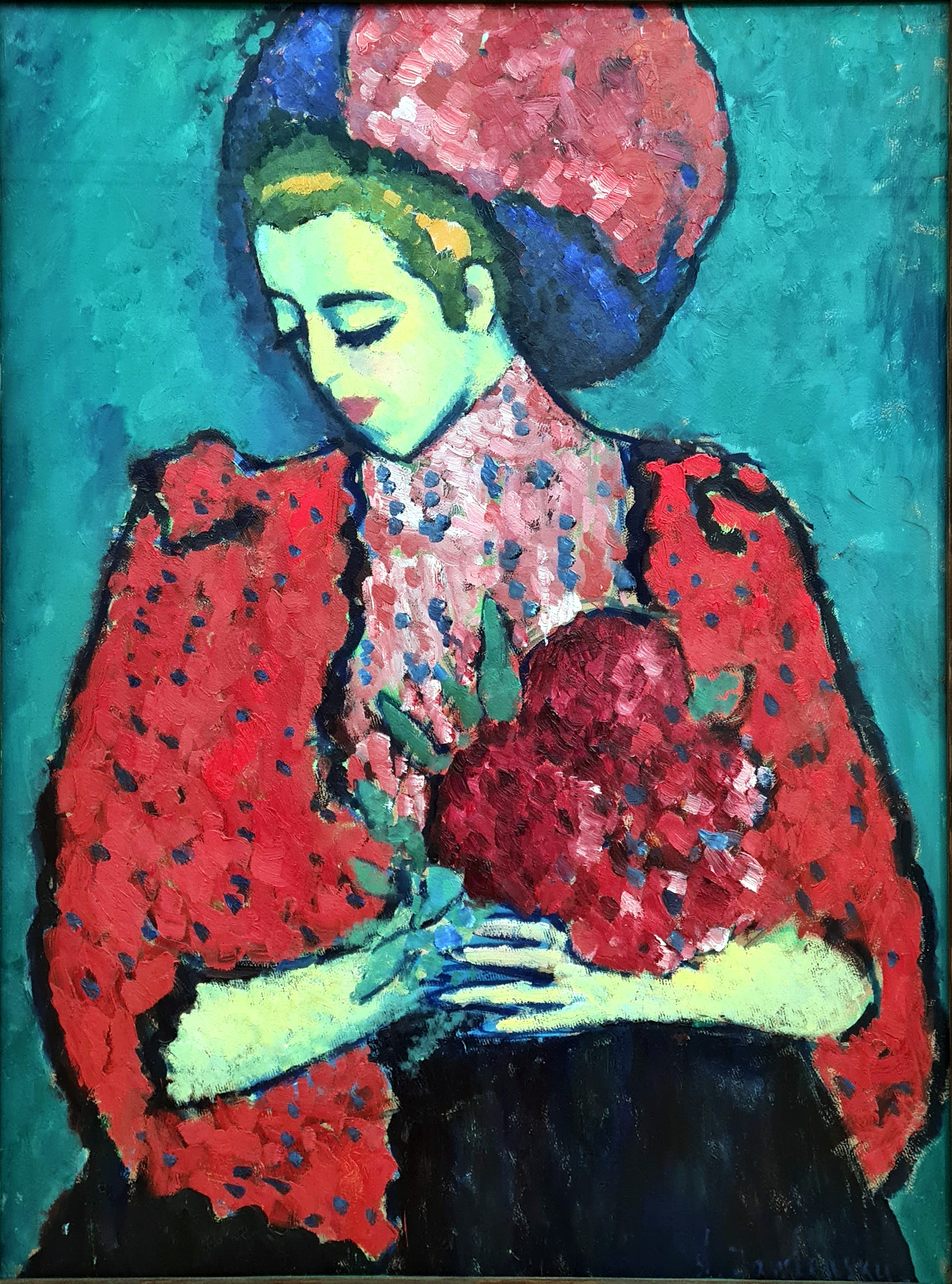
1909 Mädchen mit Pfingstrosen (Young Girl with Peonies)

In November 2003 his Schokko (Schokko mit Tellerhut) sold for US$9,296,000 and in February 2008 for GB£9,450,000 (US$18.43 million).

The 2006 album by the jazz group Acoustic Ladyland, Skinny Grin, features one of his works, Portrait of The Dancer Alexander Sacharoff, as its cover art.

The six CD's issued by CPO with the complete string quartets by the Polish composer Mieczysław Weinberg (1919–1996), and played by the Danel Quartet, all have a female portrait by von Jawlensky on their cover. Volume 1 shows "Frauenbildnis" (1909). Volume 2 has "Kind mit blauen Augen". Volume 3 has "Weiblicher Kopf" (1912). Volume 4 has "Mädchen mit Haube" (1910). Volume 5 has "Spanierin" (1911). And volume 6 shows "Kopf" (1912).

== Alexej of Jawlensky-Award ==
In remembrance of the artist, in 1991 the "Jawlensky Award" has been coined. Every five years it is being awarded to contemporary artists by the capital of the federal state of Hesse Wiesbaden, the Spielbank Wiesbaden and the Nassauische Sparkasse. The award is accompanied by a cash prize, an exhibition at the Museum Wiesbaden and the purchase of a work.

== Works ==
Paintings by von Jawlensky are displayed in galleries and museums around the world. The Museum Ostwall in Dortmund, Germany, maintains a collection of exceptional depth. The largest collection of works by von Jawlensky is kept at the Museum Wiesbaden, which owns more than 90 works of the artist, and forms the most important collection of his work in Europe.

=== Representative works ===
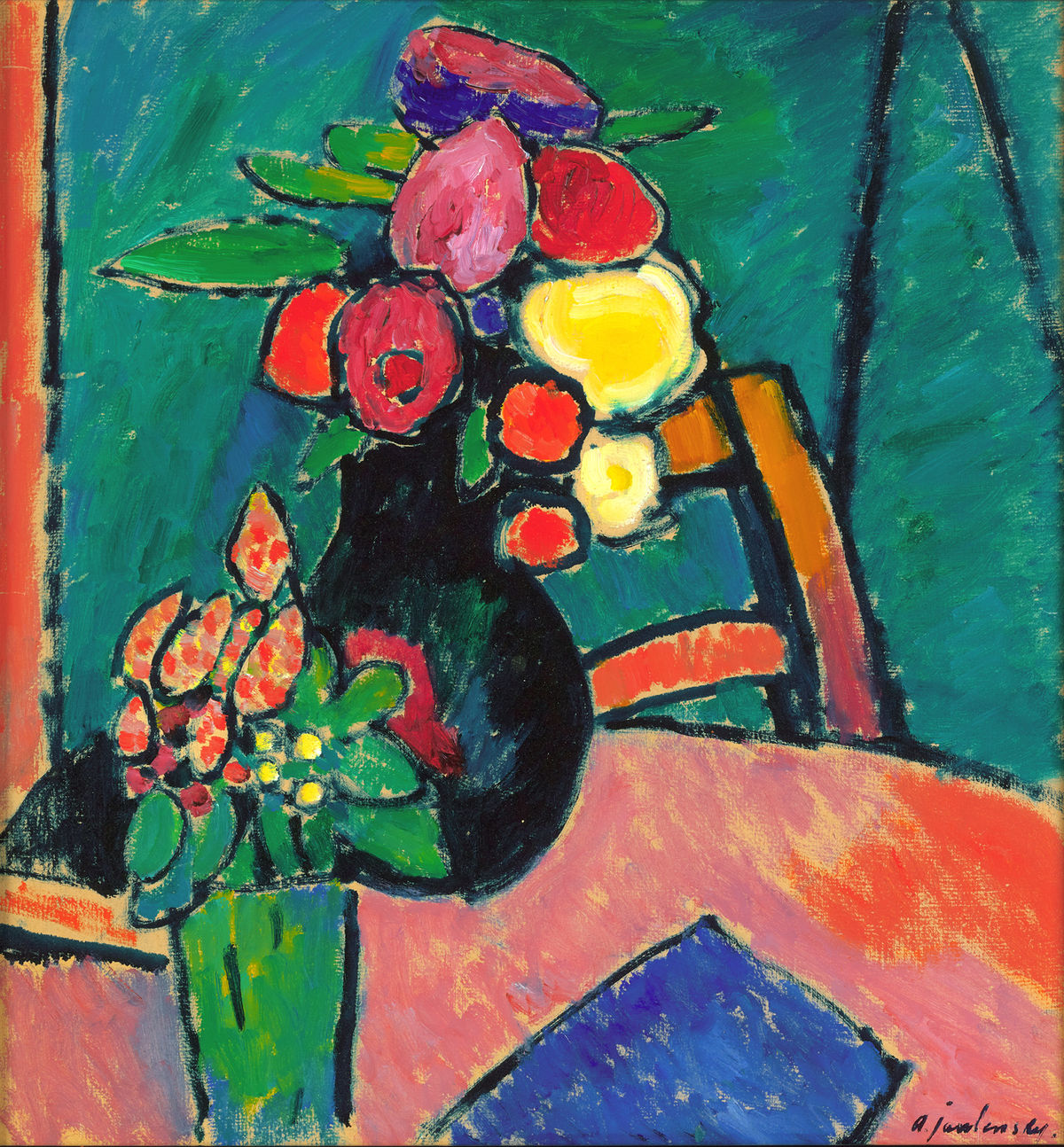
Blumenstilleben, 1908. Private collection.

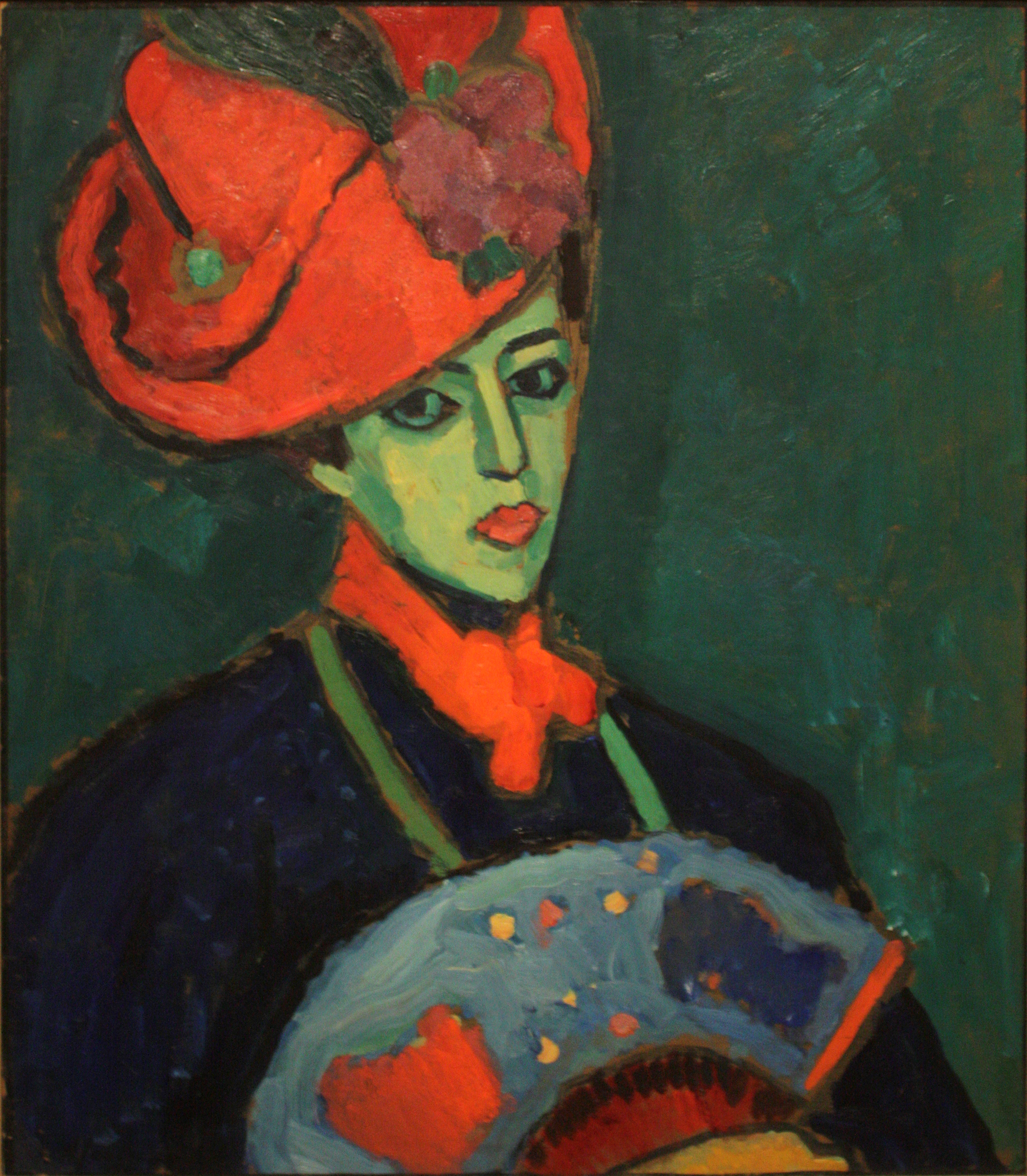
Schokko with Red Hat, 1909

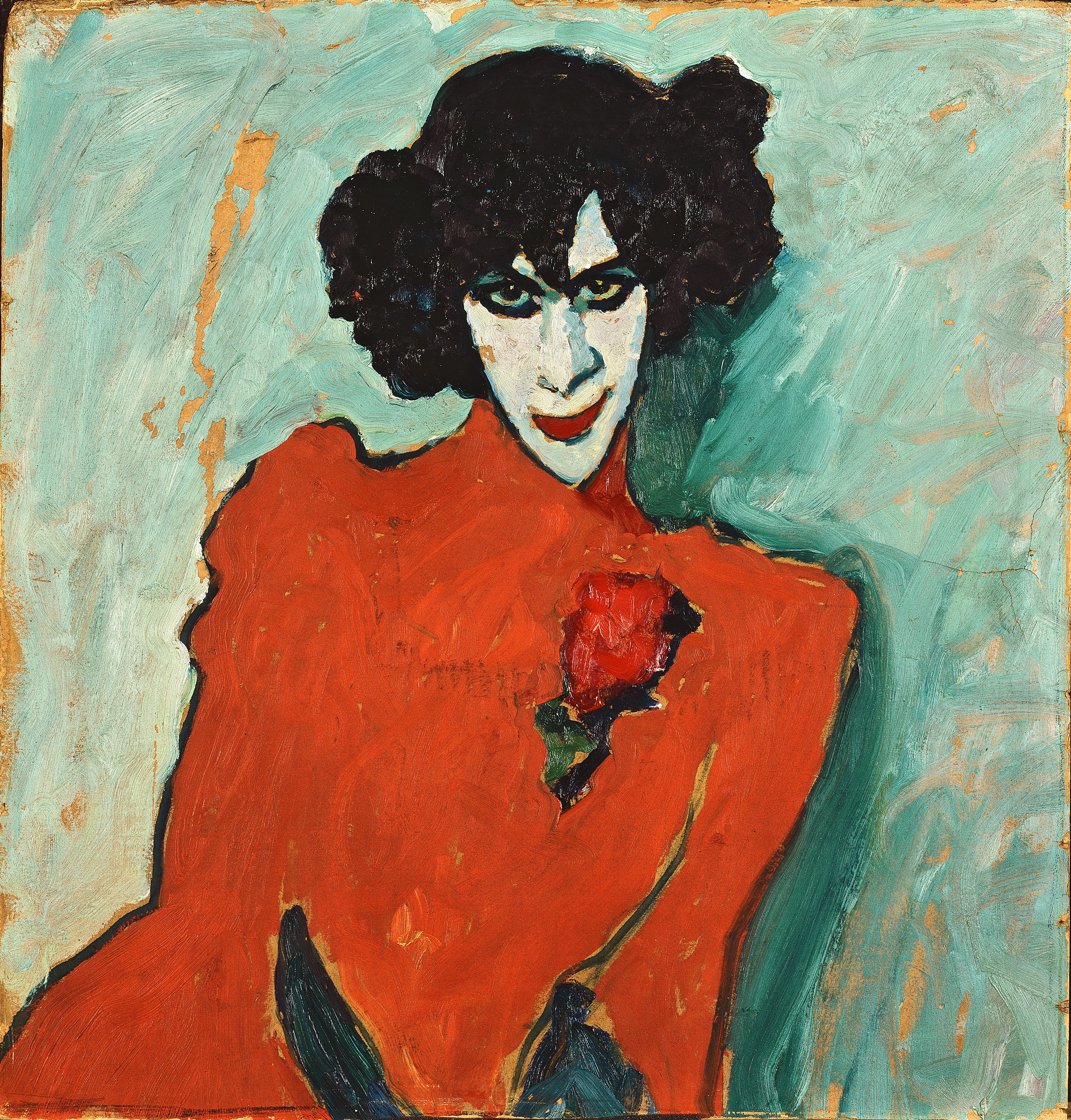
Portrait of Alexander Sakharoff, 1909

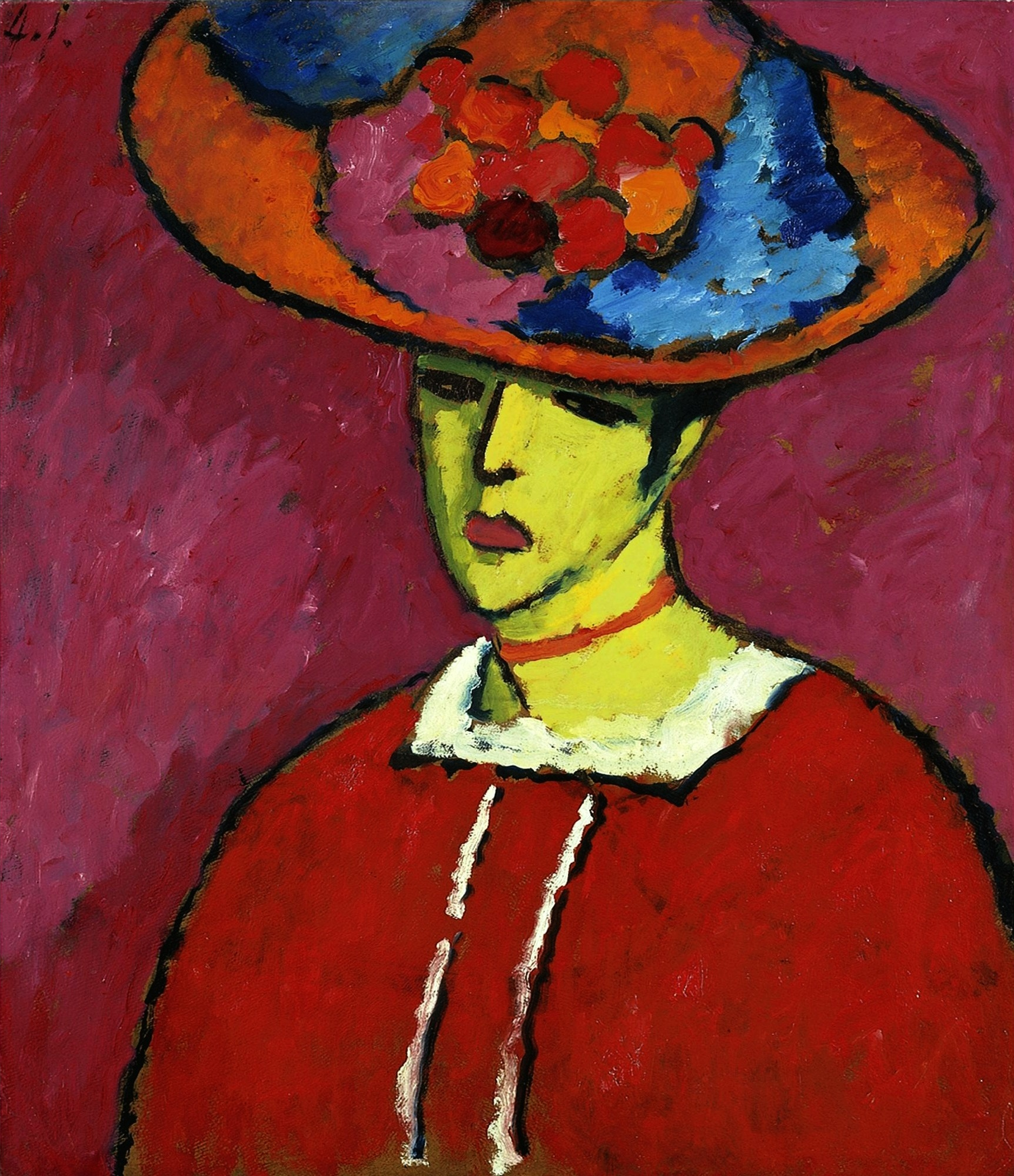
Schokko with Wide Brimmed Hat, 1910

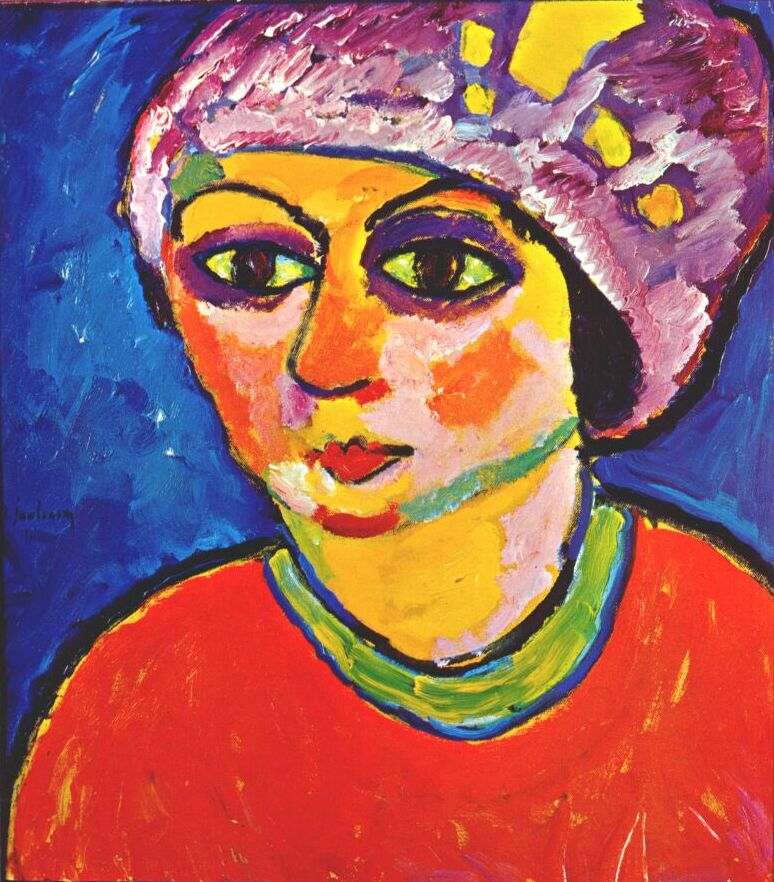
Violet Turban, 1911

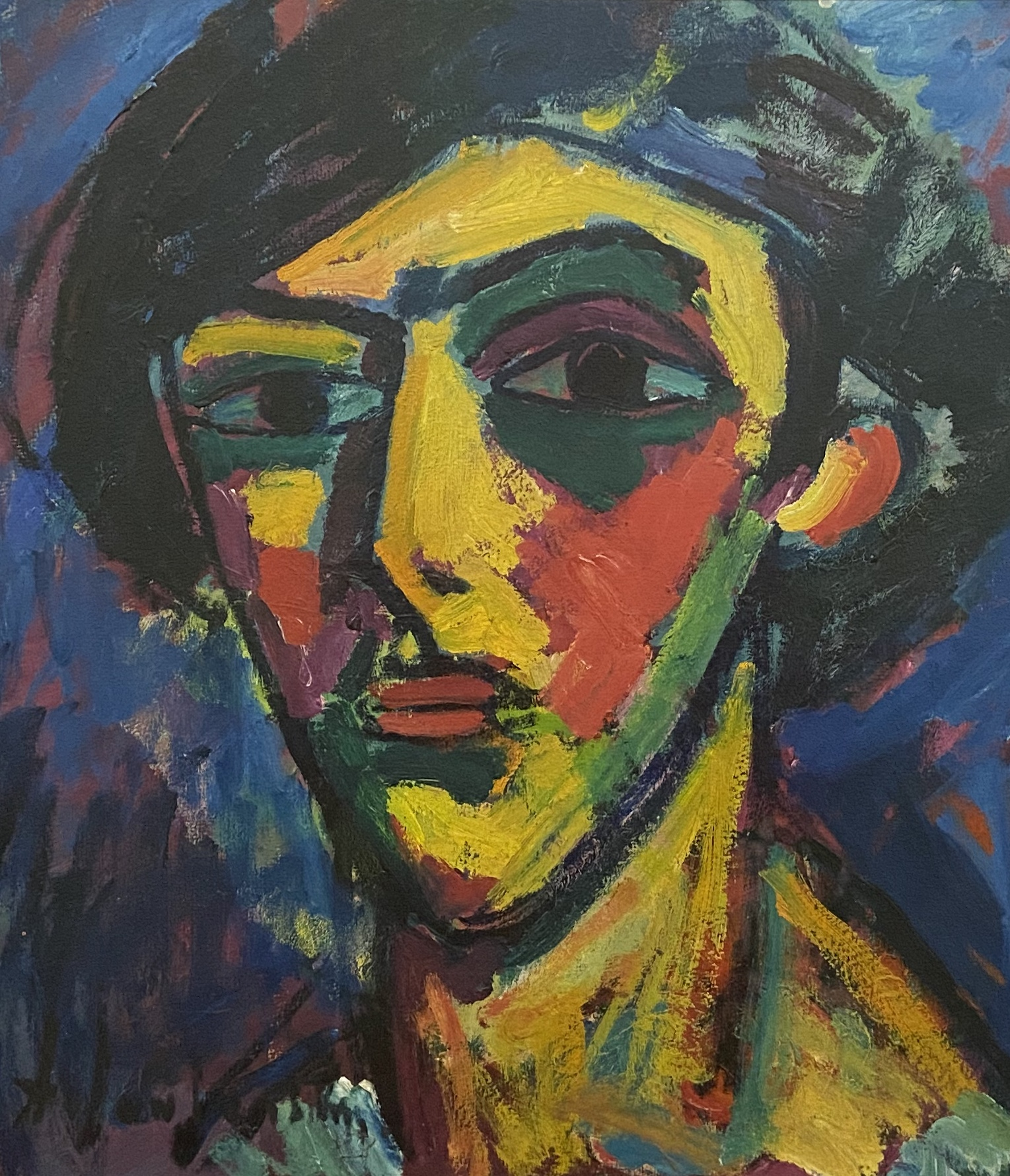
Head of a youth, 1911

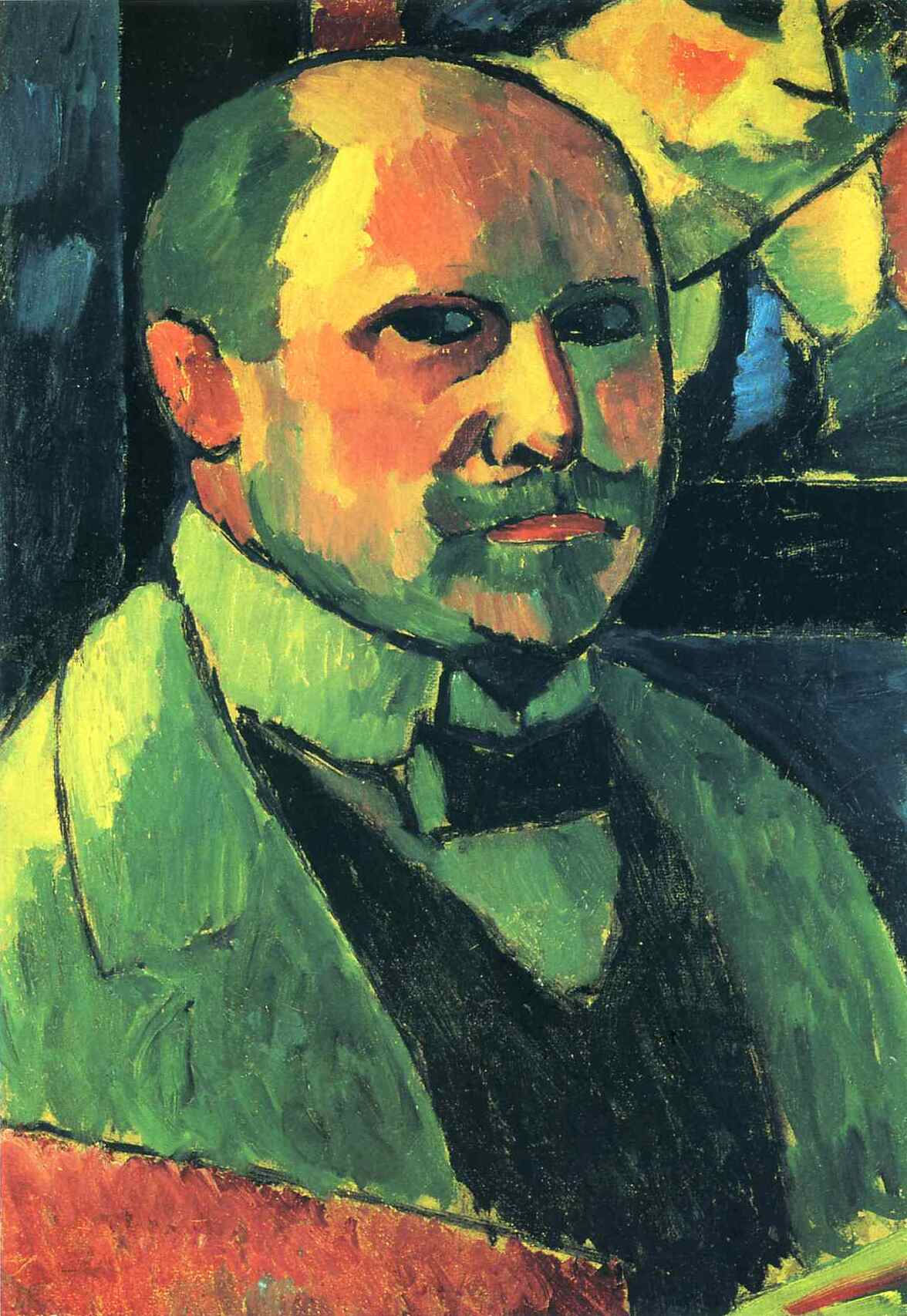
Self-Portrait, 1912

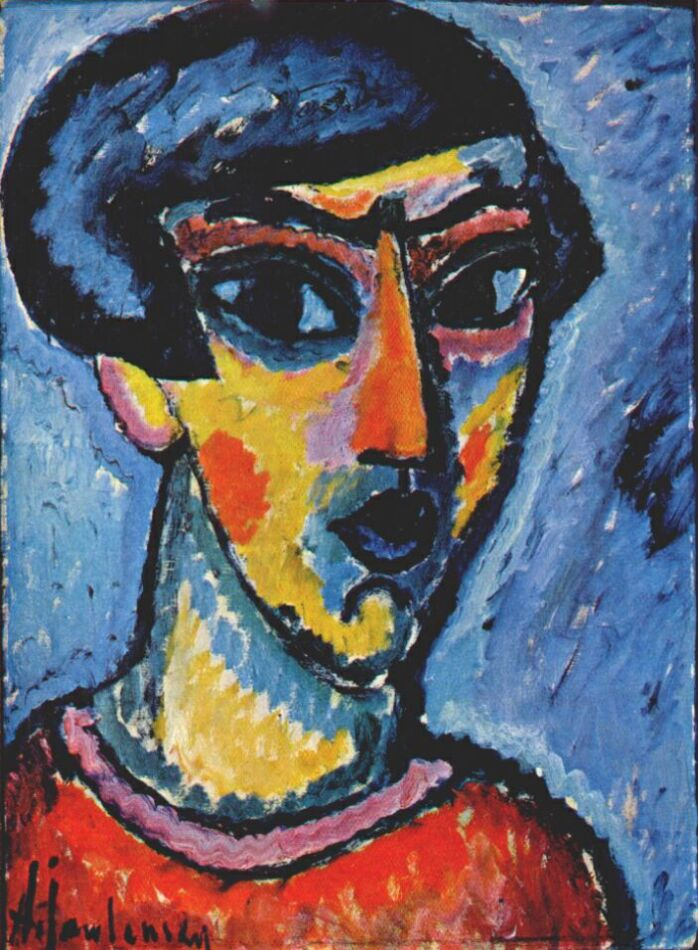
Head in Blue, 1912

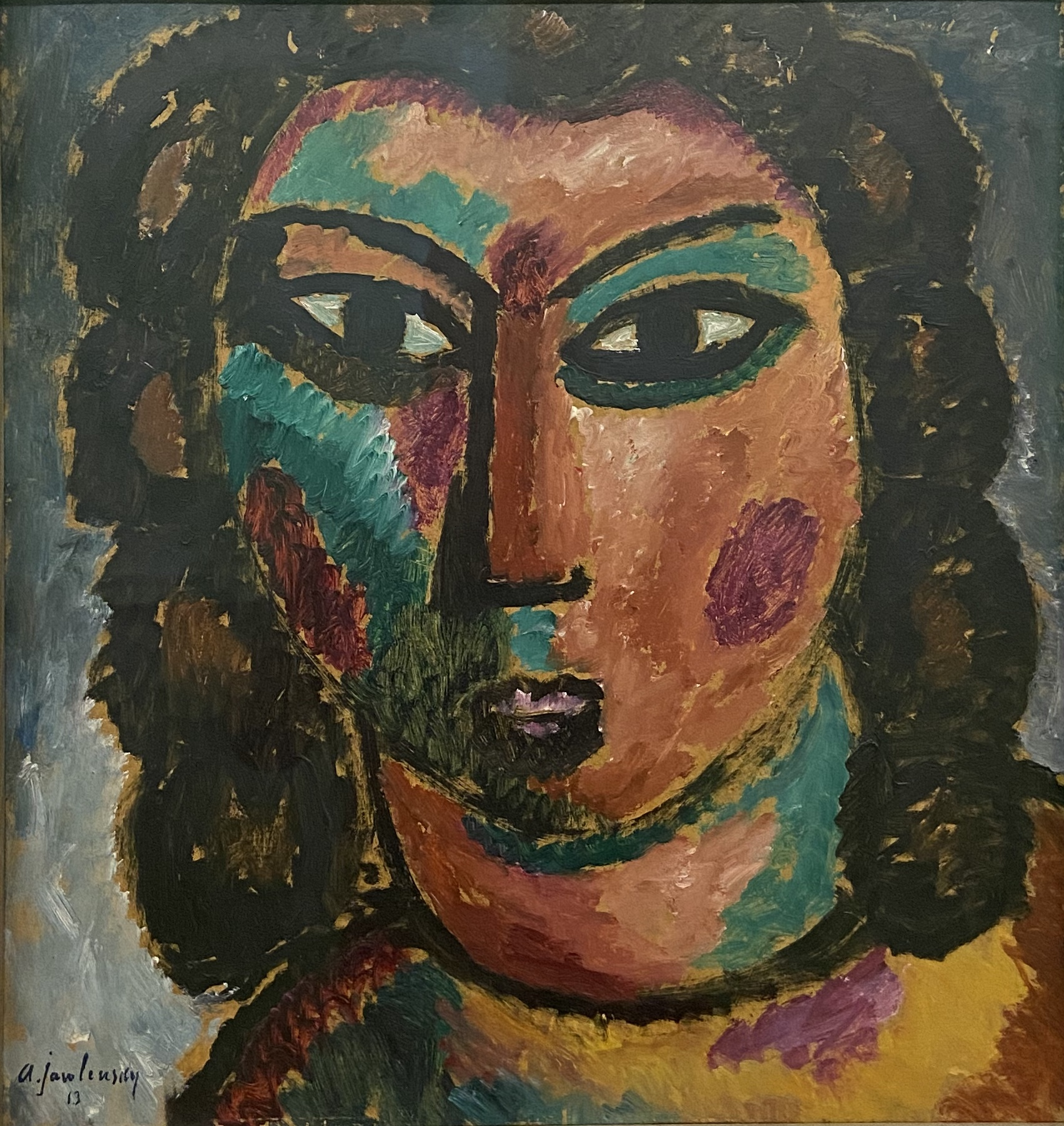
Brown curls, 1913

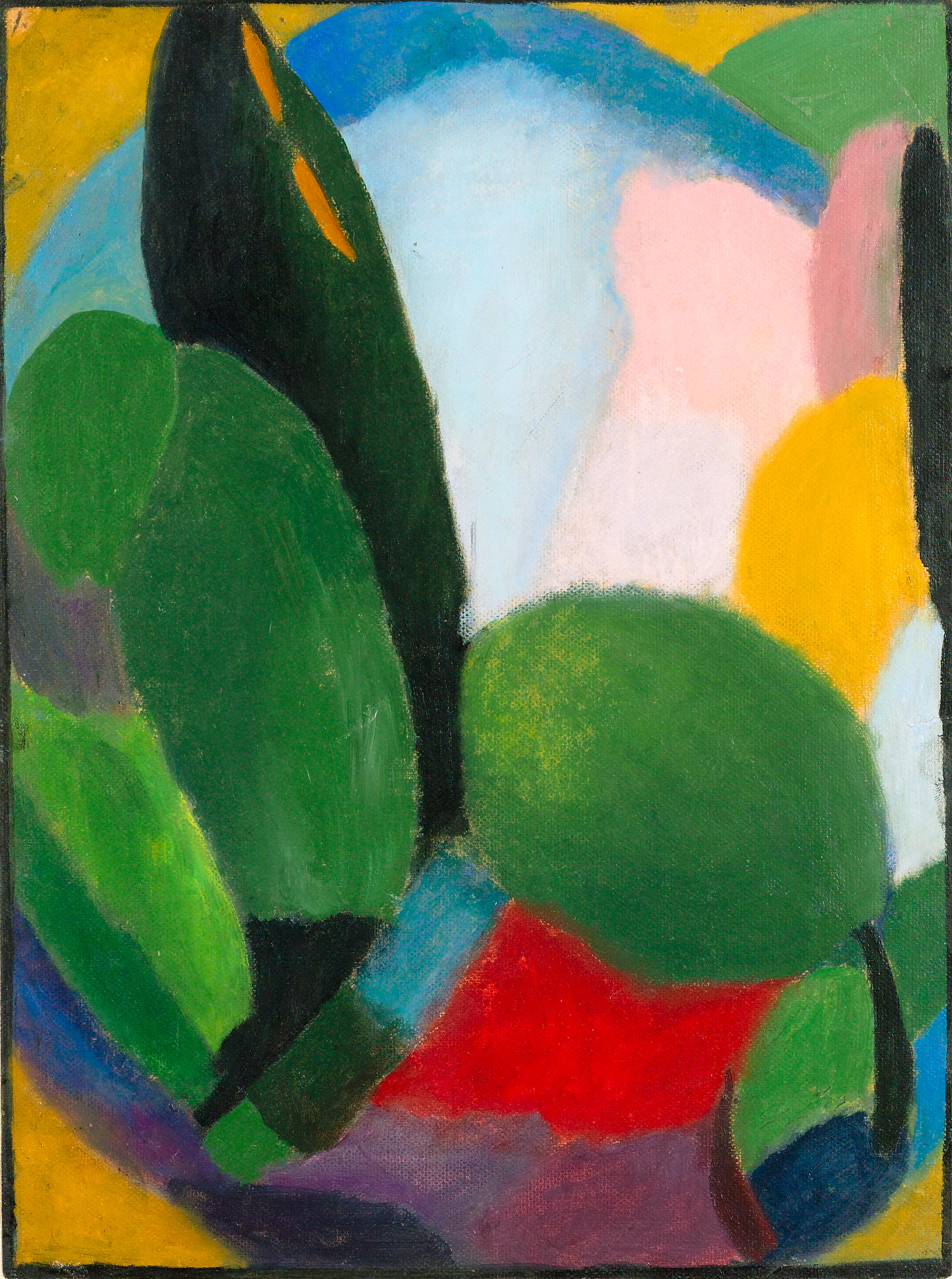
Variation, 1916

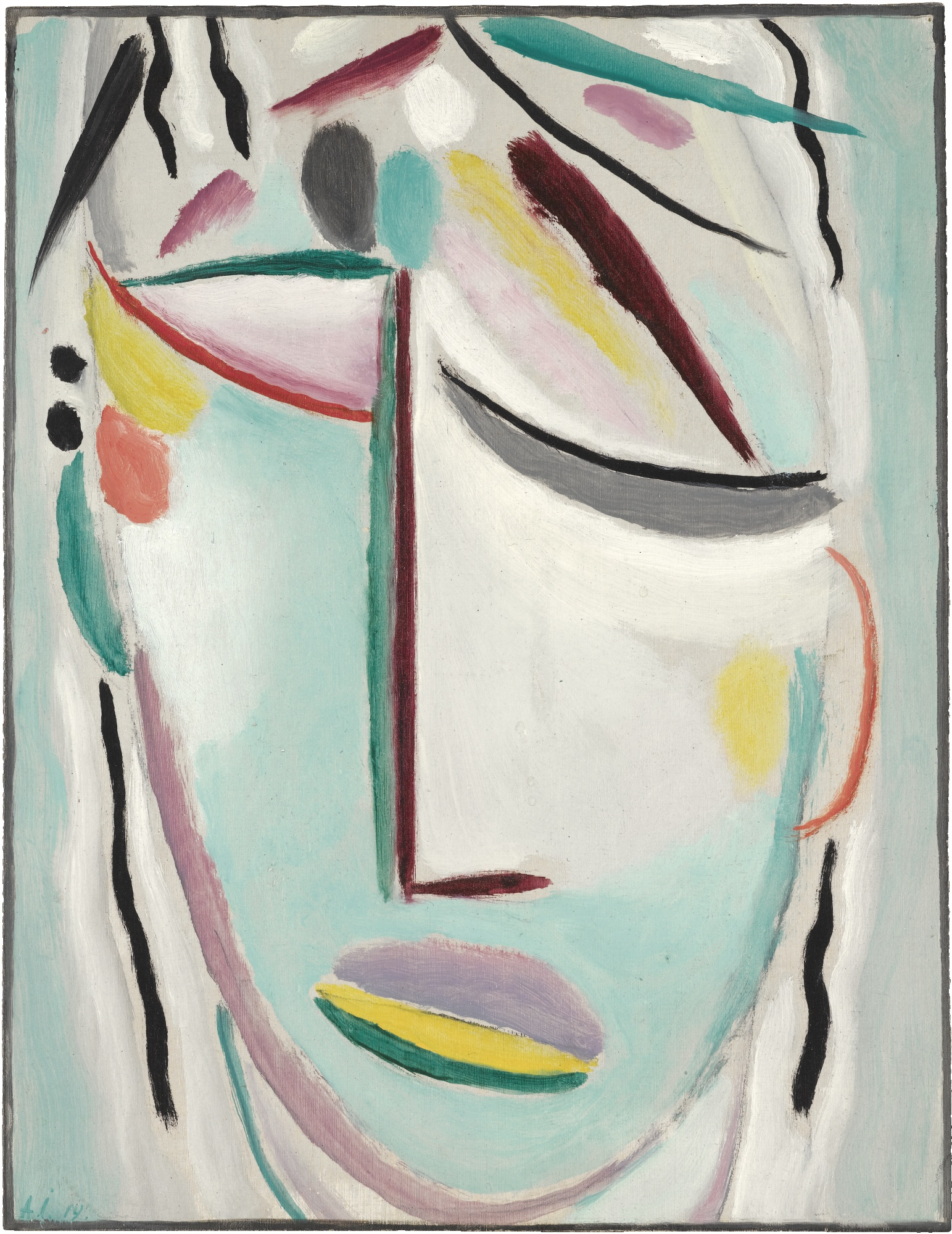
Savior's Face: Martyr, 1919

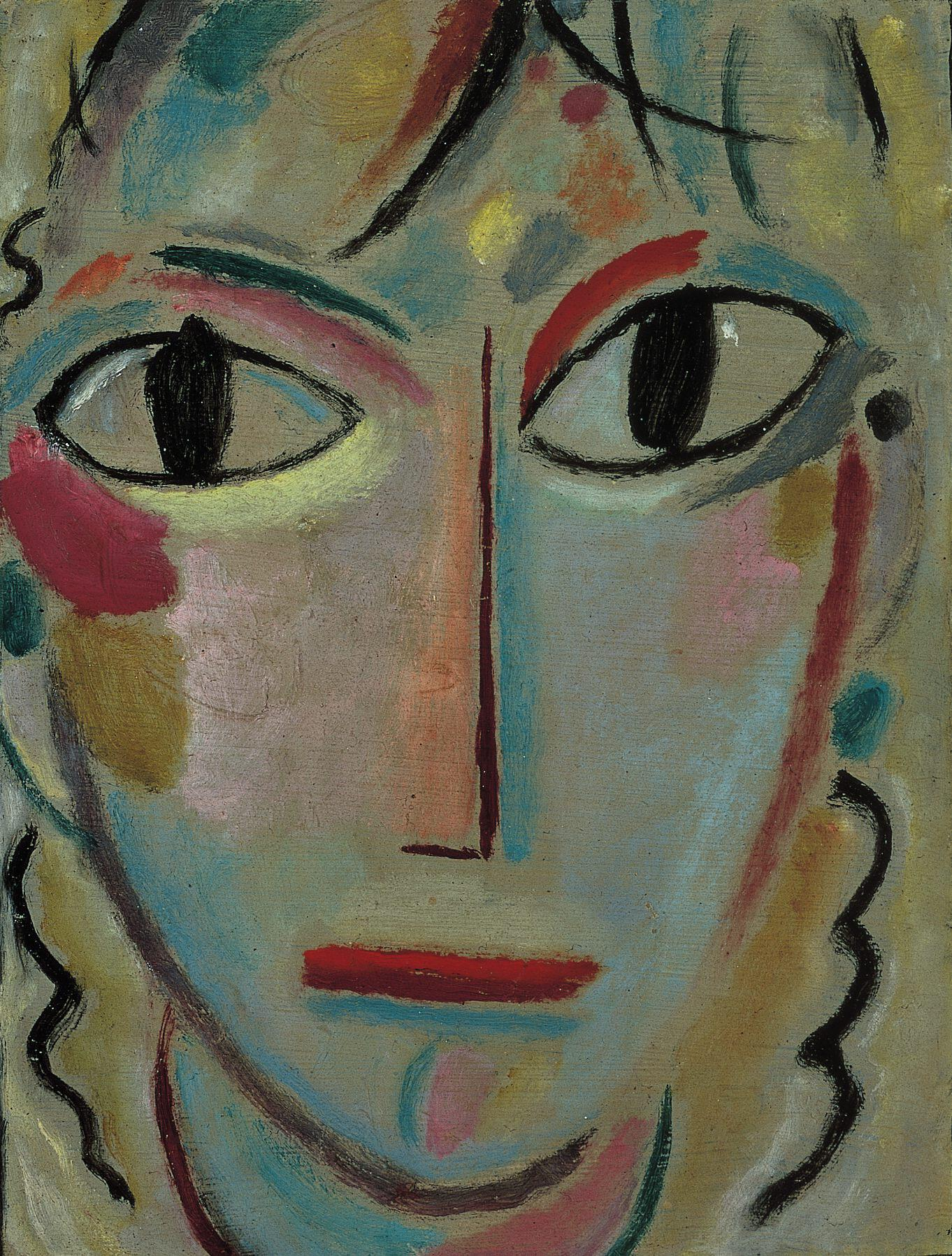
Astonishment, 1919, Norton Simon Museum, Pasadena, California

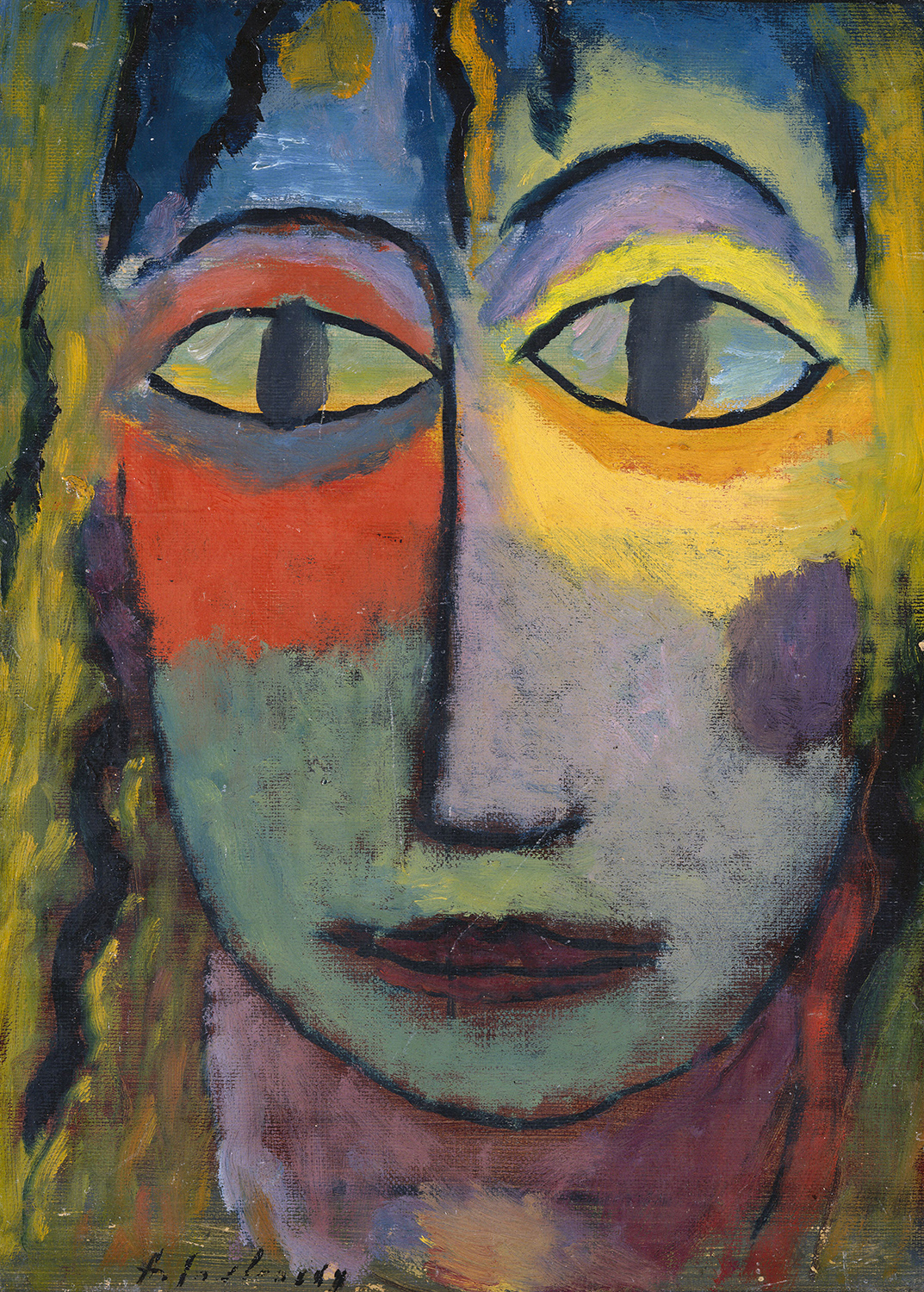
Medusa, 1923

== See also ==
- Abstract Head
