= John Chambers (artist) =

English painter (1852–1928)

- John Chambers, 1889
- Born: 9 January 1852; South Shields, England
- Died: 10 July 1928 (aged 76); North Shields, England

John Chambers (9 January 1852 – 10 July 1928) was a landscape, seascape and portrait painter in oil, tempera and watercolour, and an etcher and illustrator.

== Biography ==
Chambers was born in South Shields and educated at the town's Union British School, where the pupils were particularly encouraged to draw ships and other nautical subjects. He joined the Tyne Pilot Service on leaving school, but left before reaching manhood and decided to become an artist. Chambers enrolled at the Government School of Design in Newcastle upon Tyne and later went to study in Paris in the ateliers of Professors Gustave Boulanger and Jules Joseph Lefebvre, before settling at North Shields as a professional artist.

He first began exhibiting in 1877, showing several examples at the South Shields Fine Art & Industrial Exhibition. He followed this by showing his Partonhall and Harbour at the Central Exchange Art Gallery, Newcastle, in 1878 and was subsequently an exhibitor at the Arts Association Exhibition in Newcastle in 1879, 1881 and 1882 and the Gateshead Fine Art & Industrial Exhibition in 1883. In the following year he began an association with the exhibitions of the Newcastle Bewick Club which lasted just over a decade. In 1886, he sent his first of three works to the exhibitions of the Royal Institute of Painters in Water Colours, showing The Deserted Mill. Chambers mainly exhibited on Tyneside for the remainder of his career, including exhibitions at the art clubs of South Shields, where he was a vice-president, Tynemouth, and from their inception in 1905, the Artists of the Northern Counties exhibitions at the Laing Art Gallery in Newcastle upon Tyne.

Most of his work was executed in watercolour and predominantly featured nautical and landscape subjects. His most important work, however, was in oil and pictured the loss of HMS Victoria, which was accidentally sunk off Tripoli during manoeuvres in 1893. He had painted the vessel as it looked leaving the Tyne following its completion at Sir William Armstrong's Elswick Yard in 1888 and after its loss, spent a year preparing a 9 ft (2.7 m) × 12 ft (3.7 m) canvas which proved so successful an interpretation of the scene that an offer of £2000 was made for the picture, but was refused. It was exhibited all over Tyneside, and was also engraved.

Chambers maintained a succession of studios at North Shields where, at times, he directed painting classes, and at which he held exhibitions of his work, and occasionally those of fellow artists. It was also shown before being sold in large quantities by Bainbridge & Co., a North Shields auctioneers, and featured in several local loan exhibitions. Despite frequent favourable comments on his work, he remained a quiet, diffident artist who died at his home and studio at Borough Road, North Shields, without really extending his reputation beyond his native Northumbria, although he is reputed to have lectured on art in other parts of the country, was a regular visitor to the Berwickshire coastline, and had also worked in Holland. Although much of this reputation rested on his nautical and landscape paintings he also etched subjects for sale locally and was an occasional illustrator of Tyneside publications. Among his less typical works were a number of portraits in watercolour, among these one of Henry Hetherington Emmerson now in the possession of the Laing Art Gallery. He also produced a sketch of Emmerson for the menu card of the annual Bewick Club dinner in 1889.

Works
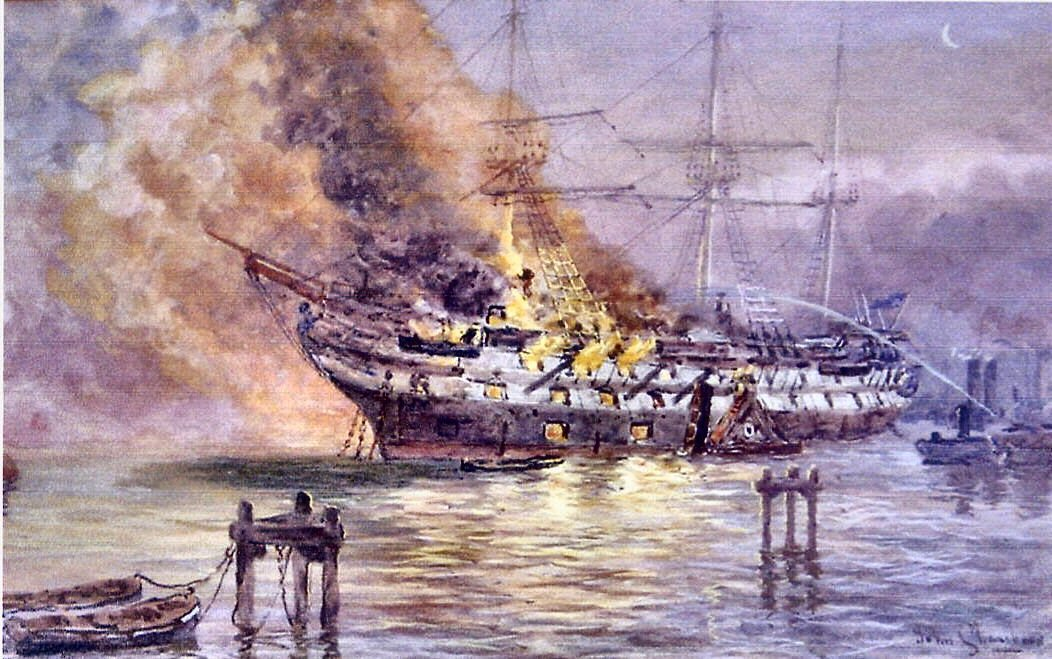
Burning of the Wellesley

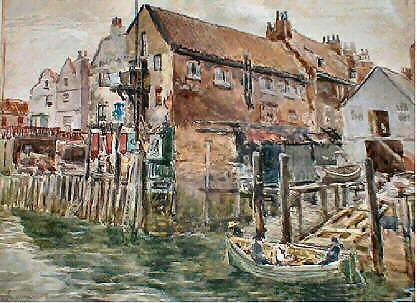
Old Houses, North Shields

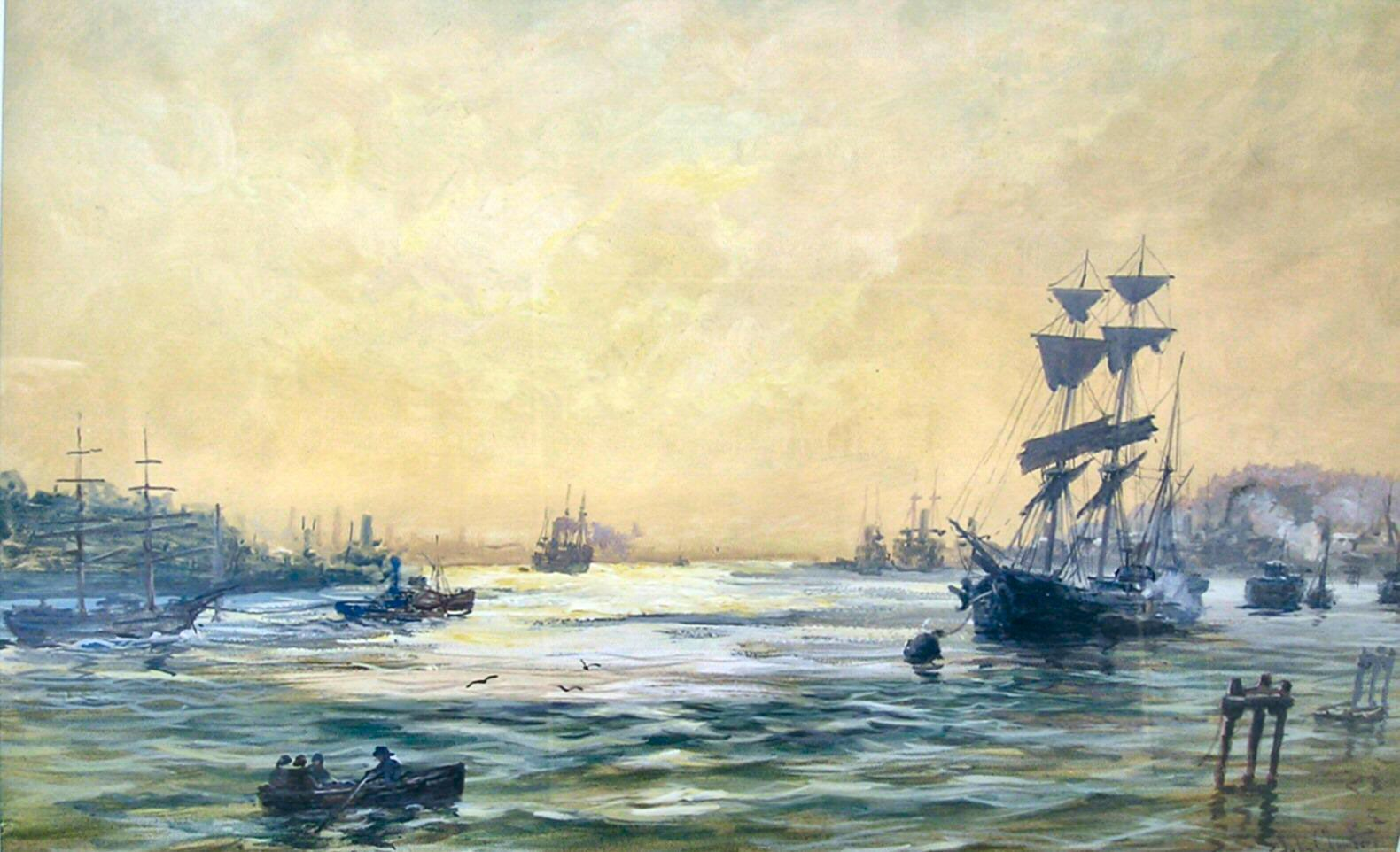
Up the River Tyne

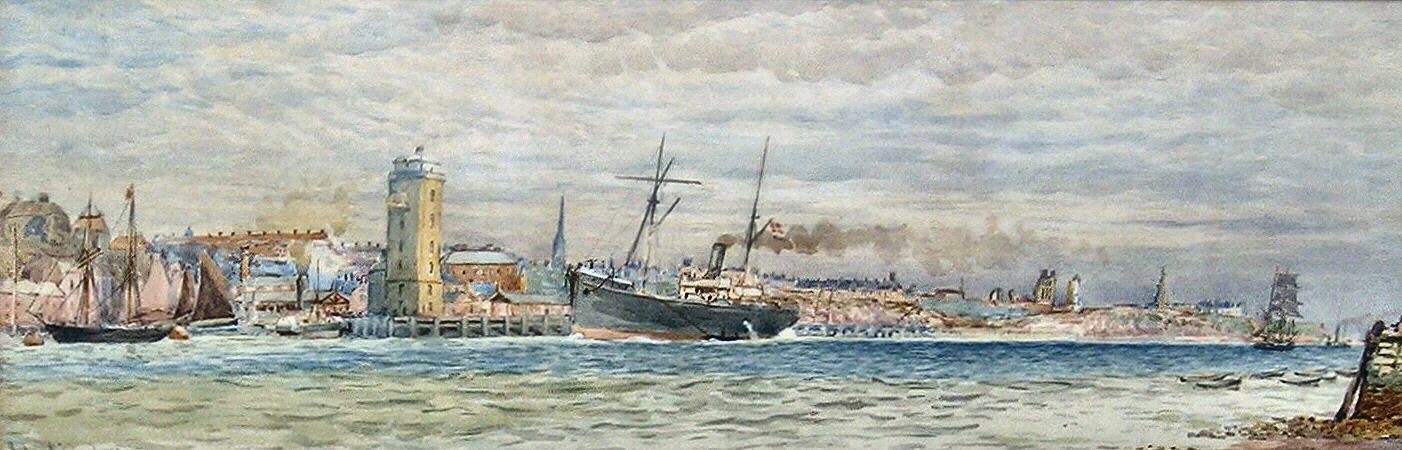
Steamer at North Shields

== Bibliography ==
- Newton, Laura; Gerdts, Abigail Booth (2003). Cullercoats - A North-East Colony of Artists. Bristol, England: Sansom & Company/Tyne and Wear Museums/Art Dictionaries Ltd. ISBN 1-904537-01-4.
- Hall, Marshall (2005). The Artists of Northumbria. Bristol, England: Art Dictionaries Ltd. ISBN 0-9532609-9-2.
