= East River Plaza =

Shopping mall in Manhattan, New York

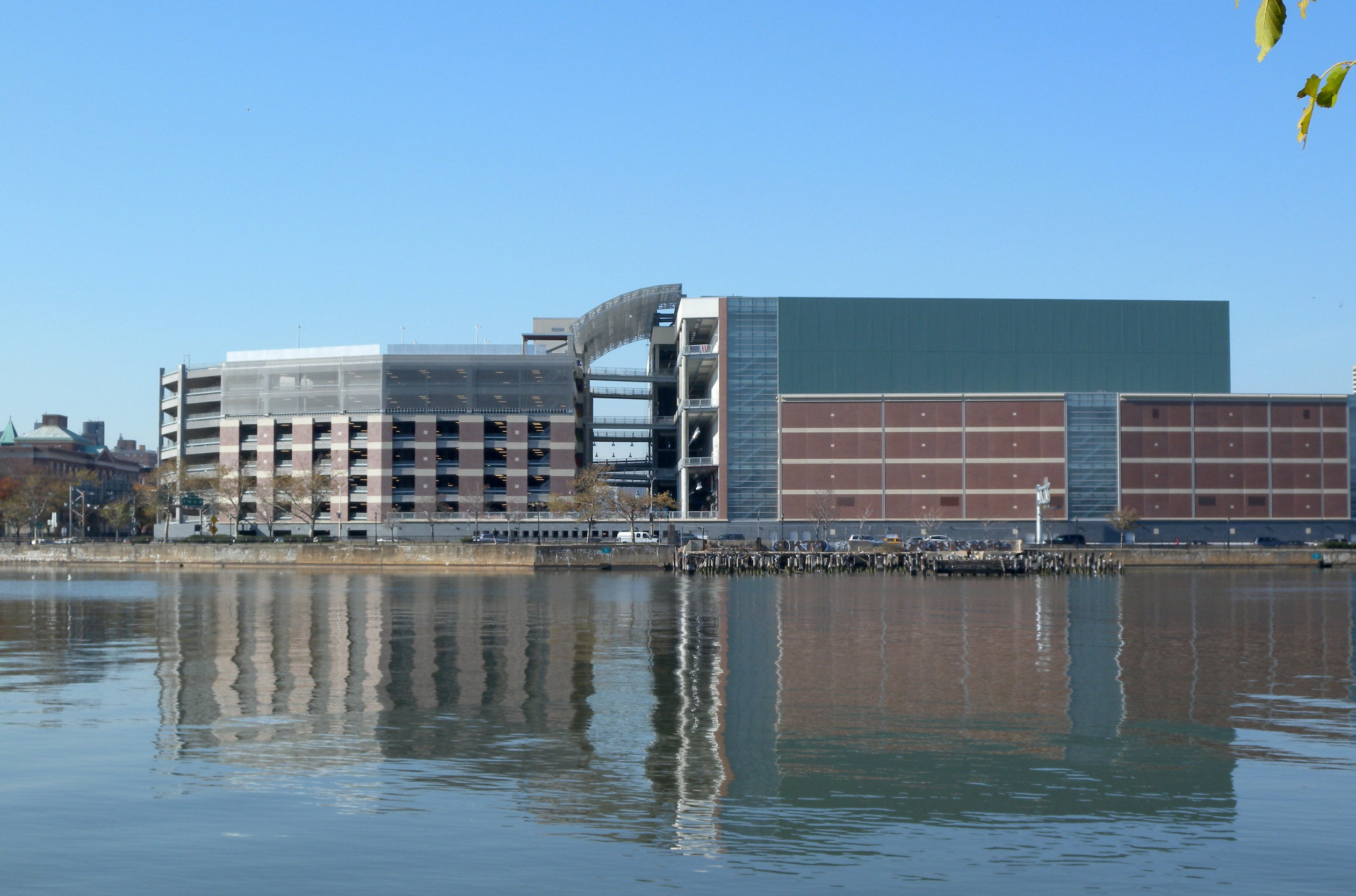
- Seen across Harlem River from Randalls Island
- Location: East Harlem, New York, New York, United States
- Coordinates: 40.795224°N 73.930753°W
- Opened: November 12, 2009
- Developer: Blumenfeld Development Group
- Owner: Blumenfeld Development Group
- Num. of stores: 9
- Num. of anchor tenants: 5
- Floor area: 527,000 sq ft (49,000 m^{2})
- Floors: 6
- Parking: 1,248 parking spaces
- Website: www.eastriverplaza.com

East River Plaza is a shopping mall located at FDR Drive near the Harlem River between East 116th to 119th Streets and also between Pleasant Avenue and the FDR Drive in East Harlem, New York City. Opened on November 12, 2009, after a protracted development process lasting 15 years, the mall has 7 stores with three anchor stores, 1 fitness gym, and two health clinics, which include Costco, Burlington Coat Factory, Marshalls, an ALDI supermarket, and a Planet Fitness. It has six levels and is attached to a parking garage.

== History ==
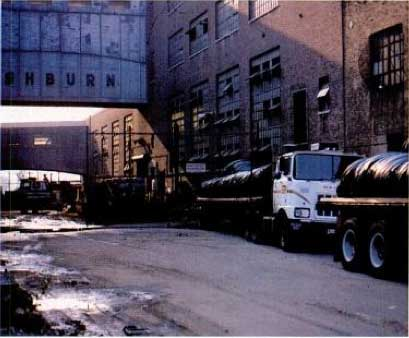
The Former Factory in 1979

Before this building was built, this was the site of the Washburn Wire Factory Complex. This factory was built in 1903 that included 6 buildings that make wire products. The company was founded by Ichabod Washburn. This factory itself was closed on 1976. It had employed up to 1,200 people at the time of its wire production peak. BDG purchased this site in 1996 and the Washburn Wire Factory was demolished to construct this shopping center, construction on which commenced in 2006, which opened November 2009. Upon completion, Costco was the first to open, followed by Best Buy, Bob's Discount Furniture, Marshalls, Old Navy, PetSmart (their first Manhattan location), and Target (also their first location in Manhattan) throughout 2010.

On April 14, 2012, Best Buy announced their store at East River Plaza would close by May due to restructuring of the company. The store closed by May 12.

In September 2011, reports of ALDI would open their first location in Manhattan at the East River Plaza. ALDI would open on October 1, 2012, helping expand the retail variety in the mall.

By January 2014, Burlington Coat Factory had opened in the recently vacated Best Buy space.

On April 4, 2020, after 10 years of being at the mall, PetSmart had closed their location, citing the inability to reach an agreement with the landlord on their lease.

By January 2021, Old Navy would permanently close their location at the mall.

In April of 2022, Ashley Furniture HomeStores announced a 10-year lease of the former Old Navy space to open by Fall 2022. The store would open in September 2022, however would recently close as of August 2026.

On September 26, 2023, Target announced 9 stores would close, including the location at East River Plaza. The main reason cited was due to continuous organized theft and vandalism throughout. Despite community-wide protest, with many arguing this would hurt many small businesses surrounding the mall, along with criticism thrown at Target for their approach towards the idea of shoplifting, Target would close their store on October 21, 2023.

== Criticism ==
Upon completion, many criticized East River Plaza due to the cost of parking in order to shop at Costco (which was the only tenant open by 2009), thus leading to poor sales by the end of the holiday season. The Developer (a partnership of Forest City Ratner & Blumenfeld Development), insisted the money was to pay off loans that financed the project.
