= George Ames Aldrich =

American painter

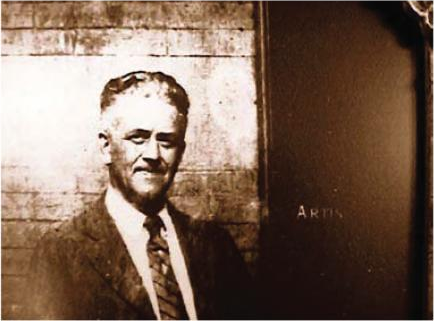
- Aldrich in South Bend, IN, ca. 1920
- Born: George Eugene Aldrich; June 3, 1872; Worcester, Massachusetts, U.S.
- Died: March 7, 1941 (aged 68); Chicago
- Education: Art Students League of New York

George Ames Aldrich was an American painter associated primarily with atmospheric landscape painting during the late 19th to early 20th century. Trained in both the United States and Europe, Aldrich developed a style characterized by tonal subtlety, atmospheric effects, and a restrained engagement with Impressionism. Known for his depictions of European villages, river scenes, American Midwestern landscapes, harbor views, and occasional urban subjects, he worked in a style that blended tonalism with impressionistic influences. His career was marked by extensive travel, steady exhibition activity, and a significant presence in Midwestern art circles.

== Early life and education ==
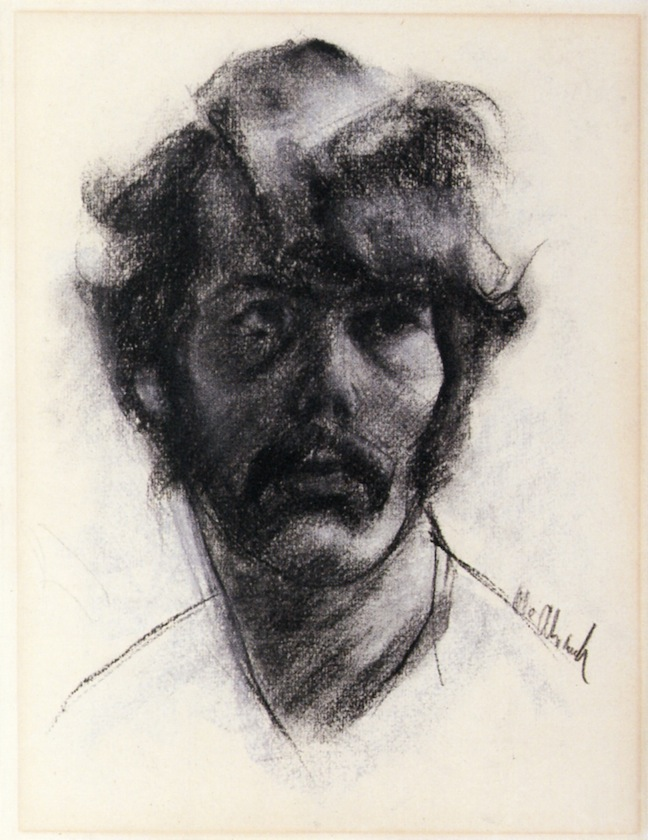
George Ames Aldrich, Me, ca. 1890s, Charcoal on paper, 14 3/8 in × 11 1/2 in (37 cm × 29 cm)

Aldrich was born as George Eugene Aldrich in Worcester, Massachusetts. Details of his early artistic training are not fully documented, but he pursued formal art study in Europe, where he trained in Paris and traveled through France, Germany, and England. These experiences shaped the aesthetic vocabulary that would characterize much of his mature work, particularly his interest in medieval architecture, narrow village streets, and atmospheric light effects.

Aldrich initially studied at the Art Students League of New York in the early 1890s before pursuing further training in Paris from around 1894 to 1900. His early career involved a nomadic lifestyle, working as an illustrator for periodicals, an etcher, a theatrical set designer, and even a dog breeder alongside his first wife, artist Eugenie Wehrle. Influenced by Norwegian impressionist Fritz Thaulow, Aldrich developed a signature style featuring bravura renderings of flowing water, stone architecture, and subtle light effects.

Aldrich's charcoal self-portrait was probably done during his early years in France. In it he portrays himself as a romantic figure, with shaggy hair, drooping mustache, and upturned gaze. It demonstrates his facility as a draftsman and command of portraiture.

== Career and artistic development ==
After returning to the United States, Aldrich established himself in Chicago and later in the artists' colony of South Bend, Indiana. He became known for paintings that depicted European locales, often inspired by his travels in Normandy and Brittany, as well as American landscapes rendered with a comparable sense of mood and structural solidity.

His work was frequently exhibited at major American art institutions during the 1910s–1930s, including the Art Institute of Chicago, the Pennsylvania Academy of the Fine Arts, and the National Academy of Design. Aldrich received numerous awards throughout his career, reflecting steady recognition within the academic and regional art communities of his time.

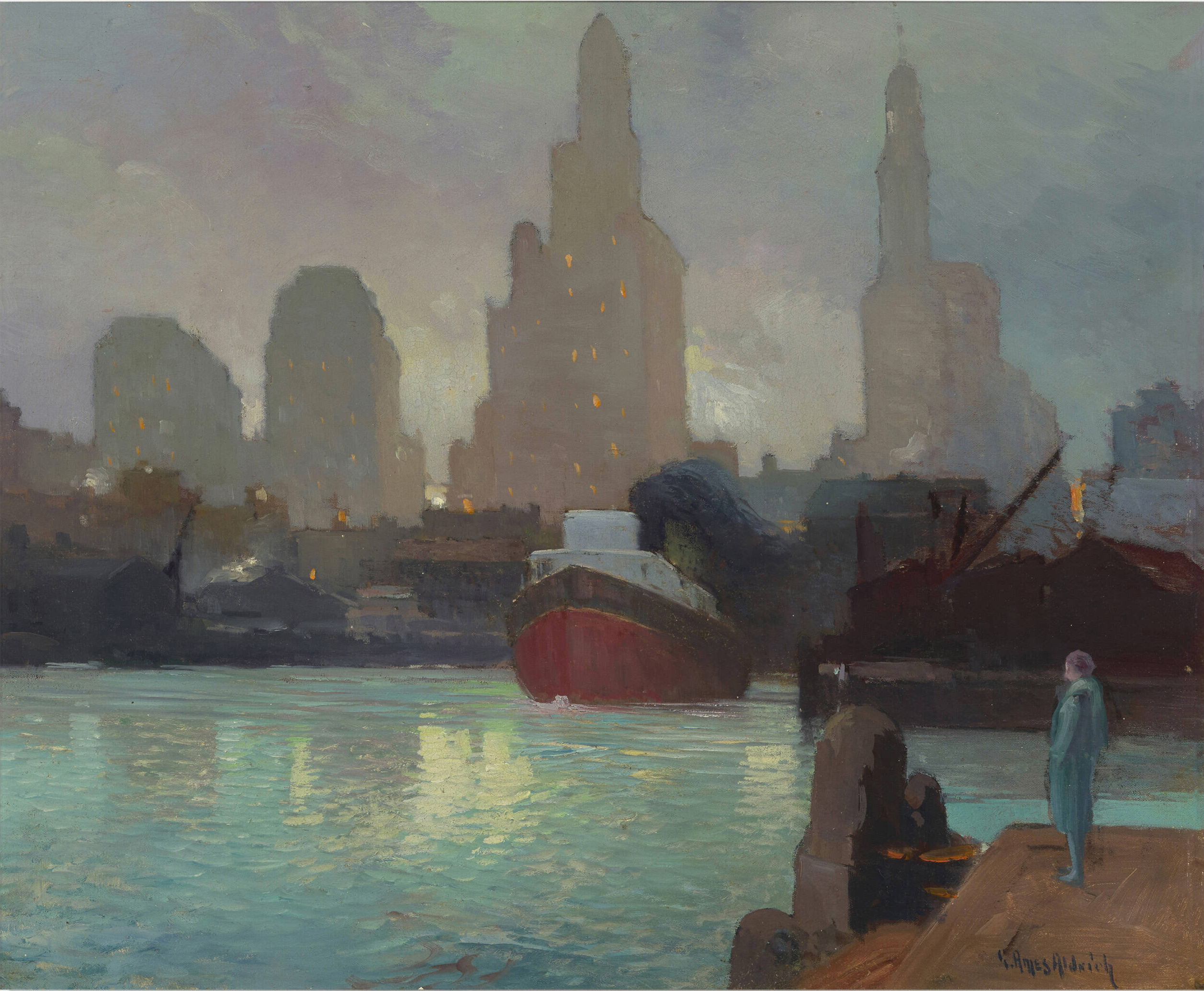
George Ames Aldrich, Chicago Skyline, (ca. 1927-1930), Oil on board, 20 1/8 × 24 1/2 inches (51 × 62 cm)

Aldrich settled on Chicago's South Side in 1917 with his wife and had four paintings in the Art Institute of Chicago's 22nd Annual Chicago & Vicinity exhibition in 1918.

The painting entitled Chicago Skyline presents an view of the Chicago cityscape and riverscape, composed from a vantage point that emphasizes the interplay of architectural forms against the river and sky. The skyline likely includes recognizable urban elements of the era—such as early skyscrapers which appear to be the Jeweler's Building and the Wrigley Building and waterfront structures—rendered in a painterly manner that balances structural delineation with atmospheric effects.

Aldrich's oeuvre includes:

- European landscapes and village scenes, particularly from France and Italy
- American rural landscapes, especially in the Midwest
- Harbor and waterfront views, including industrial elements
- Urban scenes, most notably views of Chicago

Across these subjects, Aldrich consistently emphasized atmosphere, weather, and time of day, often depicting dusk, overcast conditions, or softened daylight.

== Style and techniques ==
Aldrich's paintings typically feature a strong underlying compositional framework, often structured around stone buildings, bridges, waterways, and winding village streets. He favored subdued color palettes and atmospheric tonal harmonies, producing works that convey a sense of quietude and historical continuity. His brushwork ranges from controlled and descriptive to loosely impressionistic, depending on the subject and period.

Although not aligned with a single formal movement, Aldrich's art has been variously associated with American Impressionism, tonalism, and the broader tradition of early 20th-century American landscape painting. His European scenes in particular reflect a synthesis of Old World architectural study and a modern sensitivity to light and atmosphere.

== Exhibitions and recognition ==
During his lifetime, Aldrich exhibited widely in the United States. His work appeared in exhibitions at the Art Institute of Chicago and other regional and national venues. He was associated with professional artists' organizations and was regarded as a skilled and serious painter within established artistic circles.

Works by Aldrich are held in various public collections, including the Elks Club and the City Art Society in Sioux City, Iowa, the Elgin State Hospital in Chicago, the Decatur Art Museum in Illinois, the Museum of Fine Arts, Houston, Texas, the Union League Club of Chicago, Illinois, the Art Gallery of Ball State Teachers College in Muncie, Indiana, and the Oliver Hotel in South Bend, Indiana. The latter housed murals by him. Other works are located in the Museum of Art in Rouen, France.

George Aldrich exhibited his work in the United States and internationally, particularly within the Chicago art scene and at the Hoosier Salon.

Posthumously, his work has continued to appear in museum exhibitions, academic studies, and private collections. Retrospective exhibitions, particularly in Indiana and the Midwest, have contributed to renewed scholarly and curatorial interest in his career.

A recent exhibition of the artist's painting entitled, The Art of George Ames Aldrich, organized by The Brauer Museum of Art, Valparaiso University, Valparaiso, Indiana, curated by Wendy Greenhouse, Gregg Hertzlieb and Michael Wright, was held August 21 – November 16, 2012.

== Later life and legacy ==
George Ames Aldrich occupies a place within the tradition of American landscape painting shaped by European academic training and adapted to American subjects. He contributed to the continuity of tonal and atmospheric landscape painting in the United States during a period of significant artistic transition. His work provides insight into how American artists of his generation negotiated realism, Impressionism, and regional identity, particularly in the context of the Midwest and early twentieth-century urban growth.

Aldrich continued painting and exhibiting until his death in 1941. His works entered both private and public collections, especially in the Midwest. While not widely discussed in contemporary art historical scholarship, he remains an important figure within regional American art history, valued for his technical proficiency and evocative landscapes.

Aldrich's paintings continue to appear in American museum holdings and in the art market, where they are recognized for their craftsmanship and characteristic atmospheric qualities.

His work is featured in the collection of the Smithsonian American Art Museum.
