= The Wendelsveg in Frankfurt am Main =

1928 painting by Max Beckmann

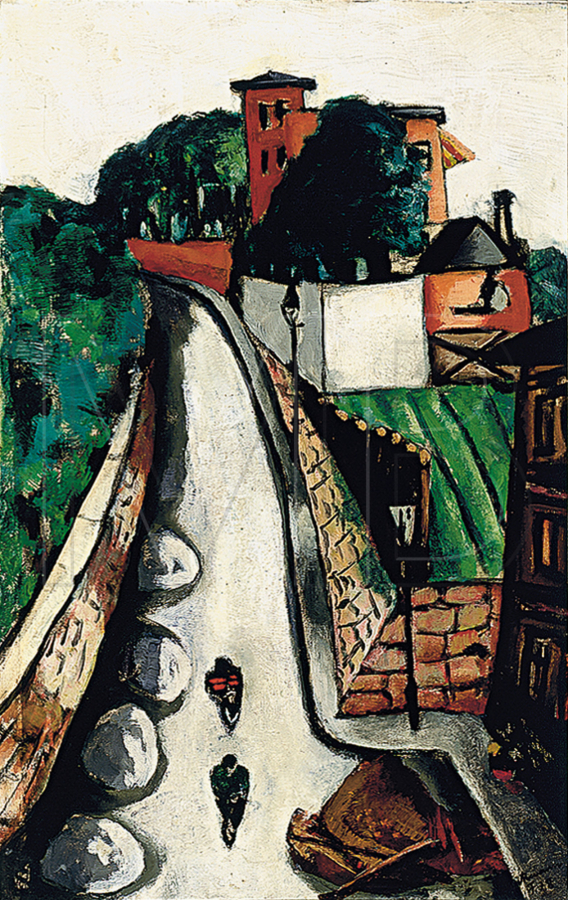
- Artist: Max Beckmann
- Year: 1928
- Medium: Oil on canvas
- Dimensions: 70.5 cm × 44.5 cm (27.8 in × 17.5 in)
- Location: Kunsthalle Kiel; Kiel

The Wendelsveg in Frankfurt am Main is an oil-on-canvas painting by Max Beckmann, executed in 1928 in Frankfurt am Main. It depicts a view from a local street and his housed at the Kunsthalle Kiel.

== Origin ==
Wendelsweg runs parallel to the Darmstädter Landstrasse, in the south of Frankfurt am Main. While the northern part is in a built-up area, the southern part leads through the Frankfurt city forest. Beckmann's apartment was located on Dielmannstraße, near the northern part of the street on the Sachsenhäuser Berg shown here, before he moved to Steinhausenstraße 7 in 1926. Beckmann in this painting took as main theme the street and the parents' house of the Schuberts, a brewery company family from Frankfurt am Main. He made the painting for the sake of Johanna Schubert, the wife and mother of the family with whom he was friends.

== Description ==
The dominant colors of the canvas are white, green and brown, while the design is typically expressionist, almost cubistically distorted. The composition is dominated by the street, the Wendelsweg, which stands up like a steep white tower in the left third of the painting and directs the gaze to two pedestrians. They are at the lower part, close to one another, in the direction of the lower edge of the canvas, out of the field of view of the wandering viewer. Beckmann has the brewery of the Schubert family villa reduced in size to make the house appear larger. The balcony room of the villa, which cannot be seen from the street, but was of particular importance to Johanna Schubert, since all her eight sons where born there, is marked by a bright orange awning. Beckmann's signature is at the bottom right of the picture as Beckmann F. 28.
