= Abstract Head =

Painting by Alexej von Jawlensky

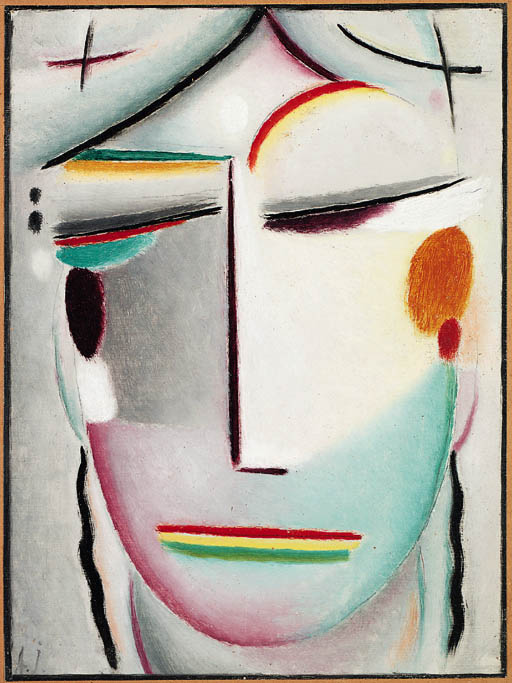
- Saviour's face, distance Highness - Buddha II
- Artist: Alexej von Jawlensky
- Year: c. 1921
- Type: Oil
- Dimensions: 30.8 cm × 24 cm (12.1 in × 9.4 in)
- Location: Private collection

Abstract Head is an oil painting by Russian expressionist Alexej von Jawlensky, from c. 1921.

At about the end of World War I (1918), von Jawlensky started to draw 'mystic heads' or 'faces of saints'. He gave them poetic titles like Moonlight or Inner Look. Like Claude Monet who worked in series', he ended up concentrating on a single theme. Its appearance remained more or less constantly the same, yet varied in the use of the brush, the colorings and in the drawing, in order to bring up new aspects of an until then still unknown transcendent spirituality.

Unlike Wassily Kandinsky, he never moved into pure abstraction and always based his forms on nature.
