= 1931 in art =

Events from the year 1931 in art.

== Events ==
- February 15 – Abstraction-Création group formed in Paris by Theo van Doesburg to promote non-figurative, non-surrealist art. Other founder members include Auguste Herbin, Jean Hélion and Georges Vantongerloo.
- October 4 – Debut appearance of the Dick Tracy comic strip, created by cartoonist Chester Gould.
- The Whitney Museum of American Art is founded by Gertrude Vanderbilt Whitney in its original building in Greenwich Village, New York City.
- The Pierre Matisse Gallery opens in New York City.
- Collector Kay Kimbell of Fort Worth, Texas, purchases his first painting, origin of the Kimbell Art Museum.
- Henry Moore holds his first solo exhibition of sculptures, at The Leicester Galleries in London.

== Works ==
- Max Beckmann – Paris Society
- Thomas Hart Benton – America Today
- Heitor da Silva Costa and Paul Landowski – Christ the Redeemer (statue, Rio de Janeiro)
- Salvador Dalí – The Persistence of Memory
- Robert William Davidson – Eve (sculpture)
- Charles Demuth – Chimney and Watertower
- Antonio Donghi – Woman at the Café
- Frida Kahlo – Frieda and Diego Rivera
- Helmut Kolle – Self-Portrait in White Tie
- Tamara de Lempicka – Adam and Eve
- René Magritte – The Voice of Space
- Carl Milles – Flygarmonumentet (Stockholm)
- Anne Marie Carl-Nielsen – The Herd Boy playing a Wooden Flute (monument to the sculptor's husband, the composer Carl Nielsen (d. 1931), at his birthplace, Nørre Lyndelse)
- Georgia O'Keeffe – Cow's Skull: Red, White, and Blue (Metropolitan Museum of Art, New York)
- Pablo Picasso – Figures by the Sea
- Diego Rivera - The Rivals
- Lorado Taft – The Crusader (sculpture)
- Carel Willink – Late Visitors to Pompeii
- Grant Wood
  - The Birthplace of Herbert Hoover
  - Fall Plowing
  - The Midnight Ride of Paul Revere

== Awards ==
- Archibald Prize: John Longstaff – Sir John Sulman

== Births ==
- January 1 – Stephanie Scuris, Greek-born American artist and sculptor
- January 10 – Massimo Vignelli, Italian graphic designer (d. 2014)
- January 18 – Jay Maisel, photographer
- January 21 – Paul Deliège, Belgian comic strip artist and writer (d. 2005)
- January 30 – Linda Nochlin, née Weinberg, American feminist art historian (d. 2017)
- February 7 – Serge Danot, French animator (d. 1990)
- February 9 – Robert Morris, American sculptor (d. 2018)
- February 16 – Irina Dobrekova, Russian painter
- February 17 – Fay Godwin, German-born English landscape photographer (d. 2005)
- February 18 – Johnny Hart, American cartoonist (d. 2007)
- February 21 – Derek Hyatt, English abstract landscape painter (d. 2015)
- February 23 – Tom Wesselmann, American pop artist (d. 2004)
- February 26
  - Radomir Stević Ras, Serbian painter and designer (d. 1982).
  - Jacques Rouxel, French animator (d. 2004)
- March 4 – Gwilym Prichard, Welsh landscape painter (d. 2015)
- March 13 – Michael Podro, English art historian (d. 2008)
- March 25 – Jack Chambers, Canadian artist and filmmaker (d. 1978)
- April 24 – Bridget Riley, English op art painter
- April 25 – David Shepherd, English wildlife, railway and military painter and conservationist (d. 2017)
- April 26 – Vera Nazina, Russian painter
- April 29 – Frank Auerbach, German-born British painter (d. 2024)
- May 10 – Olja Ivanjicki, Serbian painter (d. 2009)
- June 7 – Malcolm Morley, English-American photographer and painter
- July 8 – Leo Dee, American silverpoint artist (d. 2004)
- July 15
  - Tom Geismar, American graphic designer (Chermayeff & Geismar & Haviv)
  - Brian Sewell, English art critic (d. 2015)
- July 20 – Sheila Fell, English painter (d. 1979)
- July 25 – Carlo Maria Mariani, Italian painter (d. 2021)
- July 28 – Hans Schröder, German sculptor and painter (d. 2010)
- August 15 – Rose Hilton, English painter (d. 2019)
- August 18 – Seymour Chwast, American graphic designer and illustrator
- August 20 – Bernd Becher, German photographer (d. 2007)
- August 24 – Bartolomeu Cid dos Santos, Portuguese artist and professor (d. 2008)
- September 24 – Elizabeth Blackadder, Scottish painter (d. 2021)
- October 9 – Stuart Devlin, Australian-born gold/silversmith (d. 2018)
- October 19 – Li Ki Sun, Korean-Czech textile painter (d. 1999)
- November 7 – Enno Hallek, Estonian-born Swedish artist (d. 2025)
- November 12 – Jeanne Macaskill, New Zealand artist (d. 2014)
- November 25 – Chua Mia Tee, Chinese-born Singaporean artist (d. 2026)
- November 28 – Tomi Ungerer, French artist and writer (d. 2019)
- date unknown – Barrie Cooke, British-born abstract expressionist painter (d. 2014)

== Deaths ==
- January 7
  - Giuseppe Barison, Italian painter (b. 1853)
  - Joseph Bernard, French sculptor (b. 1866)
- February 3 – Jefferson David Chalfant, American painter (b. 1856)
- February 11 – Bela Čikoš Sesija, Croatian Symbolist painter (b. 1864)
- March 7
  - Theo van Doesburg, Dutch painter and architect, leader of De Stijl (b. 1883)
  - Akseli Gallen-Kallela, Finnish painter (b. 1865)
- March 12 – Frida Hansen, Norwegian textile artist (b. 1855)
- March 14 – Alfred Grenander, Swedish-born architect (b. 1863)
- March 24 – Derwent Lees, Australian figure and landscape painter (b. 1884)
- April 6 – William Lionel Wyllie, English marine painter (b. 1851)
- May 1 – Thomas Cooper Gotch, English painter (b. 1854)
- May 31 – Willy Stöwer, German marine painter and illustrator (b. 1864)
- July 11
  - Giovanni Boldini, Italian painter (b. 1842)
  - Jean-Louis Forain, French Impressionist painter (b. 1852)
- September 14 – Tom Roberts, Australian painter (b. 1856)
- September 20 – Max Littmann, German architect (b. 1862)
- September 29 – Sir William Orpen, Irish portrait painter (b. 1878)
- October 7
  - Charles Ricketts, English designer (b. 1866)
  - Daniel Chester French, American sculptor (b. 1850)
- October 10 – Sir Bertram Mackennal, Australian-born sculptor (b. 1863)
- November 17
  - Helmut Kolle, exiled German painter, endocarditis (b. 1899)
  - Edward Simmons, American Impressionist painter (b. 1852)
- December 7 – Leslie Hunter, Scottish painter (b. 1877)
- December 31 – Lancelot Speed, British illustrator (b. 1860)
- date unknown
  - Todor Švrakić, Serbian painter (b. 1882)
  - William John Wainwright, English painter (b. 1855)

== See also ==
- 1931 in fine arts of the Soviet Union
