= 1999 in art =

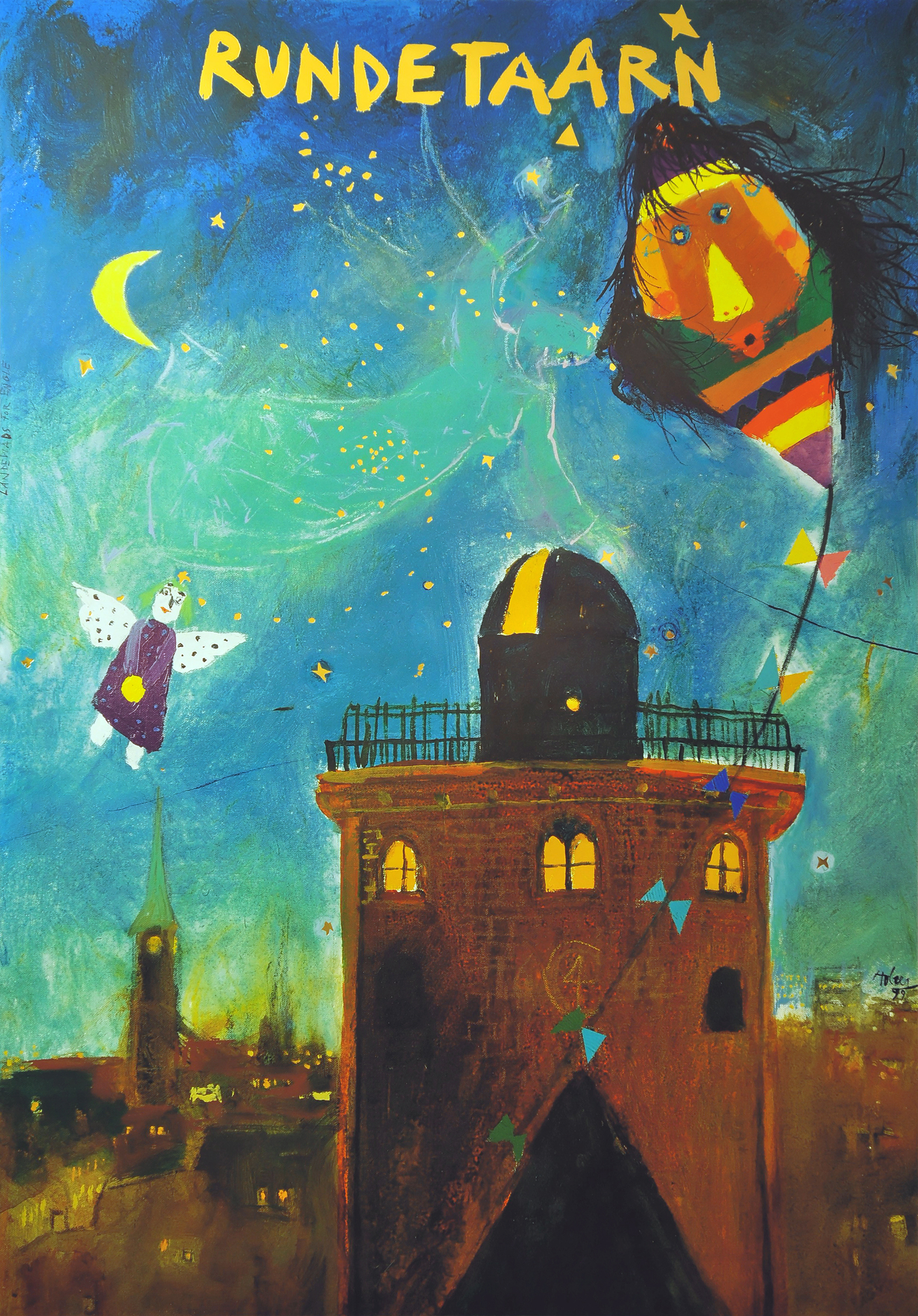
Poster Rundetårn by Adi Holzer, 1999

Events from the year 1999 in art.

== Events ==
- 28 May – After 22 years of restoration work, Leonardo da Vinci's The Last Supper is placed back on display in Milan, Italy.
- July – After 158 years of an empty plinth, Mark Wallinger's Ecce Homo becomes the first work displayed on the Fourth plinth, Trafalgar Square, London.
- 11 December – After 19 years of work, restoration of the Sistine Chapel frescoes is completed in the Vatican City.
- The Stuckism movement is founded by Billy Childish and Charles Thomson.
- Discovery of Venus of Tan-Tan (300,000–500,000 BP) in Morocco, the earliest known artefact to show evidence of human artistic input.

== Exhibitions ==
- 11 March – Jackson Pollock retrospective opens at the Tate London.

== Works ==
- Louise Bourgeois – Maman
- Maurizio Cattelan – La Nona Ora (sculpture)
- Mike Chapman – Christ Child (sculpture, London)
- Fern Cunningham - "Harriet Tubman Memorial - Step on Board" (sculptural tableaux, Boston)
- Tracey Emin – My Bed (exhibited at Tate Gallery, London)
- Antony Gormley – Quantum Cloud (sculpture, London)
- Andreas Gursky – color photographs
  - 99 Cent II Diptychon (diptych)
  - Rhein II
- Friedensreich Hundertwasser - The Hundertwasser Toilets (architectural sculpture in Kawakawa, New Zealand)
- Anish Kapoor – Taratantara (Baltic Flour Mill, Gateshead)
- Cornelia Parker – Hanging Fire (Suspected Arson) (installation)
- Beverly Pepper – Persephone Unbound (bronze, Seattle)
- Neo Rauch – Tal

== Awards ==
- Archibald Prize – Euan MacLeod, Self portrait/head like a hole
- John Moores Painting Prize - Michael Raedecker for "Mirage"
- Schock Prize in Visual Arts – Jacques Herzog and Pierre de Meuron
- Turner Prize – Steve McQueen

-The Venice Biennial-

- The Lion d'or (Golden Lion) for Lifetime Achievement: Louise Bourgeois (USA), Bruce Nauman (USA)
- The Lion d'or for Best Pavilion: Monica Bonvicini, Bruna Esposito, Luisa Lambri, Paola Pivi, Grazia Toderi (Italy)

== Deaths ==
=== January to June ===
- 28 January – Markey Robinson, Irish painter (born 1918)
- 5 February – Nicholas Krushenick, American pop art painter (born 1929)
- 9 February – Richard Allen, American Minimalist, Abstract, Systems, Fundamental and Geometric painter (born 1933)
- 18 February – Andreas Feininger, French-born American photographer (born 1906)
- 10 March – Oswaldo Guayasamín, Ecuadorian painter and sculptor (born 1919)
- 15 March – Harry Callahan, American photographer (born 1912)
- 20 March – Patrick Heron, English painter, writer and designer (born 1920)
- 24 March – Ladjane Bandeira, Brazilian artist and journalist (born 1927)
- 29 March – Lucien Aigner, Hungarian photographer (born 1901)
- 24 April – Arthur Boyd, Australian painter and sculptor (born 1920)
- 2 May – Tibor Kalman, Hungarian-American graphic designer (born 1949)
- 12 May – Saul Steinberg, Romanian-born American cartoonist and illustrator (born 1914)
- 15 June – John Glashan, Scottish cartoonist, illustrator and playwright (born 1927)
- 19 June – Oton Gliha, Croatian painter (born 1914)
- 30 June – Edouard Boubat, French photographer (born 1923)

=== July to December ===
- 5 July – Thea Tewi, German-born American sculptor and lingerie designer (born 1902)
- 14 July – Władysław Hasior, Polish sculptor, painter and set designer (born 1928)
- 15 August – Hugh Casson, British architect, interior designer, artist, writer and broadcaster (born 1910)
- 21 August – Leo Castelli, Italian-American art dealer and gallerist (born 1907)
- 22 August – Yann Goulet, French sculptor, Breton nationalist and war-time collaborationist with Nazi Germany (born 1914)
- 30 August – Raymond Poïvet, French cartoonist (born 1910)
- 13 September – Miriam Davenport, American painter and sculptor (born 1915)
- 23 September - Li Ki Sun, Korean-Czecch textile painter (born 1931
- 4 October – Bernard Buffet, French painter (born 1928)
- 23 October - Albert Tucker, Australian Expressionist painter (born 1914)
- 27 October – Charlotte Perriand, French architect and designer (born 1903)
- 4 November – Richard Clements, Australian painter (born 1951)
- 18 November
  - Stephen Greene American painter (born 1917)
  - Horst P. Horst, German American photographer (born 1906
- 10 December – Antonio Blanco, Filipino painter (born 1912)
- 12 December – Paul Cadmus, American painter (born 1904)
- 28 December – Louis Féraud, French fashion designer and artist (born 1921)
