= 1910 in art =

Events from the year 1910 in art.

== Events ==
- April 27 – Futurist poet Filippo Tommaso Marinetti issues the manifesto Contro Venezia passatista ("Against Past-loving Venice") in the Piazza San Marco.
- Robert Delaunay marries Sonia Terk.
- Bronze sculptor Robert Kionsek joins the Berlin workshop of Ferdinand Preiss to form the PK firm; the two men combine their specialties to produce sculptures in bronze and ivory.
- Czech art historian Antonin Matějček uses the term Expressionism, in opposition to impressionism.
- Russian composer Alexander Scriabin writes Prometheus: The Poem of Fire, Op. 60, a symphonic work for piano, orchestra, optional choir, and clavier à lumières or "Chromola" (a color organ invented by Preston Millar).
- A replica of Michelangelo's statue of David is installed on the Piazza della Signoria in Florence (where the original stood from 1504 to 1873).

== Exhibitions ==
- March 18 – May 1 – Salon des Indépendants: Jean Metzinger, Henri Le Fauconnier and Robert Delaunay are shown together in Room 18. Metzinger exhibits Portrait de Guillaume Apollinaire, considered by Apollinaire to be the first cubist portrait.
- July 15 – October 9 – First International Art Exhibition in Düsseldorf (Kunstpalast), organized by Sonderbund westdeutscher Kunstfreunde und Künstler.
- October 1 – November 8 – Salon d'Automne: Jean Metzinger, Henri Le Fauconnier and Fernand Léger exhibit in Room VIII. Following this salon Metzinger writes his important Note sur la peinture article (published in Pan (Paris), October–November 1910), depicting the new art movement of Pablo Picasso, Georges Braque, Robert Delaunay and Henri Le Fauconnier, noting that these artists (himself included) "discarded traditional perspective and granted themselves the liberty of moving around objects." This is the Cubist concept of "mobile perspective" that would tend towards the representation of the "total image" (an object seen from various view-points simultaneously).
- November 8 – January 15, 1911 – Manet and the Post-Impressionists at the Grafton Galleries in London, organized by Roger Fry, introduces the term Post-Impressionism.
- Meisterwerke muhammedanischer Kunst in Munich.

== Works ==
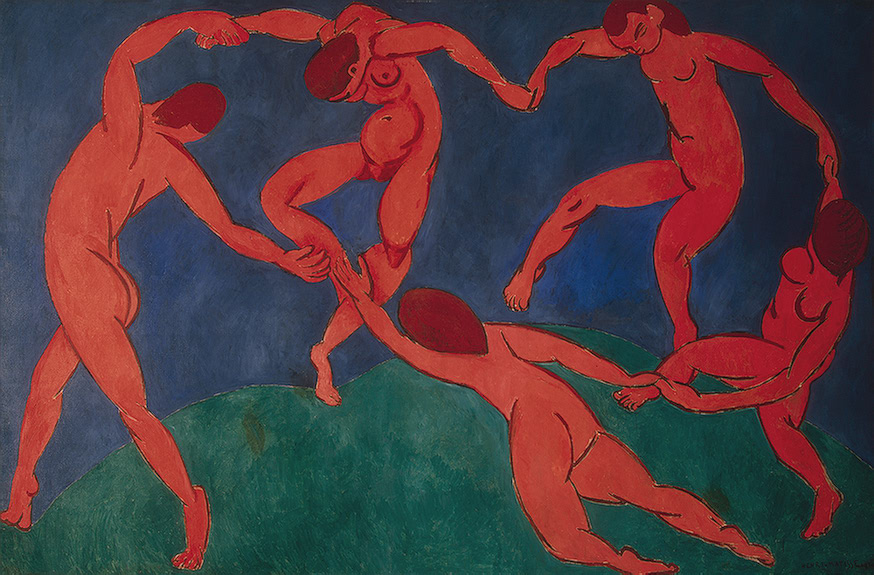
Henri Matisse - Dance (second version), oil on canvas, 260 x 391 cm, Hermitage Museum

Jean Metzinger - Nu à la cheminée. Exhibited at the 1910 Salon d'Automne; published in Les Peintres Cubistes by Guillaume Apollinaire in 1913. Whereabouts unknown

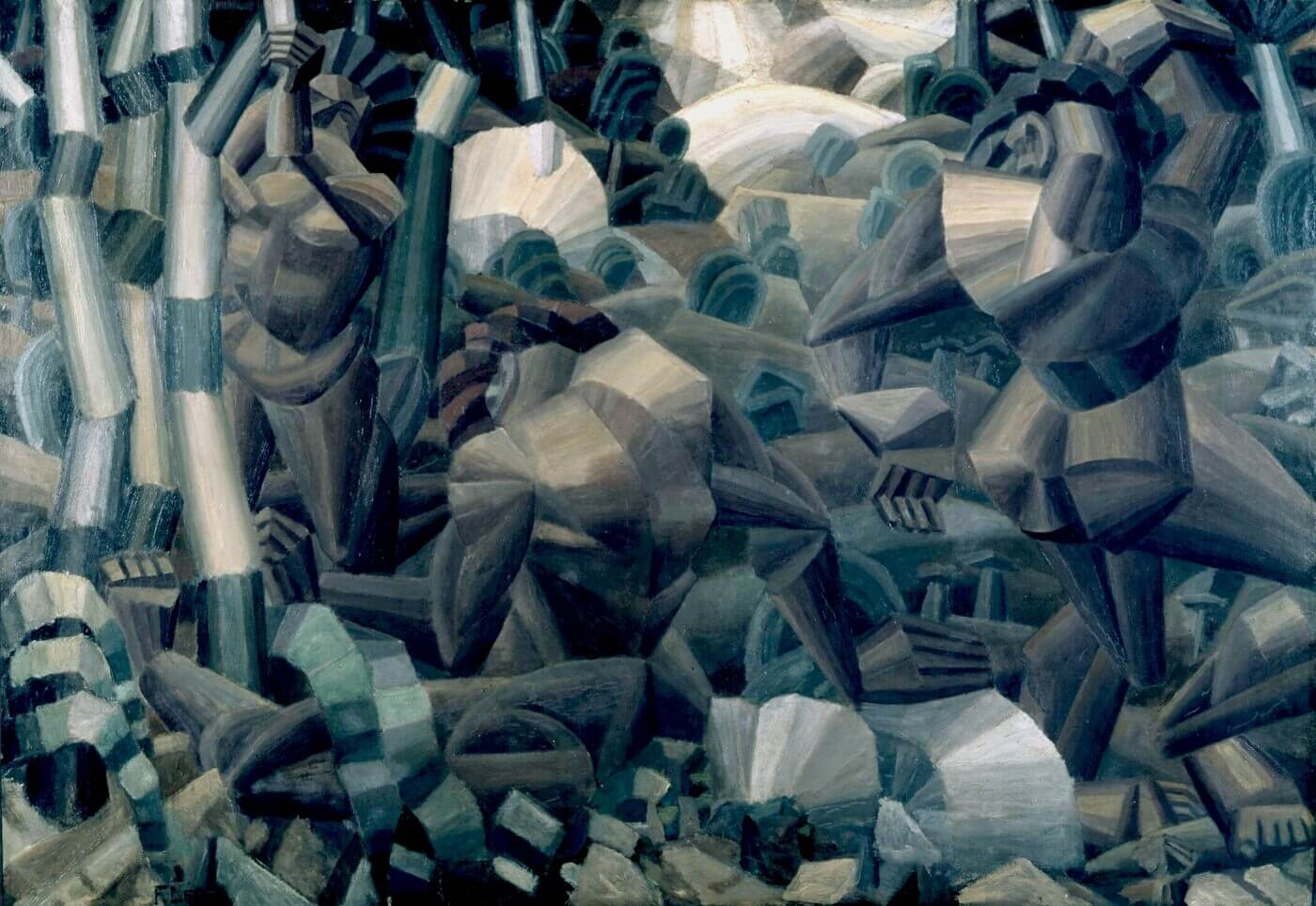
Fernand Léger - Nudes in the forest (Nus dans la forêt), oil on canvas, 120 x 170 cm, Kröller-Müller Museum

- Henry Bacon and Daniel Chester French
  - James Oglethorpe Monument
  - Statue of Samuel Spencer
- Umberto Boccioni – The City Rises
- Hanns Bolz – Portrait of Alfred Flechtheim
- Pierre Bonnard – Girl with Parrot
- Joachim-Raphaël Boronali (pseudonym of a donkey, Lola) – Et le soleil s'endormit sur l'Adriatique
- Georges Braque – Violin and Candlestick
- John Charlton – The Women
- Henri-Edmond Cross – Cypresses at Cagnes
- Salvador Dalí (age 6) – Landscape Near Figueras
- Lyonel Feininger – Straße im Dämmern
- Stanhope Forbes – The Harbour Window
- Jean Louis Gerome -
  - the Abduction of Pocahontas
- Albert Gleizes
  - L'Arbre (The Tree)
  - La Femme aux Phlox
- J. W. Godward
  - A Cool Retreat
  - Noon Day Rest
  - Reverie (first version)
  - Sappho
- Spencer Gore – Rule Britannia
- Arthur Hacker – A Wet Night at Piccadilly Circus
- Erich Heckel
  - Landscape with Bathing Women
  - Standing Child (Fränzi Standing; color woodcut)
- Goscombe John – The Boy Scout
- Wassily Kandinsky – Improvisation 7
- Ernst Ludwig Kirchner
  - Fränzi in front of Carved Chair
  - Playing Nudes
  - Standing Nude with Hat
- Mikhail Larionov – Self-portrait
- John Lavery – Mrs Lavery sketching
- Fernand Léger – Nudes in the forest (Nus dans la forêt)
- Wilhelm Lehmbruck – sculptures
  - Female torso
  - Standing female figure
- L. S. Lowry – Clifton Junction Morning
- Bertram Mackennal – Profile head of King George V for British Empire medals and coins
- Aristide Maillol – Flora, Nude (bronze cast of c.1965 at Museum of Fine Arts, Houston)
- Jacek Malczewski – Christ and the Samaritan Woman
- Franz Marc – Horse in a Landscape
- Henri Matisse
  - Dance (final version)
  - Music
- Jean Metzinger
  - Nu à la cheminée (Nude)
  - Deux Nus (Two Nudes)
- Burr Churchill Miller – Thomas Brackett Reed
- William Orpen – Self Portrait
- Henry Payne – Plucking the Red and White Roses in the Old Temple Gardens
- Pablo Picasso – Portrait of Daniel-Henry Kahnweiler
- Arthur Rackham – Illustrations to Der Ring des Nibelungen (publication begins)
- Pierre-Auguste Renoir
  - Nude (National Museum of Serbia, Belgrade)
  - Self-portrait
- Henri Rousseau – The Dream
- Egon Schiele
  - Kneeling nude self-portrait
  - Portrait of Eduard Kosmack
- Valentin Serov – Ida Rubenstein
- Pedro Subercaseaux – The Open Cabildo of 22 May 1810
- Pierre Adolphe Valette
  - Albert Square, Manchester
  - Oxford Road, Manchester
- Adolf Wölfli – Irren-Anstalt Band-Hain

== Births ==
=== January to June ===
- January 6 – Wright Morris, American novelist, photographer, and essayist (d. 1998).
- January 22 – Joy Adamson, Austria-Kenyan painter and conservationist (d. 1980).
- January 29 – Colin Middleton, Irish artist (d. 1983).
- February 20 – Julian Trevelyan, English printmaker (d. 1988)
- March 10 – David Rose, American animator (d. 2006).
- March 18 – Leonard Bocour, paint-maker, painter (d. 1993).
- March 31 – Edward Seago, English painter (d. 1974).
- April 12 – Gillo Dorfles, Italian art critic, painter, philosopher and poet (d. 2018).
- April 24 – Fuller Potter, American Abstract expressionist artist (d. 1990).
- April 29 – Edward Wesson, English watercolour artist (d. 1983).
- May 7 – Robert Darwin, English painter and Rector of the Royal College of Art (d. 1974)
- May 23
  - Hugh Casson, British architect, interior designer, artist, writer and broadcaster (d. 1999).
  - Franz Kline, painter (d. 1962).
- June 6 – Hélène de Beauvoir, French painter (d. 2001).
- June 8
  - C. C. Beck, American cartoonist and comic book artist (d. 1989).
  - Fernand Fonssagrives, French photographer (d. 2003).
- June 17 – Raymond Poïvet, French cartoonist (d. 1999).

=== July to December ===
- 14 July – William Hanna, American cartoonist (d. 2001).
- 22 July – Antonio Rodríguez Luna, Spanish painter (d. 1985).
- 30 July – Edgar de Evia, Mexican-born American photographer (d. 2003).
- 1 August
  - James Henry Govier, English painter (d. 1974).
  - Gerda Taro, born Gerta Pohorylle, German-born war photographer (k. 1937).
- 19 August – Quentin Bell, English art historian and author (d. 1996).
- 25 August – Dorothea Tanning, American painter (d. 2012).
- 28 August – Morris Graves, American painter and printmaker (d. 2001).
- 3 September – Kitty Carlisle Hart, American singer, actress and New York State Council on the Arts member (d. 2007).
- 7 October – Henry Plumer McIlhenny, American, art collector, philanthropist and chairman of Philadelphia Museum of Art (d. 1986).
- 29 October – Aurélie Nemours, French painter (d. 2005).
- 28 November – Garrett Eckbo, American landscape architect (d. 2000).
- 2 December – Russell Lynes, American art historian, photographer and author (d. 1991).
- 8 December - Constance Howard, English textile artist (d. 2000).
- December – Tullio Crali, Montenegrin-born Futurist painter (d. 2000).

== Deaths ==
- February 14 – John Macallan Swan, English painter and sculptor (b. 1846)
- March 11 – Willis E. Davis, American landscape painter (b. 1855; suicide at sea)
- March 21 – Nadar, French photographer and caricaturist (b. 1820)
- April 13 – William Quiller Orchardson, British portrait painter (b. 1835)
- May 1 – John Quincy Adams Ward, American sculptor (b. 1830)
- May 16 – Henri-Edmond Cross, French pointillist painter(b. 1856)
- June 28 – Petar Ubavkić, Serbian sculptor and painter (b. 1852)
- August 10 – Pierre-Adrien Dalpayrat, French ceramicist (b. 1844)
- September 2 – Henri Rousseau, French primitive painter (b. 1844)
- September 7 – William Holman Hunt, English pre-Raphaelite painter (b. 1827)
- September 10 – Emmanuel Frémiet, French sculptor (b. 1824)
- September 29 – Winslow Homer, American marine painter (b. 1836)
- November 14 – John LaFarge, American painter and stained glass artist (b. 1835)
