= Albert Square, Manchester =

Public square in Manchester, England

Albert Square
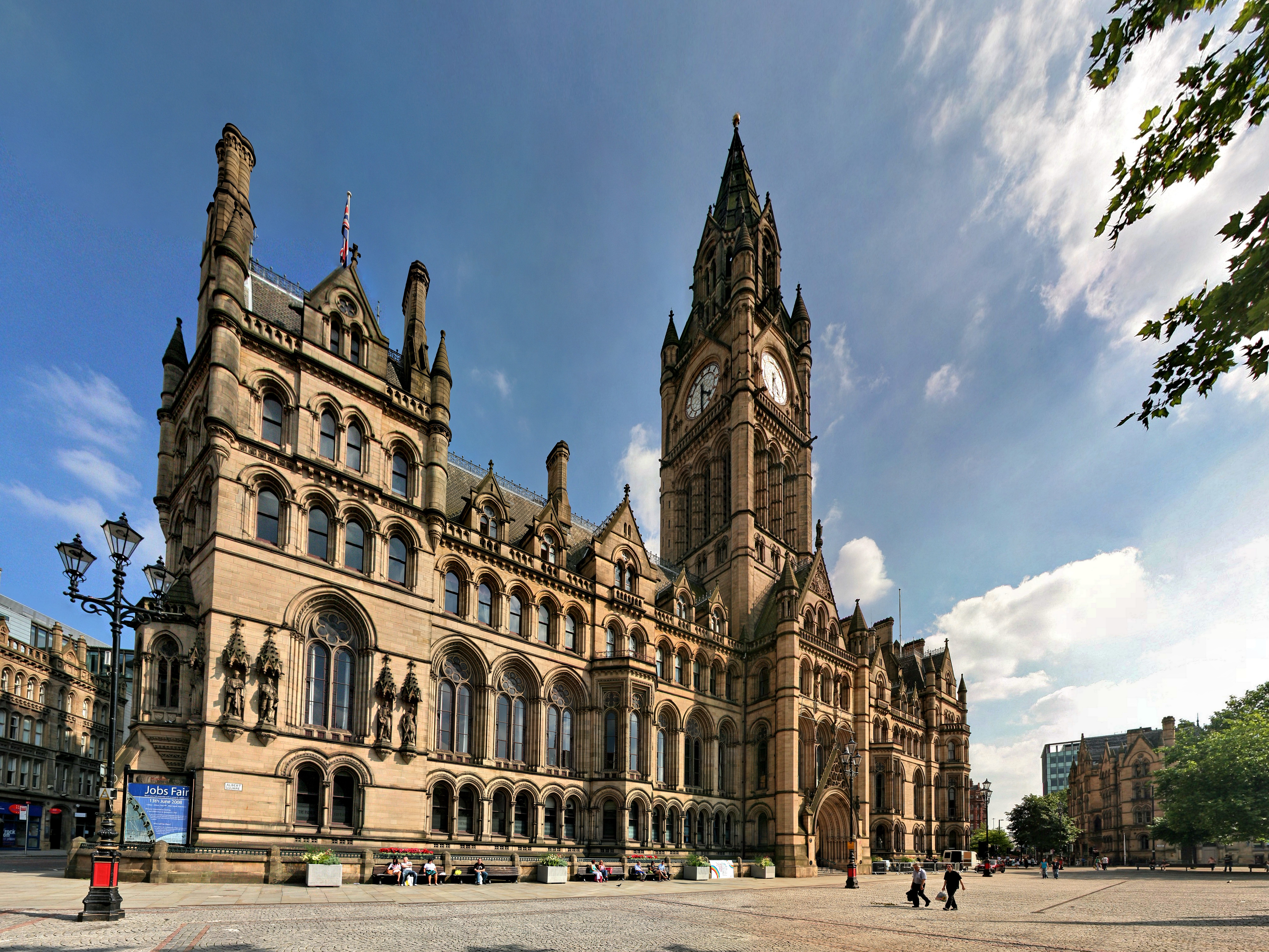
- Albert Square, overlooked by Manchester Town Hall
- Interactive map of Albert Square
- Maintained by: City of Manchester
- Location: Manchester, England, UK
- Coordinates: 53°28′46″N 2°14′42″W

Construction
- Completed: c. 1864; 162 years ago

Albert Square is a public square in the centre of Manchester, England. It is dominated by its largest building, the Grade I listed Manchester Town Hall, a Victorian Gothic building by Alfred Waterhouse. Other smaller buildings from the same period surround it, many of which are listed (the buildings on the north side are in Princess Street).

The square contains a number of monuments and statues, the largest of which is the Albert Memorial, a monument to Prince Albert, Prince Consort of Queen Victoria. The square, named after the Prince, was laid out to provide a space for the memorial in 1863–67. Work on the town hall began in 1868 and was completed in 1877.

== History ==
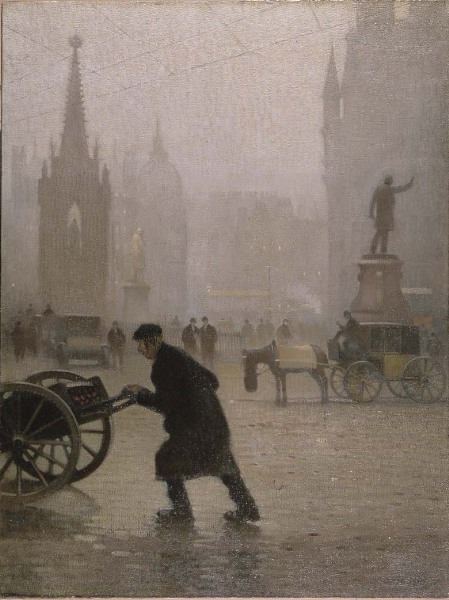
Albert Square, Manchester, a 1910 oil painting by Adolphe Valette. The Albert Memorial (left) and Gladstone statue (right) can be seen in the foreground.

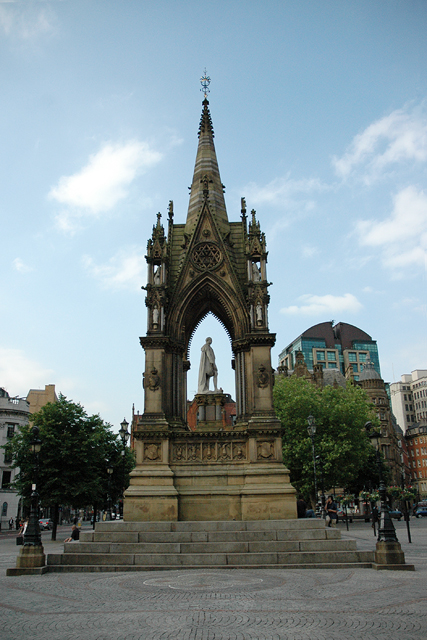
Albert Memorial (Thomas Worthington & Matthew Noble, 1869)

The area in which the square is situated was once derelict land and an area of dense housing near the Town Yard and the River Tib (named Longworth's Folly).

The square's creation arose out of a project by Manchester Corporation's Monuments Committee to erect a memorial to Prince Albert who had died of typhoid in 1861. After initial proposals to create a memorial library, museum or botanical gardens, the committee decided to erect a statue in a decorated canopy. It was originally planned to place the monument in front of the Royal Infirmary building at Piccadilly, between the statues of Wellington and Peel. However it was felt that its ornate Gothic design was not in keeping with the neoclassical infirmary. In 1863, land was offered by the Corporation which was cleared to make way for a public space.

The project won much public support; the Manchester Bricklayers' Protection Society donated 50,000 bricks towards the monument's construction, "as an expression of sympathy towards our beloved Queen". When construction problems arose (the site was found to be riddled with drains and culverts) and the bricks were used up on the foundations alone, a public subscription was launched in 1865 and a further £6,249 was raised, in spite of the hardships of the Cotton Famine.

Clearing the site began in 1864, and required the demolition of over 100 buildings, including the Engraver's Arms pub, a coffee roasting works, a smithy, a coal yard and various warehouses. The project was encouraged by the visit of the Prince and Princess of Wales to open the Albert Monument in 1869.

It was decided to construct a new town hall for Manchester, as the old building in King Street had become too small. Following an architectural competition, Gothic designs for a building with a high bell tower by Sir Alfred Waterhouse were selected, and the Town Hall was begun in 1868 and completed in 1877.

In the early 1970s, there was a plan to build an underground station under Albert Square and neighbouring St Peter's Square, as part of the ill-fated Picc-Vic tunnel project. The project was eventually cancelled and the station was not built.

In April 1972, the area around Albert Square was designated a conservation area, and in 1981 to include the neighbouring, newly created Lincoln Square. (The creation of Lincoln Square completed a "procesional way" from the Law Courts through Spinningfields and Lincoln Square to the Town Hall.)

The centre of Albert Square was originally laid out in the form of a traffic circle and a group of bus stops occupied the western part. In 1987 the square was redesigned and the eastern side in front of the town hall was pedestrianised. The square was laid with fan-shaped granite setts, York stone paving and 'heritage'-style cast-iron street furniture.

== Monuments ==
=== Albert Memorial ===
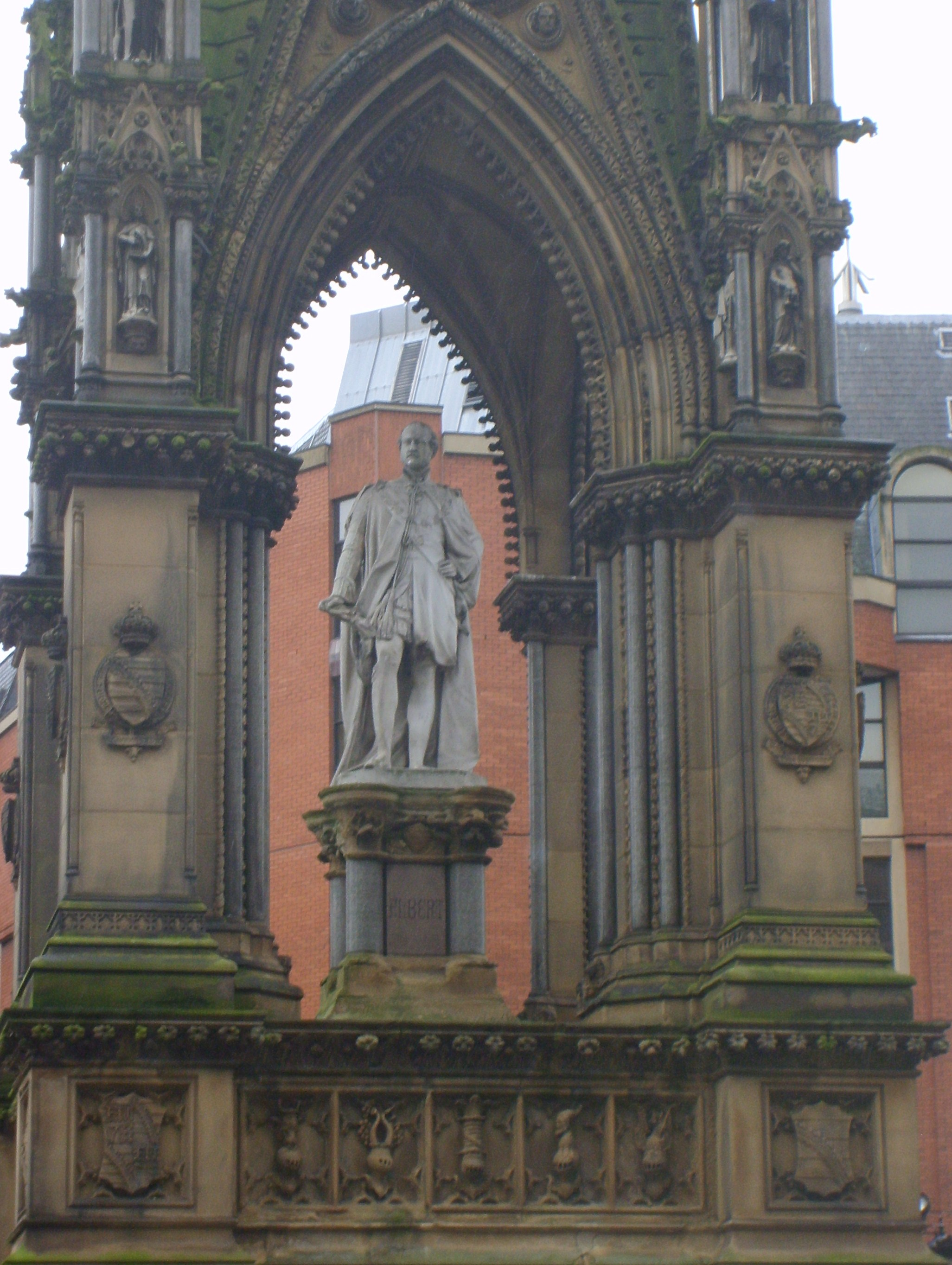
Close-up of the Albert Memorial

Albert Square's largest monument is the Grade I listed Albert Memorial, commemorating the Prince Consort. It features a marble statue of Albert standing on a plinth and facing west, designed by Matthew Noble (1862–1867). The figure is placed within a large Medieval-style ciborium which was designed by the architect Thomas Worthington. Noble was commissioned by the then mayor, Thomas Goadsby, to sculpt the Prince's likeness, and the designs were personally approved by Queen Victoria.

Worthington himself had, at the age of 18, been presented with the Royal Society of Arts' Isis Gold Medal by Prince Albert for a design for a Gothic-style chancel. His Medieval-style design for the Albert Memorial was inspired by the Church of Santa Maria della Spina in Pisa. Although his design was unusual for its time, commentators have suggested he may have been influenced by George Kemp's Scott Monument in Princes Street, Edinburgh, built 20 years earlier.

The memorial is topped with an ornate spire, and on each side a crocketed gable with canopied pinnacles on colonettes. Within the canopies stand symbolic figures representing art, commerce, science and agriculture. Below these stand secondary figures representing particular disciplines:

- The Four Arts: painting, architecture, music, sculpture
- Commerce: the Four Continents
- The Four Sciences: chemistry, astronomy, mechanics, mathematics
- Agriculture: the Four Seasons

The coloured sett paving which was laid around the memorial in 1987 depicts floral representations of the Four Home Nations of England, Ireland, Scotland and Wales.

Proposals to move or demolish the Albert Memorial have been made; a plan to replace Prince Albert with a war memorial following the First World War was defeated; and when the Albert Memorial had fallen into disrepair, it was proposed that it should be demolished. It was rescued from destruction several times by campaigners, and was finally restored with help from Robert Ernest Shapley in 1976–77. The Albert Memorial Restoration Committee, chaired by J. L. Womersley, raised £50,000 to repair the memorial through public appeal, a fact that is noted in an inscription at its base.

==== London Albert Memorial ====
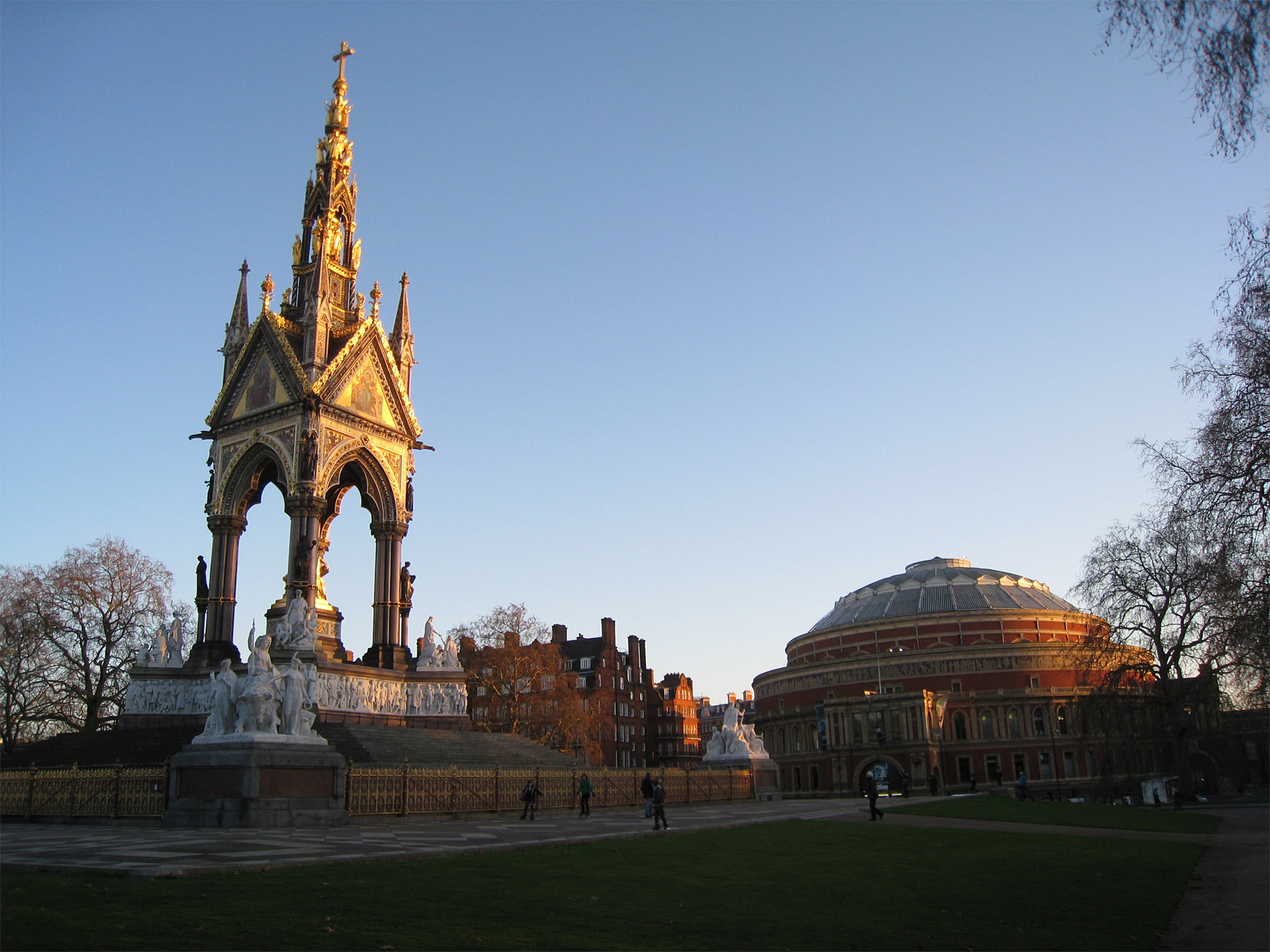
Albert Memorial, London (George Gilbert Scott, 1872)

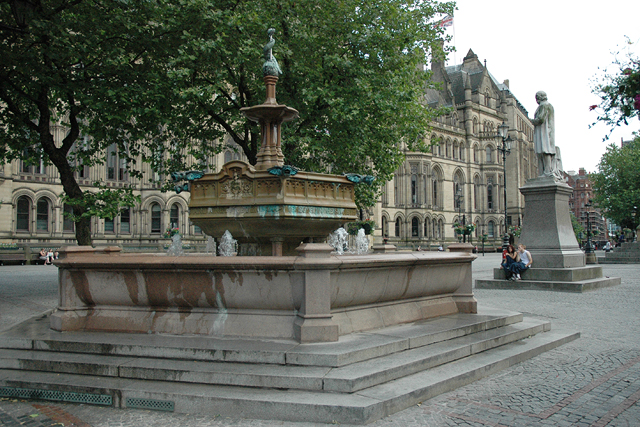
The fountain in Albert Square, erected for the Diamond Jubilee of Queen Victoria

Manchester's Albert Memorial, completed in 1865, was the first of several Albert Memorials around the United Kingdom, and it bears a noticeable similarity to the Albert Memorial in Kensington Gardens, London, which was completed some seven years after the Mancunian monument. Claims that Worthington's design influenced George Gilbert Scott in his London monument are disputed. Scott, writing in his Recollections, stated that his idea of building a medieval canopy was original, "so new as to provoke much opposition".

=== Other monuments ===
Within the square are several other monuments:

- Bishop James Fraser by Thomas Woolner (1887), Grade II listed
- John Bright by Albert Bruce-Joy (1891), Grade II listed
- Oliver Heywood by Albert Bruce-Joy (1894), Grade II listed
- William Ewart Gladstone by Mario Raggi (1901), Grade II listed
- A fountain (also designed by Thomas Worthington) erected for the Diamond Jubilee of Queen Victoria (1897). This was returned to the square in 1997 having been kept in storage for a period before that.

==== Gallery ====
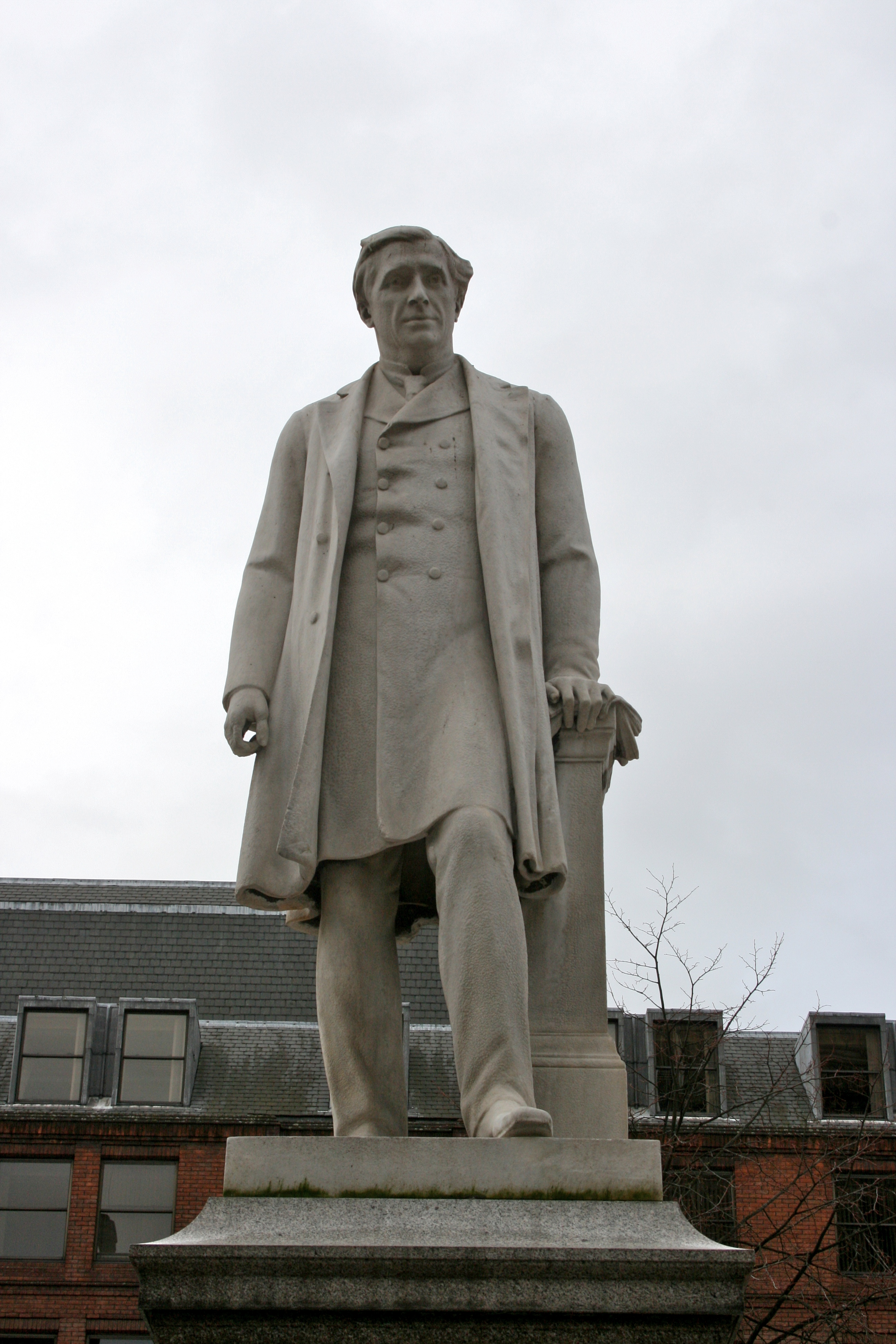
Statue of Oliver Heywood

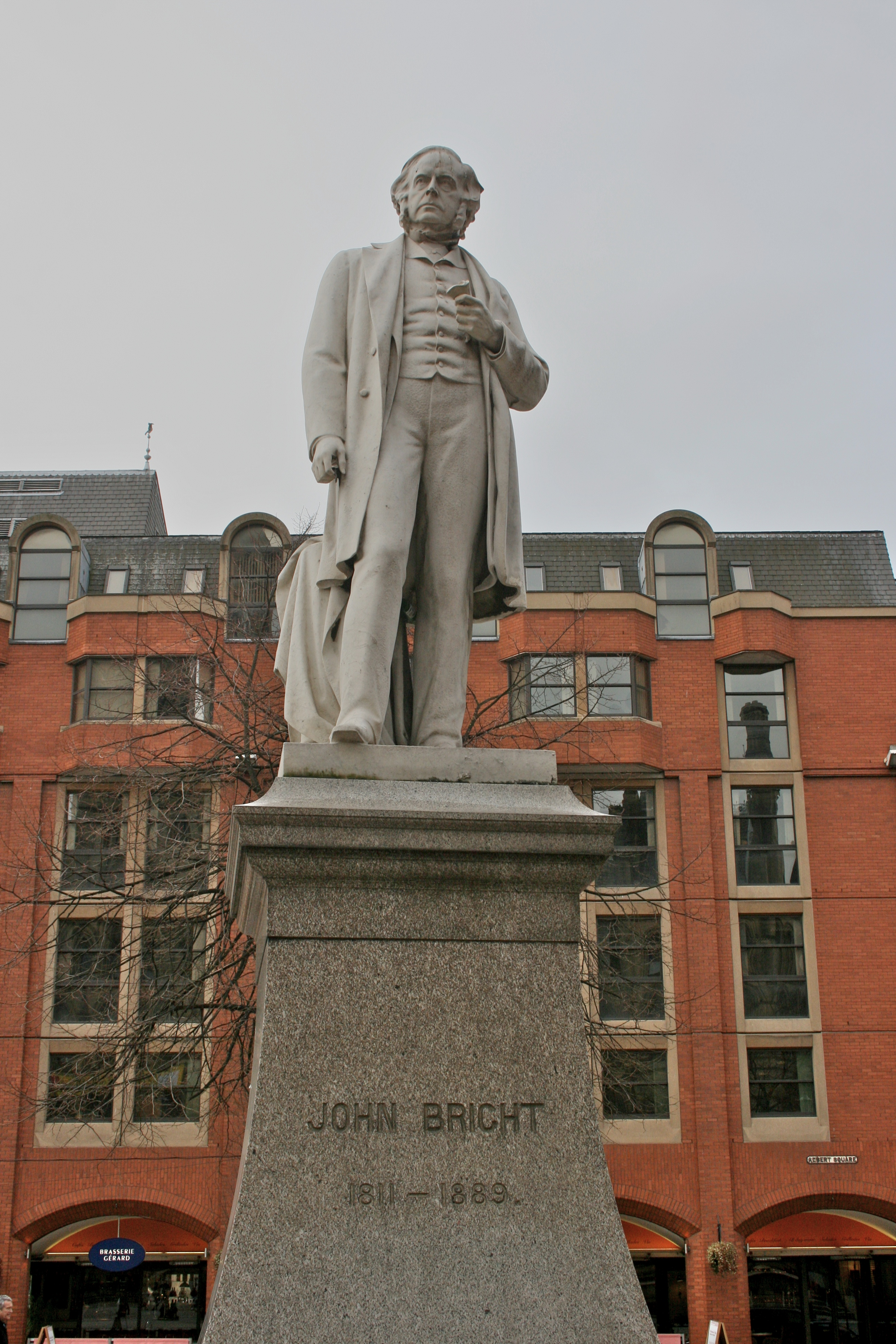
Statue of John Bright

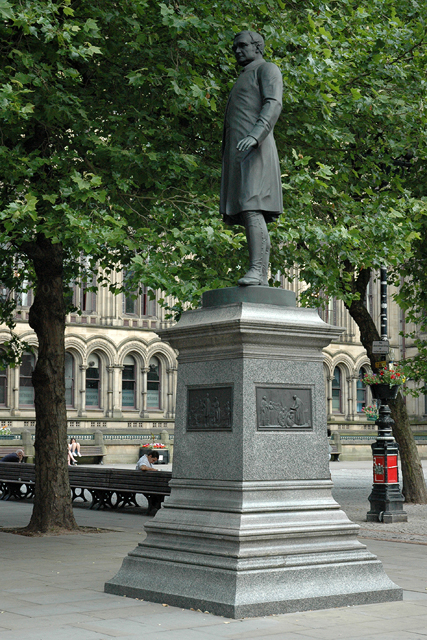
James Fraser (1818–85), Bishop of Manchester (1870–85)

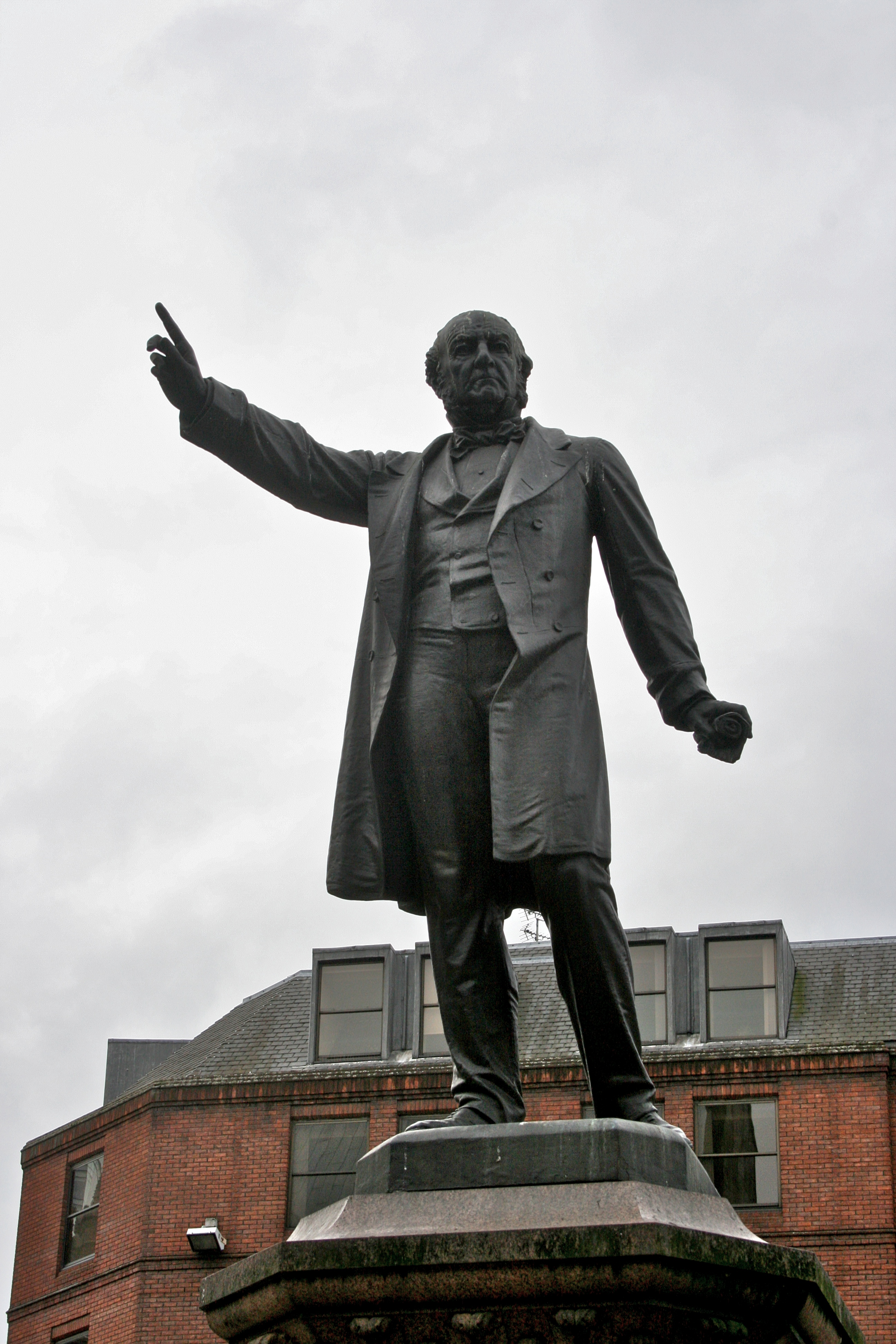
Statue of William Ewart Gladstone

==== Lincoln Square ====
Neighbouring Lincoln Square, created in 1981, features:

- A fountain commemorating the wedding of Prince Charles and Lady Diana Spencer in 1981 (since converted into a flower bed)
- A statue of Abraham Lincoln (1809–1865), 16th President of the United States, by George Gray Barnard in the eponymous Lincoln Square was presented to the city by Mr. and Mrs. Charles Phelps Taft of Cincinnati, Ohio, in 1919 to mark the part that Lancashire played in the cotton famine and American Civil War of 1861–1865. The Lincoln statue was originally located in Platt Fields Park and was moved to the square in 1986.

Lincoln Square is connected to Albert Square and Deansgate by the two sections of Brazennose Street. The street was pedestrianised as part of a plan (first formulated in 1945) to create a "Processional Way" between the law courts at Crown Square and the Town Hall.

== Notable buildings ==
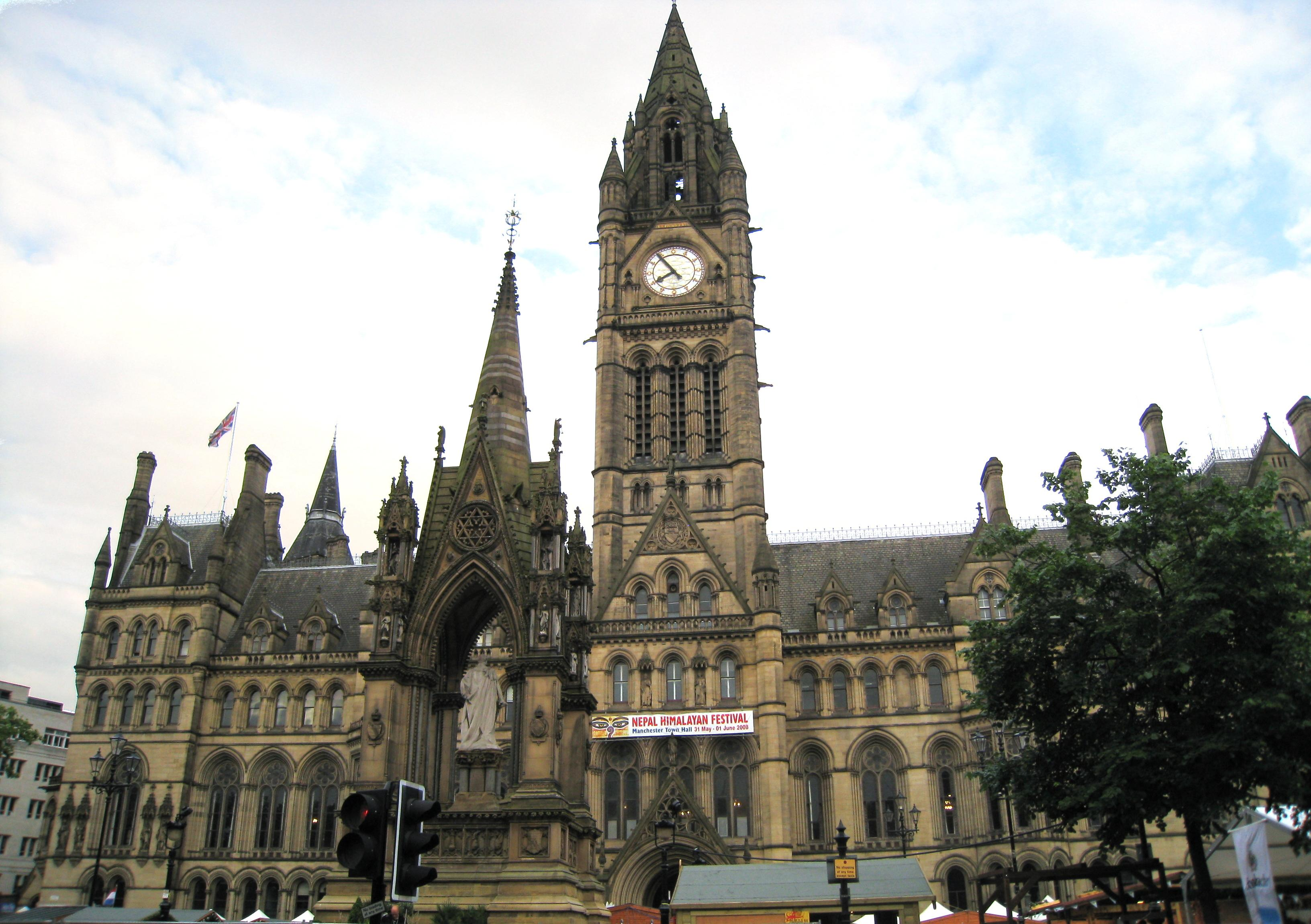
Albert Memorial in front of the town hall

Albert Square is bounded by a varied selection of listed Victorian buildings, the largest being the town hall. Only the western side of the square (facing the town hall) has lost its original buildings and is now occupied by brick and glass office blocks erected during the 1980s. Buildings in Albert Square include:

- Manchester Town Hall (1868–77) – neo-Gothic sandstone ashlar local governmental building on a triangular site, with a 280 ft (85 m) bell tower, housing a carillon of 23 bells, designed by Alfred Waterhouse for Manchester Corporation. Contains mural paintings by Ford Madox Brown.
- the Abbey National building (c.1900), Grade II listed – Neoclassical Portland stone bank by Percy Worthington with semicircular front.
- Albert Chambers, 16 Albert Square (1873), Grade II listed – Venetian-style sandstone ashlar offices designed by Clegg and Knowles for Manchester Corporation Gasworks.
- Carlton House (formerly Bridgewater Buildings), 17–18 Albert Square (1872), Grade II listed – Venetian Gothic-style sandstone ashlar office buildings by Clegg and Knowles.
- St Andrew's Chambers, 20–21 Albert Square (1874), Grade II listed – Neo-Gothic sandstone corner building designed by George T. Redmayne for the Scottish Widows Fund Life Assurance Society.
- The Memorial Hall, by architect Thomas Worthington for the Unitarian Church (1866), Grade II* listed, Southmill Street corner.
