= The Voice of Space =

1931 painting series by René Magritte

- Artist: René Magritte
- Year: 1931
- Dimensions: 727 mm × 542 mm (28.6 in × 21.3 in)

The Voice of Space (La Voix des airs, 1931) is an oil painting by René Magritte. Four oil versions exist of the image. The most famous is that held in the Solomon R. Guggenheim Foundation, Peggy Guggenheim Collection, Venice. Another publicly displayed version is held at the Albright-Knox Art Gallery, Buffalo, New York.

Bells float high in the sky. The jingle bell is a motif that recurs often in Magritte's work. He wrote: "I caused the iron bells hanging from the necks of our admirable horses to sprout like dangerous plants at the edge of an abyss."

Dutch composer Johan de Meij depicted the painting in the first movement of his suite The Venetian Collection.

== See also ==
- List of paintings by René Magritte
- 1931 in art
