= Christ Child (sculpture) =

Sculpture at St Martin-in-the-Fields, London

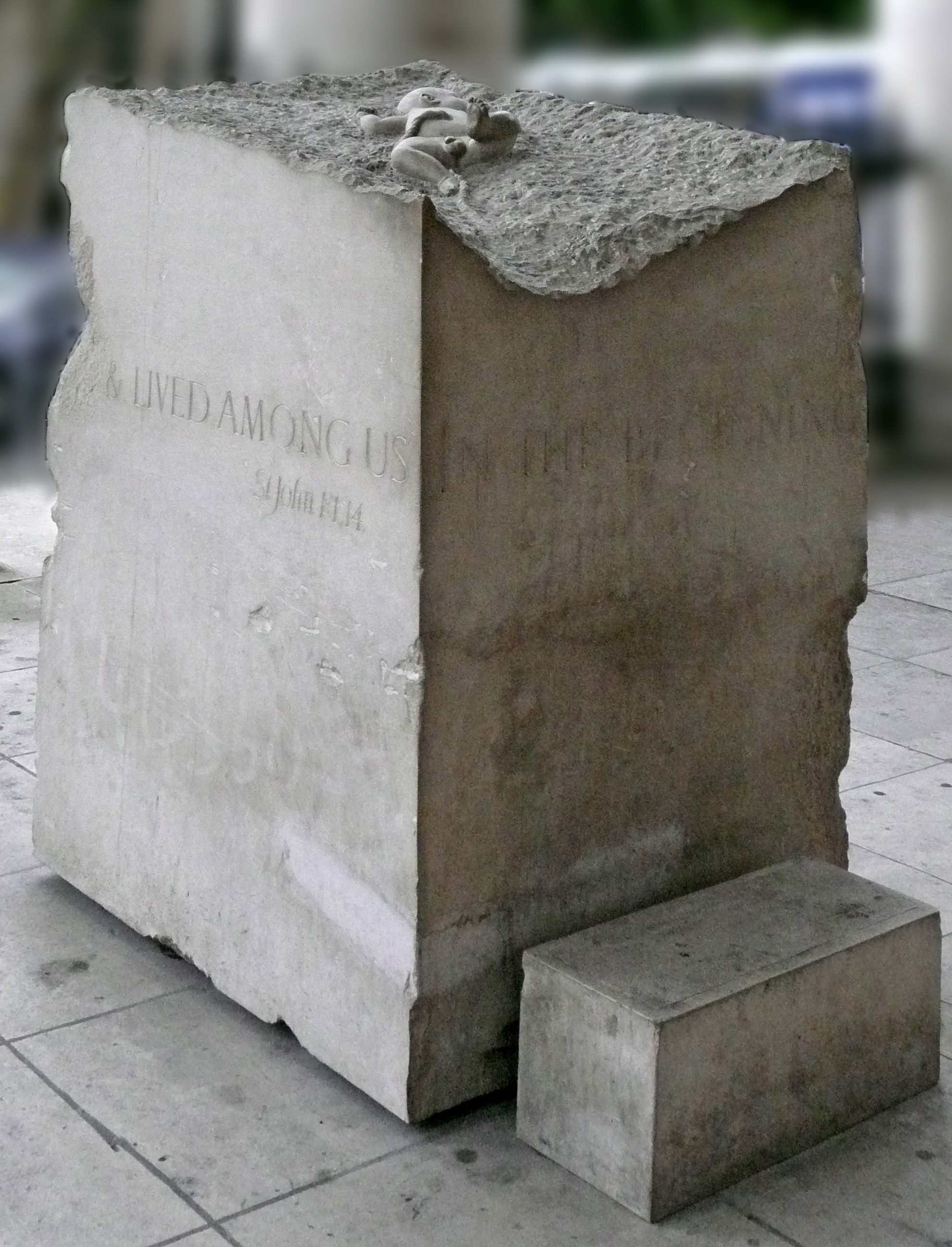
- The sculpture in 2008
- Year: 1999; 27 years ago
- Type: Sculpture
- Medium: Portland stone
- Subject: Jesus
- Location: London, WC2 United Kingdom; 51.508845°N 0.127009°W

Christ Child, also known as In the Beginning or the Millennium Sculpture, is an outdoor sculpture by Michael "Mike" Chapman, located under the portico of St Martins-in-the-Fields at Trafalgar Square in London, United Kingdom. The opening text from the Gospel of John is inscribed around the sculpture: "In the beginning was the word and the word became flesh and lived among us". Chapman has said of the sculpture: "For the millennium I was commissioned to produce a sculpture to be placed in Trafalgar square, during Christmas prior to the celebrations. It seemed to me that a tiny life-size baby carved from stone in such an enormous environment would be the best way to remind us all of just whose birthday we were celebrating. In a 4.5-tonne (4.4-long-ton; 5.0-short-ton) block of Portland stone, this work can be found at the entrance to the church." It has been called "strikingly modern".

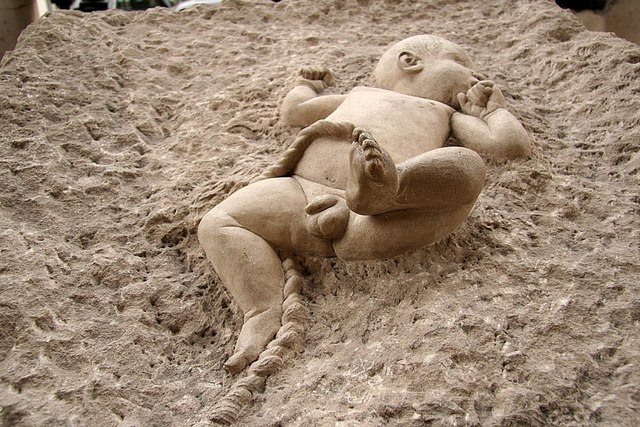
Detail

== See also ==
- 1999 in art
- List of statues of Jesus
