= Woman at the Café =

1931 painting by Antonio Donghi

- Artist: Antonio Donghi
- Year: 1931
- Medium: Oil on canvas
- Dimensions: 80 cm × 60 cm (31 in × 24 in)
- Location: Ca' Pesaro; Venice

Woman at the Café (Italian: Donna al caffè) is a 1931 painting by the Italian artist Antonio Donghi. It depicts a lone woman at a café table.

It is painted with oil on canvas and has the dimensions 80 × 60 centimeters. It belongs to the Fondazione Musei Civici di Venezia. It is on view at the Ca' Pesaro's Modern Art Museum in Venice.

== Reception ==
Cipriano Efisio Oppo called the painting "clean as a copper pot in a kitchen". Alberto Francini of L'Italia Letteraria wrote about the scene: "And do not let the lone, bare table in a seaside Trattoria in Ostia deceive you. There is no tragedy. There will soon be a steaming bowl of fragrant fish soup [on it]. The Woman at the Café will have her ice cream, and the Young Girl will find a husband."

== See also ==
- Post-expressionism
