= Jaroslav Bejček =

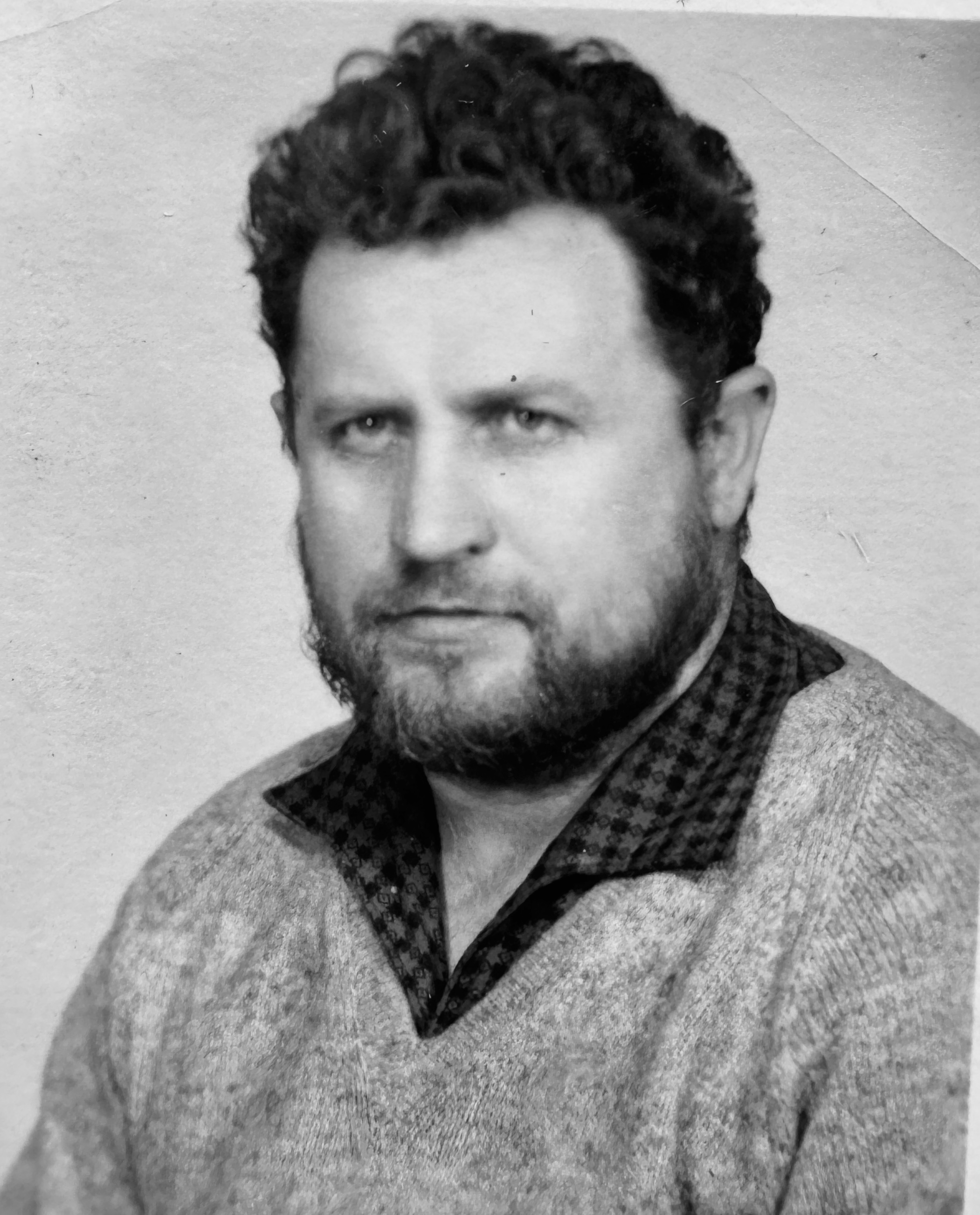
- Born: 9 July 1926; Louka u Litvínova, Czechoslovakia
- Died: 17 September 1986 (aged 60); Ústí nad Labem, Czechoslovakia
- Education: Academy of Arts, Architecture and Design
- Spouse: Li Ki Sun Bejčková

Jaroslav Bejček (9 July 1926 – 17 September 1986) was a Czech painter, graphic artist, sculptor, and illustrator.

== Life and career ==
Bejček was born on 9 July 1926 in Louka u Litvínova, Czechoslovakia (present-day, Czech Republic) into a family of miners. He first studied sculpture and then painting at the ceramics school in Teplice, where one of his instructors was Vladimír Šavel. He then pursued study at the Academy of Arts, Architecture and Design in Prague under Karel Svolinský.

He then voyaged to People's Republic of China. It was there that he met the woman who would become his wife, the Korean textile artist Li Ki Sun, who then became Li Ki Sun Bejčková. The couple at first resided in Bejček's hometown of Louka u Litvínova, then in Most and from 1960 on in Ústí nad Labem, where they worked as part of a small colony of artists. He created his own workshop in Stadice. Subsequently, he left for Prague.

On 17 September 1986, Bejček died in Ústí nad Labem aged 60.
