= Derek Hyatt =

British landscape painter

Derek James Hyatt (21 February 1931 – 8 December 2015) was a British landscape painter, known best for his abstract depictions of Yorkshire moors.

Born in Ilkley, West Yorkshire to Albert and Dorothy (née Sproat) Hyatt, young Derek attended grammar school in his hometown. He then went to Leeds College of Art from 1948 to 1952. Hyatt spent his national service with the Royal Air Force and attended Norwich University of the Arts part-time. The Royal College of Art offered him a scholarship in 1957, and Hyatt became the editor of the college's journal Ark.

He began teaching as a visiting lecturer at the Kingston College of Art in 1954. Hyatt moved back to his native Yorkshire in 1964, to teach at Leeds Beckett University. Later, he moved to Collingham and also owned a farmhouse in Bishopdale. In 1990, Hyatt was named a Companion of the Guild of St George. He was made a member of the International Artists for Nature Foundation in 1995.

His work was exhibited at the Cartwright Hall in Bradford in 2001. Subsequent exhibitions took place at London's Art Space Gallery in 2012 and 2014.

He was married to Rosamond Rockey from 1960 until her death in 2015. They had one daughter, Sally.
