= Richard Clements (painter) =

Australian artist (1951–1999)

Richard Clements (10 August 1951 – 4 November 1999) was an Australian painter.

== Life ==
Clements' early childhood years were spent in Tanybryn in the Otway Ranges, near Apollo Bay. The landscape of the area made a lasting impression on him which is evident in his work. The family moved to Colac, and then—by the time Clements was 12—to Melbourne. As a teenager he discovered a love for classical music, and started playing the piano. He left high school after Form 3 (Year 9), and worked at a variety of jobs including apprenticeships to a butcher and a piano tuner.

In 1969, he travelled widely. He loved the landscapes and people of Afghanistan. In 1972 in Timor he met Larissa Usenko, whom he would later marry. Returning to Melbourne in 1973 he began drawing. In his backpack at the time was a small book of prints by Aubrey Beardsley which he particularly admired. Albrecht Dürer was also a favourite at this time, and inspired many watercolour nature studies.

The landscape of southern Australia was always a source of inspiration for him. In the 1970s he spent much time over a couple of years in a small hut in Marysville, and made several trips to the rugged Cradle Mountain region of Tasmania. Much later, in 1994, after separating from Larissa, he bought a small house in Beech Forest in the Otways. He died in 1999 in Melbourne from complications related to his long term drug and alcohol abuse.

== Work ==
Influences on his work included Caspar David Friedrich and J. M. W. Turner.

== Sources ==
- Der Maler Richard Clements (1951–1999) by Jane Clark in Die Christengemeinschaft – Ausgabe: Juli / August 2004
- Richard Clements: Seeing the Sublime, Hamilton Art Gallery, 2004.
