= Li Ki Sun Bejčková =

Korean painter (1931–1999)

- Born: Li Ki Sun; 19 October 1931; Kaesong, Korea, Empire of Japan
- Died: 23 September 1999 (aged 67); Písek, Czech Republic
- Education: Central Academy of Fine Arts
- Spouse: Jaroslav Bejček (m. 1957)
- Children: 2

Korean name
- Hangul: 이기순
- RR: I Gisun
- MR: I Kisun

Li Ki Sun Bejčková (13 October 1931 – 23 September 1999) was a Korean textile artist active in Czechoslovakia.

== Biography ==
Bejčková was born Li Ki Sun (Korean: 이기순) in 1931 in Kaesong, Korea (present-day North Korea) during Japanese rule. Seriously injured during the Korean War, Bejčková later joined the Korean People's Army (Note: Also cited as the People's Liberation Army.) as a medical student in 1950.

During the time period of 1952 to 1956, Bejčková studied at Central Academy of Fine Arts in Peking where she met her future husband Jaroslav Bejček, a Czech visual artist. Following their marriage in 1957, she and Bejček initially settled in Louka u Litvínova and Most before living in Ústí nad Labem from 1960 onwards.

Primarily creating tapestries and art protis, Bejčková's work combines traditional Korean art and modern art elements. Bejčková often collaborated and exhibited with her husband. In 2012, a book on the duo's respective bodies of work was published in the Czech Republic.

== Personal life ==
In 1957, Bejčková married Jaroslav Bejček with whom she had two children. In her later life, Bejčková lived in Switzerland and South Korea, before settling in Písek, Czech Republic. In 1999, Bejčková died in Písek.
