= Oxford Road, Manchester (painting) =

Painting by Pierre Adolphe Valette

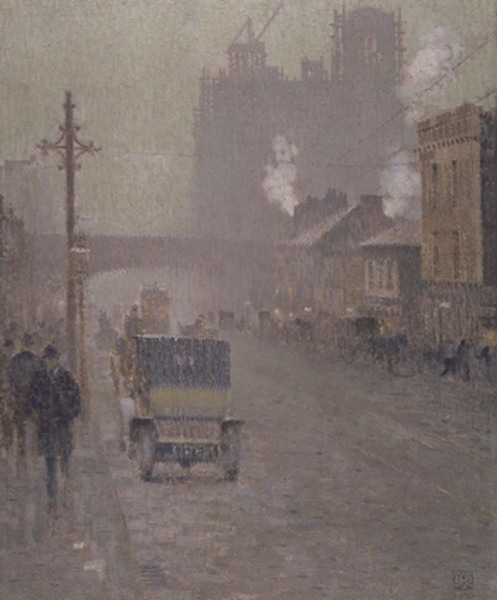
- Artist: Pierre Adolphe Valette
- Year: 1910
- Type: Oil on canvas, landscape painting
- Dimensions: 127.4 cm × 101.5 cm (50.2 in × 40.0 in)
- Location: Manchester Art Gallery, Greater Manchester

Oxford Road, Manchester is a 1910 oil painting by the French artist Pierre Adolphe Valette. A cityscape it depicts a view of Oxford Road on the southern side of the city centre of Manchester. The smog-filled view of shows the Refuge Assurance Building under construction, as well as the railway bridge carrying the line into nearby Manchester Oxford Road station.

Valette was a French Impressionist artist who relocated and spent most of his career in Britain. The picture was first exhibited in Liverpool and received critical praise, encouraging Valette to continue painting similar cityscapes of urban Manchester. The painting is now in the collection of Manchester Art Gallery, which purchased it directly from the artist in 1927.

== Bibliography ==
- Martin, Sandra. Adolphe Valette: A French Influence in Manchester. Manchester City Art Galleries, 1994.
