= Cow's Skull: Red, White, and Blue =

1931 painting by Georgia O'Keeffe

- Artist: Georgia O'Keeffe
- Year: 1931
- Medium: oil paint, canvas
- Dimensions: 101.3 cm (39.9 in) × 91.1 cm (35.9 in)
- Location: Metropolitan Museum of Art
- Accession: 52.203

Cow's Skull: Red, White, and Blue is a painting by American artist Georgia O'Keeffe. It depicts a cow skull centered in front of what appears to be a cloth background. In the center of the background is a vertical black stripe, surrounded by two vertical stripes of white laced with blue. Outside are two vertical red stripes. These three colours represent the American flag to show the strength of the American land during the difficult times between the world wars.

O'Keeffe created the 39 7/8 x 35 7/8-inch (101.3 x 91.1 cm) oil painting on canvas in 1931. Around that time, American artists sought themes for the "Great American Novel" or "Great American Story". It is part of the Alfred Stieglitz Collection (1952) of the Metropolitan Museum of Art.
