= Tal (Rauch) =

Painting by Neo Rauch

- Artist: Neo Rauch
- Year: 1999
- Medium: Oil on canvas
- Dimensions: 200 cm × 250 cm (79 in × 98 in)
- Location: Museum de Fundatie, Zwolle

Tal is an oil on canvas painting by the German artist Neo Rauch, from 1999. It is held in the Museum de Fundatie, in Zwolle.

== Description ==
The canvas depicts two men in boxing shorts and shoes who fight each other with long sticks. In the foreground is a red, wooden manger with the word "Tal", which is German for valley.

== Reception ==
Gregory Volk of Art in America wrote in 2010 that the setting "could be any time in Germany: the late 1990s in some outlying district, the 1960s in the workers' and peasants' DDR, the 1920s before the rise of Nazism". He wrote that this ambiguity is typical for Rauch, whose subjects "might be triggered by details in and around Leipzig, or by childhood memories and, as he has occasionally indicated, dreams, but their reach is into a collective past and toward a speculative future". Volk wrote that the two bare-chested, battling men may be "meant as an ironic send-up of the former East German government's obsession with athleticism as a symbol of socialist prowess—but then again, maybe not. You sense that these two men are destined to battle each other in this idiotic and enervated masculine ritual—or that it's their implacable duty."

== Art market ==
It was sold through Christie's in New York in 2007 for US$768,000 and in 2013 for $749,000. It was acquired by the Museum de Fundatie, in Zwolle, in 2024.
