= Louka u Litvínova =

- Municipality
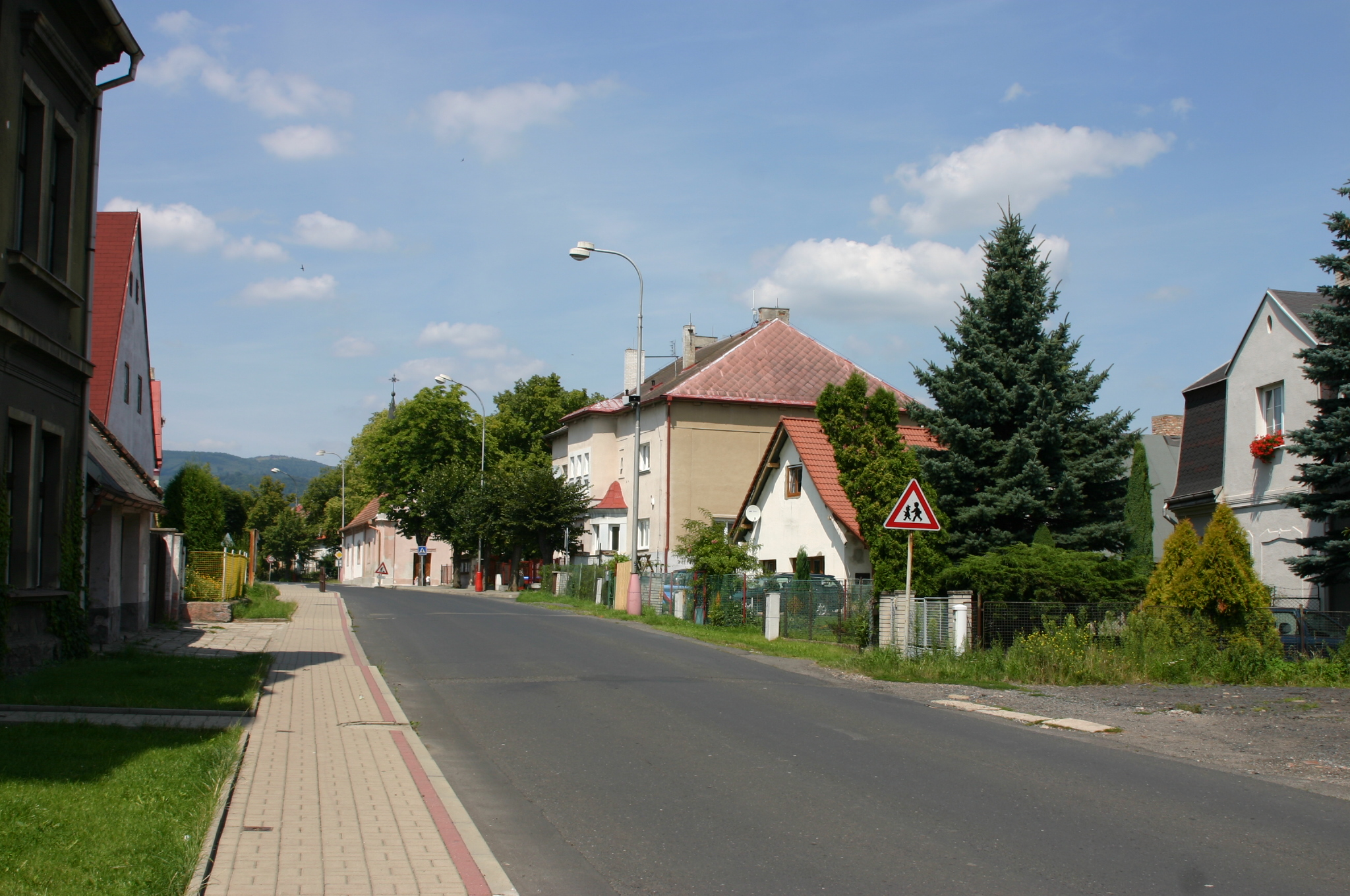
- Main street with the municipal office

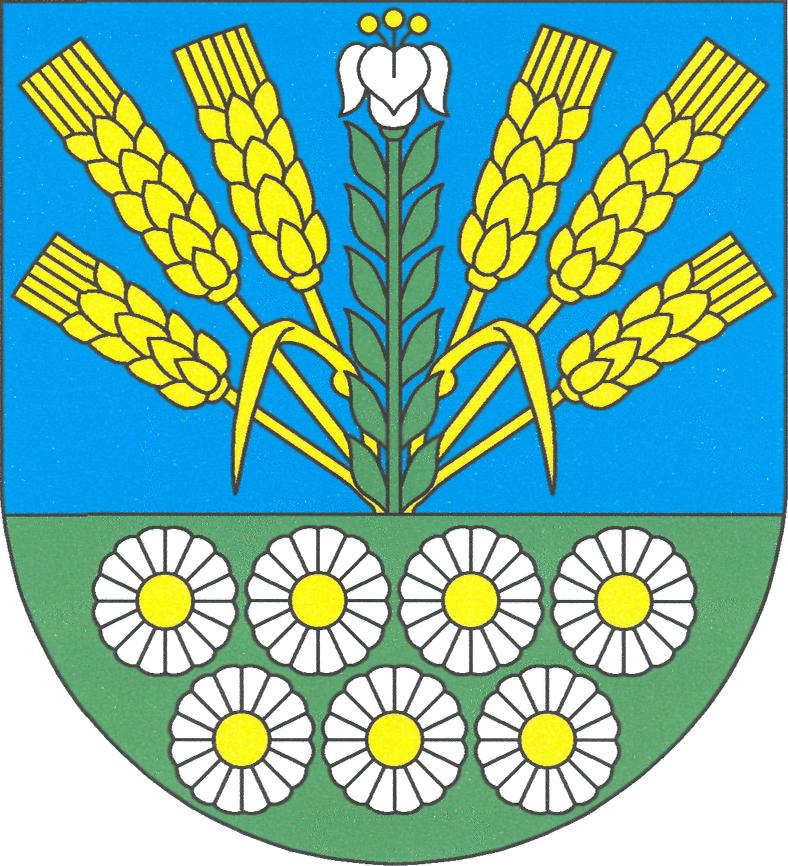
- Flag Coat of arms

- Location in the Czech Republic
- Coordinates: 50°35′17″N 13°38′12″E
- Country: Czech Republic
- Region: Ústí nad Labem
- District: Most
- First mentioned: 1289

Area
  - Total: 2.68 km^{2} (1.03 sq mi)
- Elevation: 287 m (942 ft)

Population (2026-01-01)
  - Total: 734
  - Density: 274/km^{2} (709/sq mi)
- Time zone: UTC+1 (CET)
  - Summer (DST): UTC+2 (CEST)
- Postal code: 435 33
- Website: www.loukaulitvinova.cz

Louka u Litvínova (German: Wiese) is a municipality and village in Most District in the Ústí nad Labem Region of the Czech Republic. It has about 700 inhabitants.

== Etymology ==
The name means 'meadow near Litvínov' in Czech.

== Geography ==
Louka u Litvínova is located about 8 kilometres (5 mi) north of Most and 28 km (17 mi) west of Ústí nad Labem. It lies in the Most Basin. There are several fishponds in the area.

== History ==
The first written mention of Louka u Litvínova is from 1289, when it was owned by the Lords of Rýzmburk, a branch of the Hrabišic family. They sold the village to Margrave William I in 1398 and until the end of the Hussite Wars, the area belonged to Saxony. After that, the village was granted to various nobles as a fief.

In the 17th century, Louka u Litvínova was owned by the Waldstein family. It was an agricultural village until the discovery of lignite and general industrialisation of the region.

== Demographics ==
Historical population

Year	Pop.	±%
1869	357	—
1880	393	+10.1%
1890	535	+36.1%
1900	1,970	+268.2%
1910	2,056	+4.4%

Year	Pop.	±%
1921	1,970	−4.2%
1930	2,105	+6.9%
1950	1,525	−27.6%
1961	1,552	+1.8%
1970	1,303	−16.0%

Year	Pop.	±%
1980	1,013	−22.3%
1991	648	−36.0%
2001	762	+17.6%
2011	681	−10.6%
2021	663	−2.6%

Source: Censuses

== Transport ==
Louka u Litvínova is located on the railway lines Litvínov–Ústí nad Labem and Rakovník–Osek.

== Sights ==
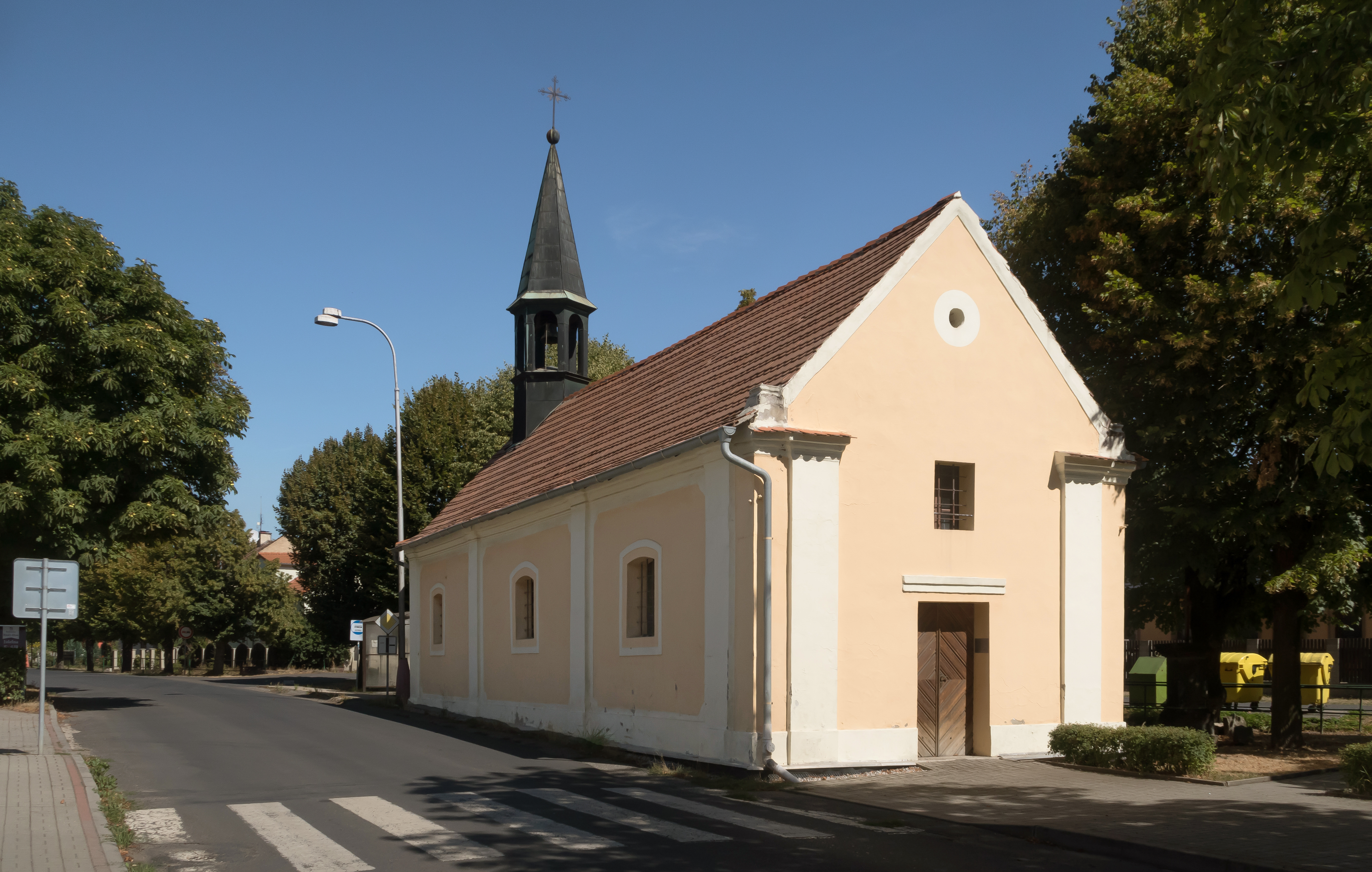
Chapel of Saint Anthony of Padua

The main landmark is the Chapel of Saint Anthony of Padua. It was built in 1834 from the money of local farmers.

== Notable people ==
- Jaroslav Bejček (1926–1986), painter and sculptor
