= Albert Square, Manchester (painting) =

Painting by Pierre Adolphe Valette

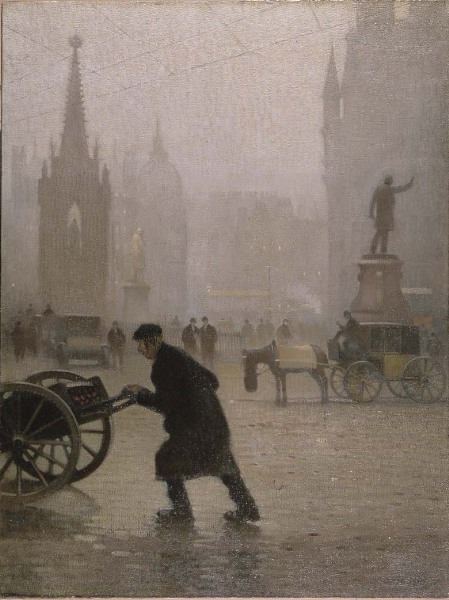
- Artist: Pierre Adolphe Valette
- Year: 1910
- Type: Oil on canvas, landscape painting
- Dimensions: 152 cm × 114 cm (60 in × 45 in)
- Location: Manchester Art Gallery, Greater Manchester

Albert Square, Manchester is a 1910 oil painting by the French artist Pierre Adolphe Valette. It depicts a view of Albert Square in Manchester. Built during the mid-Victorian era the Square is located by Manchester Town Hall and takes its name from Prince Albert the husband of Queen Victoria. Vallete's painting shows several landmarks including the memorial to Albert and a statue of William Ewart Gladstone. Capturing the clash of modern and traditional, the painting includes both a horse and cart and a motor car.

Valette was an artist who painted in the French Impressionist style and is best known for his depictions of the streets of Edwardian Manchester. He taught and mentored the young Lowry. Today the painting is in the collection of Manchester Art Gallery which acquired it in 1928 directly from the artist.

== Bibliography ==
- Martin, Sandra. Adolphe Valette: A French Influence in Manchester. Manchester City Art Galleries, 1994.
- Pipes, Alan. Foundations of Art and Design. Laurence King, 2003.
