= Pierre Adolphe Valette =

French Impressionist painter

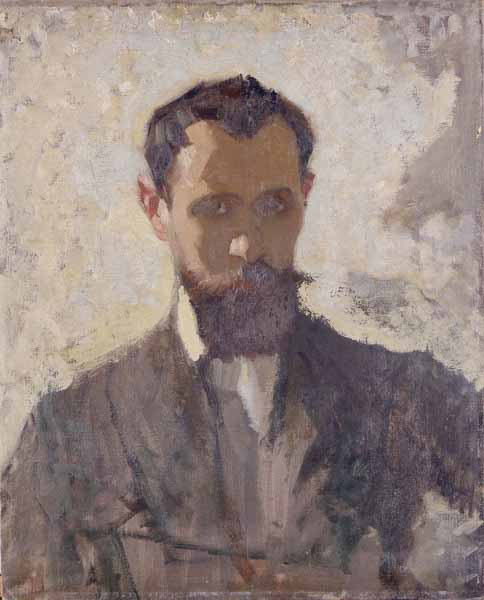
- Self-portrait (1912)
- Born: Pierre Adolphe Valette; October 13, 1876; Saint-Étienne, France
- Died: April 18, 1942 (aged 65); Blacé en Beaujolais, France
- Education: Ecole Municipale de Beaux-Arts et des Arts Decoratifs, Bordeaux; Birkbeck Institute, London.
- Known for: Painting, drawing
- Movement: Impressionism

Pierre Adolphe Valette (13 October 1876 – 18 April 1942) was a French Impressionist painter who spent most of his career in England. His most acclaimed paintings are urban landscapes of Manchester, now in the collection of Manchester Art Gallery. Today, he is chiefly remembered as L. S. Lowry's tutor.

== Life and career ==
Born in Saint-Étienne in eastern central France, on 13 October 1876, he trained at the Ecole Municipale de Beaux-Arts et des Arts Decoratifs in Bordeaux. Valette arrived in England for unknown reasons in 1904 and studied at the Birkbeck Institute, now part of the University of London. In 1905 he travelled to the North West of England where he designed greetings cards and calendars for a Manchester printing company. He attended evening classes at Manchester Municipal School of Art and in 1907 he was invited to join the staff as a teacher.

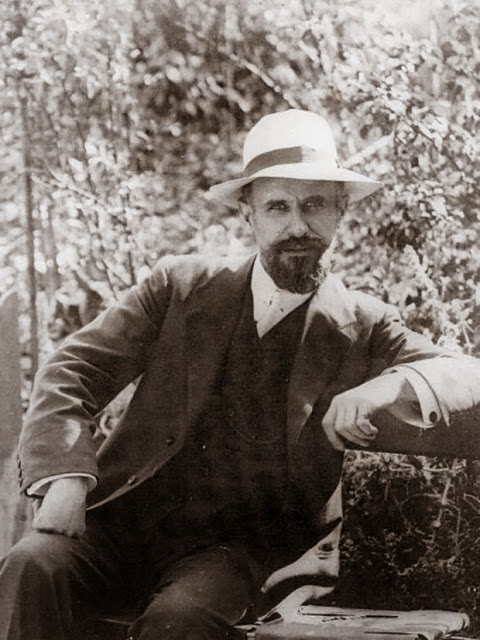
Photograph of Valette (date unknown)

Salford painter L. S. Lowry became a pupil of Valette, and expressed great admiration for his tutor, who taught him new techniques and showed him the potential of the urban landscape as a subject. He called him "a real teacher ... a dedicated teacher" and added: "I cannot over-estimate the effect on me of the coming into this drab city of Adolphe Valette, full of French impressionists, aware of everything that was going on in Paris".

In 1920 Valette resigned from the Institute owing to ill health. He stayed in Lancashire for eight more years, teaching privately and painting in Manchester and Bolton. In 1928 he returned to Paris, and subsequently moved to Blacé en Beaujolais where he died in 1942.

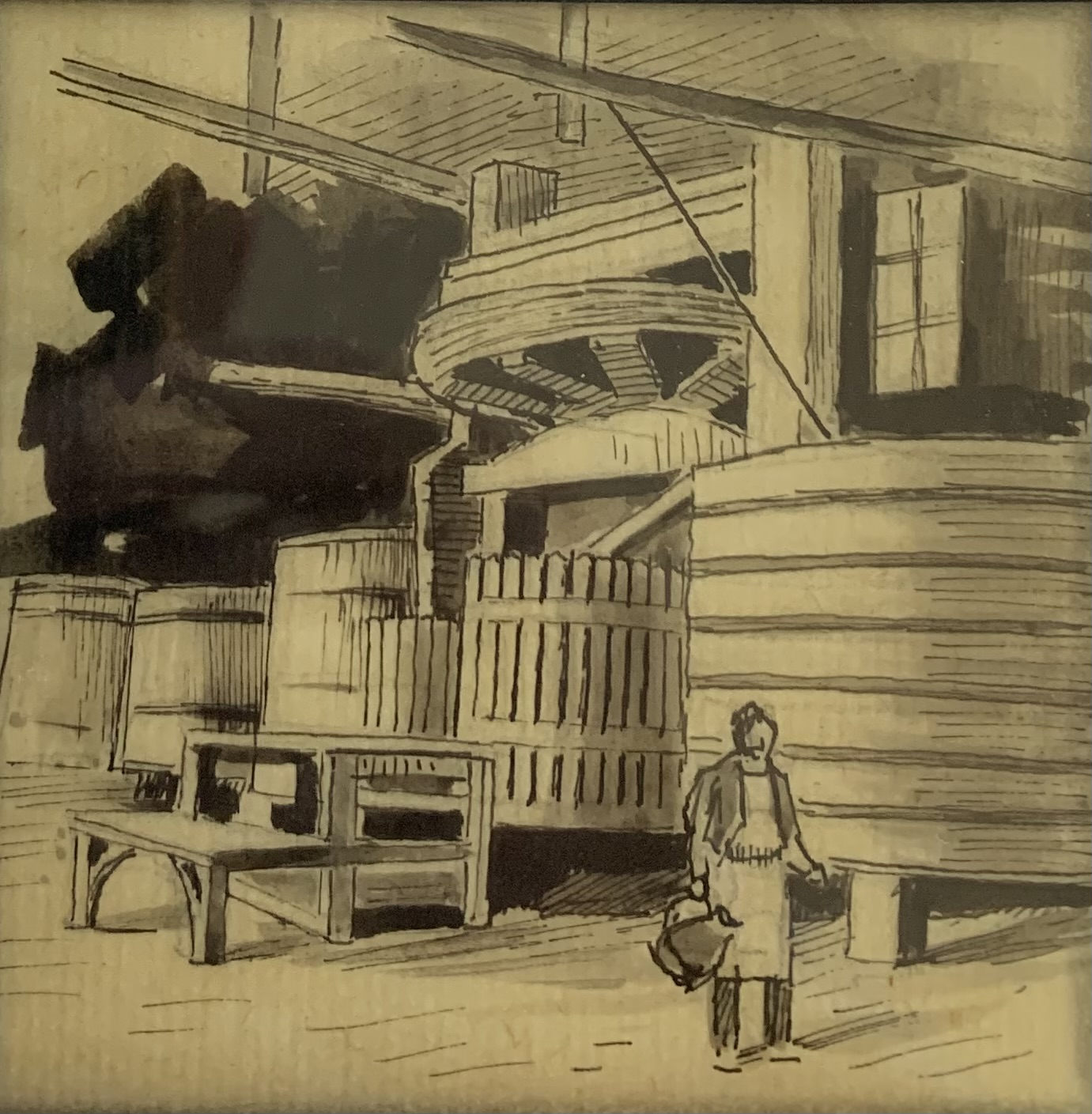
The thirteenth of fourteen Scènes beaujolaises vues par un artiste drawn by Valette

A series of fourteen drawings by Valette, mounted between glass as lantern slides, were used by his second wife to give a lecture in 1945, at Manchester University, about winemaking in Beaujolais.

Valette's paintings are Impressionist. Manchester Art Gallery has a room devoted to him, where the viewer may compare some of his paintings with some of Lowry's, and judge to what extent Lowry's own style was influenced by him and by French Impressionism generally.

The Lowry hosted an exhibition of about 100 works by Valette, alongside works by Lowry, between October 2011 and January 2012. It included paintings of Manchester from Manchester Art Gallery and loans from private owners.

== Legacy ==
There is a commemorative blue plaque to Valette, located on the site on Manchester School of Art on Grosvenor Street, in Manchester, inscribed: Adolphe Valette (1876–1942), French painter and teacher in the School of Art 1907–1920.

== Gallery ==
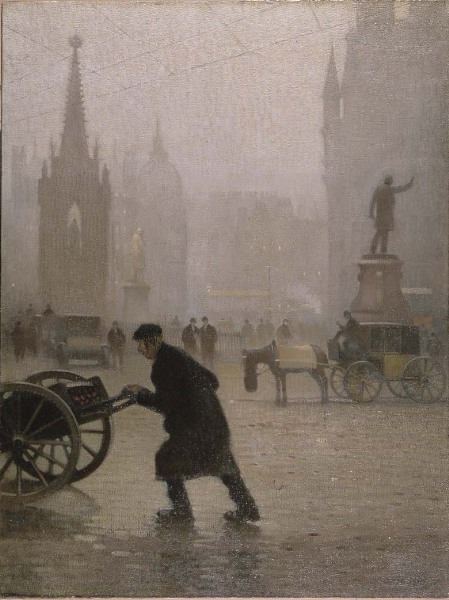
Albert Square, Manchester, 1910

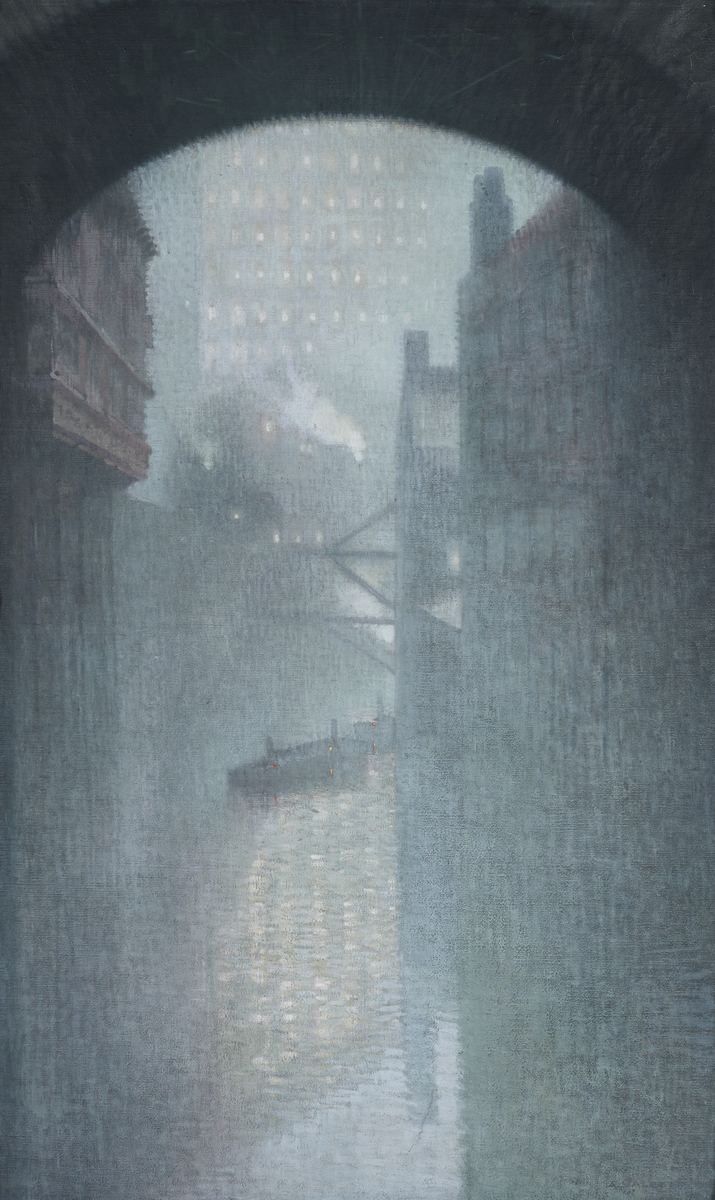
India House

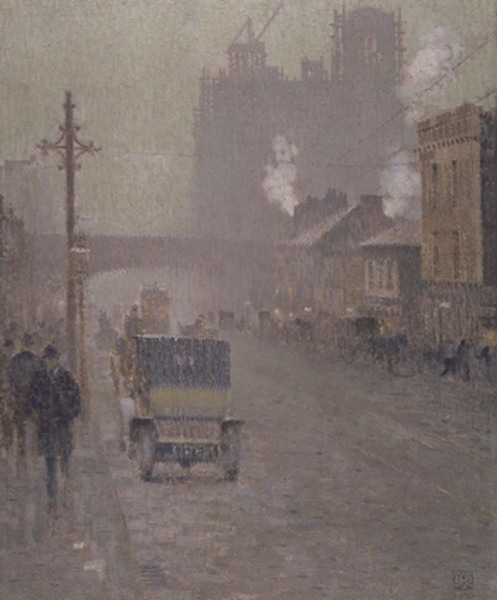
Oxford Road, Manchester, 1910. The Refuge Assurance Building can be seen under construction.

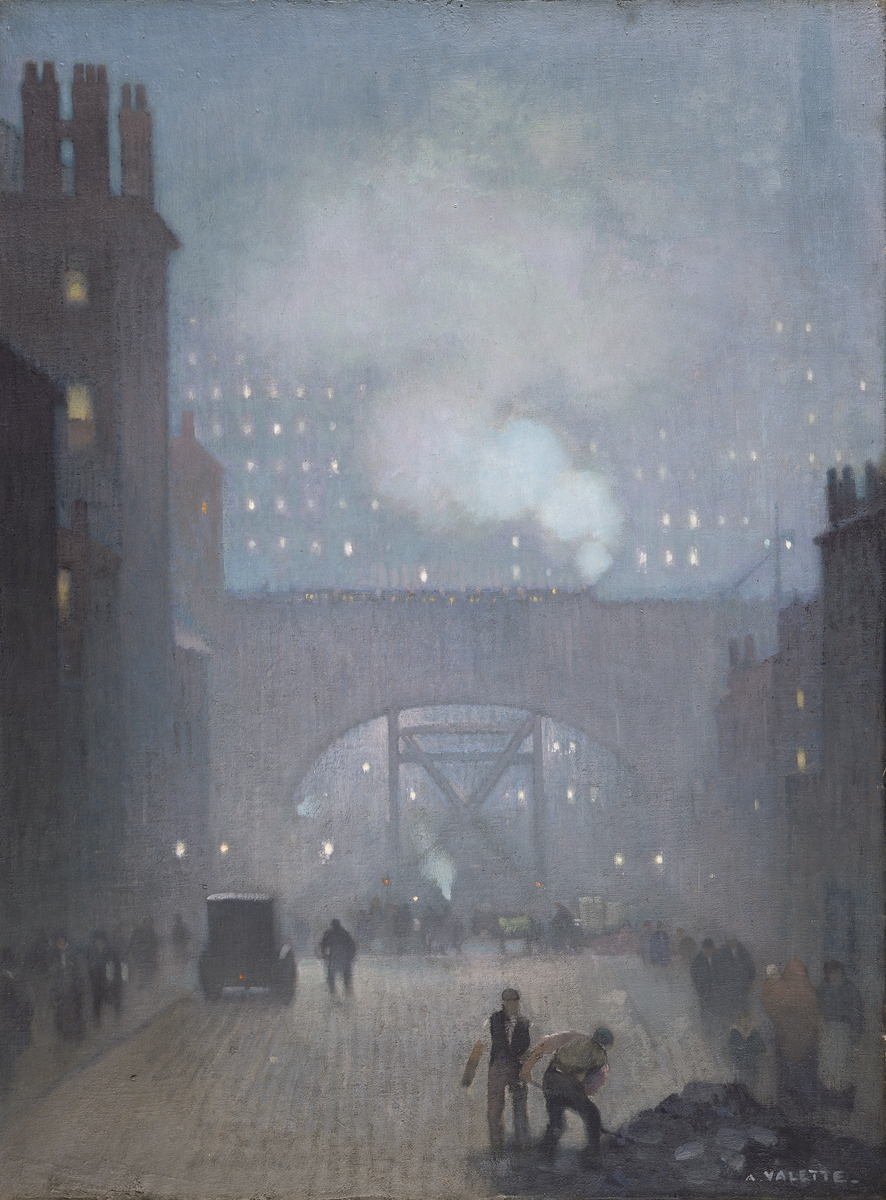
York Street leading to Charles Street
