= 1927 in Belgium =

- Decades: 1900s; 1910s; 1920s; 1930s; 1940s
- See also: Other events of 1927; List of years in Belgium

Events in the year 1927 in Belgium.

== Incumbents ==
Monarch – Albert I
Prime Minister – Henri Jaspar

== Events ==
- 22 January – Funeral of Charlotte of Belgium (former Empress of Mexico) in Laken (Brussels).
- 10 February – League against Imperialism founded at a Congress of Oppressed Peoples in the Egmont Palace, Brussels
- 1 March – Committee for Public Works established.
- 15 September – Belgium loses its seat on the permanent council of the League of Nations.
- October – Fifth International Solvay Conference
- 21 November – Government falls after Socialists question policy on military service.

== Publications ==
- Hendrik de Man, Au-delà du marxisme / Zur Psychologie des Sozialismus
- Willem Elsschot, Lijmen
- Stijn Streuvels, De teleurgang van de Waterhoek

== Art and architecture ==
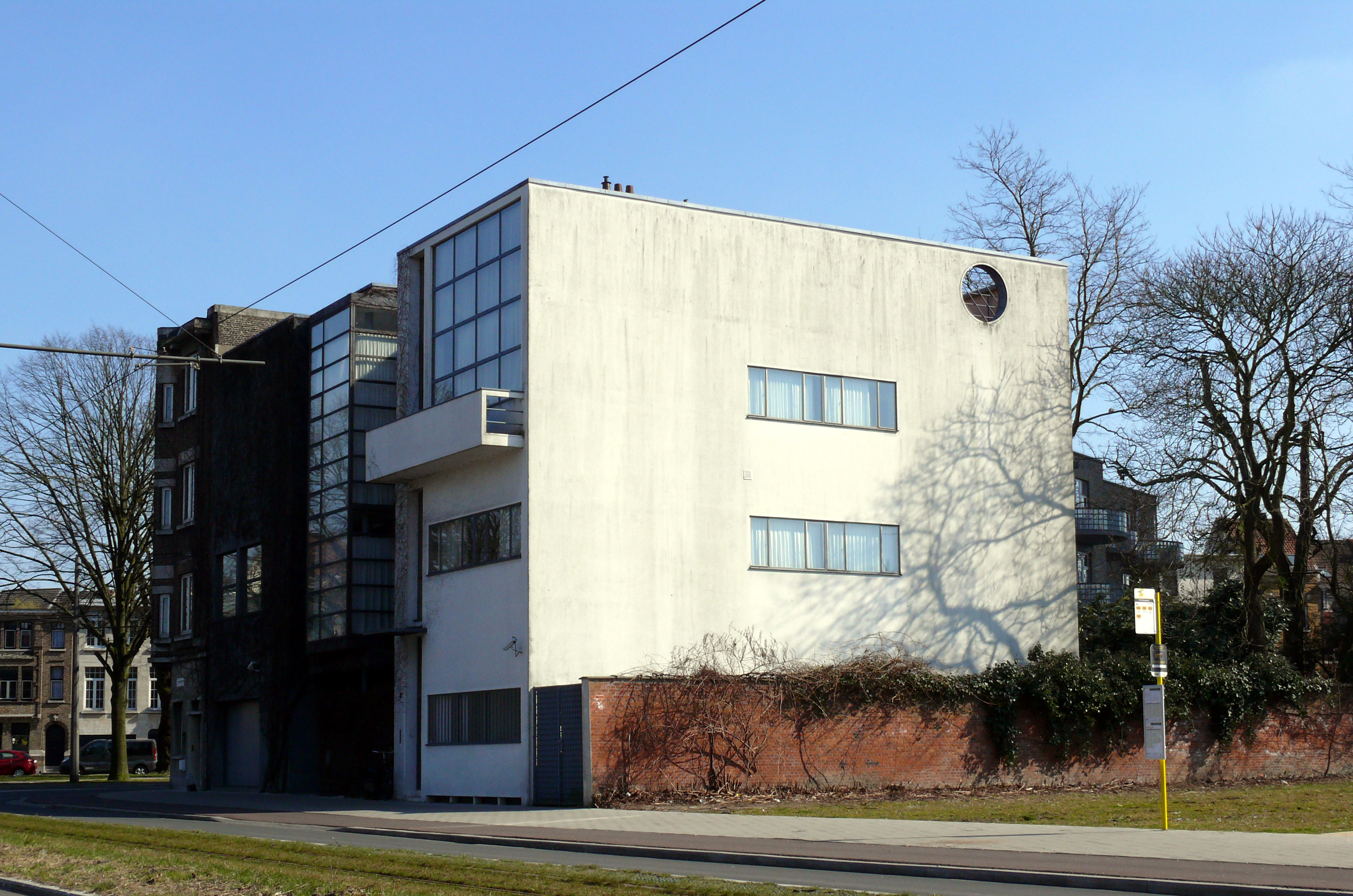
Maison Guiette in Antwerp, designed by Le Corbusier

Buildings

- Le Corbusier, Maison Guiette, Antwerp

Paintings

- René Magritte, The Enchanted Pose; The Meaning of Night; The Menaced Assassin

== Births ==
- 26 January – Victor Mees, footballer (died 2012)
- 30 January – Jef Nys, comics writer (died 2009)
- 28 February – Joseph Noiret, artist (died 2012)
- 9 March — Will Ferdy, singer (died 2022)
- 1 May – Roland Verhavert, film-maker (died 2014)
- 7 May – Luc de Heusch, anthropologist (died 2012)
- 7 July – Henri Dirickx, international footballer (died 2018)
- 8 July – Willy De Clercq, politician (died 2011)
- 1 August – André Cools, politician (died 1991)
- 11 September – Luc Versteylen, Jesuit (died 2021)
- 11 October – Joséphine-Charlotte of Belgium, grand duchess of Luxembourg (died 2005)

== Deaths ==
- 19 January – Charlotte of Belgium (born 1840)
- 6 March – Joseph Bascourt (born 1863), architect
- 4 April
  - Albert Van Coile (born 1900), footballer
  - Auguste Goffinet (born 1857), courtier
- 17 May – Emilius Seghers (born 1855), bishop of Ghent
- 28 May – Théophile Lybaert (born 1848), artist
- 29 May – Georges Eekhoud (born 1854), novelist
- 11 July – Fernand Feyaerts (born 1880), Olympic swimmer
- 30 August – Émile Braun (born 1849), engineer
- 28 October – Oscar Van Den Bossche (born 1893), rower
- 2 November – Rodolphe Wytsman (died 1860), painter
