= 1925 in Belgium =

- Decades: 1900s; 1910s; 1920s; 1930s; 1940s
- See also: Other events of 1925; List of years in Belgium

Events in the year 1925 in Belgium.

== Incumbents ==
Monarch – Albert I
Prime Minister – Georges Theunis (to 13 May); Aloys Van de Vyvere (13 May to 17 June); Prosper Poullet (from 17 June)

== Events ==
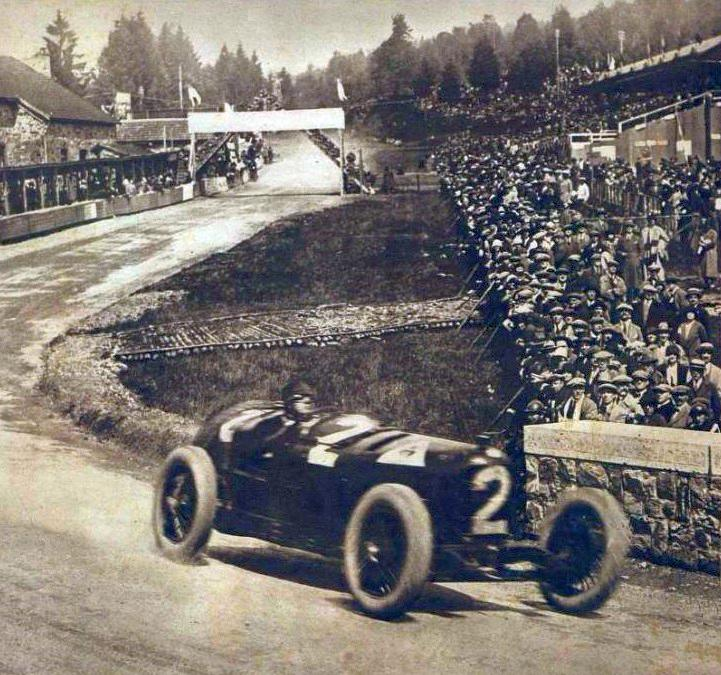
Antonio Ascari wins the first Belgian Grand Prix to be held at Spa-Francorchamps, 28 June 1925

- 6 March – Annexation of Eupen and Malmedy to the Kingdom of Belgium.
- 10 March – Parliament passes a law on the provision of electricity.
- 5 April
  - Legislative elections: Belgian Labour Party and Catholic Party each win 78 seats
  - Henri de Baillet-Latour elected President of the International Olympic Committee
- 23 April – Monument to the Zeebrugge Raid inaugurated by King Albert I.
- 7 June – 14th Gordon Bennett Cup held in Brussels.
- 28 June – Antonio Ascari wins the 1925 Belgian Grand Prix, the first held on the Circuit de Spa-Francorchamps.
- 19 July – Lucien Buysse comes second in the 1925 Tour de France
- 13 October – Gaston-Antoine Rasneur, bishop of Tournai, consecrates the new abbey church of Chimay Abbey.
- 8 November – Provincial elections
- December – Flooding in Charleroi

== Publications ==
- Jean Dominique, Sable sans fleurs
- André Fontaine, L'Art belge
- Frans Masereel, La Ville: cent bois gravés
- Joris Minne, Alphabet
- Herman Teirlinck, De man zonder lijf, with a cover designed by Karel Maes
- Marcel Thiry, Plongeantes proues

== Art and architecture ==
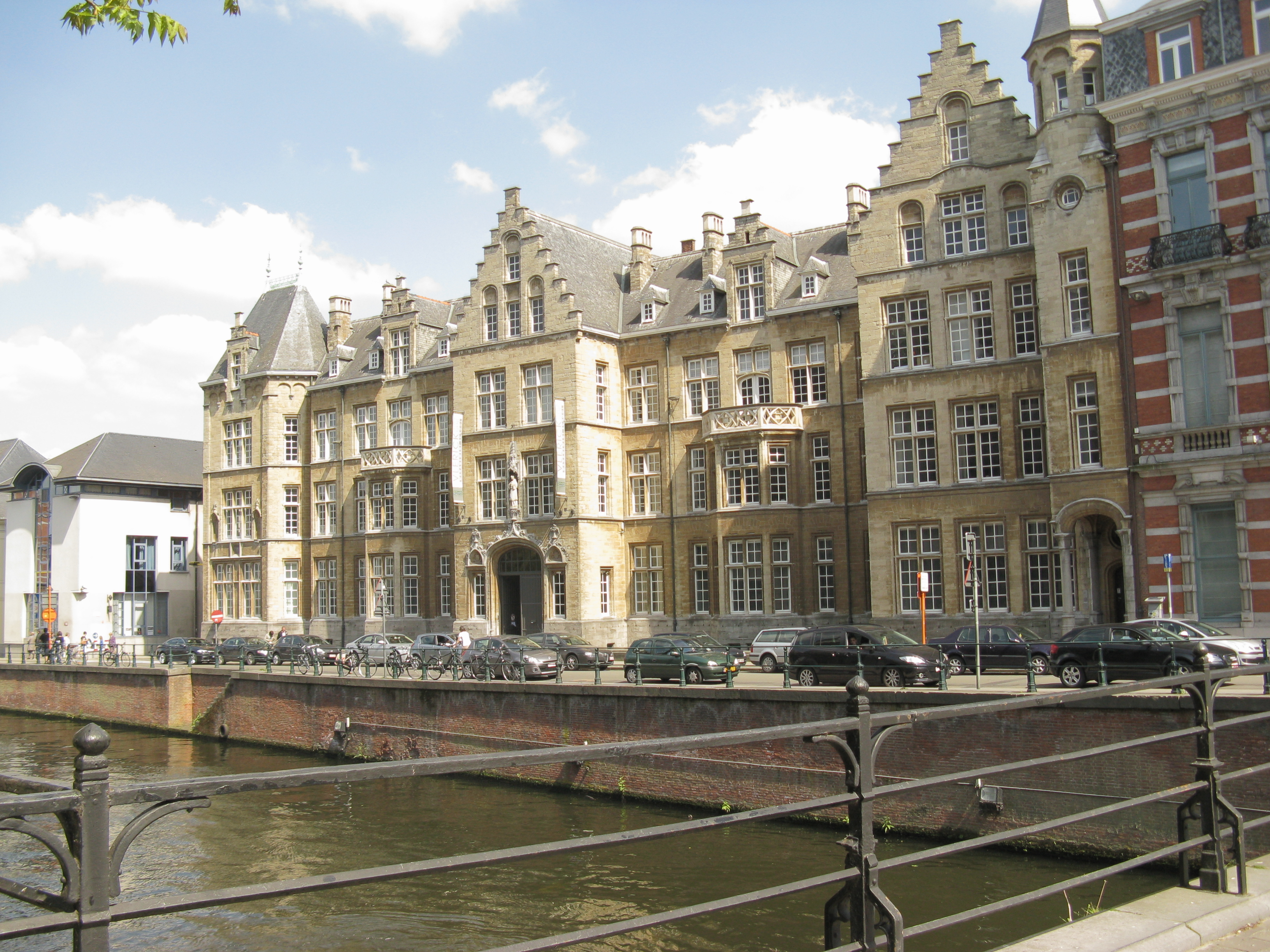
New buildings of the Major Seminary of Ghent (1925)

Buildings

- Major Seminary of Ghent relocates to new buildings (now part of Vlerick Business School)

== Births ==
- 7 January – Louis Carré, footballer (died 2002)
- 26 January — Jean-Marie Ghuysen, chemist (died 2004)
- 31 January – Micheline Lannoy, Olympic figure skater (died 2023)
- 25 February – Gilbert Temmerman, politician (died 2012)
- 8 March – Antoine, 13th Prince of Ligne, aristocrat (died 2005)
- 21 March – Pierre Celis, brewer (died 2011)
- 7 April – Jos De Beukelaere, cyclist (died 1969)
- 9 April – Paula Sémer, broadcaster (died 2021)
- 11 April – Rik Kuypers, film maker (died 2019)
- 8 May
  - Dino Attanasio, comics artist (born in Italy; died 2026)
  - André-Paul Duchâteau, writer (died 2020)
- 16 May – Bobbejaan Schoepen, entertainer (died 2010)
- 25 July – Yolande Uyttenhove, pianist (died 2000)
- 4 September – Leo Apostel, philosopher (died 1995)
- 5 September
  - Robert Schoonjans, runner (died 2011)
  - Jos Vandeloo, writer (died 2015)
- 16 September – José Desmarets, politician (died 2019)
- 25 September – Janine de Greef, Resister (died 2020)
- 6 October – Jean Mathonet, footballer (died 2004)
- 16 October – Karel Dillen, politician (died 2007)
- 25 October – Joseph Michel, politician (died 2016)
- 3 December – Paula Marckx, pilot (died 2020)
- 20 December – Bob de Moor, comics artist (died 1992)

== Deaths ==
- 17 January – Hendrik Geeraert (born 1863), sluice-keeper
- 23 February – Joris Helleputte (born 1852), architect and politician
- 1 March – Philogène Wytsman (born 1866), biologist
- 8 March – Juliette Wytsman (born 1866), painter
- 25 March – Thomas Vinçotte (born 1850), sculptor
- 9 July – Flavie Van den Hende (born 1865), cellist
- 16 August – Jean Massart (born 1865), botanist
- 9 September – Eugène Goblet d'Alviella (born 1846), politician
