= 1922 in Belgium =

- Decades: 1900s; 1910s; 1920s; 1930s; 1940s
- See also: Other events of 1922; List of years in Belgium

Events in the year 1922 in Belgium.

== Incumbents ==
Monarch – Albert I
Prime Minister – Georges Theunis

== Publications ==
- Georges Dansaert, Les anciennes faïences de Bruxelles. Histoire – fabrication – produits (Brussels and Paris, G. Van Oest)
- Maurice De Wulf, Philosophy and Civilization in the Middle Ages (Princeton University Press)

Series

- Annales de l'Académie royale d'archéologie de Belgique, 6th series, vol. 10.

Periodicals

- Avant-garde art magazine 7 Arts begins publication

== Art and architecture ==
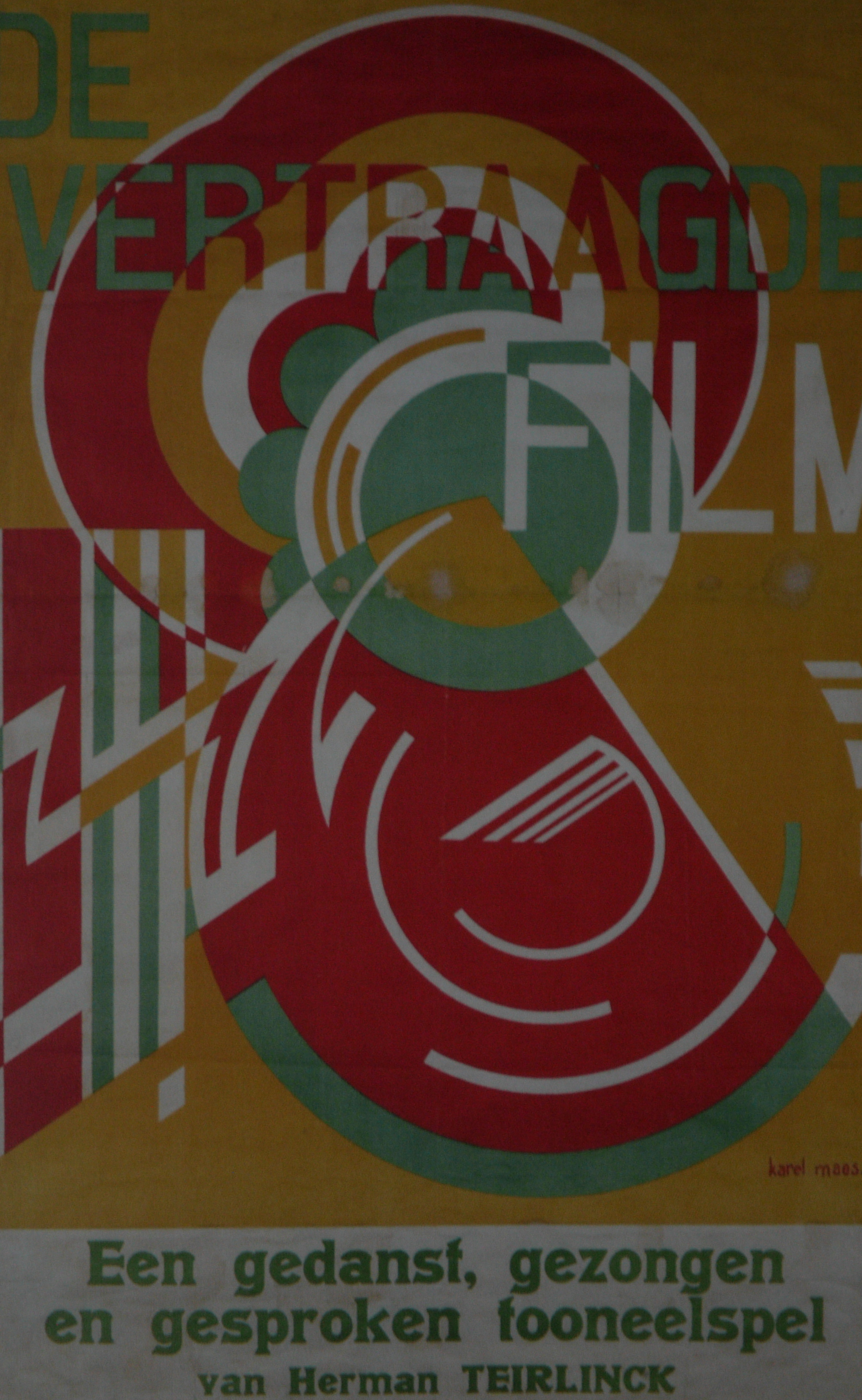
Karel Maes, Poster for Herman Teirlinck's play De vertraagde film (1922)

- Karel Maes, Poster for Herman Teirlinck's play De vertraagde film

== Births ==
- 5 September – Andrée Dumon, resister (died 2025)

== Deaths ==
- 22 March – Frans Jozef Peter van den Branden (born 1837), writer
- 28 July – Charles Moeller (born 1838), historian
- 15 September – Émile Coppieters (born 1849), politician
- 22 November – Louise De Hem (born 1866), painter
