= 1926 in Belgium =

- Decades: 1900s; 1910s; 1920s; 1930s; 1940s
- See also: Other events of 1926; List of years in Belgium

Events in the year 1926 in Belgium.

== Incumbents ==
Monarch – Albert I
Prime Minister – Prosper Poullet (to 8 May); Henri Jaspar (from 20 May)

== Events ==
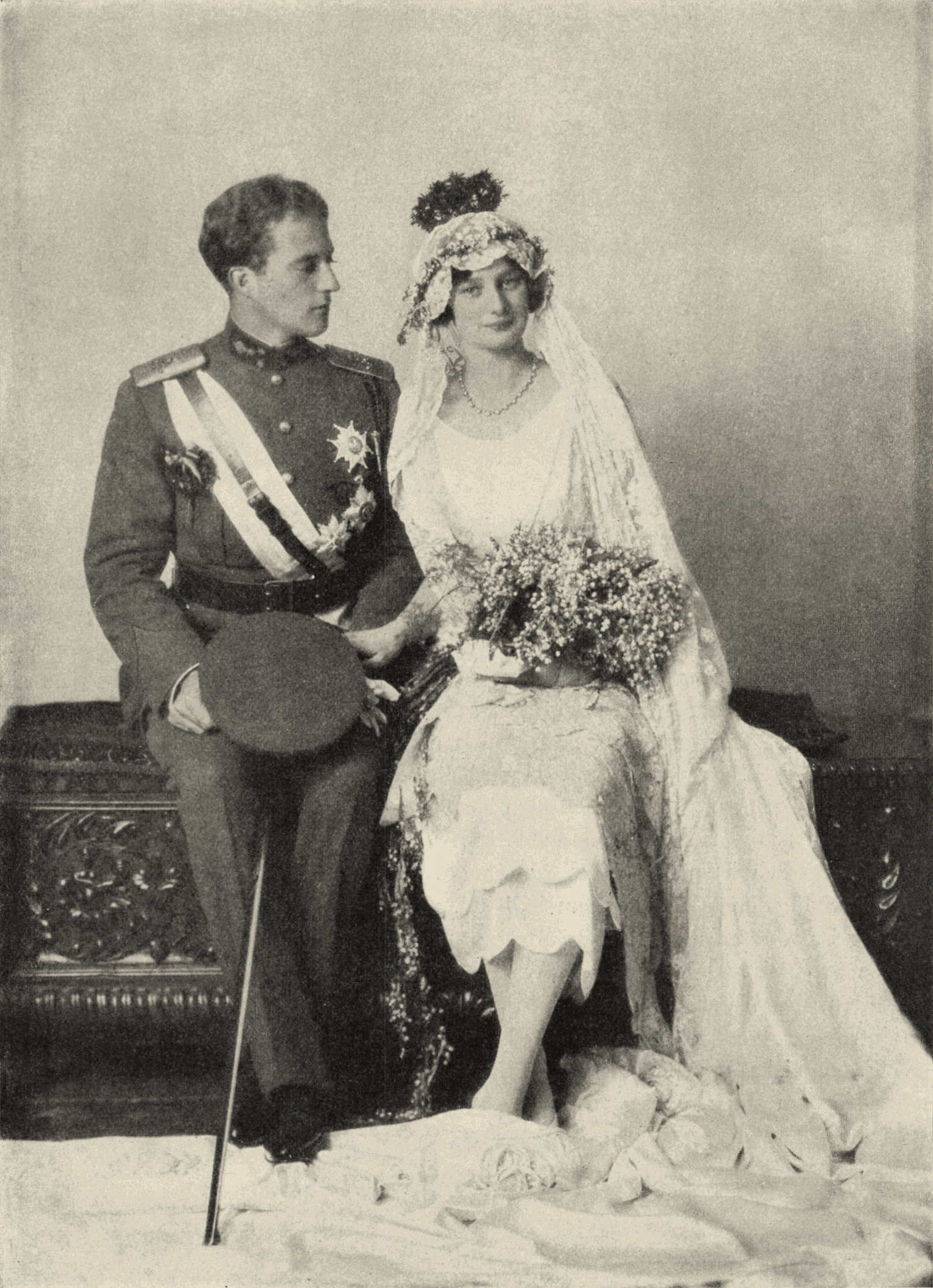
Wedding of Leopold and Astrid in Stockholm, 4 November

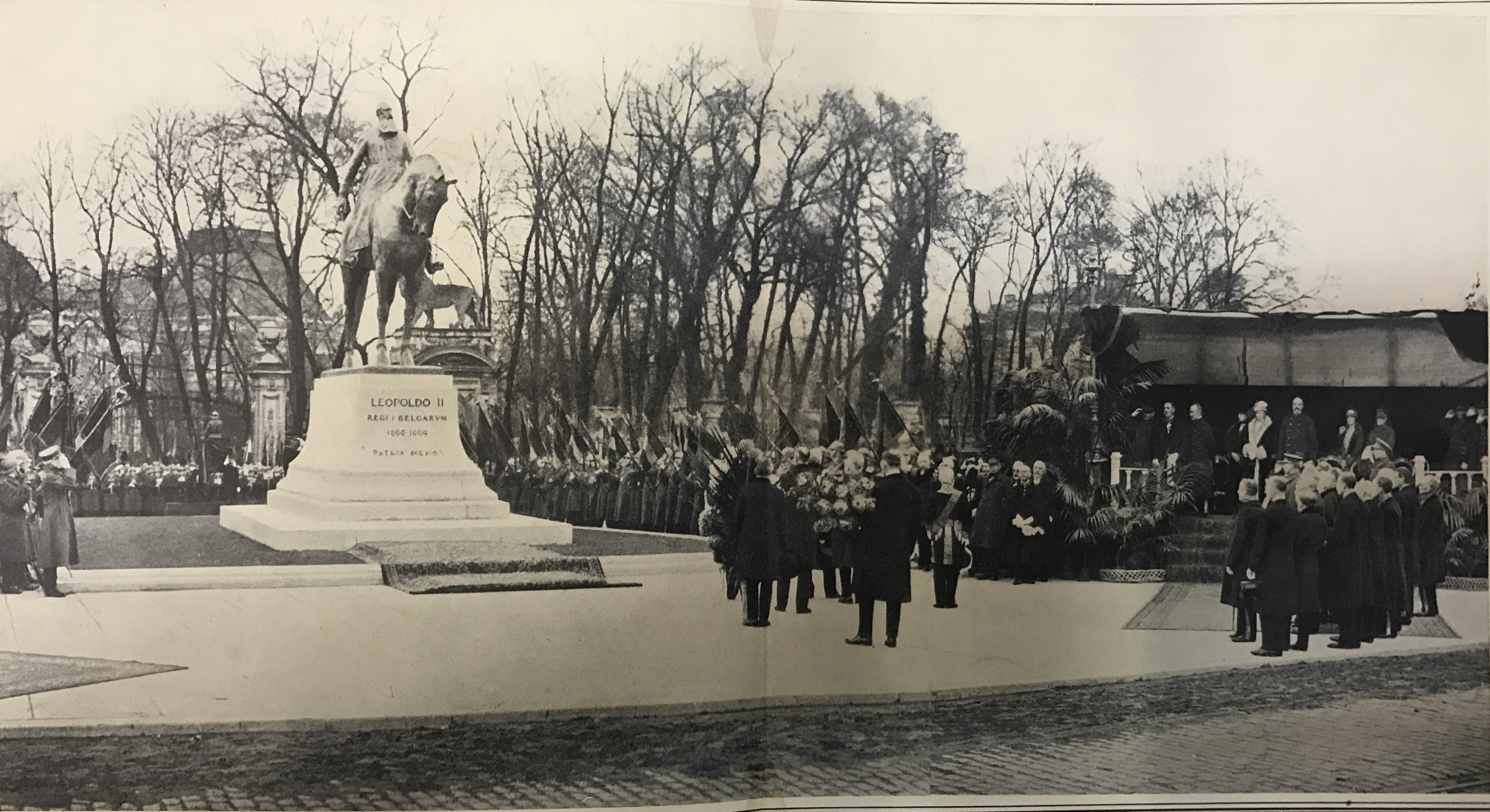
Inauguration of the equestrian statue of Leopold II in Brussels

- Refoundation of Orval Abbey
- 7 January – Flooding along the river Meuse, particularly in Liège.
- 21 January – The Belgian Parliament accepts the Locarno Treaties.
- 31 January – Belgian troops withdraw from German occupation zone.
- 8 May – Government led by Prosper Poullet falls.
- 20 May – Government of national unity formed under Henri Jaspar.
- 30 May – 15th Gordon Bennett Cup held in Antwerp.
- 23 July – National Railway Company of Belgium founded.
- 10 October – Municipal elections
- 20 October – Treaty establishing free movement of labour between Belgium and Luxembourg signed at Luxembourg.
- 4 November – Civil registration of wedding between Prince Leopold of Belgium, Duke of Brabant and Princess Astrid of Sweden in Stockholm
- 10 November – Blessing of the union of Prince Leopold and Princess Astrid in Brussels minster.
- 15 November – Inauguration of the equestrian statue of Leopold II in Brussels.

== Publications ==
- Albert Giraud, Le Concert dans le musée
- Franz Hellens, Le Naïf

== Art and architecture ==
=== Buildings ===
- Le Corbusier, Maison Guiette, Antwerp

=== Film ===
- De Boma à Tshela, a documentary silent film

== Births ==
- 4 February – Albert Frère, businessman (died 2018)
- 20 February – Bobby Jaspar, jazz saxophonist (died 1963)
- 27 February – Luc Alfons de Hovre, bishop (died 2009)
- 21 March – André Delvaux, film director (died 2002)
- 14 April – Henri Kichka, Holocaust survivor (died 2020)
- 15 June – Louis Devos, opera singer and educator (died 2015)
- 26 June – Paul Sobol, Holocaust survivor (died 2020)
- 5 July – Éliane Vogel-Polsky, lawyer and feminist (died 2015)
- 14 July – Guy Vandenbranden, artist (died 2014)
- 16 July – Emile Degelin, film director and novelist (died 2017)
- 27 August – Paula D'Hondt, politician
- 29 August – Jean Bourguignon, inventor (died 1981)
- 12 September – Paul Janssen, pharmacologist (died 2003)
- 29 October – Maurice Blomme, cyclist (died 1980)
- 30 October – Jacques Swaters, racing driver (died 2010)

== Deaths ==
- 23 January – Désiré-Joseph Mercier (born 1851), cardinal
- 2 December – Gérard Cooreman (born 1852), prime minister
- 14 December – Théo van Rysselberghe (born 1862), painter
- 16 December – Hippolyte Fierens-Gevaert (born 1870), art historian
- 27 December – François Poels (born 1881), trade unionist
