= Jozef Peeters =

Belgian painter, engraver and graphic artist (1895–1960)

- Born: 1895; Antwerp, Belgium
- Died: 1960 (aged 64–65); Belgium

Fantaisie (1919), ink and watercolor by Peeters

Jozef Peeters (1895–1960) was a Belgian painter, engraver and graphic artist.

In 1913, Jozef Peeters attended for a short time the Antwerp Royal Academy of Fine Arts, but was mainly interested in his own experiments. In 1914 he started painting luminist landscapes and portraits. From 1915 to 1917 he turned to symbolistic works inspired by theosophy.

In 1918 he met Filippo Tommaso Marinetti, who convinced him to join the futurist movement. With Edmond Van Dooren and Jan Cockx, Jozef Peeters established the "Modern Art" group in September 1918. The group was able to establish international contacts with the "Der Sturm" Gallery in Germany. It also organized three art congresses with exhibitions.

In 1920, Jozef Peeters presented his first abstract painting. He is considered to be, next to Karel Maes, one of the first Belgian abstract painters. The next year he published his first album with six linocuts. Jozef Peeters also participated in several international art exhibitions, including the International exhibition in Geneva (1921) and the First exhibition of modern art in Bucharest (1924).

In 1924, he worked on the interior decoration and designed the furniture for his new house.

Jozef Peeters was also committed to art publications. In 1921, in cooperation with Geert Pijnenburg and Michel Seuphor, he published the Het Overzicht (The Panorama) in Antwerp. In April 1925, Jozef Peeters created the De Driehoek (The Triangle) magazine, supporting constructivist art.

In 1930 Peeters gave up painting and all other artistic activities.
