= 1920 in Belgium =

- Decades: 1900s; 1910s; 1920s; 1930s; 1940s
- See also: Other events of 1920; List of years in Belgium

Events in the year 1920 in Belgium.

== Incumbents ==
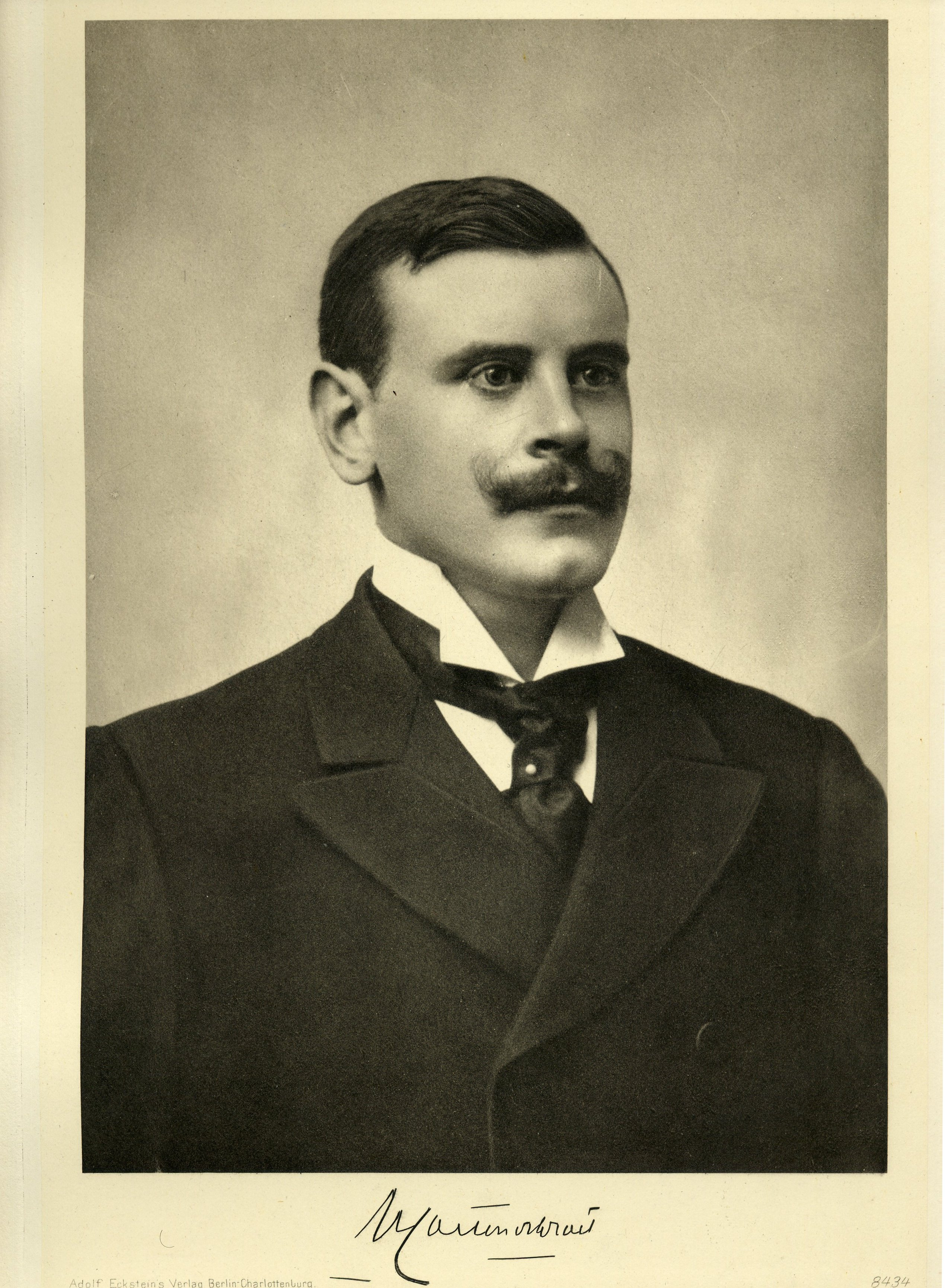
Henry Carton de Wiart, Prime Minister of Belgium 1920–1921

Monarch – Albert I
Prime Minister – Léon Delacroix (to 20 November); Henry Carton de Wiart (from 20 November)

== Events ==
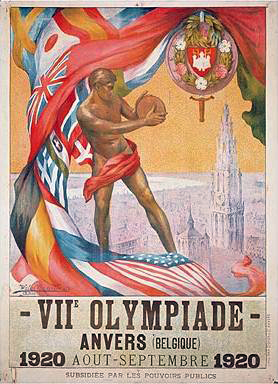
Poster for the Antwerp Olympics

- 11 February – Colonial University of Belgium founded.
- 9 April – The Times publishes a special "Belgian number" (pages 33-54) with contributions by many prominent Belgians.
- 11 May – King Albert and Queen Elisabeth attend the London wedding of Oswald Mosley and Lady Cynthia Curzon.
- 15 May – Colonial Exhibition opens in Antwerp.
- 29 July – World War I veterans storm the Palace of the Nation (Parliament building), demanding the government hear their demands for compensation.
- 14 August to 12 September – 1920 Summer Olympics held in Antwerp.
- 7 September – Franco-Belgian Accord for mutual defence signed.
- 23 October – Ernest Demuyter and Mathieu Labrousse win the 9th Gordon Bennett Cup in Birmingham, Alabama

== Publications ==
- The Yser and the Belgian Coast (Clermont-Ferrand, Michelin)
- André Baillon, Moi quelque part... (Brussels, Soupente)
- George Wharton Edwards, Belgium Old & New (Penn Publishing Company)
- Charlotte Kellogg, Bobbins of Belgium: A Book of Belgian Lace (New York and London, Funk & Wagnalls)
- Charlotte Kellogg, Mercier, the Fighting Cardinal of Belgium (New York and London, D. Appleton and Company)
- A. R. Hope Moncrieff, Belgium Past and Present: The Cockpit of Europe (London, A. & C. Black)
- G. W. Prothero, Question of the Scheldt (London, H.M. Stationery Office)
- Herman Vander Linden, Belgium: The Making of a Nation (Oxford, The Clarendon Press)
- Brand Whitlock, Belgium: A Personal Narrative (New York, D. Appleton)

== Births ==
- 25 January – Jeanne Brabants, dancer (died 2014)
- 1 May – Jacques Stiennon, historian (died 2012)
- 18 June – Aster Berkhof, writer (died 2020)
- 3 July – Eddy Paape, cartoonist (died 2012)
- 6 August – Jean de Heinzelin de Braucourt, geologist (died 1998)
- 18 August – Marcella Pattyn, Beguine (died 2013)
- 5 September – Jean Tordeur, writer (died 2010)
- 15 September — Luc Gillon, priest-scientist (died 1998)
- 21 October – Arnold Boghaert, bishop (died 1993)
- 12 November – Yvonne Vandekerckhove, swimmer (died 2012)
- 11 December – Alfons Van Uytven, trade unionist (died 2008)
- 20 December – Helene Moszkiewiez, resister (died 1998)

== Deaths ==
- 27 March – Henriette Mayer van den Bergh (born 1838), art collector
- 30 April – Charles van Rysselberghe (born 1850), architect
- 25 June – Amadeus de Bie (born 1844), Cistercian abbot
- 13 December – Oswald Orth (born 1832), literary scholar
