= 1924 in Belgium =

- Decades: 1900s; 1910s; 1920s; 1930s; 1940s
- See also: Other events of 1924; List of years in Belgium

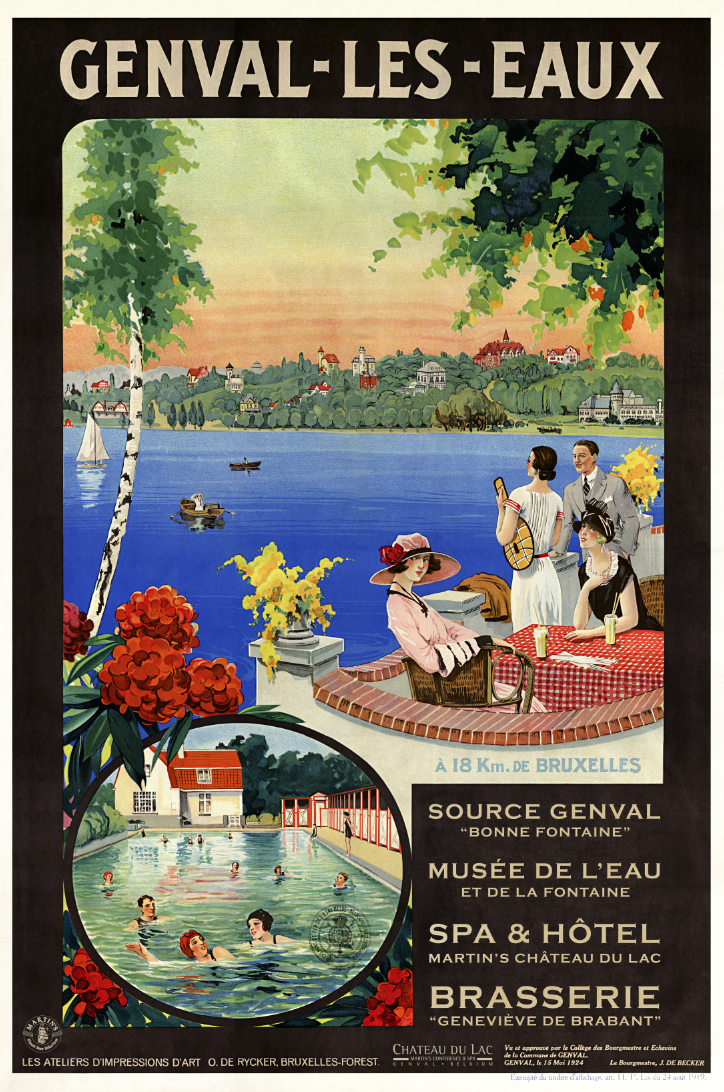
A 1924 tourism poster for Genval

Events in the year 1924 in Belgium.

== Incumbents ==
Monarch – Albert I
Prime Minister – Georges Theunis

== Events ==
- 15 June – 13th Gordon Bennett Cup held in Brussels

== Publications ==
- Willem Elsschot, Lijmen
- Félix Magnette, Précis d'histoire liégeoise

== Art and architecture ==
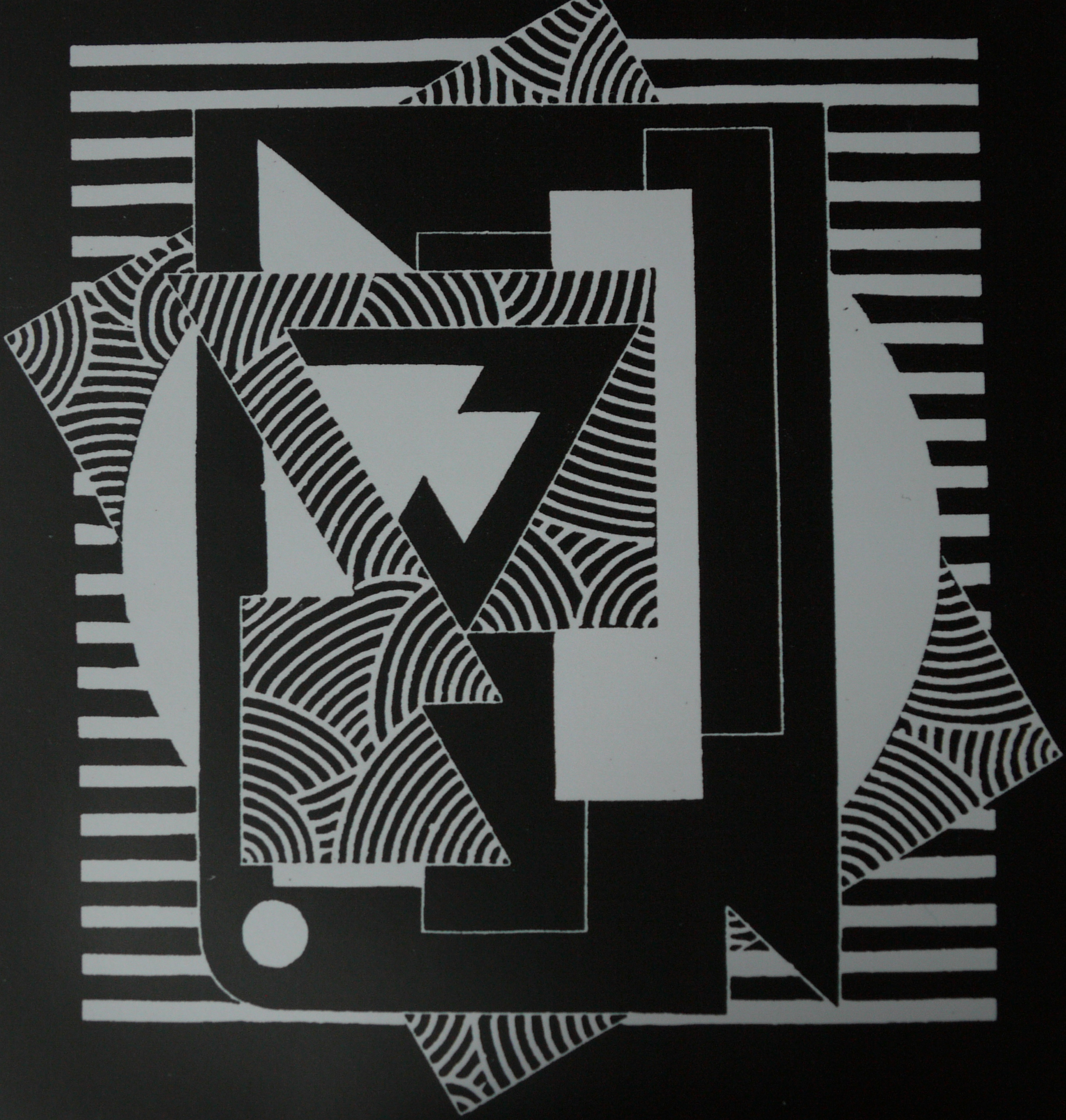
Karel Maes, Abstract linotype (1924)

== Births ==
- 3 April – Jacky June, jazz musician (d. 2012)
- 23 May – Arnaud Fraiteur, resistance fighter (d. 1943)
- 26 October – Constantin Brodzki, architect (d. 2021)

== Deaths ==
- 29 May – Amedée Visart de Bocarmé (b. 1835), politician
- 14 June – Emile Claus, Belgian painter (b. 1849)
