= Het Overzicht =

Dutch-language literary magazine in Belgium (1921–1925)

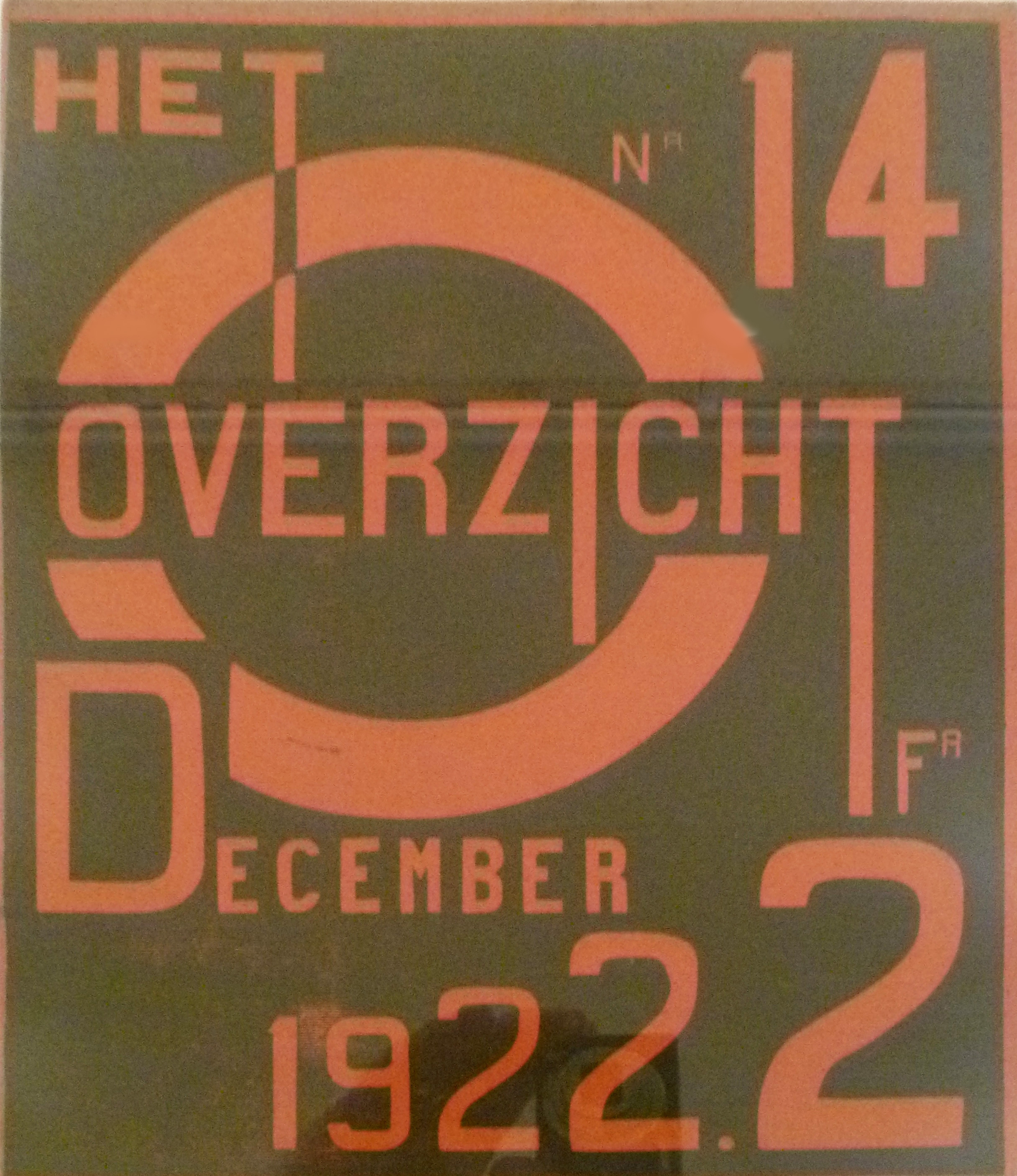
- Het Overzicht n° 14 (December 1922)
- Editor: Michel Seuphor; Jozef Peeters
- Categories: Literary magazine
- Founder: Michel Seuphor
- First issue: June 1921
- Final issue: February 1925
- Country: Belgium
- Based in: Antwerp
- Language: Dutch
- OCLC: 5787201

Het Overzicht (Dutch: the Survey or the Overview) was a Dutch language literary magazine published in Antwerp, Belgium, between 1921 and 1925. Until its cessation in 1925 it was the major avant-garde magazine in the country and published a total of 24 issues.

== History and profile ==
Het Overzicht was first published in June 1921. The magazine was subtitled as Half-Maandelijks Tijdschrift: Kunst, Letteren, Mensheid. Michel Seuphor was the founder of the magazine. Geert Pynenburg was also functional in the foundation. Its headquarters was in Antwerp.

During its early years Het Overzicht was pro-Flemish. Then it became a modernist periodical of European stature and adopted a constructivist, dadaist and avant-garde approach. It published poems in their original languages. The magazine published a special issue on Italian futurism in December 1922. Michel Seuphor and Jozef Peeters were the editors of Het Overzicht of which regular contributors included Geert Grub, Georges Walz, Alice Nahon, Victor Brunclair, Leo Steiner, Gaston Burssens and Michel Seuphor. Some covers were designed by Karel Maes.

The last issue of Het Overzicht was published in February 1925. All issues of the magazine are archived in the Middelheim Museum, Antwerp.

== See also ==
- List of magazines in Belgium
