= Lybaert =

Lybaert is a Dutch-language surname. Notable people with the surname include:

- Marijn Lybaert, Belgian professional Magic: The Gathering player
- Théophile Lybaert (1848–1927), Belgian painter and sculptor
