= 1923 in Belgium =

- Decades: 1900s; 1910s; 1920s; 1930s; 1940s
- See also: Other events of 1923; List of years in Belgium

Events in the year 1923 in Belgium.

== Incumbents ==
Monarch – Albert I
Prime Minister – Georges Theunis

== Events ==
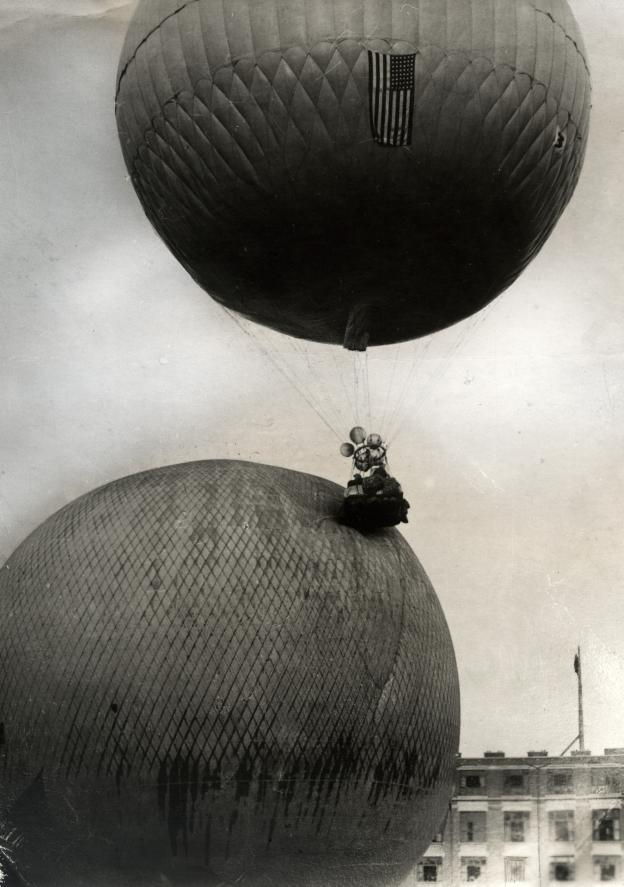
Two balloons collide during the Gordon Bennett Cup in Brussels

- 23 May – Sabena is founded at Brussels Airport
- 23 September – 12th Gordon Bennett Cup held in Brussels

== Publications ==
Periodicals

- Annales de la Société d'archéologie de Bruxelles, vol. 31.
- Annales de la Société d'émulation de Bruges: revue trimestrielle pour l'étude de l'histoire et des antiquités de la Flandre, vol. 66.

Books

- Jean Haust, Étymologies wallonnes et françaises (Liège and Paris, H. Vaillant-Carmanne and Édouard Champion)
- Maurits Sabbe, Christopher Plantin, translated by Alice Van Riel-Göransson (Antwerp, J.-E. Buschmann)
- Camille Tihon, La Principauté et le Diocèse de Liège sous Robert de Bergues, 1557-1564 (Université de Liège)

== Art and architecture ==
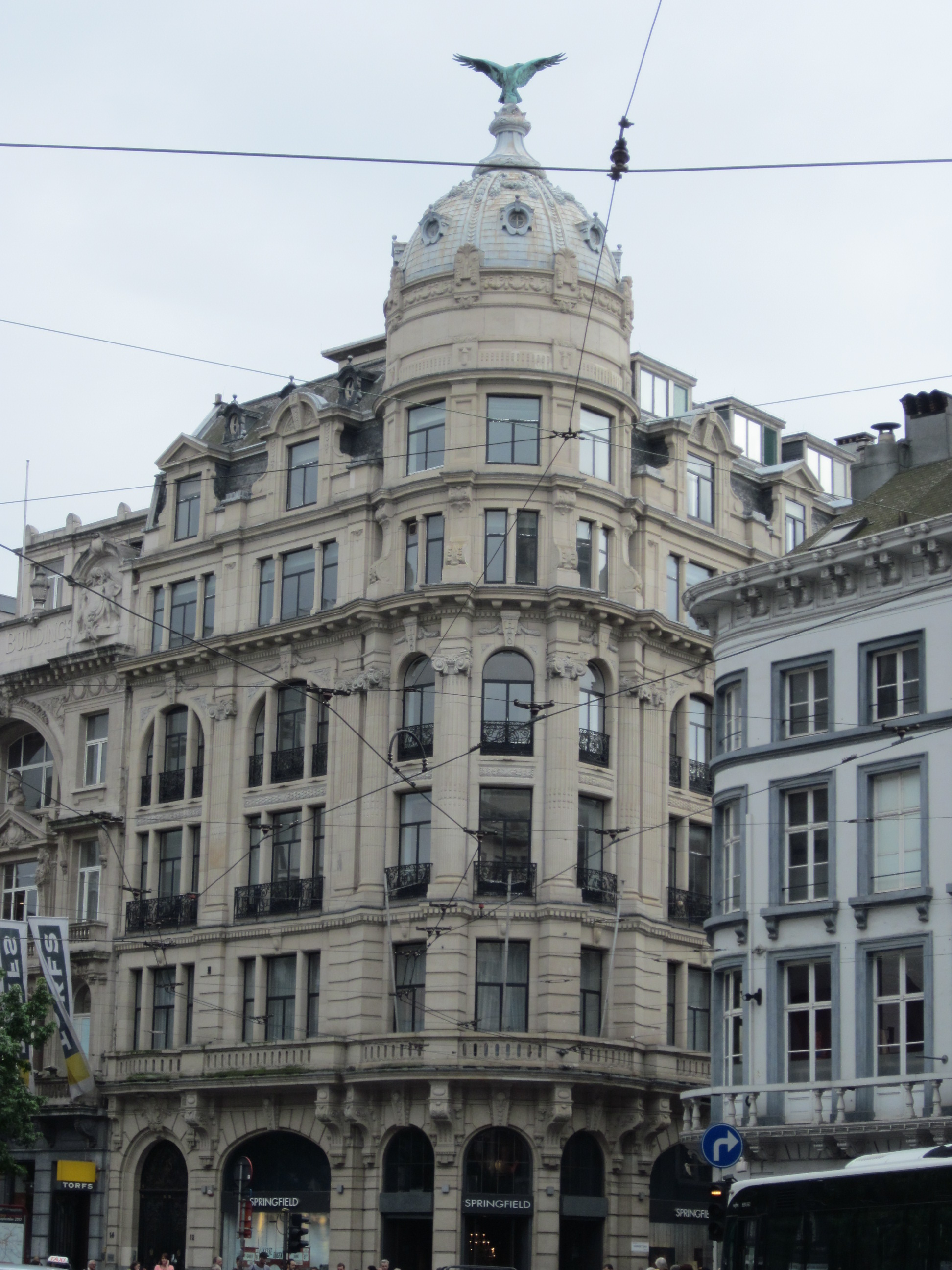
British Dominions House, Antwerp

Buildings

- Eagle, Star & British Dominions Insurance Company office building ("British Dominions House") in Antwerp
- Work starts on Victor Horta's Palace of Fine Arts in Brussels (completed 1929)

Paintings

- Gustave De Smet, De mosseleters (Royal Museum of Fine Arts Antwerp)

== Births ==
- 2 April – Georges Octors, conductor (died 2020)

== Deaths ==
- 12 August – Victor Harou, explorer (born 1851)
- 1 December – Virginie Loveling, Flemish poet and novelist (born 1836)
