= 1919 in Belgium =

- Decades: 1890s; 1900s; 1910s; 1920s; 1930s
- See also: Other events of 1919; List of years in Belgium

Events in the year 1919 in Belgium.

== Incumbents ==
Monarch – Albert I
Prime Minister – Léon Delacroix

== Events ==
- 16 March — Société Nationale de Crédit à l'Industrie founded
- July – Raymond Poincaré, President of the Third French Republic, makes a state visit to Belgium
- 16 November – 1919 Belgian general election

== Publications ==
- American Red Cross Work for Belgium: Summary of activities of Commission for Belgium, September, 1917 – December, 1918 (Brussels).
- Albert Joseph Carnoy, The Past and the Future of Belgium (New York, Knickerbocker Press).
- Léon De Paeuw, La Réforme de l'Enseignement populaire en Belgique (Paris, Armand Colin).
- Cardinal Mercier, A Shepherd among Wolves: War-Time Letters of Cardinal Mercier, edited by Arthur Boutwood (London, The Faith Press).
- J.H. Twells, Jr., In the Prison City. Brussels, 1914–1918: A Personal Narrative (London, A. Melrose).

== Business ==
- Standaard Uitgeverij established

== Births ==
- 23 November – Francine Holley, painter (died 2020)
