= Louise De Hem =

Belgian painter

Louise de Hem
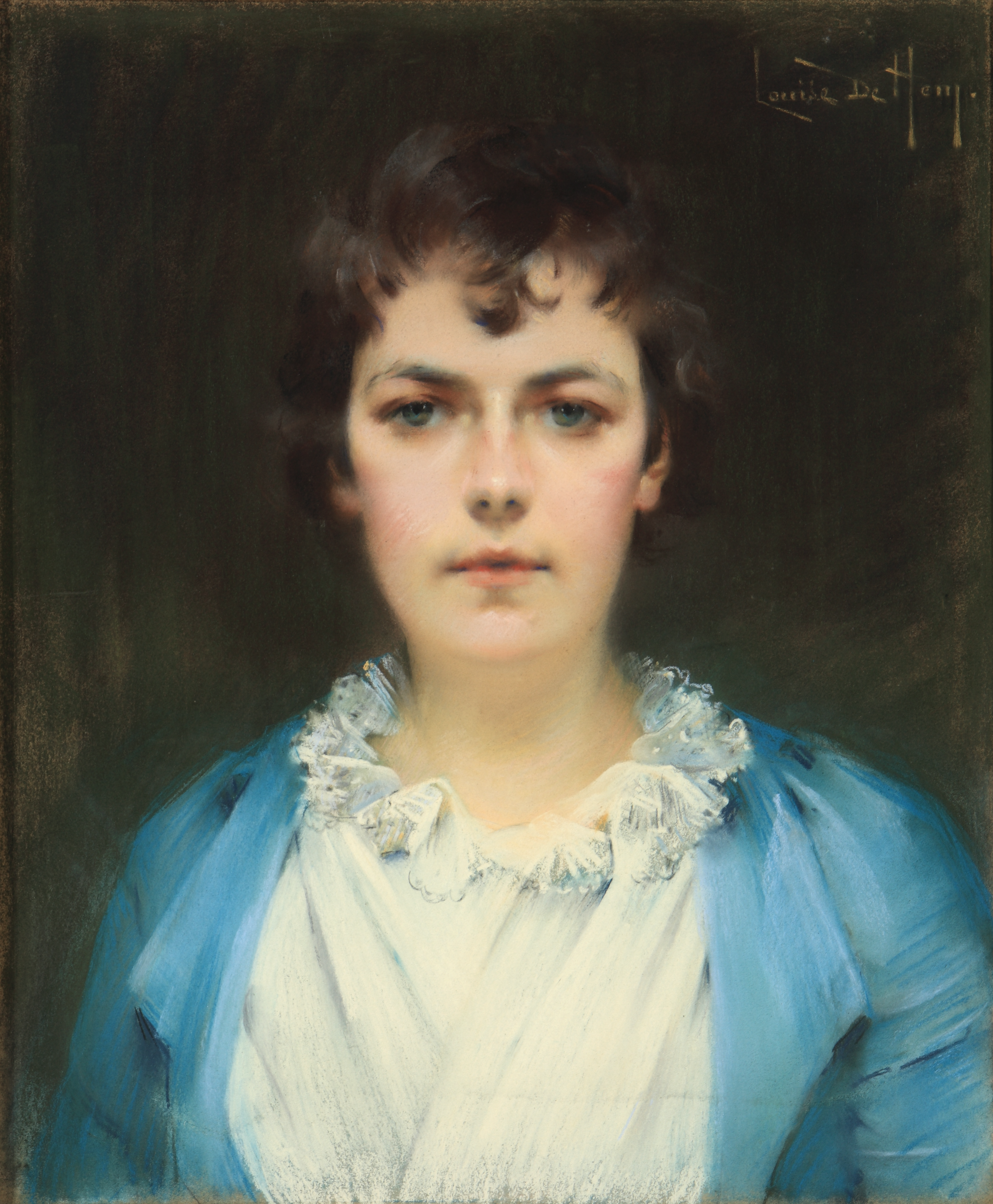
- Louise De Hem: Self Portrait (1890)
- Born: 10 Dec 1866; Ieper
- Died: 22 November 1922 (aged 55); Vorst
- Occupation: Belgian artist

Louise de Hem (1866–1922) was a Belgian painter. She grew up in Ypres, Belgium. Her talent was discovered by Théodore Ceriez (1831–1904), a painter who had married her sister Hélène. Since women were not yet admitted to the academies he educated her and already in 1885 her painting De Oesters (The Oysters) was exhibited at a salon in Spa. Jules Breton saw her work and encouraged her to go to Paris for further education.

== Life and career ==
From 1887 to 1891 de Hem mostly lived in Paris, where Alfred Stevens was one of her teachers. At the private Académie Julian she painted living and sometimes nude models (which was at that time in Belgium still forbidden for women). In 1891, she returned to Ypres where she shared a studio with Ceriez at the G. de Stuersstraat 33. She soon received commissions for portraits and also created still lives. In Paris, she frequently exhibited at the Salon de la Societé des Artistes Français.

de Hem exhibited her work at the Palace of Fine Arts and The Woman's Building at the 1893 World's Columbian Exposition in Chicago, Illinois. In 1900, she was the only Belgian painter to exhibit at the Women's Exhibition in London and in 1902 she became a member of the Women's International Art Club. In 1904, she won a gold medal in Paris for her painting "De Japanse Pop" (The Japanese Doll).

After Ceriez died on 2 Sep 1904 de Hem moved to Vorst (near Brussels) with her mother and her sister, where they lived in an Art Nouveau house designed by Ernest Blerot. On 2 May 1908, she married Frédéric Lebbe, an engineer who was seven years her senior and in 1911 she received a knighthood. She exhibited for the last time in 1915 and did not resume painting after the First World War. In 1922, Louise de Hem died at the age of 56. Hélène died five years later and left 49 of her sister's works to the city of Ypres.

== Gallery ==
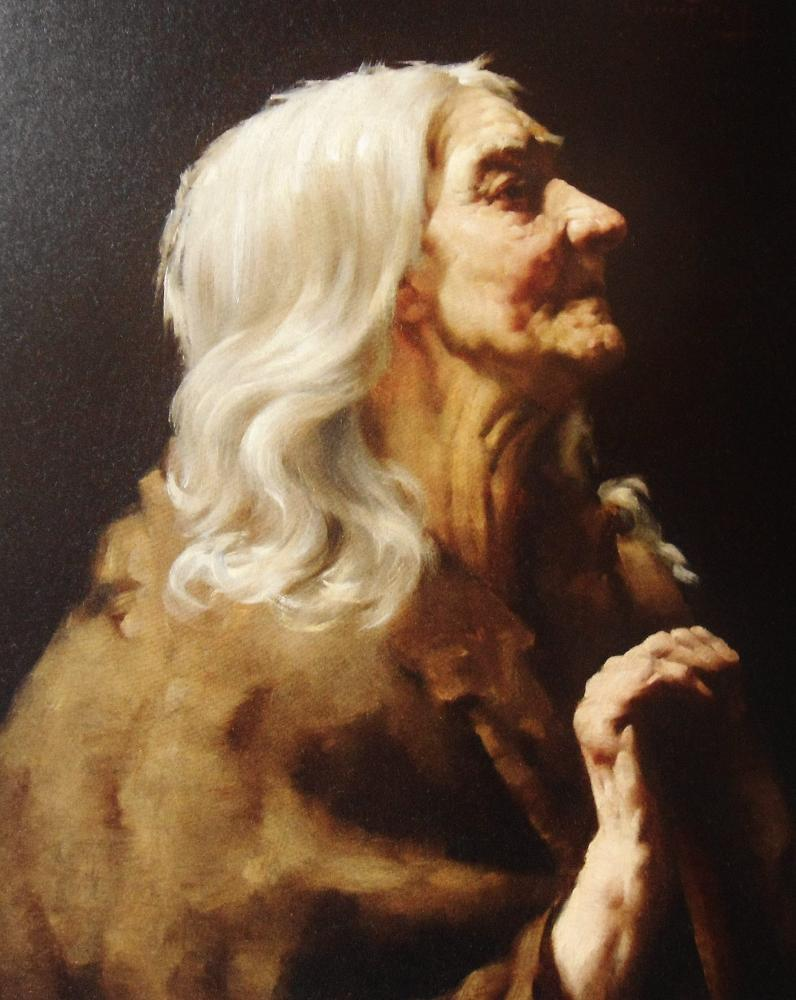
An Old Woman (1888)

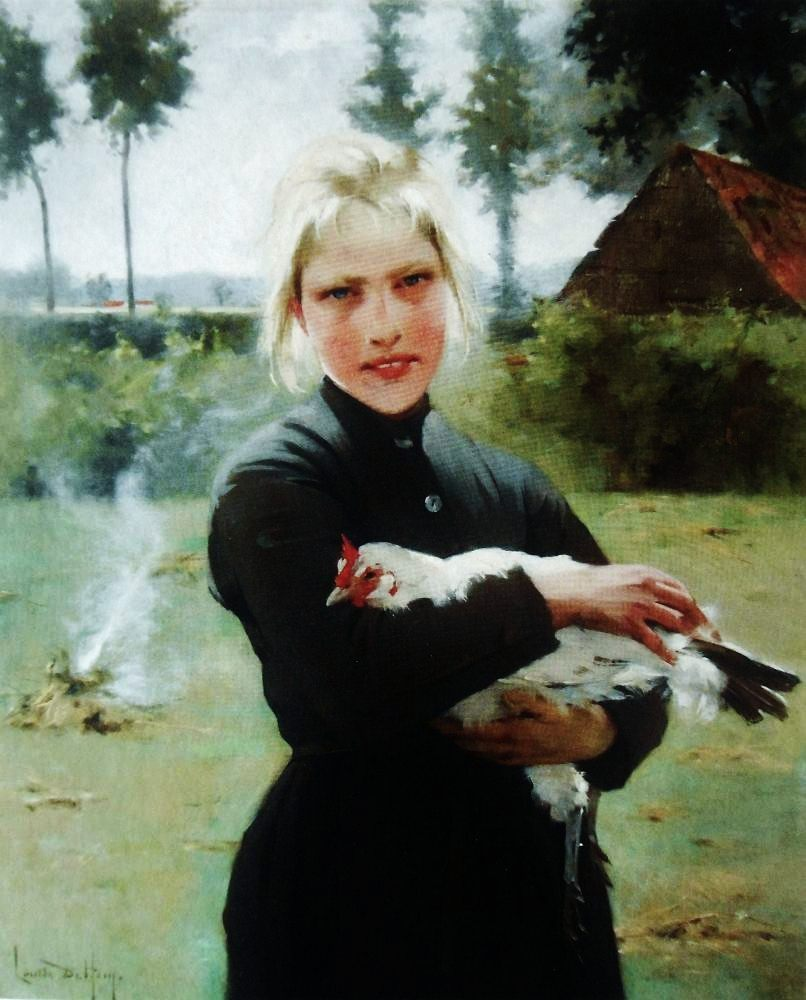
The Stray Chicken (1891)

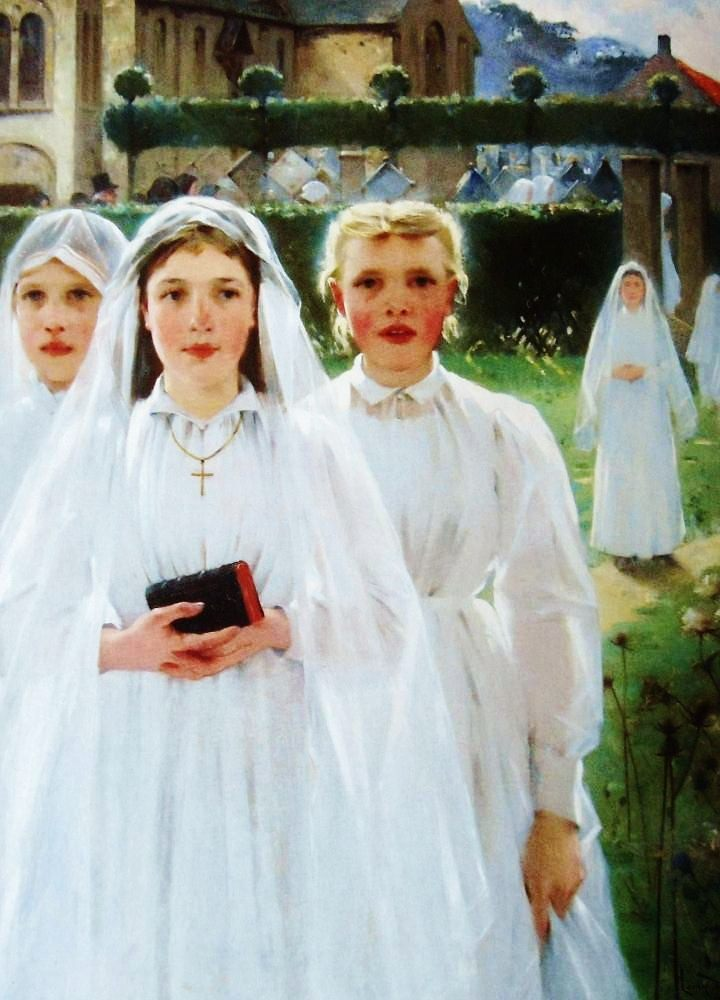
After the Procession (1892)

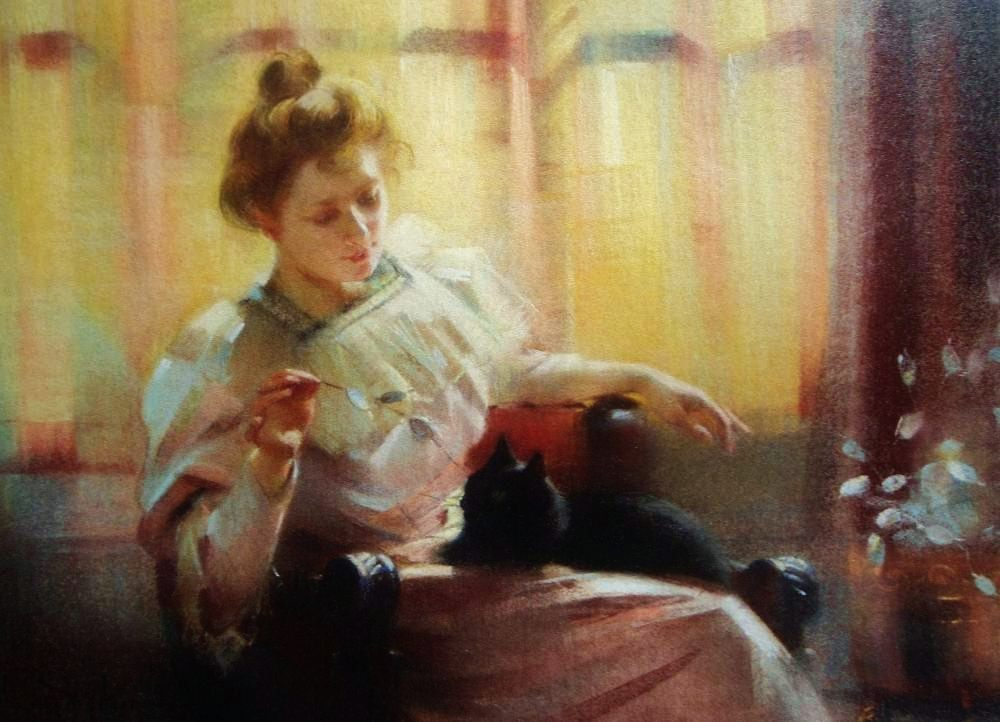
The Black Cat (1902)

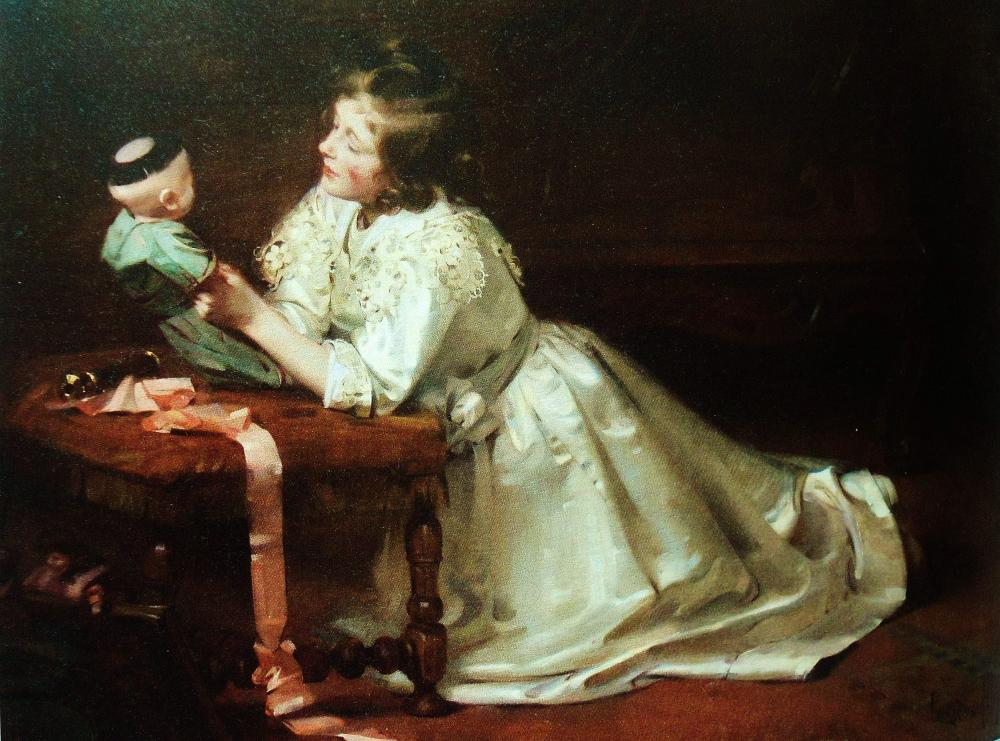
The Japanese Doll (1904)

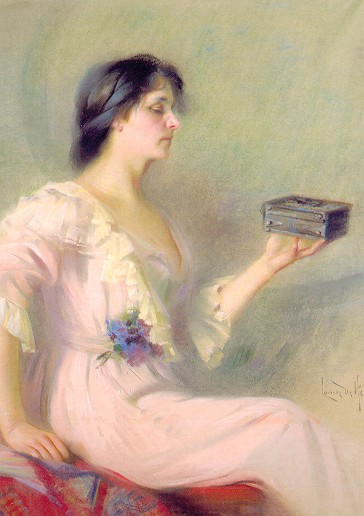
Pandora's Box (1910)
