= 1921 in Belgium =

- Decades: 1900s; 1910s; 1920s; 1930s; 1940s
- See also: Other events of 1921; List of years in Belgium

Events in the year 1921 in Belgium.

== Incumbents ==
Monarch – Albert I
Prime Minister – Henry Carton de Wiart (to 16 December); Georges Theunis (from 16 December)

== Events ==
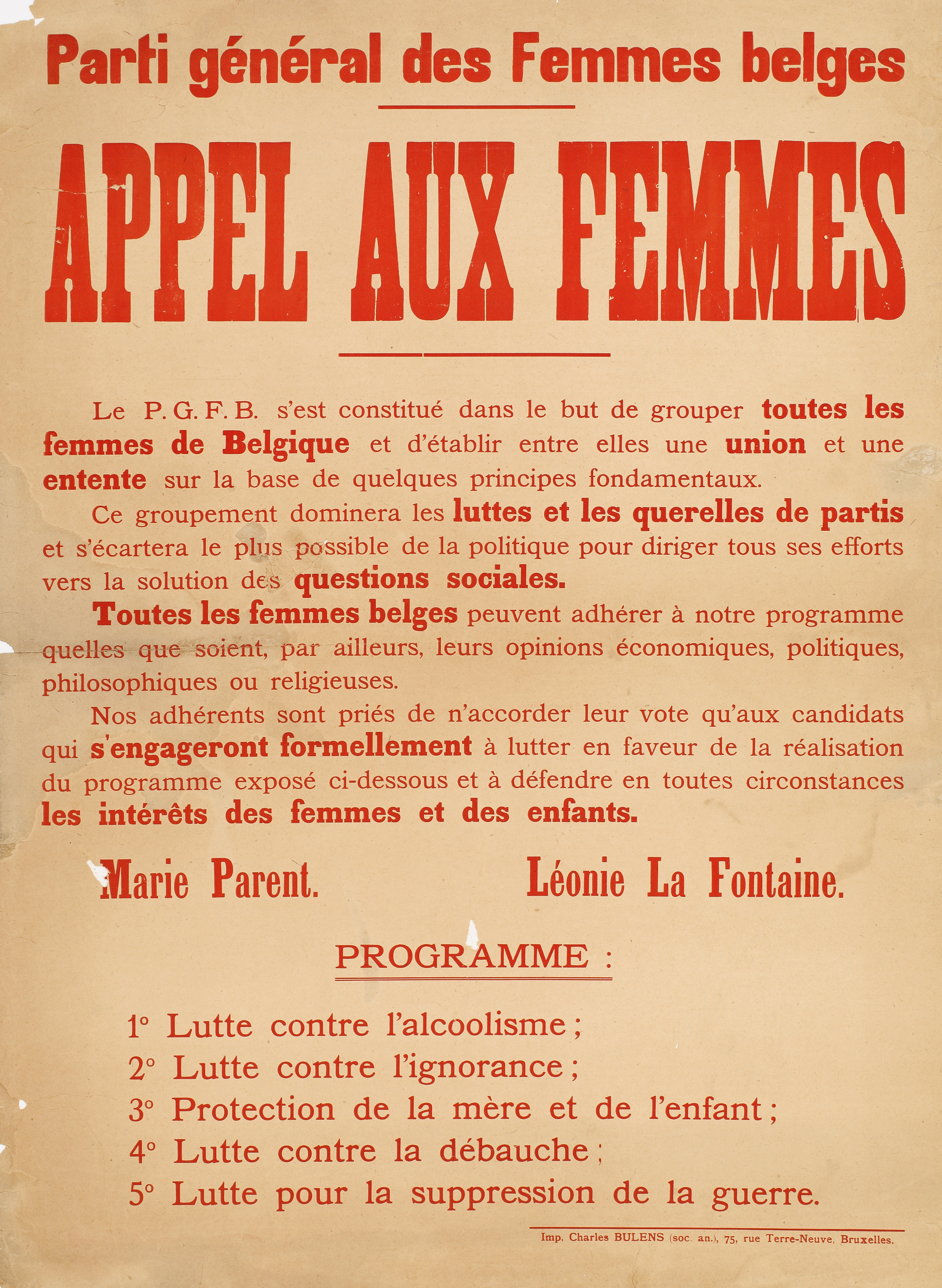
Electoral poster for the Belgian Women's Party

- 24 April – Municipal elections
- April – Third Solvay Conference held in Brussels
- June – Crown Prince Hirohito's official visit to Belgium.
- 18 September – 10th Gordon Bennett Cup held in Brussels
- 20 November – Legislative elections (first with limited female suffrage)
- 27 November – Provincial elections

== Publications ==
- Olympic Games Handbook: Containing official records of the seventh Olympiad (New York, American Sports Publishing co.)
- Émile Cammaerts, Belgium from the Roman Invasion to the Present Day (London, T. Fisher Unwin)

== Art and architecture ==
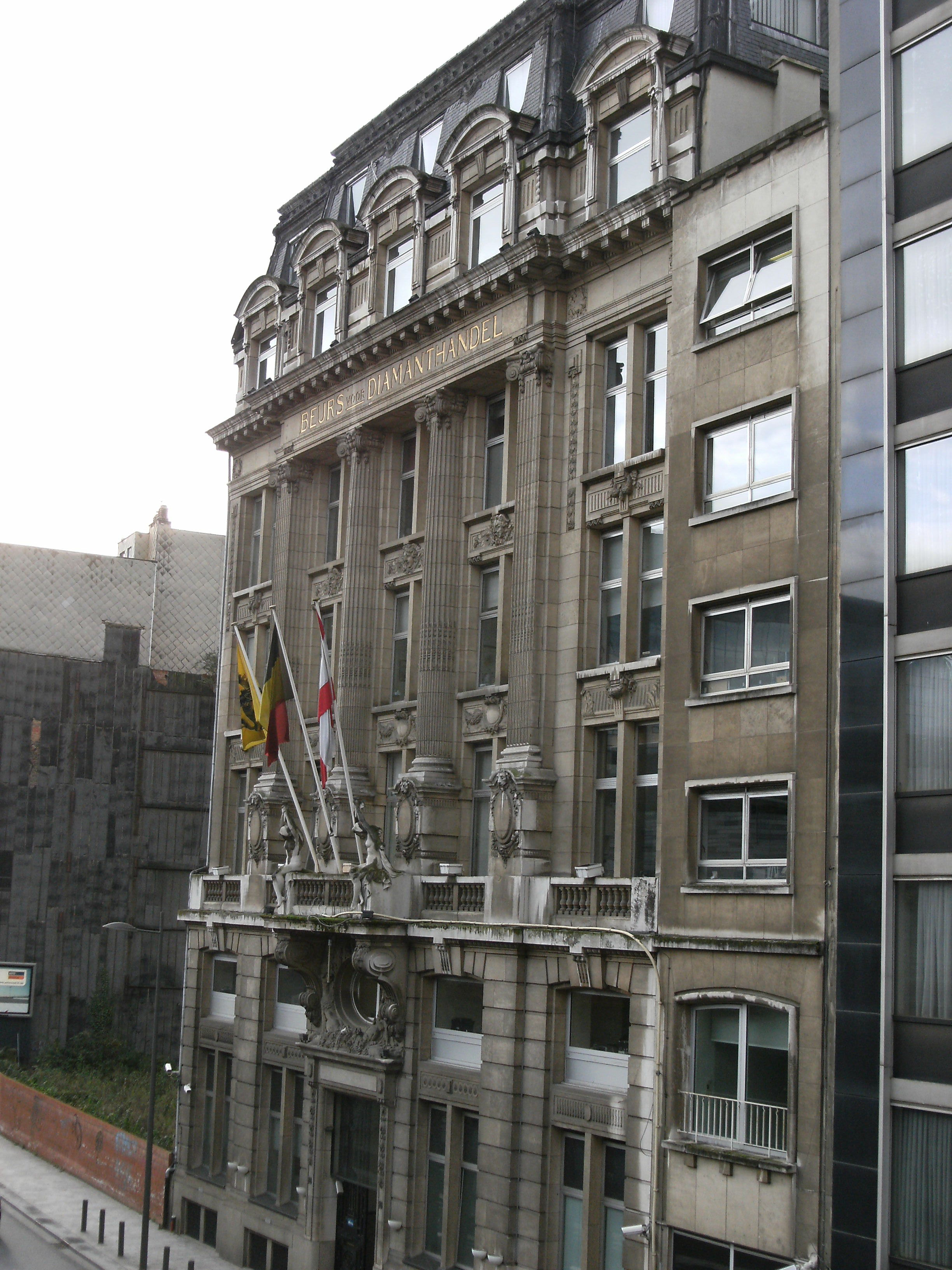
Antwerp Diamond Exchange (completed 1921)

Buildings

- Antwerp Diamond Exchange completed.

== Births ==
- 21 March – Arthur Grumiaux, violinist (died 1986)
- 13 April – Joseph Moureau, fighter pilot (died 2020)
- 7 September – René Derolez, philologist (died 2005)

== Deaths ==
- 12 November – Fernand Khnopff (born 1858), painter
