= André Baillon =

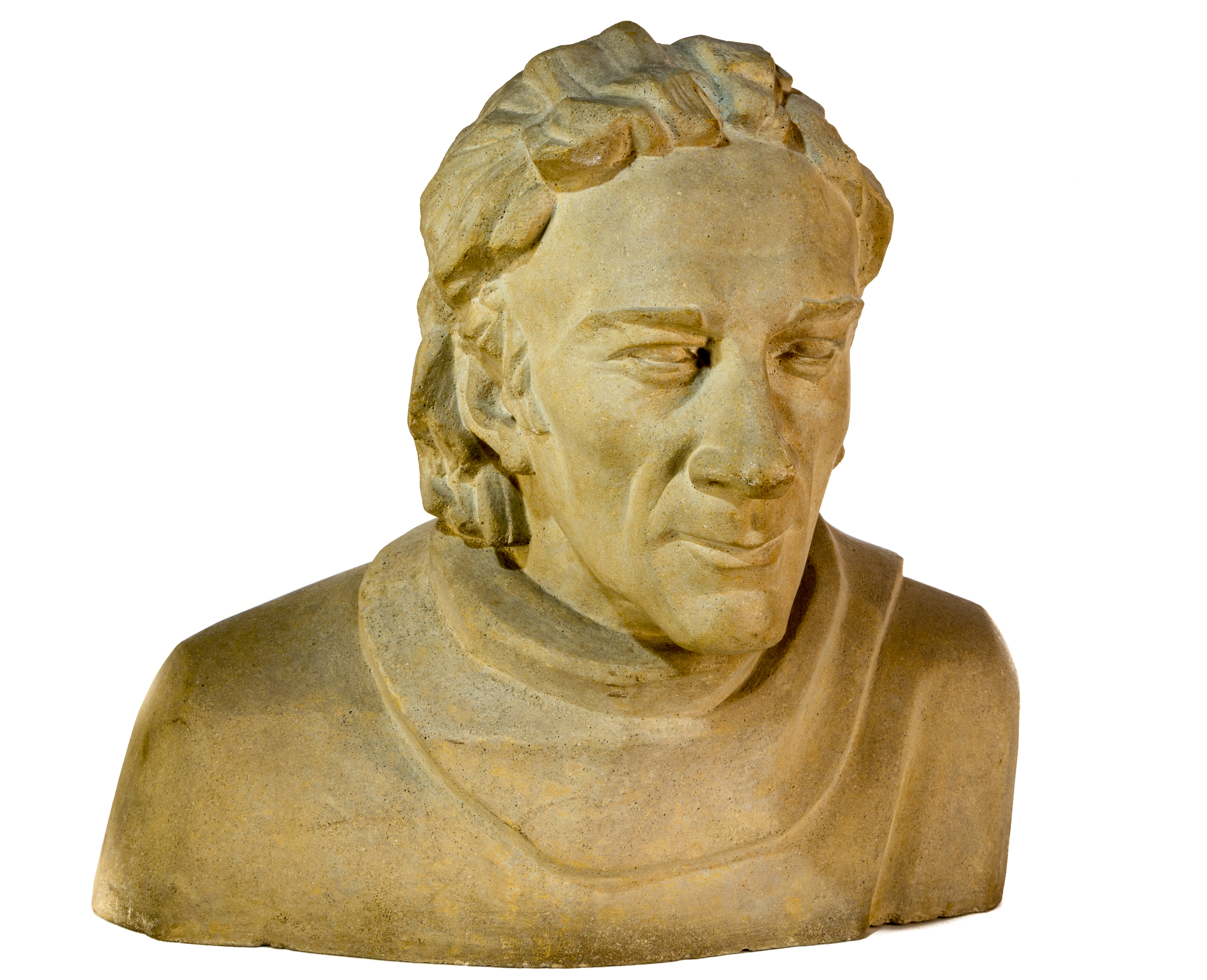
Baillon (bust by Adolphe Wansart)

André-Émile-Louis Baillon (27 April 1875 – 10 April 1932) was a Belgian novelist and short-story writer, who wrote in French. Much of his work is autobiographical in origin.

== Biography ==
André Baillon was born on 27 April 1875 in Antwerp to a bourgeois family. His father, Joseph-Chrétien Baillon, a successful businessman in the construction industry, died shortly after his birth, and his mother, Julie-Isabelle (née Van Bellinghen) also died when he was a young child, leaving André to be brought up in Termonde by an aunt on his father's side. He had an elder brother Julien who became a lawyer. André Baillon received a Roman Catholic education, attending the Collège Saint Joseph in Turnhout. He attended the École Polytechnique de Louvain from 1893. He moved to Brussels, where he started to write and publish in Belgian periodicals, but began to gamble and became troubled by suicidal ideation. His first marriage in 1902 to Marie Vandenberghe, a servant who had worked as a prostitute, temporarily alleviated his problems. The couple left Brussels for the village of Westmalle, Campine, where they adopted a rural lifestyle.

Baillon later took up an editorial position on La Dernière Heure, a Brussels newspaper, and by the First World War he was married to Germaine Lievens, a pianist. The war inspired him to write, and he was supported in his literary efforts by Germaine. Many of his novels originated in this decade. His earliest major published work, Moi quelque part (Me, Somewhere) first appeared in 1920. A version of it came out in Paris as En Sabots (In Wooden Shoes) in 1922, and the retitled novel proved a critical success, attracting praise from Jean-Richard Bloch and Charles Vildrac. This led him to move to Paris and attempt to make his living from his literary works. His main publisher was Rieder & Cie, a Paris-based publishing house which brought out works by Belgian authors including Constant Burniaux and Jean Tousseul in the interwar years.

The move proved disastrous for Baillon's mental and physical health. Despite repeated hospitalisations he continued to write, and his works turn to addressing his experiences of mental illness. During this period he had an affair with the writer Marie de Vivier, who recounted the story after his death in her novel, L'homme pointu (The Sharp Man; 1942).

He died by suicide on 10 April 1932 at Saint-Germain-en-Laye, Paris.

== Works ==
Moi quelque part (1920)

Baillon wrote in French, although he was Flemish by birth and upbringing, and praised the dialect of Flemish spoken in Westmalle. Much of his work is autobiographical in nature; Lucien Christophe and Herman Teirlinck write in 1953 that Baillon's calling is "to loiter and to grope his way into his past, inviting us to loiter with him and peer under the furniture". They further comment that writing in French about Flanders might "add... a piquant touch of confusion" to his observations.

Moi quelque part (Me, Somewhere; 1920) is based on his experiences in Westmalle. Histoire d'une Marie (Story of a Girl Named Mary; 1921), based on the life of first wife, addresses the topic of prostitution, and this is also the theme of Zonzon Pépette, fille de Londres (Zonzon Pépette, Girl of London; 1923). Par fil spécial (By Special Cable; 1924) is a "sardonic" response to his stint as a newspaper editor. Chalet I (1926) recounts his stay in the Salpêtrière Hospital. Le Neveu de Mademoiselle Autorité (The Nephew of Miss Authority; 1930/1932) is based on childhood experiences with his aunt.

His later works, often written while he was ill, are appreciated for their pioneering frank depictions of mental illness, particularly the collection Délires (Deliriums; 1927), described as "remarkable" and "[a]s rhythmic as a logical hallucination".

=== Historical reception ===
Baillon's work was popular in France during his lifetime and before the Second World War. He was variously classed as being proletarian, populist and regional. A. P. Coleman, in a death notice, characterises Histoire d'une Marie as a "social problem novel" and compares it with the works of "the better known" Charles-Louis Philippe. Maurice Gauchez, writing in 1931, compares Baillon with both Philippe and Fyodor Dostoevsky, drawing attention to the fact that Baillon's protagonists are often placed in difficult situations. Baillon's works were translated; Histoire d'une Marie, for example, had seven translations in the late 1920s, and En Sabots and Zonzon Pépette, fille de Londres were both translated into German.

His popularity decreased after the Second World War, but the author continued to attract critical attention during the 1950s. Simone de Beauvoir praises Le Perce-oreille du Luxembourg in a 1960 memoir. At the end of the 1960s, some of his works were adapted for the theatre in Belgium. From the mid-1970s, many of his works were brought back into print as part of the Passé Présent/Les Éperonniers and Espace Nord imprints.

In the late 20th and early 21st century, critical attention focused on Baillon's life. His works were translated into Dutch, Romanian, Chinese and Bulgarian. A biography by Frans Denissen was published in Dutch (De Gigolo van Irma Ideaal) in 1998, winning the AKO Literatuurprijs and being translated into French. New editions of several of Baillon's novels have been published in France by Cent Pages, Finitude and Cambourakis. Les Nouveaux Cahiers André Baillon, a periodical covering research into his works, was published in 2003–11, and its editors also held a conference in Belgium on the topic in 2007.

== Bibliography ==
Sources:

- Le Pénitent exaspéré (1915)
- Moi, quelque part (Me, Somewhere) (Edition la soupente; 1920)
- Histoire d'une Marie (Story of a Girl Named Mary) (Rieder; 1921)
- En sabots (Rieder; 1922)
- Zonzon Pépette, fille de Londres (J. Ferenczi; 1923)
- Par fil spécial: Carnet d'un secrétaire de rédaction (By Special Cable) (Rieder; 1924)
- Un homme si simple (Such a Simple Man) (Rieder; 1925)
- Le pot de fleur: Boix gravés de Jan Fr. Cantré (Éditions "Lumière"; 1925)
- Chalet I (Rieder; 1926)
- Délires (Deliriums) (M. Sénac; 1927); prose poem(s) or short stories
- Le Perce-oreille du Luxembourg (The Earwig of Luxenbourg) (Rieder; 1928)
- La vie est quotidienne (Rieder; 1929)
- Le Neveu de Mademoiselle Autorité (The Nephew of Miss Authority) (Rieder; 1930/1932)
- Des vivants et des morts (The Living and the Dead) (1930)
- Roseau (Rieder; 1932)
- La dupe (La renaissance du livre; 1944)
- Les meilleures pages (La renaissance du livre, 1961) (edited by Adrien Jans)
