= Louis Devos =

Belgian conductor and tenor

- Born: 15 June 1926
- Died: 22 January 2015 (aged 88)
- Genres: Opera
- Instrument: Vocals

Louis Devos (15 June 1926 — 22 January 2015) was a Belgian conductor and opera singer. He has taught singing at the Royal Conservatoire Antwerp.
