= Ernest Blerot =

Belgian architect

Ernest Blerot was a Belgian architect who was born in Ixelles (Brussels) on February 21, 1870, and died in Ixelles on January 10, 1957. He was one of the most prolific Art Nouveau style Brussels architects of his time, and also worked as a property developer. Most of his work was produced from 1897 to 1909 and in particular between 1898 and 1904, the period during which he achieved around fifty houses.

Blerot married Yvonne de Gheus d'Elzenwalle on July 25, 1912, in Ixelles. Yvonne de Gheus d'Elzenwalle was born on September 26, 1893, in Ixelles and died in her home town on December 5, 1951.

== Biographical facts ==
=== Background ===
Ernest Blerot was born on February 21, 1870, in Ixelles, in a bourgeois and Catholic family. He was the middle child of a family of three. His father Joseph Ernest Blerot who was born on August 25, 1838, in Bastogne and died on October 9, 1917, in Ixelles, was a pharmacist, chaussée de Wavre, 165, and had married Jeanne Mélanie Knaepen on April 25, 1864, in Ixelles, who was born in Ixelles on April 15, 1844, and died in the same place on April 14, 1900.

=== Ernest Blerot’s early years ===
He was fourteen years old when he implemented a system similar to the concept of the Yale locks. Enjoying hiking, he regularly went to the Alps of the Valais in Switzerland. He obtained his master's degree in architecture at the former architecture school on the Sint-Lukas campus in Schaarbeek.

== The architect ==
=== Specificities ===
Ernest Blerot’s intent was not to reinvent architecture, in contrast to Victor Horta. The architecture design of his projects differed slightly from the classic pattern of the Brussels one-family houses of the time that was partly determined by the establishment of regulations which set the widths and depths of the lots in the new residential neighborhoods, six-meters facade for about fifteen meters deep. The middle-class houses consisted often of a semi-underground level for services (kitchen cellar) topped with the elevated « ground floor » that was composed of three adjoining rooms, and with two floors of bedrooms.

The bulk of the architect’s buildings are concentrated in a few streets and blocks in groups of terraced houses, the most important being a series of seventeen houses that occupied an entire side of a street. This standardisation kept the homogeneity of the whole, and above all helped strongly reduce construction time and cost. This work process made houses designed by Blerot affordable to the petty bourgeoisie with whom he was very popular. For every house, Blerot designed a different facade, every indoor and outdoor decorative element was customized. He designed his own stained-glass windows, sgraffito works, decorative ironwork, mosaics, pieces of wooden furniture, and door handles with meticulous attention to detail.

=== The business man ===
Ernest Blerot kept some of the houses he built as his private property. He later transformed part of it into apartment buildings he rented out, and made a fortune in a short time. During the following years, when the public's attraction for the Art Nouveau began to decrease, he found it difficult to adjust to the new needs and ceased his activities.

=== After the First World War ===
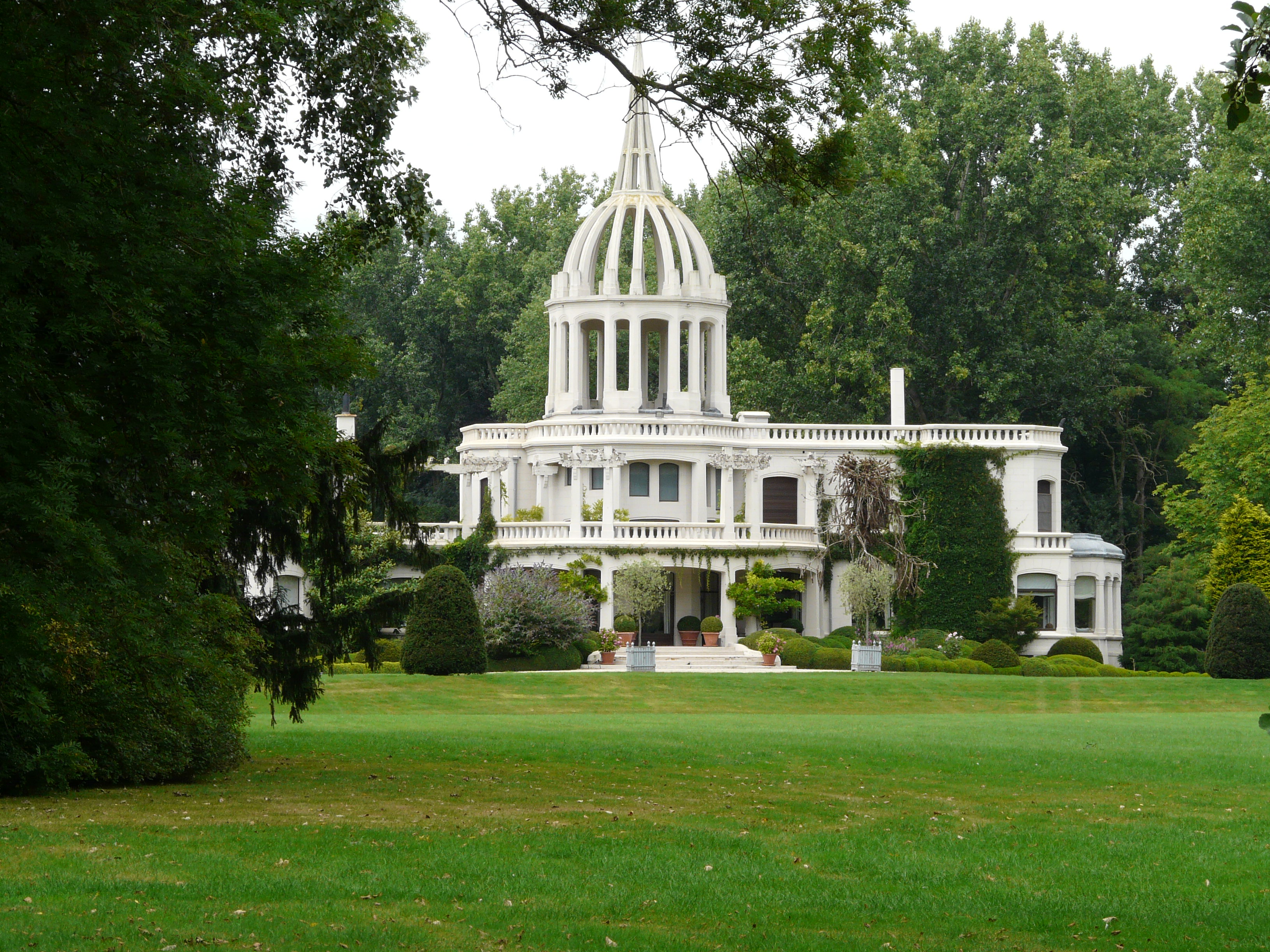
Elzenwalle Castle in Voormezele

In 1919, Ernest Blerot dedicated himself to the reconstruction of Elzenwalle Castle in the Ypres area, inherited from his wife’s family.

At the end of his life, enthusiastic about mechanical things, he designed prototypes of motor vehicles.

He died on January 19, 1957, in his mansion located near the Ixelles Ponds, and was buried at Voormezele, near Ypres.
