= Henri Dirickx =

Belgian footballer

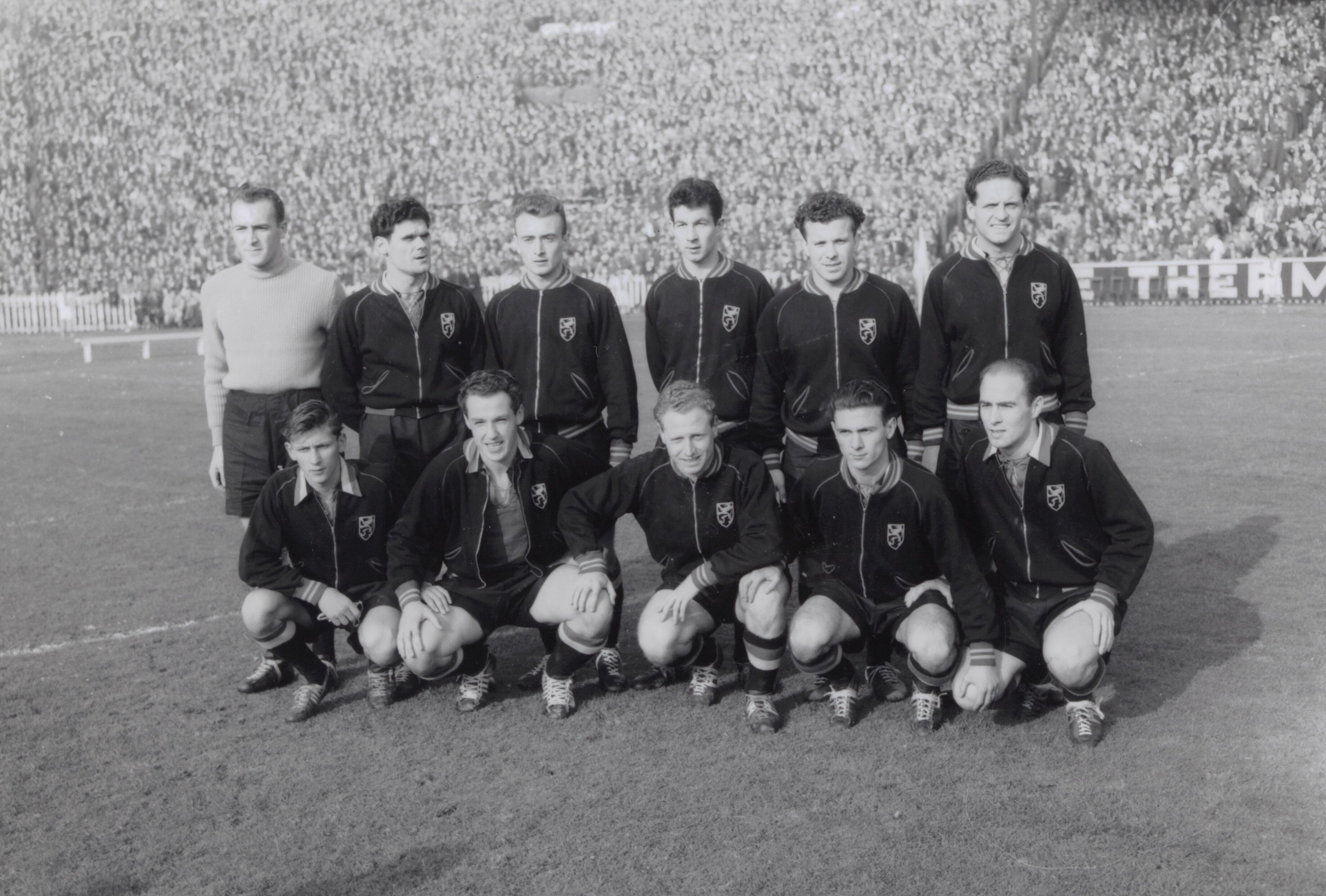
- Diricx with the Belgian team (1956)

Personal information
- Date of birth: 7 July 1927
- Place of birth: Duffel, Belgium
- Date of death: 26 June 2018 (aged 90)
- Place of death: Jette, Belgium
- Position: Defender

Senior career*
Years	Team	Apps	(Gls)
1951–1962	Union Saint-Gilloise		
1962–1967	Racing Jette		
1967–1969	Ixelles		

International career
1952–1960	Belgium	30	(1)
- * Club domestic league appearances and goals

Henri Dirickx (also spelt Ditricx; 7 July 1927 – 26 June 2018) was a Belgian international footballer, who played as a defender. Dirickx was the last surviving member of Belgium's 1954 World Cup squad.

== Career ==
Born in Duffel, Dirickx played club football for Union Saint-Gilloise, Racing Jette and Ixelles. He earned a total of 30 caps for Belgium between 1952 and 1960, and participated at the 1954 FIFA World Cup. Dirickx died on 26 June 2018, eleven days shy of his 91st birthday.
