= Jean Haust =

Belgian academic, linguist and philologist

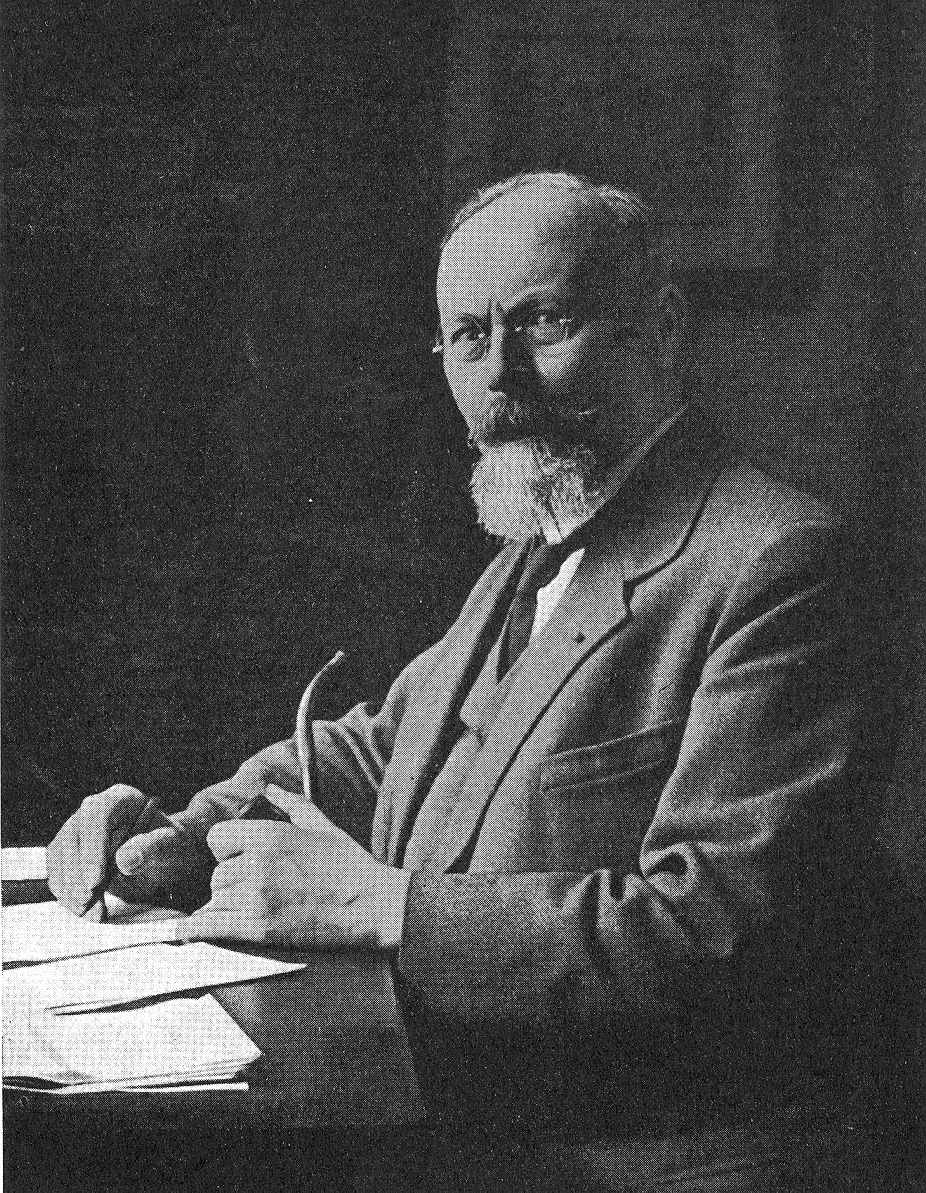
Jean Haust (1868–1946)

Jean Haust (Verviers, 10 February 1868– Liège, 23 November 1946) was a Belgian academic, linguist and philologist. He was a professor at the University of Liège en became known for his publication of several dictionaries containing the Walloon dialect of Liège.

== Honours ==
- 1932: Commander in the Order of Leopold.

== Works ==
- Étymologies wallonnes et françaises (Liège and Paris, H. Vaillant-Carmanne and Édouard Champion, 1923)
