= Yolande Uyttenhove =

Yolande Uyttenhove (25 July 1925 – 2 February 2000) was a Belgian composer and pianist.

A native of Leuze, Uyttenhove studied music at the Brussels Conservatory, and gained in addition a licentiate diploma from the Royal Academy of Music in London. She received numerous international awards for piano and composition, and placed in competitions in Barcelona, Viotti, and Paris (Concours international de composition Lutèce). Her music owed much to that of the Romantics, especially Gabriel Fauré, and borrowed from medieval traditions as well; it was enhanced through modern harmonic structures. Her own name for this style of composition was "intemporel".

Yolande Uyttenhove composed more than two hundred works. She graduated from the Vercelli (Italy) International Contest for Composition. Her sonata for violin and piano (op. 95) was awarded the golden medal from the Lutèce International Contest for Composition in Paris.

She was administratrix of the Union of Belgian Composers. She was honored with the Martin Lunssens’ prizes, the Sabam's honorific diploma and the bronze medal from the Arts, Sciences and Letters of France.

She founded the Braine-l’Alleud's school of music in 1972 and was the Headmistress of that school until 1990. Yolande Uyttenhove won the Fuga Trophy in 1987 for her action in favor of Belgian music. From 1990 to 2000, she lectured in Europe and in the United States emphasizing the importance of women composers through the ages. She wrote a book "Marie-Antoinette, Reine et musicienne".
