= Francine Holley =

Belgian painter (1919–2020)

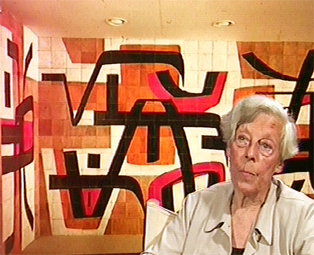
- Holley in 1995
- Born: 23 November 1919; Liège, Belgium
- Died: 22 May 2020 (aged 100); Paris, France
- Occupation: Painter

Francine Holley (23 November 1919 – 22 May 2020) was a Belgian painter.

== Biography ==
Holley was an apprentice of painter Mathilde Du Monceau from 1937 to 1944. She studied at the Académie royale des beaux-arts de Liège from 1944 to 1945, and moved to Paris the following year. She then trained with André Lhote from 1947 to 1948 before she painted in the workshops of Fernand Léger, Jean Dewasne, and Edgard Pillet. She gave her first exhibition in 1953 at the Galerie Arnaud in Paris, and subsequently presented at numerous galleries in France and Belgium. That same year, she created a wall decoration on the casino in Le Pouliguen. In 1955, her drawings became more complex and she diversified her material.

In 1962, Holley painted a mural at the entrance of the École Technique Aéronautique de Ville d'Avray following a request from Raymond Lopez. She then created a graphic design of the Dalle de Bobigny. In 1974, she made two polychrome sculptures at the École Le Londeau in Noisy-le-Sec. In 1978, Holley painted a mural in entrance hall of the Tour Helsinki.

In 1998, Holley's works became simpler and more synthetic. In 2007, a retrospective was held in her honor at the Roybet Fould Museum in Courbevoie.

Francine Holley died in Paris on 22 May 2020 at the age of 100.
