= Paula Sémer =

Belgian actress and politician (1925–2021)

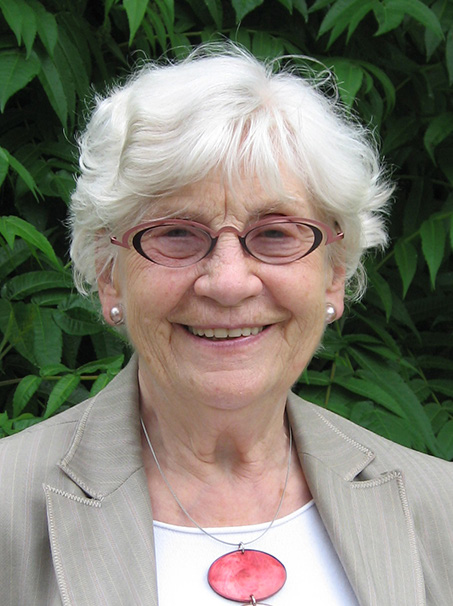

Member of the Senate of Belgium
- In office 1995–1999

Personal details
- Born: 9 April 1925 Antwerp, Belgium
- Died: 1 June 2021 (aged 96)
- Party: SA

Paula Sémer (9 April 1925 – 1 June 2021) was a Belgian actress and politician. A member of Socialistische Partij, she served in the Senate of Belgium from 1995 to 1999. She worked for the National Institute of Radio Broadcasting and VRT.

== Distinctions ==
- Commander of the Order of the Crown
- Officer of the Order of Leopold
