= Maison Guiette =

House by Le Corbusier in Antwerp, Belgium

UNESCO World Heritage Site
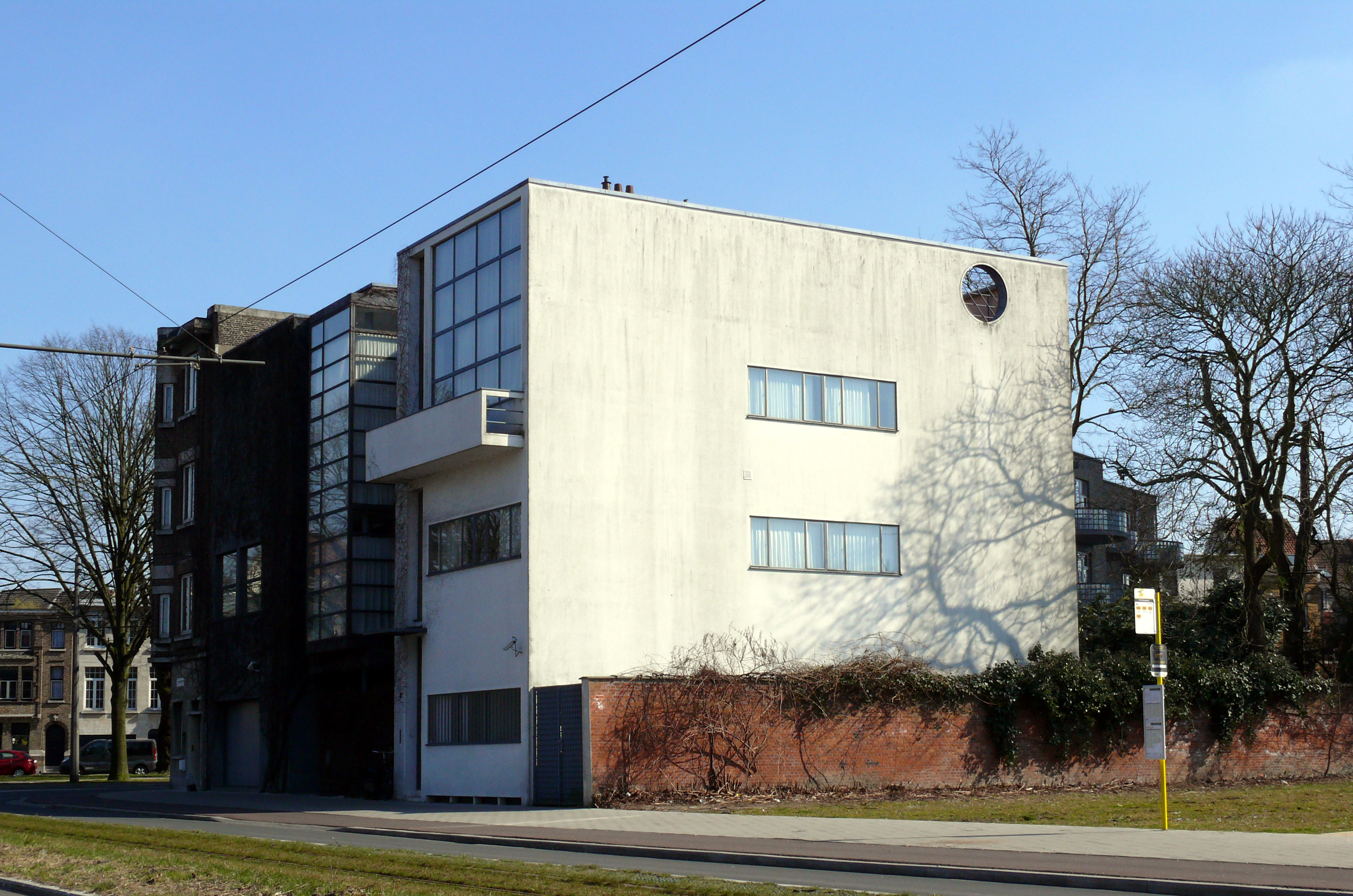
- Maison Guiette

- Location within Belgium
- Location: Antwerp, Antwerp (province), Belgium
- Part of: The Architectural Work of Le Corbusier, an Outstanding Contribution to the Modern Movement
- Criteria: Cultural: (i), (ii), (iv)
- Reference: 1321rev-004
- Inscription: 2016 (40th Session)
- Area: 0.0103 ha (1,110 sq ft)
- Buffer zone: 6.7531 ha (726,900 sq ft)
- Coordinates: 51°11′1.2″N 4°23′35.7″E

Maison Guiette also known as Les Peupliers, is a house in Antwerp, Belgium, designed by Le Corbusier in 1926 and built in 1927. It was the studio and living quarters of René Guiette, a painter and art critic. One of the Franco-Swiss architect's lesser-known works, it is an early example of the International Style.

Rene Guiette asked Le Corbusier to design a house modelled on the 1925 Pavilion de l'Esprit Nouveau. Guiette drew lifelong inspiration from the house using gouache and experimental photography

The house and the Guiette artwork was the subject of an exhibition at the 9H gallery London.

In July 2016, the house and several other works by Le Corbusier were inscribed as UNESCO World Heritage Sites.

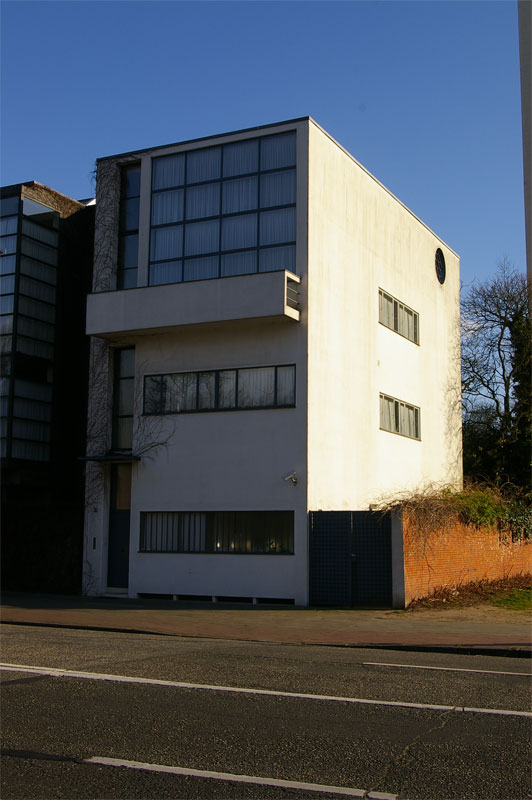
Maison Guiette
