= De Boma à Tshela =

1926 film

- Directed by: Ernest Genval
- Produced by: Mission cinématographique Genval
- Cinematography: Victor Morin
- Music by: silent
- Release date: 1926
- Running time: 29 minutes
- Country: Belgium

De Boma à Tshela is a Belgian 1926 documentary film.

== Synopsis ==
Ernest Genval explores the scenery along the railway line that links Boma to Tshela in the Mayumbe area. The train passes through the lush and dense vegetation of the thick forests and stops by farm estates along the route like Lukula, the Urselia domain (a colonial manufacturer of cocoa powder and palm oil), Lubuzi River and its new bridge, the Kangu mission and Tshela, where manufactured products are loaded onto boats for shipment to Europe. The train journey is also an eyewitness account of the workings of a well-oiled colonial system and the development of the black workforce at its service.
