= Geert Pijnenburg =

- Born: 23 August 1896; Turnhout, Belgium
- Died: 12 July 1980 (aged 83); Kapellen, Belgium

Geert Pijnenburg (23 August 1896 – 12 July 1980), pseudonym Geert Grub was a Belgian poet, writer and Flemish activist.

== Bibliography ==
- Sexologie en levensleer, 1936, Monography
- Het geslachtsleven van man en vrouw in liefde en huwelijk, 1936, Monography
- Gerecht en recht : kritiese bemerkingen op onze rechts- en strafpleging, en bijdrage om tot een betere wijze van recht-doen te komen, 1939, Monography
- Ethiek redt beschaving, 1946 Monography
- Etiek is kultuur, 1970, Monography

== Sources ==
- Geert Pijnenburg
