= Théophile Lybaert =

Belgian painter and sculptor

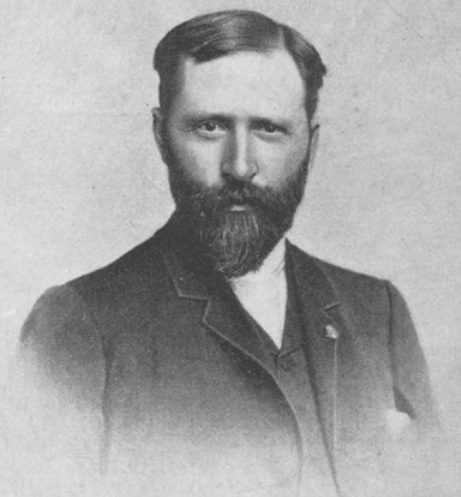
- Teophile Lybaert in 1893
- Born: Théophile Marie Francois Lybaert; 14 June 1848; Ghent, Belgium
- Died: 28 May 1927 (aged 78); Ghent, Belgium
- Education: Royal Academy of Fine Arts of Ghent
- Occupation: Painter

Théophile Marie Francois Lybaert or Theofiel Lybaert (14 June 1848 – 28 May 1927) was a Belgian painter and sculptor. He commenced his career as a painter of genre and Orientalist scenes. He later painted subjects from the national and international history, military life and the bible. He was mainly known for his religious paintings executed in an archaic, Gothic style that reprised the 16th century models of Northern-European masters such as Hans Memling and Albrecht Dürer. These works earned him the appelation of 'modern Gothic' or 'contemporary Memling'. In a final period starting from the 1910s he developed towards an eclectic style incorporating Symbolism.

== Life ==
Théophile Lybaert was born in Ghent as one of three sons of Jan Baptist Lybaert and Marie-Louise Coppejans. His father was an alumnus of the Royal Academy of Fine Arts (Ghent) and was a heraldic and decorative painter. His father also compiled a notebook with anecdotes about 19th-century painters from Ghent that was only published in 1998. From a young age Théophile received initial artistic training at the atelier of the brothers Paul and the Félix De Vigne, respectively a sculptor and painter who worked in the so-called 'troubadour' style.

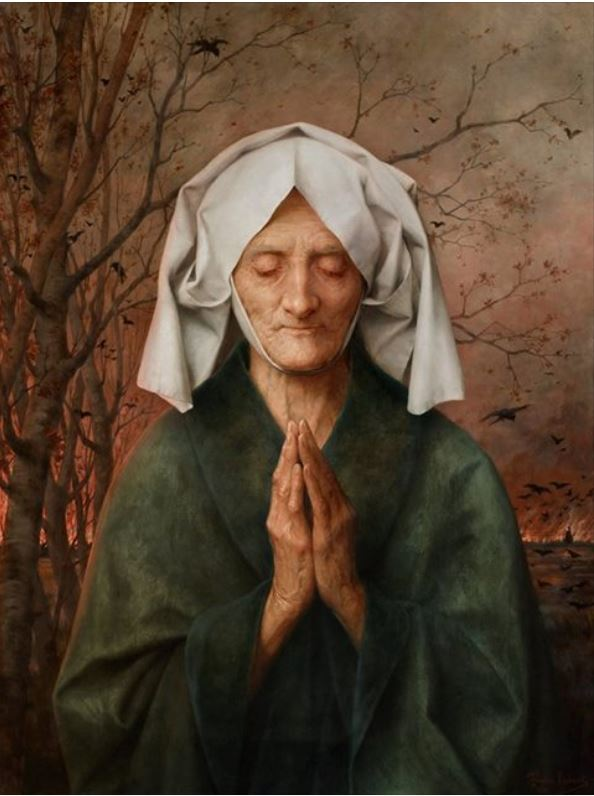
Old Flanders

Théophile enrolled in 1862 at the Royal Academy of Fine Arts of Ghent where the studied under the Belgian history painter Théodore-Joseph Canneel. He was a brilliant student and won a number of prizes including for real life drawing and anatomy. He exhibited for the first time in 1868 at the triennial salon of Ghent. His work representing Christ was not well received. In order to gain his livelihood, Lybaert painted trivial portraits and genre scenes for the American export market.

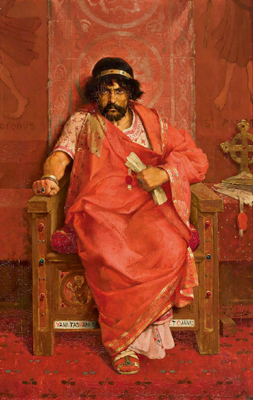
Pepin the Short or King Herod

In 1874 he went to Paris where he studied under the prominent Orientalist artist Jean-Léon Gérôme. He likely also spent time in North-Africa for his study. On his return to Ghent in 1878 he first became a noted painter of Oriental subjects. However, these works did not bring him the hoped for success and even exposed him to the criticism that he was solely an imitator of earlier Orientalists. He then abandoned genre painting in favour of portrait and history painting. He created large paintings of historical subjects such as The palace of Alhambra after the execution of the Abencerrages and The adoration of the emperor Caligula, which he sent to international exhibitions. These works earned him critical recognition. A religious work depicting the Virgin of Ghent (Groeningemuseum, Bruges) exhibited at the 1883 salon of Ghent was even more warmly received. From that time onwards Lybaert decided to focus on religious themes, which expressed his own Christian convictions and his admiration for the artists of the 16th century.

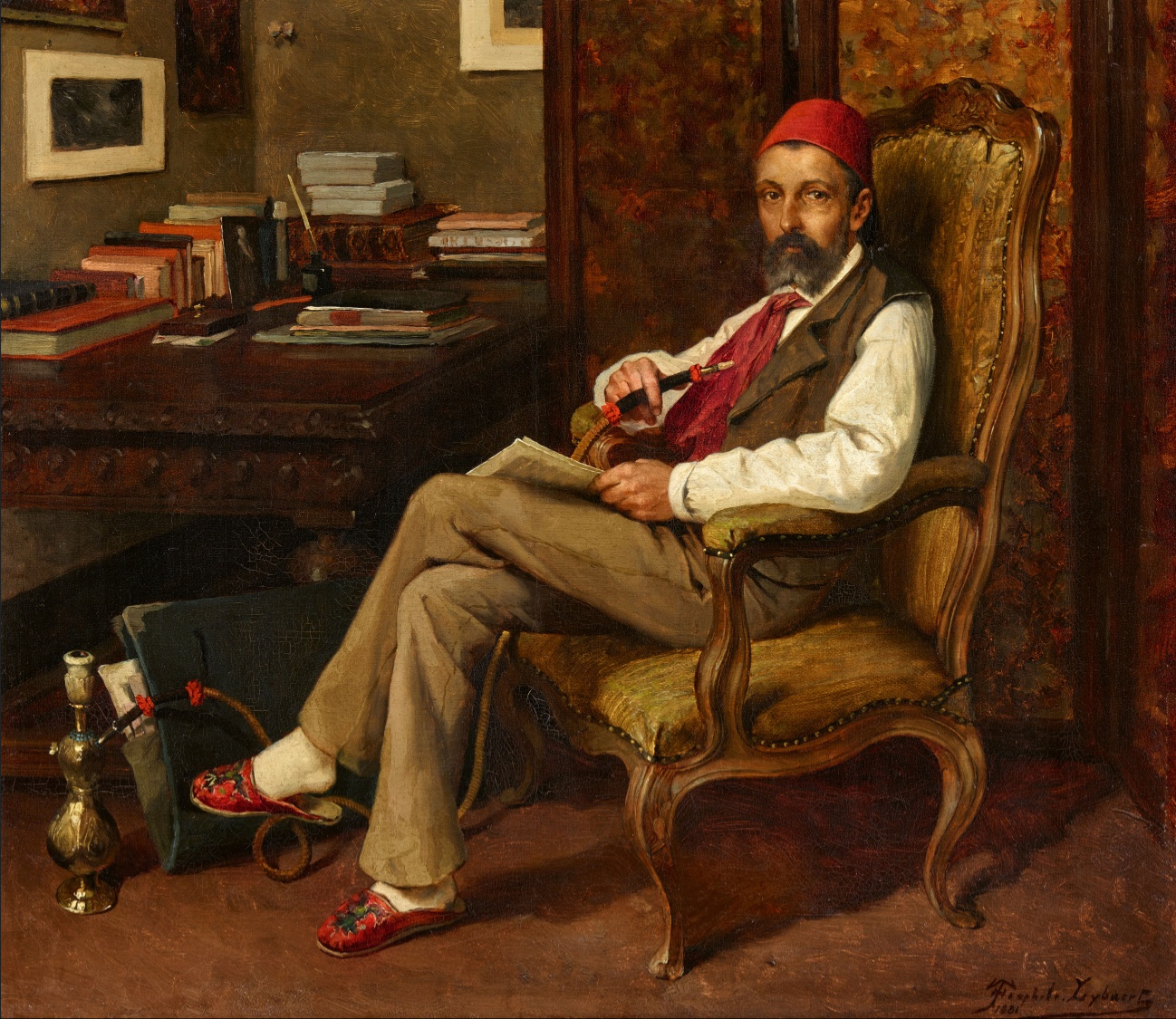
Oriental scholar with a pipe

A trip to Germany allowed him to study the works of Dürer. The artist gradually built an international reputation. He received prizes at the salons of Paris, Montpellier and Hamburg. At the salon of Caracas of 1884, he was awarded the 'Order of the Liberator' by the government of Venezuela. He was also made knight of the Order of Leopold by the Belgian government in 1885. His reputation spread widely thanks to the many reproductions of his work that were circulated during his lifetime. His work was particularly well received in conservative Catholic circles. The Vatican commissioned from the artist a Virgin and Child Jesus. The conservative, Catholic French writer Charles Buet wrote a booklet entitled Un moderne gothique about the artist lavishly singing his praises.

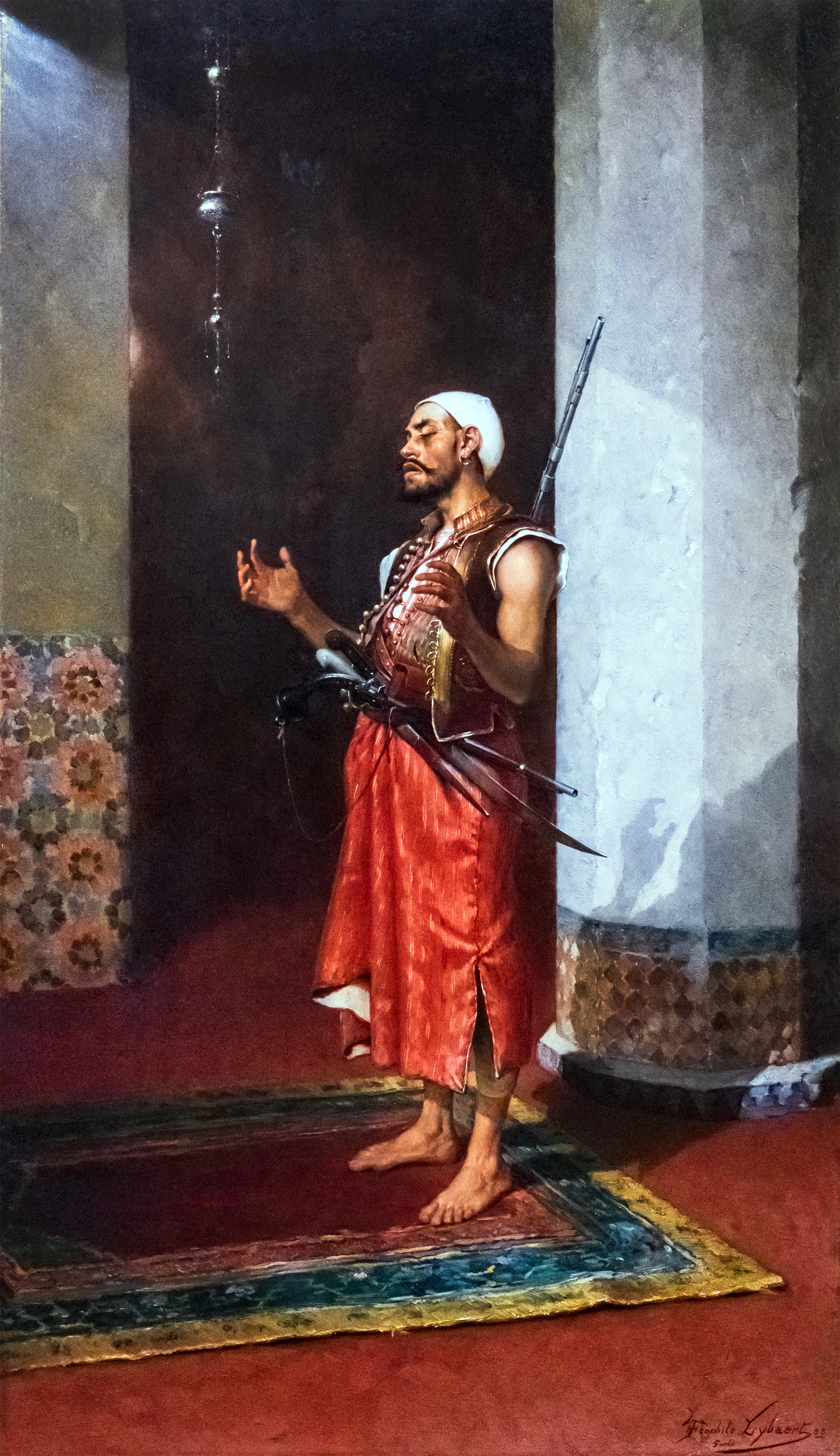
Turkish guard at prayer

Lybaert married Justine-Marie Temmerman on 14 May 1887. The couple remained childless. Lybaert obtained commissions for large mural projects in various churches in Belgium. He painted the Stations of the Cross in the St Anna Church and St Salvator Church in Ghent. In the St Anna Church he took over from his master Canneel who had commenced the decorative project but had died before he could finish is. Lybaert was active in the cultural life of his hometown and had a seat on the provincial commission for the protection of monuments and the commission of the Museum of Fine Arts of Ghent.

Lybaert continued to be active as an artist into his old age. He died in Ghent on 28 May 1927.

== Work ==
Lybaert started out as a painter of Christian scenes and subsequently developed towards genre scenes and Orientalist works. After a period during which he painted history paintings dealing with important episodes from the Belgian national history, he became primarily a painter of religious scenes.

The smoker, the drummer of the Jersey Blues

In his religious scenes Lybaert used an archaic, Gothic style that reprised the 16th century models of Northern-European masters such as Hans Memling and Albrecht Dürer. These works earned him the appelation of 'modern Gothic' or 'contemporary Memling'. He conducted a thorough historical research of the works of Memling in the Old St. John's Hospital in Bruges and conducted intense costume and architecture studies for his historical scenes and the various Stations of the Cross, which he painted. Lybaert was not the only Belgian painter who around this time harked back to the early masters and created 'reactionary' religious works. The latter part of the 19th century saw other Flemish artists experiment with this medieval revivalism in romantic painting. Particularly in the city of Bruges a number of artists, such as Edmond Van Hove, created religious subjects in a style similar to that of Lybaert. The subject of the Madonna with Child was particularly dear to Lybaert. He often depicted a Madonna against a gilt background or with a view of the city of Ghent in the background.

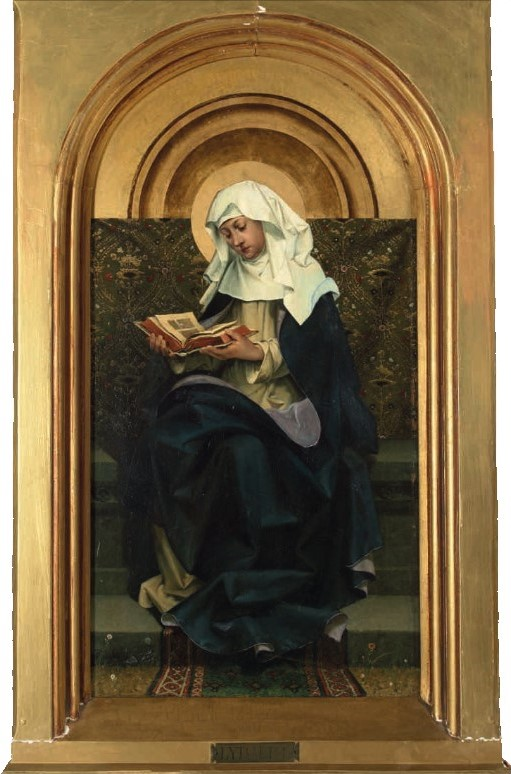
The Virgin reading

From the turn of the century onwards, he also depicted important national and international military events which involved the depiction of soldiers. An example of such a work is the Jersey Blues as scouts, American Revolutionary War 1783 (1904), which depicts a scene from the American Revolutionary War. Lybaert was known for spending a substantial amount of research on his historic subjects in order to ensure the accuracy of his paintings. For his paintings on subjects from the American Revolutionary War he contacted the American painter William B. T. Trego who was known for his historical military subjects, in particular scenes of the American Revolutionary War. Lybaert inquired about the details of the uniforms worn by soldiers during the American Revolutionary War. In his response, Trego prepared 18 drawings of American revolutionary soldiers with annotations. In addition to the outfits of the soldiers he also added details on the gear of the revolutionary soldiers such as their knapsacks, cartridge boxes, etc. Lybaert clearly used the detailed information provided to him by Trego in his American Revolutionary War subjects including in The smoker, the drummer of the Jersey Blues.

In a final period starting from the 1910s he developed towards an eclectic style incorporating Symbolism into his compositions still reminiscent of the techniques of the Flemish Primitives and the earlier inspiration he had drawn from old masters such as Hans Memling and Albrecht Dürer. A good example of a work from this latter period is his picture Old Flanders painted in 1915. It depicts an old woman who appears to be praying or meditating. She is a symbol of Flanders. In the background can be seen ravens and flames, a reference to the horrific events affecting the artist's homeland during the First World War, the period in which this composition was painted.

Lybaert had studied with artists who were also sculptors such as Paul de Vigne and Jean-Léon Gérôme. He produced some sculptures with religious subjects. An example is the statue of Germaine Cousin (Royal Museums of Fine Arts of Belgium).

== Other projects ==
- Media related to Théophile Lybaert at Wikimedia Commons
