= Karel Maes =

Belgian avant-garde painter and lithographer

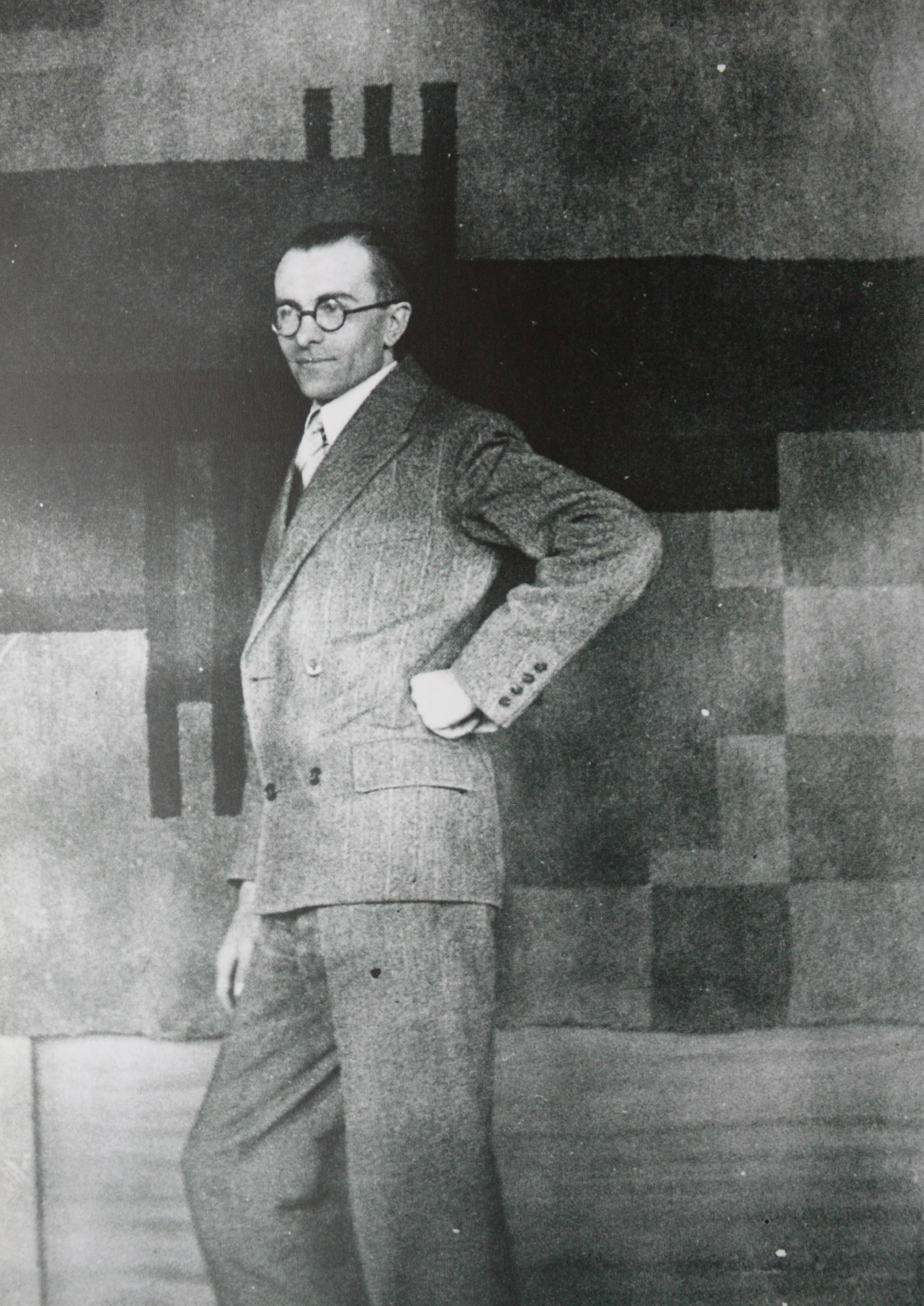
A photograph of Karel Maes posing in front of one of his works (1929)

Karel Maes (1900–1974) was an avant-garde painter, lithographer, furniture and set designer, and art critic. He was one of the foremost abstract artists in 20th-century Belgium.

== Life ==
Maes was born in Mol, Belgium, in 1900 and studied at the Royal Academy of Fine Arts, Brussels, before also training as a teacher at the École Normale Charles Buls. In 1922 he took part in the International Congress of Progressive Artists in Düsseldorf, and sat in the Constructivist International. He was part of the group that founded the avant-garde Brussels art magazine 7 Arts (1922–1928). He was also involved with the Dutch-language review Het Overzicht, sometimes designing its covers, as well as publishing in Der Sturm and De Stijl. He died in Brussels in 1974.

== Works ==
A number of his works are held by the Royal Museums of Fine Arts of Belgium in Brussels.
