= Colette Braeckman =

Belgian journalist

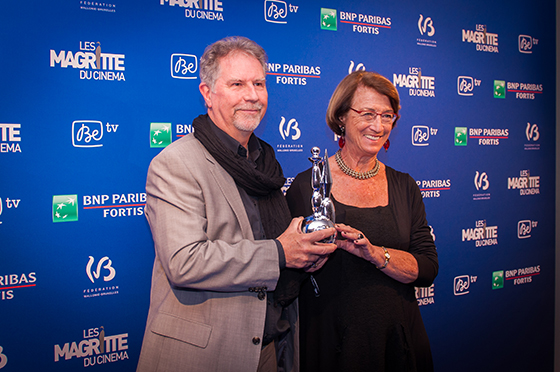
Colette Braeckman and Thierry Michel in 2016

Colette Braeckman is a Belgian journalist, born in Ixelles on April 20, 1946. She is a member of the editorial board of the Belgian French-language newspaper Le Soir, where she directs news coverage of Africa, particularly Central Africa. She has also been published in reviews and magazines, notably Le Monde diplomatique in both its French and English editions.

Colette Braeckman's articles on the Rwandan genocide were critical towards the French government. For their part, there have been critics of Braeckman's work, particularly public personalities within France who defend other arguments more favourable to the French government, but which have nonetheless been challenged; Canadian essayist Robin Philpot, journalists Pierre Péan and Charles Onana, by historian Bernard Lugan, by French Colonel Jacques Hogard and by Joseph Ngarambe, a survivor of the Rwandan genocide, an expert consultant for the International Criminal Tribunal for Rwanda, in an interview given to M. Péan and reported in his book.

Many of Braeckman's works have been reprinted by the organization Survie, which disseminates information about conflict in the former colonies of France in Africa.

== Bibliography ==
Colette Braeckman has authored several books on Central Africa, which are available in French at this time:

- Through Éditions Fayard :
  - Le dinosaure, le Zaïre de Mobutu,
  - Rwanda, histoire d'un génocide, 1994
  - Congo,
  - Rwanda-Burundi : les racines de la violence, 1996
  - Terreur africaine, 1999
  - Les Nouveaux Prédateurs, 2003
- Through Ėditions Aden :
  - Lumumba, un crime d'État
- Through Éditions Complexe (as contributor) :
  - Kabila prend le pouvoir, Les prémices d'une chute – La campagne victorieuse de l'AFDL – Le Congo aujourd'hui ISBN 2-87027-710-5
  - La Guerre, enfants admis, 300.000 enfants-soldats dans le monde : comment combattre ce fléau ? ISBN 2-87027-795-4
- Through André Versaille :
- Congo 1960: Échec d'une décolonisation by Colette Braeckman, Jules Gérard-Libois, Jean Kestergat, Jacques Vanderlinden, Benoît Verhaegen, Jean-Claude Willame, 2010, ISBN 978-2-87495-078-0

== See also ==
- Rwandan genocide
- French colonial empire
- Central Africa
- Decolonisation
