= Isabelle Durant =

Belgian politician (born 1954)

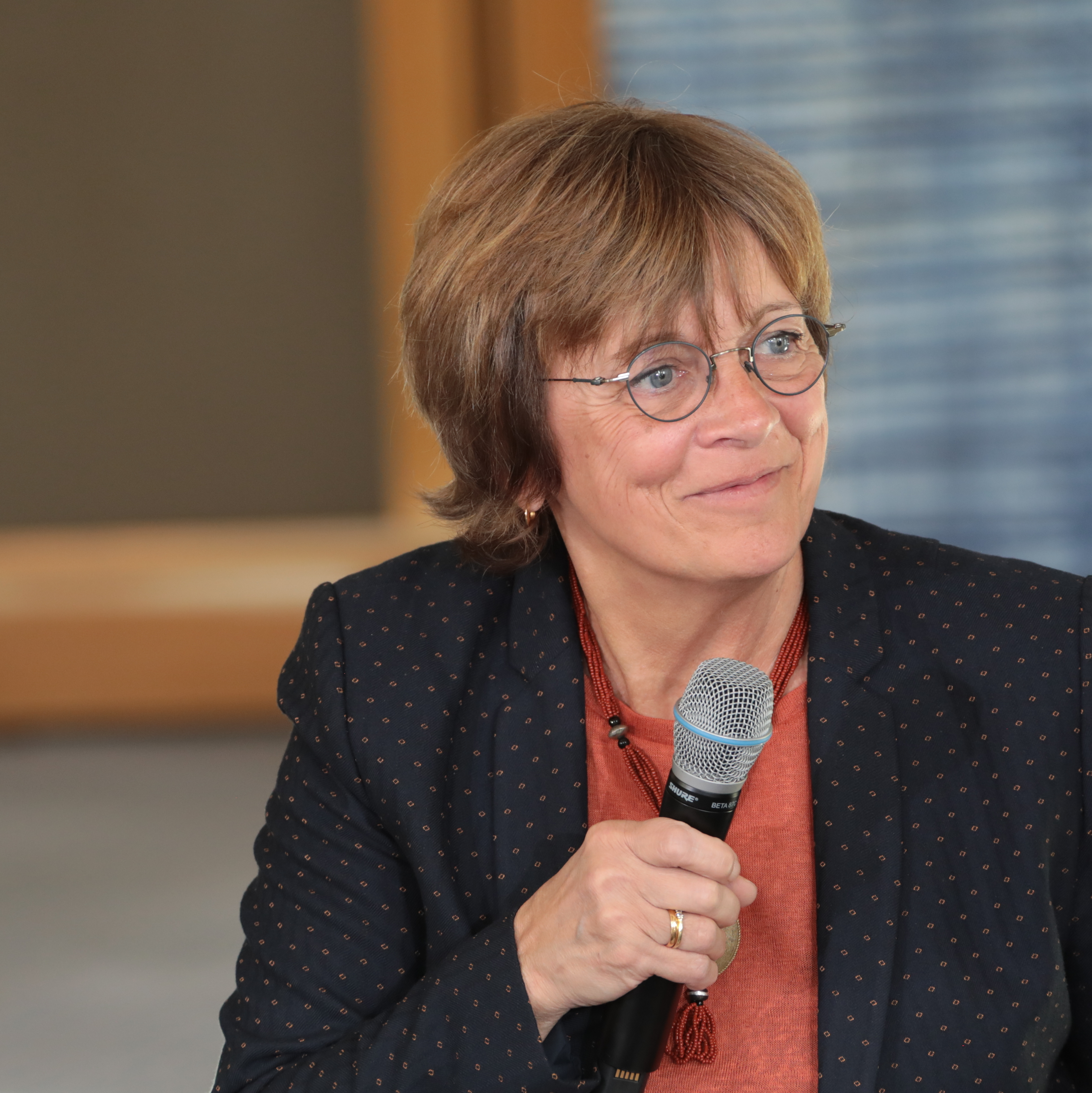
- Durant in 2019

Senator
- In office 2003 – June 2011

Personal details
- Born: 4 September 1954 (age 71)
- Party: Ecolo; The Greens–European Free Alliance
- Spouse: Jean-Claude Willame
- Website: www.isabelledurant.be

Isabelle Annie J. Durant (born 4 September 1954) is a Belgian politician of the Ecolo party who served as Deputy Secretary-General of the United Nations Conference on Trade and Development (UNCTAD) from 2017 to 2021 and as acting Secretary-General of the organisation from 2021 to 2022.

== Early life and education ==
Durant graduated as a nurse, then became a vocational trainer for the care sector, and worked with schools in working-class districts. She later complemented her nursing degree with a bachelor's degree in social and economic politics from the Université catholique de Louvain.

== Political career ==
- 1994–1999 : Federal Secretary and Spokesperson of Ecolo (with Jacky Morael and Dany Josse, then Jacky Morael and Jean-Luc Roland)

=== Deputy Prime Minister of Belgium, 1999–2003 ===
Between 1999 and 2003, Durant served as Deputy Prime Minister and Minister of Mobility and Transport in the Belgian federal government, Guy Verhofstadt's first government.

In 2003, Durant and her party colleague Olivier Deleuze resigned from Verhofstadt's government one week before the national elections and after a clash over the issue of night flights from Brussels Airport.

=== Member of the Senate, 2003–2011 ===
Durant was a member of the Senate between 2003 and 2011. As a Senator, she served on Committees for Foreign Affairs, Social Affairs and participated in many elections observation missions (Democratic Republic of the Congo, Egypt, Tunisia) (2003-2009).

From 2004, Durnat also served as Federal Secretary and Spokesperson of Ecolo, this time with Jean-Michel Javaux and Claude Brouir but also as a replacement for Evelyne Huytebroeck who became minister in the Government of the Brussels-Capital Region.

=== Member of the European Parliament, 2009–2014 ===
Durant became a Member of the European Parliament in the 2009 European elections. She served as Vice President of the European Parliament under the leadership of president Martin Schulz between 2009 and 2014. In addition, she was a member of the Committee on Budgets, the delegation for relations with Iran and the delegation to the ACP–EU Joint Parliamentary Assembly. In 2012, she also served on a cross-party working group which presented new rules for what gifts MEPs might accept.

On 15 September 2010 Durant supported the new initiative Spinelli Group in the European Parliament, which was founded to reinvigorate the strive for federalisation of the European Union (EU). Other prominent supporters include Jacques Delors, Daniel Cohn-Bendit, Guy Verhofstadt, Andrew Duff and Elmar Brok.

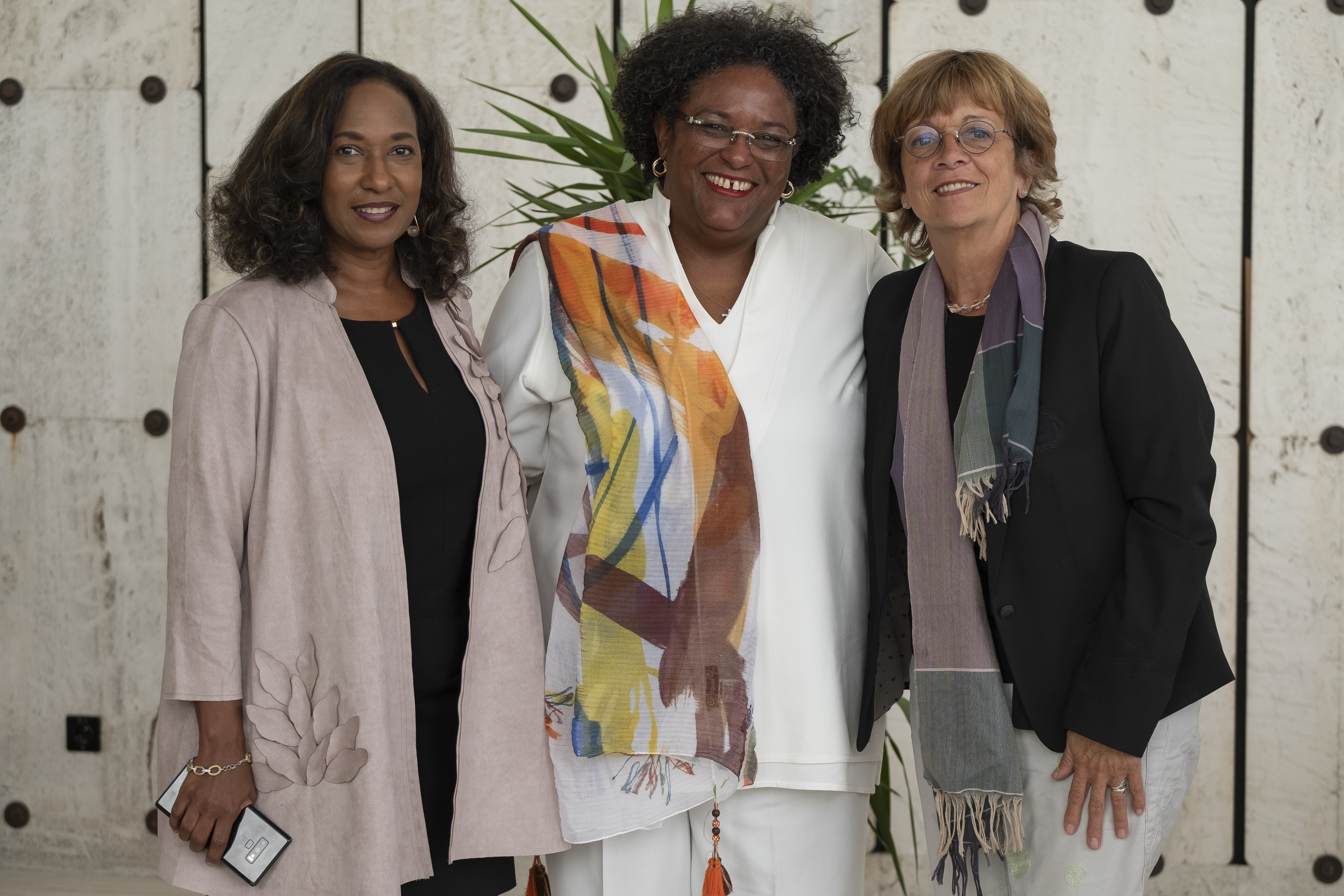
Pamela Coke-Hamilton, Prime Minister Mia Mottley and Durant.

In December 2013, Durant led a European Parliament delegation – including Tarja Cronberg, Cornelia Ernst Marietje Schaake and Josef Weidenholzer – visiting Tehran where members met parliament speaker Ali Larijani and his brother, Mohammad Javad Larijani, head of the judiciary's high council on human rights; human rights lawyer Nasrin Sotoudeh; and filmmaker Jafar Panahi.

=== Career at UNCTAD, 2017–2022 ===
In June 2017, United Nations Secretary-General António Guterres, in consultation with Mukhisa Kituyi, decided to appoint Durant as Deputy Secretary-General of the United Nations Conference on Trade and Development (UNCTAD). Durant succeeded Joakim Reiter. On 16 February 2021, Durant replaced Mukhisa Kituyi at the head of the organisation, becoming acting Secretary-General 2022.

== Other activities ==
- Friends of Europe, Member of the Board of Trustees (since 2020)

== Honours ==
- 2014: Grand Officer Order of Leopold
