= Raymond Kahungu Mbemba =

Congolese politician, former Secretary General of the UDPS

- Born: 7 May 1960 (age 65)

Raymond Kahungu Mbemba (born 7 May 1960) is a Congolese politician and businessman in the commune of Ngiri-Ngiri in Kinshasa, capital of the Democratic Republic of Congo. He was nicknamed Ya Ray, Marshal, or El Commandante.

He is founder and general coordinator of an anti-system citizen movement, Place au Peuple, and several other Congolese civil society associations.

== Career ==
His career (1984–1994) ended at the Studies and Planning Unit of the Treasury Department. Raymond Kahungu was elected President of the Union Delegation of the Ministry of Finance while he was on his return to the country. He became one of the members of the Public Service Union Delegation. He took part in the consultations organized by Marshal Mobutu Sese Seko in 1990 to achieve democratic opening. With the collaboration of other civil servants and students, he created the Jeunesse Actuelle association. A few months after the ouster of Étienne Tshisekedi from the prime ministership, an order from the Minister of Civil Service illegally retired him at the age of 34.

=== Political career ===
Until his retirement order, Raymond Kahungu worked within the Union for Democracy and Social Progress (UDPS). In 1984, Raymond Kahungu was frequenting UDPS circles through Hubert Mbongopasi Muresem, who was excluded from the National University of Zaire, for his participation in the first public meeting of the UDPS.

He participates in the meetings of his housing unit of the Uele District. Following the reforms of the Bondeko Conclave in 1995, notably the creation of the position of Secretary General of the Party, Raymond Kahungu was designated National Secretary for Youth Movements of the UDPS.

=== Movements ===
For the 2011 elections, among the matters on the agenda are the nomination of the party candidate for the election presidential or campaign slogan. Raymond Kahungu, with Jean-Marie Vianney Kabukanyi, proposed the campaign slogan "Le Peuple D'Abord".

Starting with the trade union movement, which led him to participate in the work of the Sovereign National Conference, Raymond subsequently created dozens of non-profit organizations and NGOs. He is the founder of the anti-system citizen movement called Place au Peuple.

=== Aftermath ===
The CEREPRO Study Office (Cercle of Reflections and Prospective Studies of the UDPS), of which Raymond Kahungu was the Deputy General Treasurer, suggested the creation of the post of Secretary General, whose mission will be the daily management of the party. CEREPRO suggests to the founders to meet in Congress to comply with the conditions of modifications provided for by the Party Statutes. The holding of the Bondeko Conclave of 1995 was later done; it introduced the position of Secretary General into the structure of UDPS. Until 1995, the UDPS was organized under a structure called JUDPS (Youth of the UDPS). After the Conclave of the founders of the Bondeko Center Party in 1995, and on the proposal of CEREPRO, the Secretary General of the Party decided on the name UDPS Youth Movements. Two years later, the participants adopted the proposal of Raymond Kahungu.

On 15 August 1992, the Sovereign National Conference, through its 2,500 delegates from all the 11 provinces of the country at the time, elected Étienne Tshisekedi Wa Mulumba, president of the UDPS, to the post of Prime Minister and head of government. The CNS charged him with preparing for the Third Republic over a period of 2 years.
