= Jacques Brassinne de La Buissière =

Belgian political scientist (1929–2023)

- Born: 7 September 1929; Ixelles, Belgium
- Died: 31 January 2023 (aged 93); Bossière, Belgium
- Occupation: civil servant
- Notable work: "Enquête sur la mort de Lumumba"

Chevalier Jacques Joseph Brassinne de La Buissière (7 September 1929 – 31 January 2023) was a Belgian political scientist, author, and civil servant.

== Early life ==
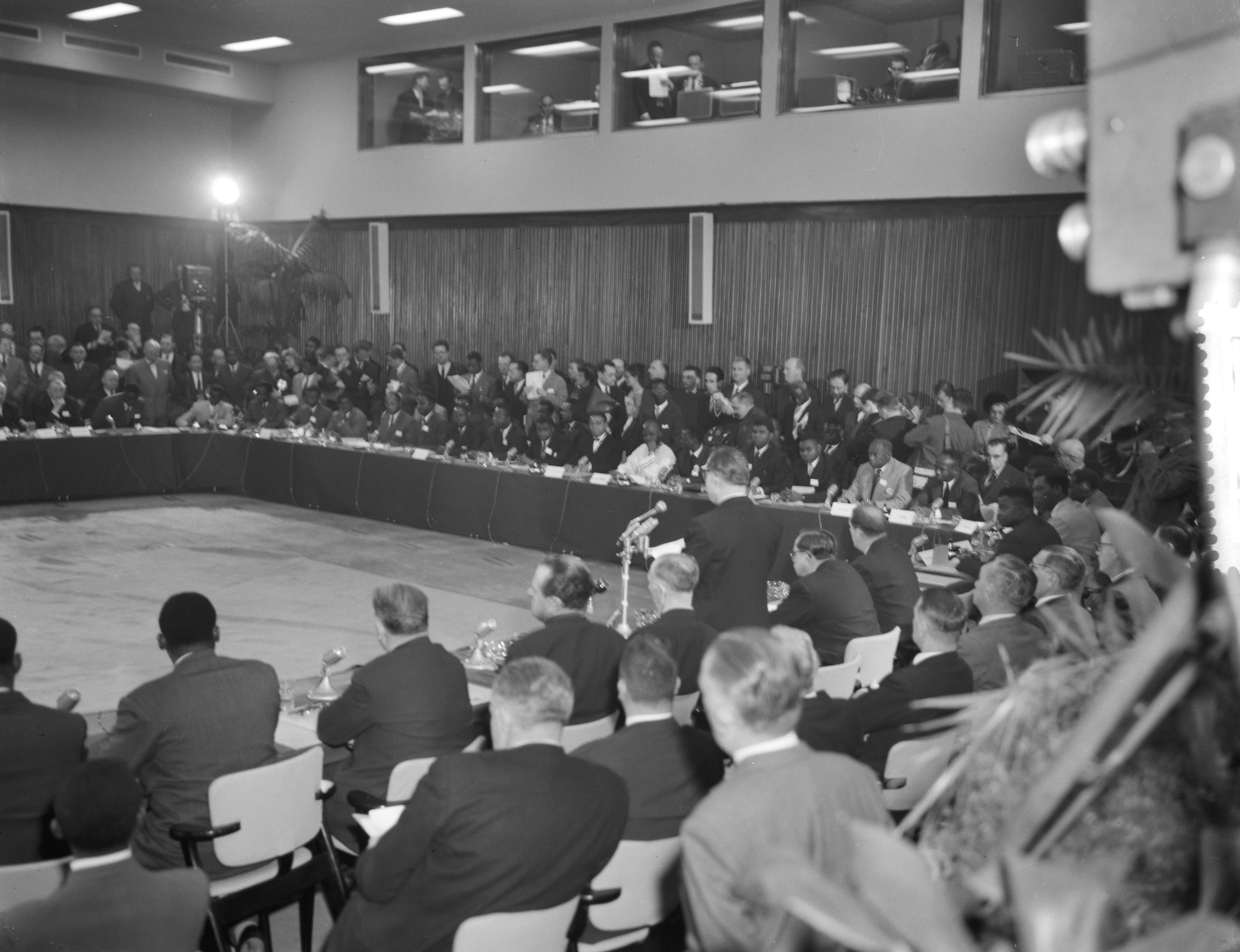
The Belgo-Congolese Roundtable Conference, 1960.

Brassinne studied political science at the Brussels Université libre de Bruxelles, as well as several foreign universities, including Harvard Business School. He also became a reserve officer for the armoured corps. His first governmental position was as an attaché at the cabinet of Vice-Premier Albert Lilar from 1958 to 1960, where he was notably charged with questions regarding the Belgian Congo and Ruanda-Urundi. He was one of the organisers of the Roundtable Conference in early 1960.

== Career in Congo ==
Brassinne occupied several positions, first in the Belgian Congo, and from 1960 in the independent Congo-Léopoldville. From 28 June to 18 August 1960, he was the deputy chief of the administrative assistance section of the Belgian diplomatic mission in Léopoldville. From July 1960 to January 1961, he was a chargé de mission of the Ministry of African Affairs (successor of the Ministry of the Colonies. On 18 August 1960, Brassinne was recruited in Mistebel, the office of technical assistance headed by Harold Charles d'Aspremont Lynden, where he worked until 29 January 1961. This office was not only founded to provide training to the authorities in the recently seceded State of Katanga, but also to provide arms coming from Kamina and other places where airplanes and other military materiel of the Force Publique was left. From 27 September 1960, he was a chargé de mission for the Ministry of African Affairs in Élisabethville.

From September 1961 until January 1962, he was a civil servant for the State of Katanga, being a member of the consultancy office (bureau-conseil) of the State. He was charged by the Katangese Ministry of National Education, headed by Minister Joseph Kiwele, with the foundation and organisation of a school of public administration.

From September 1964 to November 1965, Brassinne was a chargé de mission for the Ministry of Foreign Affairs in Congo. He was an adviser to Moïse Tshombe who, from being the secessionist Katangese President in the period 1960–1963, became the Prime Minister of the reunified Congo.

=== Murder of Lumumba ===
Brassinne defended his PhD thesis in political science in 1991 at the Université libre de Bruxelles. The document discusses, in great detail, the circumstances about the murder of Patrice Lumumba, first Prime Minister of the independent Congo and adversary of the Katangese authorities. The jury, consisting of academics such as Jean Stengers, gave him the highest grade. The thesis uses a great deal of first-hand witnesses and is also based on the author's own experience in the region. In the wake of the Belgian parliamentary inquiry into the murder of Lumumba, where Brassinne himself testified and which makes extensive use of his PhD thesis, his thesis was published online.

In 2011, Lumumba's son François Lumumba pressed charges against Brassinne and several other individuals regarding Lumumba's assassination.

== Career in Belgium ==
Upon his return to Belgium, Brassinne worked for the Centre de recherche et d'information socio-politiques (CRISP), research centre where Jules Gérard-Libois and Benoît Verhaegen worked as well. He was its vice-president, next to his engagements as a member of the Jean Gol centre.

As a civil servant, he worked at the cabinets of several liberal politicians. In 1980, he became the deputy chef de cabinet of André Bertouille, Secretary of State of the Walloon region.From 1981 to 1983, he was the chef de cabinet to Jean Gol, Vice-Premier, Minister of Justice and Institutional Reforms. From 1983 to 1985, he occupied the same position at the cabinet of Secretary of State of Development Cooperation François-Xavier de Donnéa. He remained in office when de Donnéa was Minister of National Defence from 1985 to 1988. In 1988, he became the president of the board of directors of the National Orchestra of Belgium.

Brassinne was the general director at the administration of the Walloon region. Afterwards, from 1999 to 2003, he became a chargé de mission and expert to the cabinet of Interior Minister Antoine Duquesne. He occupied the same position from 2003 to 2004 at the cabinet of the Minister of Development Cooperation Marc Verwilghen.

== Distinctions ==
On 1 August 1988, king Baudouin granted Jacques Brassinne the Belgian noble title of knight (French: chevalier; Dutch: ridder). In 1993, members of the Brassinne family were allowed to change their name to Brassinne de La Buissière.

== Death ==
Jacques Brassinne de La Buissière died in Bossière on 31 January 2023, at the age of 93.
