= Pius Ngandu Nkashama =

Congolese professor, writer, playwright, poet and literary critic

Pius Ngandu Nkashama was a professor, writer, playwright, poet and literary critic. He was born on September 4, 1946 in Mbujimayi in the province of Kasai Oriental in the Democratic Republic of the Congo. He died on December 19, 2023 in Baton-Rouge, Louisiana, US.

== Education and academic career ==
After earning a degree in philosophy and letters from Lovanium University in 1970, he was appointed assistant professor and then professor at the National University of Zaire (Lubumbashi). He also led the Centre for African Studies. In the late 1970s, he moved to France where he obtained in 1981 a Doctorate in Literature and Humanities at the University of Strasbourg. He then traveled the world, teaching in various universities (Annaba and Constantine in Algeria, Limoges and the Sorbonne in France). In 2000, he settled in the United States, working from then up through his final years as professor of French Language and Literature at Louisiana State University.

=== Academic positions held ===
- 1970-1975: Assistant then Senior Researcher at Lovanium University in Kinshasa as well as at the National University of Zaire (Lubumbashi Campus) in the French Department, Faculty of Arts.
- 1975-1978: Associate Professor, National University of Zaire in the French Department, Faculty of Arts.
- 1978-1980: Honorary Professor at the National University of Zaire and at the Higher Teacher Training Institute of Kananga.
- 1979-1982: Professor and Department Head at the National University of Zaire and at the National Institute of Arts in Kinshasa.
- 1982-1989: Assistant Professor then Associate Professor at the University of Annaba (Algeria).
- 1989-1990: Professor at the University of Annaba and University of Mentouri in Constantine (Algeria).
- 1990-1991: Associate Professor and Visiting Lecturer at the University of Limoges (France) in the French Department, Faculty of Arts.
- 1991-1997: Lecturer at the University of Limoges in the French Department, Faculty of Arts.
- 1997-1998: Lecturer at the University of Paris III-Sorbonne Nouvelle.
- 1997-1998: Associate Professor at the University of Limoges (Department of General and Comparative Literature, Faculty of Arts).
- 1998-2000: Associate Professor at the University of Paris III-Sorbonne Nouvelle.
- 2000-2023: Professor at Louisiana State University (Department of French Studies).

== Awards ==
In 2004, he received the Fonlon-Nichols Award, which recognizes African writers for "excellence in creative writing and contributions to the struggle for human rights and freedom of expression".

== Published works ==
=== Novels ===
==== In French ====
- En suivant le sentier sous les palmiers, L'Harmattan, 2009.
- La rédemption de Sha Ilunga, L'Harmattan, 2007.
- Les magiciens du repentir, Les confessions de Frère Dominique -Sakombi Inongo, L'Harmattan, 1995.
- Citadelle d'espoir, L'Harmattan,1995.
- Le doyen marri, coll. Encres noires, L'Harmattan, 1994.
- Le fils du mercenaire, Hurtubise, 1993.
- Un jour de grand soleil sur les montagnes de l'Éthiopie, L'Harmattan, 1991.
- Les étoiles écrasées, Publisud, 1988.
- Vie et mœurs d'un primitif en Essonne quatre-vingt-onze, L'Harmattan, 1987.
- La mort faite homme, L'Harmattan, 1986.
- Le pacte de sang, L'Harmattan, 1984.
- La malédiction, Silex, 1983.

==== In Tshiluba ====
- Bidi ntwilu, bidi mpelelu, éditions Impala, Lubumbashi, 1997.
- Tuntuntu, ntuntu, éditions Giraf – Baton Difunda, Paris, 2002 (republished in 2003).
- Mulongeshi Wanyi ntuntu, éditions Giraf, Paris, 2003.

=== Stories ===
- Yakouta, L'Harmattan, coll. Encres noires, 1995.
- Un matin pour Loubène, Hurtubise, 1991.
- Les enfants du lac Tana, Hurtubise, 1991.
- Des mangroves en terre haute, L'Harmattan, 1991.
- Églises nouvelles et mouvements religieux: l'exemple zaïrois, L'Harmattan - Paris - 1990.
- Le fils de la tribu suivi de La mulâtresse Anna, NEA Dakar, 1983.

=== Novellas ===
- Mariana suivi de Yolena et de La chanson de Mariana, L'Harmattan, 2006.
- La malédiction, éditions Nouvelles du Sud, 2001.

=== Plays ===
- May Britt de Santa Cruz, L'Harmattan, coll. encres noires, (1993) (republished in 2003).
- L'empire des ombres vivantes, Lansman, 1991/2002.
- Bonjour monsieur le Ministre, Silex, 1983.
- Nous aurions fait un rêve, Institut National des Arts (INA), Kinshasa, 1980.
- La délivrance d'Ilunga, Pierre Jean Oswald, 1977.

=== Stagings of plays ===
- La délivrance d'Ilunga, staged by the University Troupe, at the Lubumbashi Campus in 1982 and 1984, and at the Kinshasa Campus in 1988.
- Bonjour monsieur le Ministre, staged by the University Troupe at the Lubumbashi Campus in 1986; staged in Brussels by the Baobab Company in 1988.
- L'empire des ombres vivantes, read by the Magasin d'écriture théâtrale at the Festival International des Francophonies in Limoges and Brussels in 1991.
- May Britt de Santa Cruz, read and staged at Santa Fe, Argentina in 1994.

=== Essays, studies and literary criticism ===
- Écrire à l'infinitif: la déraison de l'écriture dans les romans de Williams Sassine, Critique littéraire, L'Harmattan, 2006.
- Les années littéraires en Afrique, 1912-1987 (vol. 1), L'Harmattan, 2003.
- Les années littéraires en Afrique, 1987-1992 (vol. 2), L'Harmattan, 1993.
- Enseigner les littératures africaines, aux origines de la négritude (vol. 1), L'Harmattan, 2000.
- Mémoire et écriture de l'histoire dans "Les écailles du ciel" de Tierno Monenembo, L'Harmattan, 1999.
- Sémantique et morphologie du verbe en ciluba, L'Harmattan, coll. sémantiques, 1999.
- Ruptures et écritures de violence, Études sur le roman et les littératures africaines contemporaines, critiques littéraires, L'Harmattan, 1998.
- Théâtre et scènes de spectacles, étude littéraire, L'Harmattan, 1993.
- Négritude et poétique, une lecture de l'œuvre de L. Sédar Senghor, L'Harmattan, 1992.

== Studies of the author's work ==
- José Watunda Kangandio, Les ressources du discours polémique dans le roman de Pius Ngandu Nkashama, L'Harmattan, Paris, 2011, 312 p. ISBN 978-2-296-13872-8 (based on a doctoral thesis)
- Béatrice Nijimbere, Le narrateur multiple dans l'œuvre romanesque de Pius Ngandu Nkashama, Université de Limoges, 2010, 264 p. (doctoral thesis)
- Alexie Tcheuyap, Pius Ngandu Nkashama : trajectoires d'un discours, L'Harmattan, 2007, 350 p. ISBN 978-2-296-03801-1
