= Jules Gérard-Libois =

Belgian historian & writer (1923–2005)

- Born: 3 December 1923; Ougrée, Seraing
- Died: 26 December 2005 (aged 82); Ixelles, Brussels
- Education: University of Liège

Jules Gérard-Libois (Ougrée (Seraing), 3 December 1923 – Ixelles (Brussels), 26 December 2005) was a Belgian historian and writer. He notably founded and presided over the Centre for Socio-Political Research and Information (Centre de recherche et d'information socio-politiques, or CRISP), known for its series of working papers entitled Courriers hedomadaires (Weekly Letters) which he created in 1958, together with Jean Ladrière, François Perin, and Jean Neuville. For years, Gérard-Libois provided commentary by the elections at the francophone Belgian public broadcaster RTBF.

He co-founded the Centre d'études et de documentation africaines (African Study and Documentation Centre). He was a member of the group surrounding the journal Esprit, and on the steering committee of La Revue Nouvelle. Gérard-Libois was one of the experts appointed to oversee the tasks of the Lumumba Commission, the Belgian parliamentary inquiry into the circumstances of the murders of former Congolese prime minister Patrice Lumumba and his allies Maurice Mpolo and Joseph Okito. He was the honorary director of information at the European Commission.

== Biography ==
Jules Gérard-Libois was born in 1923. He studied law at the University of Liège. In the wake of the Second World War, he became editor-in-chief of the Belgian edition of Témoignage chrétien, which placed him in the camp of progressive christians.

He participated in the creation of Esprit groups in Belgium under the auspices of Emmanuel Mounier, with Jean Ladrière, Jacques Taminiaux and François Perin. He was a journalist at La Cité from 1950 to 1957, but realised that he lacked the tools to analyse the Belgian political realities. This was why he founded CRISP.

When the Lumumba commission was being assembled, Gérard-Libois was selected as one of twelve candidates who applied, four of whom were selected. Besides Gérard-Libois, Emmanuel Gérard (KU Leuven), Luc De Vos (KU Leuven and Royal Military Academy), and Philippe Raxhon (University of Liège) were part of the expert group. Gérard-Libois was, however, the only expert who had an extensive knowledge of the socio-political background to the events, as the only expert on African history. Gérard-Libois, 76 years old at the time, was not primarily an archival researcher.

Known for his many publications about the history of the Democratic Republic of the Congo (DRC) since the era of the Belgian Congo, Gérard-Libois set himself apart, together with Benoît Verhaegen, from the colonial circles by writing the history of the DRC in a non-sentimental style. They managed to disseminate many sources on Congolese history: the Congo series from 1959 to 1967, suspended by President Mobutu Sese Seko after the establishment of the one-party rule by the Popular Movement of the Revolution.

== Centre d'études et de documentation africaines (CEDAF) ==
The Royal Museum for Central Africa in Tervuren, Belgium, holds Gérard-Libois's archival collection as the founder of CEDAF, which is integrated into the museum as the section of contemporary history. The collection contains, among other sources, an important body of photographs relating to Congolese independence day and the postcolonial period. It includes the sound recordings of the Belgo-Congolese Round Table Conference of 1960, next to a collection of books and journals. The collection is made up of documents collected from 1958 to 2004, the time span of Gérard-Libois's professional life.

The historical period of the archival collection goes from the 1940s, to the assumption of power by Laurent-Désiré Kabila in 1997. One subset contains sources related to the parliamentary inquiry into the murder of Lumumba. Another is related to the role of Che Guevara in the Congolese rebellions in 1965. Others relate to Congo during the Second World War (1940–1945), the period immediately preceding independence (1960), the Mobutu regime (1965–1993), and Laurent-Désiré Kabila (1979–1999), among other subsets.

== Publications ==
- La décision politique en Belgique en 1965.
- Sécession au Katanga, Centre de recherche et d'information socio-politiques, 1963, 2 volumes.
- Léopold III, de l'an 40 à l'effacement, with José Gotovitch, 1991.
- La Belgique entre dans la guerre froide et l'Europe (1947-1953), with Roseline Lewin, 1992.
- Belgique-Congo 1960 : le 30 juin pourquoi, Lumumba comment, le portefeuille pour qui, with Jean Heinen, De Boeck Supérieur, 1993.
- Congo 1960: Échec d'une décolonisation, with Colette Braeckman, Jean Kestergat, Jacques Vanderlinden, Benoît Verhaegen, and Jean-Claude Willame, and André Versaille, 2010.
