= Benoît Verhaegen =

Belgian academic (1929–2009)

- Born: 8 January 1929; Merelbeke, Belgium
- Died: 14 October 2009 (aged 80); Montréal-les-Sources, France

Academic background
- Education: Catholic University of Leuven

Academic work
- Discipline: Historian and political scientist
- Institutions: Lovanium University; National University of Zaire; University of Kisangani
- Main interests: Politics and history of the Democratic Republic of the Congo

Benoît Verhaegen (1929–2009) was a Belgian academic and Africanist who specialised in the political sociology and post-colonial history of the Democratic Republic of the Congo.

Born into a Belgian aristocratic family, Verhaegen fought as a volunteer in the Korean War. He embarked on an academic career after his return to Belgium and took up a post in the Belgian Congo in 1959 shortly before its independence. Verhaegen's progressive political views meant that he sympathised with African nationalism and he remained in the country on-and-off until 1987. He taught at various universities in the Congo which became Zaire in 1971 and he became increasingly influenced by Marxism and Maoism.

Verhaegen's scholarly research was focused particularly on contemporary political movements in the Congo in the 1960s and 1970s. He termed his object of study "immediate history" (histoire immédiate) and published a number of important articles, books, and collections of documents.

== Early life and the Korean War ==
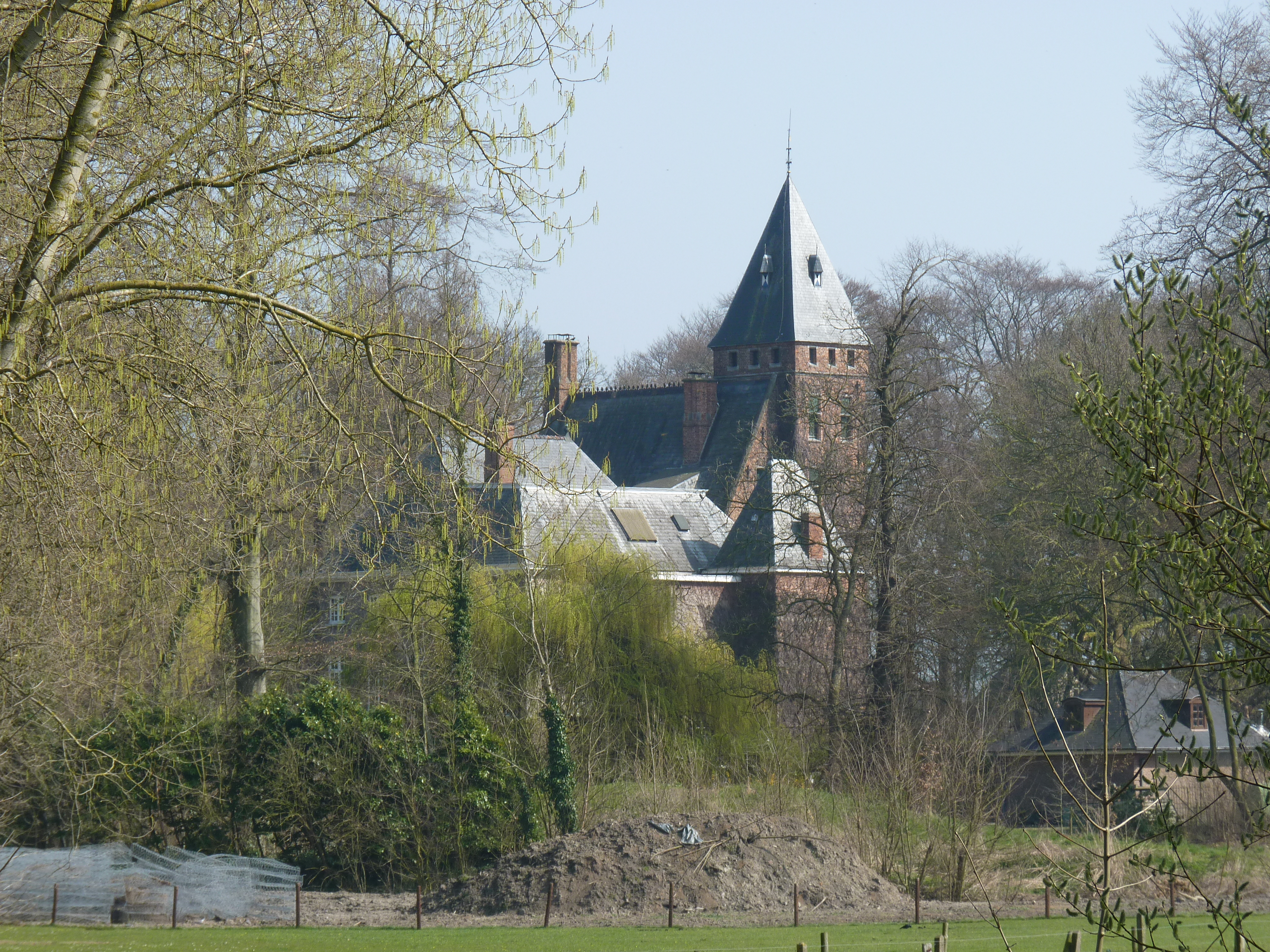
The Kasteel Blauwhuys in Merelbeke in which Verhaegen grew up

Benoît Verhaegen was born into aristocratic family at Merelbeke, East Flanders in Belgium on 8 January 1929. He was the youngest son of Jean Verhaegen and his wife Simone Piers de Raveschoot. His grandfather, Arthur Verhaegen (1847 – 1917) had been a member of parliament for the Catholic Party and a leading exponent of Christian Democracy.

Verhaegen was studying at the University of Ghent in August 1950, when he enlisted in the Belgian Volunteer Corps for Korea raised to participate in the Korean War. A few months earlier, South Korea had been invaded by communist North Korea and a coalition of military forces from the United Nations had been assembled to aid the South Koreans. Verhaegen served in the Korean War as a platoon commander and was twice wounded in action. He claimed his desire to fight in the conflict stemmed from his belief in an impending world war and a desire to live up to his family's tradition of military service. He later wrote a memoir of his experience during the conflict entitled A Season in Korea (Une saison en Corée).

After returning from Korea, Verhaegen enrolled in the Catholic University of Leuven where he gained doctorates in law and economics with a thesis entitled "Contribution to the Economic History of Flanders". He gained a post as lecturer at Lovanium University at Léopoldville, Belgian Congo in 1959.

== Academic career and the Congo ==
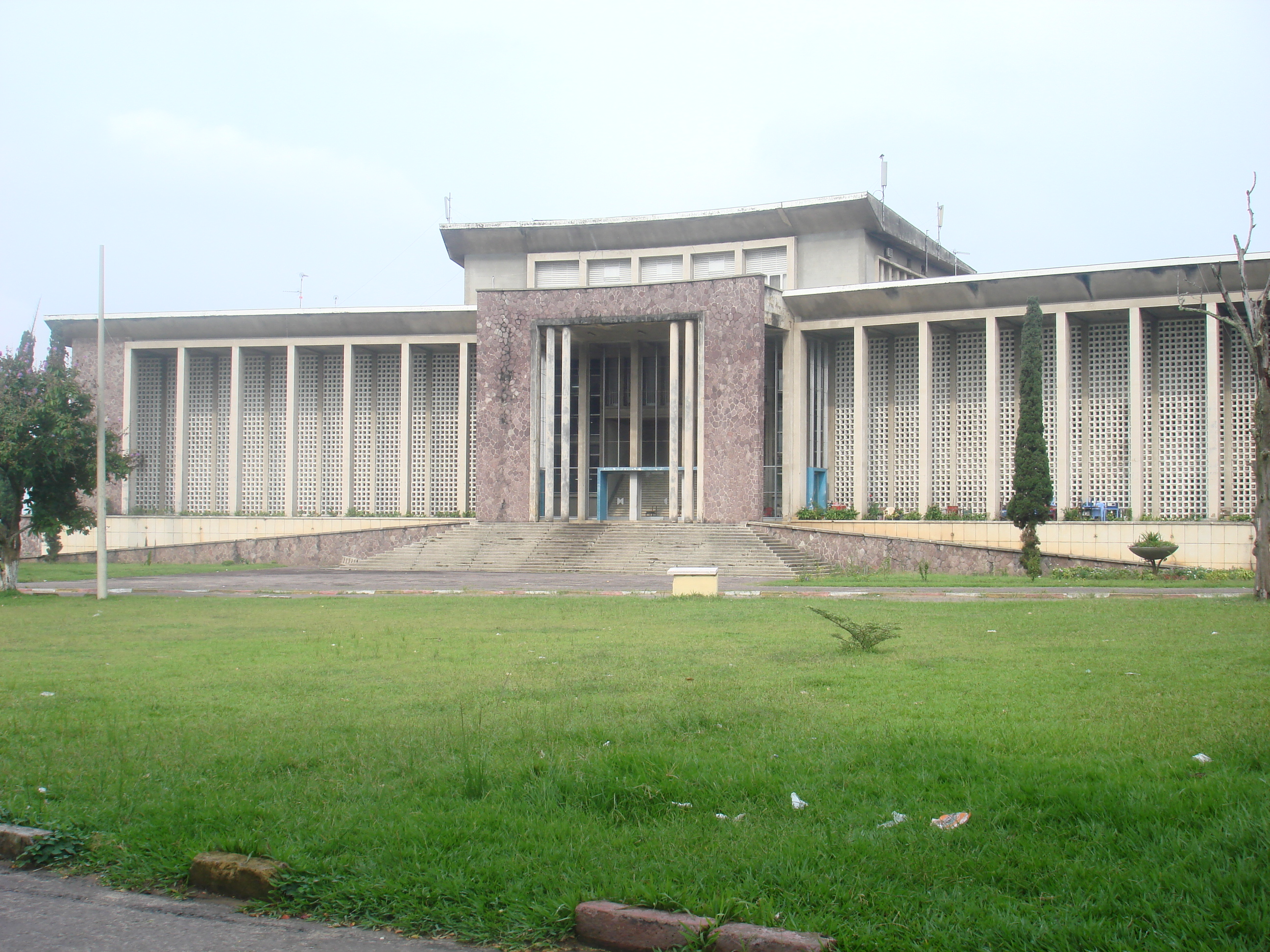
Buildings of the former Lovanium University in the modern University of Kinshasa

Verhaegen arrived in the Belgian Congo in 1959 and remained in the country after independence in 1960, during the Congo Crisis at Lovanium. His politics had become increasingly left-wing and "progressive" (progressiste) and he openly sympathised with the emerging African nationalist movement. Involved in nationalist politics, he served as chef de cabinet to Aloïs Kabangi, Minister of Economic Co-ordination and Planning, in the Lumumba Government. However, he became increasing disenchanted with the established political groups during the crisis. Although remaining a Catholic, his views became increasingly radical over the course of his career and embraced Marxism and Maoism as a route towards agrarian socialism in the Congo.

Verhaegen began researching political movements in the Congo in the aftermath of independence and formulated the idea of "immediate history" (histoire immédiate) which mixed anthropological, historical, and sociological approaches to current events on an extensive documentary basis. He was involved in collecting documents published by contemporary political actors in the Congo and intended his work to be interacting with political actors. He wrote important studies on the Kwilu rebellion (1963–64), the nationalist leader Patrice Lumumba and the Alliance des Bakongo (ABAKO) political party.

Together with Jules Gérard-Libois and Jean Van Lierde, Verhaegen began involved in the new "African section" of the Socio-Political Research and Information Centre (Centre de recherche et d'information socio-politiques, CRISP) in Belgium which published important series of documents on contemporary Congolese politics. This was disbanded in 1971 and Verhaegen became the director of the African Studies and Documentation Centre (Centre d’Études et de Documentation africaines, CEDAF) which replaced it. He directed its journal series Cahiers du CEDAF which was superseded by Cahiers africains. He also led the creation of a historical research section at the Royal Museum for Central Africa in Tervuren, Belgium.

Verhaegen continued to teach at Lovanium but became critical of the "colonial" values he believed the institution embodied. He moved to Kisangani in 1971 as part of the consolidation of university education by the Mobutu regime under the National University of Zaire (Université nationale du Zaïre, UNAZA). He founded the Interdisciplinary Research Centre for the Development of Education (Centre de Recherches interdisciplinaires pour le Développement de l’Éducation, CRIDE) and headed the university's social science section at Kisangani, later the University of Kisangani. He left the Congo in 1987 to return to academic roles in Belgium. He retired in 1990.

A festschrift in Verhaegen's honour entitled Le Zaïre à l'épreuve de l'histoire immédiate was published in 1993, and included contributions by Immanuel Wallerstein and Catherine Coquery-Vidrovitch.

== Retirement ==
On 24 September 2001, Verhaegen was interrogated by the Belgian Parliamentary Commission of Inquiry regarding his role in the assassination of Lumumba. A note dated 12 September 1960 by the secretary of Belgian Minister without Portfolio Raymond Scheyven described the allocation of secret funds to several individuals, including Verhaegen. Anthropologist Anna Curtenius Roosevelt therefore concluded that "secret agent Benoît Verhaegen was secretly paid millions during the crisis to help eliminate Lumumba and other nationalists." Verhaegen explained that those funds were contributions for the creation of an International Centre for Cooperation and was labeled 'secret' since diplomatic relations between Belgium and the Congo were broken off. According to Verhaegen, those funds were thus used to pay for the payment and accommodation of technical cooperants. In a commentary on the workings of the Commission of Inquiry, he criticised that they failed to verify their claims by going to the archive of the International Centre for Cooperation at the Foreign Affairs Archives. Belgian academic Gauthier de Villers believed that "certain influential members of the group of experts or the Commission, too satisfied by being able to pinpoint in that way an engaged non-traditional and Marxist historian, were content with only doing a summary investigation."

He retired to France and died at Montréal-les-Sources, Drôme on 14 October 2009.

== See also ==
- Merwin Crawford Young
- Jan Vansina
- René Lemarchand
- Georges Balandier
- Jean Suret-Canale
