= Clémentine Faïk-Nzuji =

Congolese poet and writer (born 1944)

- Born: Clémentine Nzuji; 21 January 1944 (age 82); Tshofa, Kabinda District, Belgian Congo
- Other name: Clémentine Faïk-Nzuji Madiya
- Education: Lovanium University; University of Paris
- Occupation: Writer
- Children: 5

Clémentine Faïk-Nzuji Madiya (born Clémentine Nzuji, 21 January 1944) is a Congolese poet and writer. She was born in Tshofa, Kabinda District in the Belgian Congo. Albert S. Gérard calls her "the first poet of real significance" among a group of African writers who emerged in the late 1960s; she was also the first female writer in the Belgian Congo.

== Background and personal life ==
She graduated from Lovanium University. She also holds a doctorate in African studies from the University of Paris.

Nzuji is married and is the mother of five children, and many of her poems refer to her family.

== Literary activities ==
In 1964, she founded the Pléiade du Congo, a literary group in Kinshasa, and headed and helped found the International Centre for African Languages, Literatures and Traditions in favour of Development (CILTADE) at the Catholic University of Louvain. She has made important contributions in the study of Bantu linguistics and oral literature. She is also an award-winning author of short stories and poetry.

== Bibliography ==
- Murmures [Whispers] . Kinshasa: Lettres Congolaises, 1968 (15pp.). Poetry.
- Kasalà. Kinshasa: Editions Mandore, 1969 (45pp.). Poetry.
- Le temps des amants [The Time of Lovers]. Kinshasa: Editions Mandore, 1969. (54pp.). Poetry.
- Énigmes lubas = Nshinga : étude structurale. Kinshasa: Éditions de l'Université Lovanium, 1970. (169pp.). Riddles
- Lianes [The Creepers]. Kinshasa: Editions du Mont noir, 1971. (Series Jeune littérature no. 4) (31pp.). Poetry.
- Lenga et autres contes d'inspiration traditionnelle [Lenga and other traditional stories. Lubumbashi: Editions Saint-Paul Afrique, 1976 (80pp.). Tales.
- Gestes interrompus [Broken deeds]. Lubumbashi: Editions Mandore, 1976. (49pp.). (n.p.). Poetry.
- Cité de l'abondance [City of Abundance]. Unpublished. Won the only prize at the 1986 annual Competition of the Overseas Royal Academy, Brussels. Short story.
- Frisson de la mémoire [A ripple of memory] in Cluzeau Fiancée à vendre et treize autres nouvelles [A fiancée for sale and thirteen other short stories]. Saint-Maur: SEPIA, 1993. (pp. 203–229). Short story.
- Tracing Memory. A Glossary of Graphic Signs and Symbols in African Art and Culture, Canadian Museum of Civilization—Hull/Louvain-la-Neuve, International Centre for African Languages, Literature and Tradition.
