= Valentin Bankumuhari =

Burundian politician

Valentin Bankumuhari (1927 – 17 December 2016) was a Burundian politician.

== Early life ==
Valentin Bankumuhari was born in 1927 in Mwumba, Ruanda-Urundi. Ethnically, he was Tutsi. He was educated at seminaries in Mugera and Nyakibanda and attended Lovanium University.

== Political and government career ==
Following the end of his university studies, Bankumuhari returned to Burundi and became a political follower of Louis Rwagasore and joined the latter's party, the Union pour le Progrès national (UPRONA). In September 1961, he was elected as an UPRONA candidate to a seat in Urundi's Legislative Assembly representing Ijene and Kabarore with 79 percent of the vote. He chaired the body's foreign relations committee. In February 1962, he served as part of a Burundian delegation sent to the United Nations Headquarters to finalise the terms of Burundi's independence. In January 1965, he was arrested on suspicion that he was a co-conspirator in the assassination of Prime Minister Pierre Ngendandumwe, but was released without being charged. In May, he sought re-election to the Assembly seat, but lost to Parti du Peuple candidate Mbarushimana Philippe. The Assembly subsequently elected him to the Senate representing Ngozi Province.

== Later life ==
After suffering from poor health for several years, Bankumuhari died on 17 December 2016. He was buried on 26 December at Mpanda Cemetery.

== Works cited ==
- Russell, Aiden (2019). Politics and Violence in Burundi: The Language of Truth in an Emerging State. Cambridge: Cambridge University Press. ISBN 978-1-108-49934-7.
- Weinstein, Warren (1976). Historical Dictionary of Burundi. Metuchen: Scarecrow Press. ISBN 9780810809628.
