= Barthélémy Bisengimana =

Rwandan politician (born 1935)

Barthélémy Bisengimana Rwema (born 12 May 1935) was a Zairean official who served as head of the Bureau of the President under Mobutu Sese Seko from May 1969 to February 1977. Bisengimana was a member of the Tutsi ethnic group whose rise to prominence was largely the result of the complete dependence of the Banyarwanda upon the central government for power, which made them reliable supporters. A native of Cyangugu Province in Rwanda, in 1961 Bisengimana was the first graduate with a degree in electrical engineering from Lovanium University in Kinshasa.

Bisengima's aided many Rwandan Tutsis in North and South Kivu to acquire land and start lucrative businesses. Andre Kalinda, a chief of the Hunde and territorial administrator of Masisi, became the most powerful chief due to his connections with both Bisengimana and the Acogenoki. At his height in 1972, Bisengimana managed to get the Political Bureau of the ruling Mouvement Populaire de la Révolution (MPR) to pass a citizenship decree in which everyone originating from "Ruanda-Urundi" and residing in then-Belgian Congo on or before January 1950 was automatically granted citizenship. This Law 72-002 amended the MPR's statutes and became referred to as "Article 15". When the law, which further allowed the new citizens to claim land rights, went into effect in 1973, a number of Tutsi refugees legally received plantations and ranches that had been previously owned by Belgian settlers. Among these was Bisengimana, who claimed the Osso concession, which contained the largest number of cattle owned by white settlers in Masisi.

Bisengimana was dismissed in 1977, followed allegations of getting kickbacks from a textile plant in Kisangani. Following his removal, there was increasing pressure to reverse Article 15, resulting in the passing of Law 81-002 on 29 June 1981.
