= Luc Gillon =

Belgian priest and nuclear physicist

Monseigneur Luc Gillon
- Born: 15 September 1920; Rochefort
- Died: 5 June 1998 (aged 77); Brussels
- Occupations: Priest, nuclear physicist
- Known for: Construction of the first nuclear reactor in Africa

Monseigneur Luc Gillon was a Belgian priest and nuclear scientist. He became the first rector of Lovanium University (now the University of Kinshasa) in Léopoldville from 1954 to 1967. Gillon played a significant role in the construction of the first nuclear reactor Trico I in Africa, located on the Lovanium campus in 1959.

== Life ==
Gillon was born in Rochefort on 15 September 1920. After being ordained priest at Easter 1946 by Cardinal Van Roey, he received in 1952 his doctorate in physical sciences, specializing in nuclear energy, at the Catholic University of Louvain. In 1952, he was invited as "guest staff member" at the Palmer Physics Laboratory at Princeton University. He was appointed protonotary apostolic in 1957.

Monseigneur Gillon went to the Belgian Congo and became the first rector of Lovanium University (now the University of Kinshasa) in Léopoldville from 1954 to 1967. Upon his return to Belgium in 1972, he became the Dean of the Faculty of Science at UCLouvain, where he taught until 1987. Gillon also served as the Governor for Belgium at the International Atomic Energy Agency in Vienna, as vice-president and then board member of the Belgian Nuclear Research Center.

Honorary canon of St. Rumbold's Cathedral, Gillon holds a number of Belgian and foreign awards, as well as honorary doctorates from several universities.

He died at the age of 77 on 5 June 1998, and was laid to rest in the Rochefort cemetery after a funeral in Louvain-la-Neuve.

== Nuclear energy ==
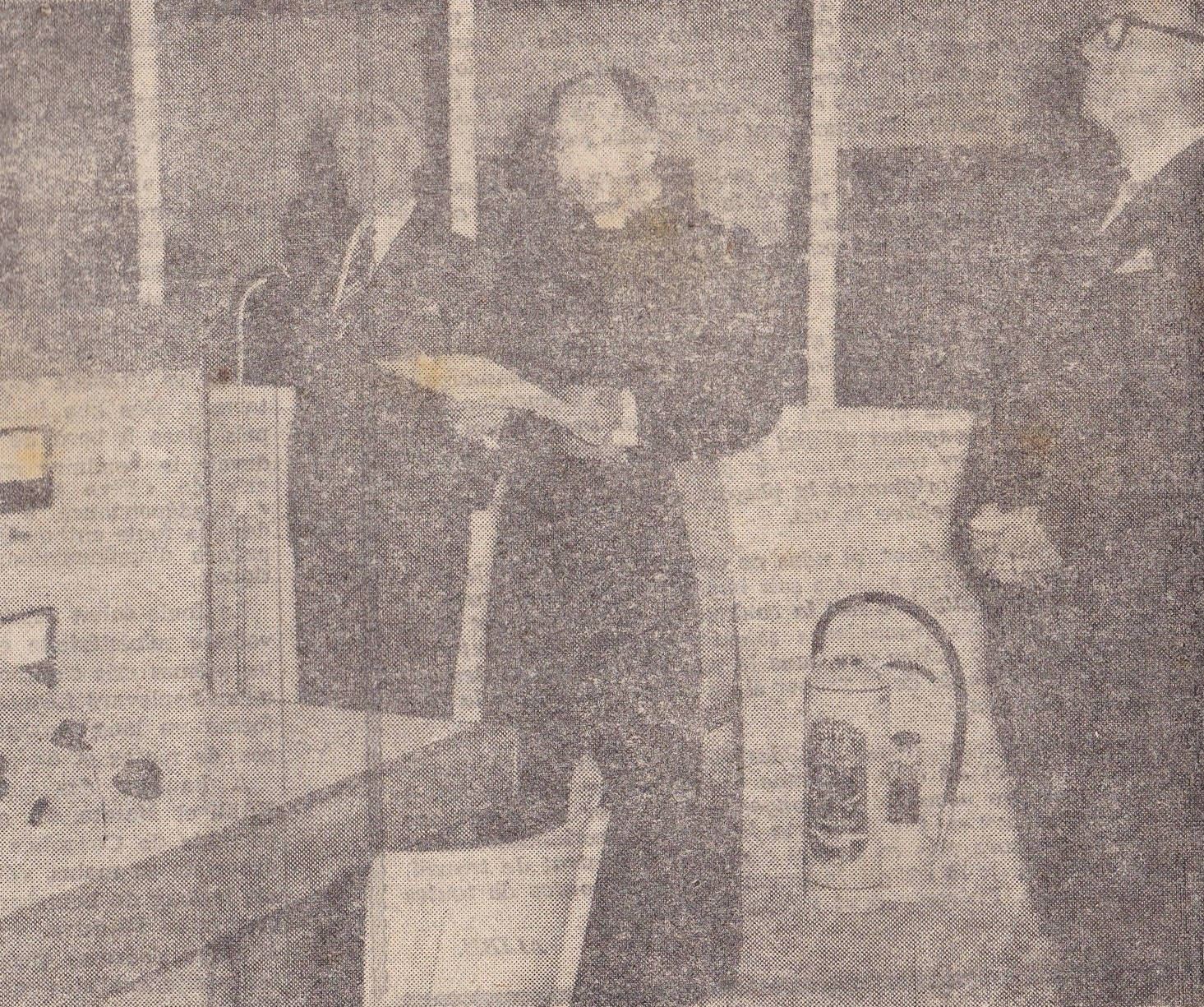
Ceremony commemorating the activation of the first Congolese nuclear reactor with Lovanium University rector Luc Gillon, Governor-General of the Congo Hendrik Cornelis, and Minister of Colonies Maurice van Hemelrijck

Gillon played a significant role in the construction of the first nuclear reactor in Africa, located on the Lovanium campus. He launched the idea of establishing a nuclear research reactor at the university. In 1958, the government of Belgian Congo, with the approval of the Belgian minister of Congo and Ruanda-Urundi, bought a TRIGA MARK I reactor from General Atomics. The Trico I reactor became critical on 6 June 1959 and was shut down on 29 June 1970. He published several books on nuclear energy.
