= Angela Okolo =

Nigerian physician

- Education: Lovanium University
- Occupations: Pediatric Doctor and Academician
- Employer(s): Federal Medical Centre, Asaba, Delta state
- Voice Note

Angela Okolo was a Nigerian professor of pediatrics and child health, neonatologist in the department of Pediatrics, Federal Medical Center, Asaba and President of the Nigerian Society of Neonatal Medicine (NISONM).

She died in the early hours of Sunday 25 January 2026, as announced by the department of paediatrics of the Federal Medical Centre, Asaba.

== Early life and education ==
She hails from Delta State in Nigeria. She started her educational journey at St. Theresa's Primary Catholic School Jos, and then proceeded to St. Louis College Kano for her secondary education. She later went on to study Medicine at Lovanium University, Kinshasa, DRC Central Africa from 1965 to 1971 where she also obtained the basic degree of ‘’Docteur en Medicine’’. Shortly after she started her postgraduate medical training as a resident doctor in child health at the University of Benin Teaching Hospital Edo state, Nigeria between 1972 and 1977. During this course of study, she obtained a membership of the Royal College of Physician and Surgeons of Glasgow in 1977 and then became a fellow of the Royal College of Physicians and Surgeons of Glasgow in 1987 and a fellow of the Royal College of Pediatrics and Child Health (UK) in 1997. She was later appointed as a lecturer at the University of Benin where she later became a professor (1977 to 2016).

== Career ==
She is a consultant pediatrician and professor of pediatrics who majored in Neonatology under the University of Benin Teaching Hospital (1972-till date). In this institution, she indulges in both teaching and researching on neonatology and perinatal health. She lectures at various institutes one of which is Delta State University.

She is also a Neonatologist at the Federal Medical Center Asaba. She has worked with various organizations such as WHO, UNICEF, and ECOWAS under the West African Health Organization to improve child health. She engages in various projects and has made several publications.

== Personal life ==
Okolo is married with two children. She is a native speaker of English, also fluent in Ibo, Hausa, Yoruba, and French. She is a Christian of the Catholic faith, a member of the Catholic Women Organizational and Lady of the Knights of Saint Mulumba(LSM).

== Membership of organization ==
- Sickle cell society of Nigeria (SCSN)
- American Academy of Pediatrics (AAP)
- European society for pediatric endocrinology (ESPE)
- Nigerian society of neonatal medicine(NISOMN)
- Union of National African pediatric societies and association (UNAPSA)
- International pediatric association (IPA)

== Researches and publications ==
- The management of severe tetanus using magnesium sulfate- the experience ina tertiary health institution in Southern Nigeria.
- Postnatal Magnesium Sulfate in Asphyxiated Newborns in Benin City Nigeria: Effect on Mortality
