= Aloïs Kabangi =

Politician

- Prime Minister: Patrice Lumumba; Joseph Iléo

Minister of Economic Coordination and Planning of the Republic of the Congo
- In office 24 June 1960 – September 1960
- In office 9 February 1961 – July 1962

Personal details
- Born: 1 August 1922 Lusambo, Belgian Congo
- Died: 27 April 2014 (aged 91) Kinshasa, Democratic Republic of the Congo
- Party: Mouvement pour l'Unité Basonge

Aloïs Kabangi Kaumbu (1 August 1922 – 27 April 2014) was a Congolese politician. He served as Minister of Economic Coordination and Planning of the Republic of the Congo from June to September 1960 and again from February 1961 to July 1962.

== Biography ==
Aloïs Kabangi was born on 1 August 1922 in Lusambo, Belgian Congo. He received a Catholic education at the Ecole Moyenne Officielle de Lusambo, studying there for four years. He subsequently became a clerk in the colonial administration. In 1945 he served as a member of the Cercle d'Agrément Prince Léopold III de Lusambo. He was a member of the founding committee of the short-lived Union des Populations rurales et extra rurales du Congo. In 1959 he was made attache to the cabinet of the Governor of Kasai Province. In March 1960 the Mouvement pour l'Unité Basonge (MUB) was founded in Kabinda and he became its president. Worried about worsening tribal conflict in Luluabourg, he and other leaders of the MUB formed a cartel with Patrice Lumumba's Mouvement National Congolais (MNC) on the guarantee that the latter would support the creation of Province of Basonge.

"Aloïs Kabangi...impressed me as being an intellectual, self-made, who was able to express himself clearly and thoughtfully, and with definite ideas about his work. He showed method in discussion, and I valued him greatly for so obviously knowing what he was doing."

— Thomas Kanza's reflection on Kabangi

In the general elections of May 1960 Kabangi was elected to the Chamber of Deputies on a Cartel MUB/MNC-Lumumba ticket in the Kabinda constituency, winning with 12,480 preferential votes. He was appointed by Prime Minister Lumumba to serve as Minister of Economic Coordination and Planning in his government of the newly independent Republic of the Congo. The government was officially invested by Parliament on 24 June 1960. The handover in the Ministry of Economic Coordination and Planning under Kabangi's leadership was relatively smooth, and the department busied itself with organising the distribution of foreign food aid to the interior of the Congo. As Lumumba became increasingly radical, Kabangi, a more moderate politician, grew distant from him. In September Lumumba was dismissed and replaced with Joseph Iléo. Iléo retained Kabangi as Minister of Economic Coordination and Planning, but he refused to accept the position. Iléo appointed him to the same post on 9 February 1961 in his second government. In July 1962 Prime Minister Cyrille Adoula appointed him Minister of the Civil Service. On 17 April 1963 Adoula appointed him Minister of Public Administration.

After the creation of the Province of Lomani, Kabangi served as its de facto indirect ruler. He used his position in the central government to ensure that the territory received improved transportation infrastructure and was appropriated needed funds. Kabangi also instructed the special commissioners tasked with keeping order in the province to keep the civil service under the control of the provincial secretary, ensuring continuity and stability in the local administration. In 1964 Kabangi brought the MUB into the Comité Démocratique Africain, a national political coalition. He was later made a member of the political bureau of the Mouvement Populaire de la Révolution (MPR). In December 1970 the bureau was reorganised and he was dismissed from his position.

Kabangi was awarded a gold medal of civic merit in January 2012. He died on 27 April 2014 at the Ngaliema clinic in Kinshasa while awaiting a flight to South Africa for medical care. A funeral was held on 20 May.

== See also ==
- Benoît Verhaegen - Belgian Africanist who served as Kabangi's chef de cabinet after independence
