= José Gotovitch =

Belgian historian (1940–2024)

- Born: 12 April 1940; Brussels, Belgium
- Died: 17 February 2024 (aged 83)
- Occupation: Historian

Academic background
- Education: Free University of Brussels
- Thesis: Le Parti Communiste de Belgique, 1939-1944 : stratégie nationale et pratique locale : la Fédération bruxelloise
- Doctoral advisor: Jean Stengers

Academic work
- Discipline: Contemporary History
- Institutions: CEGESOMA, Free University of Brussels
- Main interests: Belgium and World War II, Belgian communism
- Notable works: L'An 40 (1971) and Du rouge au tricolore (1992)

José Gotovitch (12 April 1940 – 17 February 2024) was a Belgian historian who specialised on the political and social history of Belgium during World War II as well as the history of Communism. He is best-known for the bestselling book L'An 40 (1971), which was co-written with Jules Gérard-Libois and is considered a landmark study in Belgian historiography.

== Background ==
Gotovitch was born into a Jewish family in the working-class Marolles area of Brussels on 12 April 1940 only weeks before Belgium was invaded and occupied in World War II. His parents ran a small stockings and socks shop on the rue des Tanneurs.

Amid the Holocaust in Belgium, he narrowly escaped from a large-scale round-up of Jews in the Marolles on 3 September 1942. 718 people were arrested and deported to Auschwitz concentration camp. Gotovitch ultimately survived the Holocaust as a hidden child (enfant caché) in the rural Province of Namur.

== Education and political activities ==
After the war, Gotovitch studied at the Athénée Léon Lepage and later the Free University of Brussels (Université Libre de Bruxelles, ULB). He earned a licentiate degree in history in 1961, with a thesis on newspapers in German-occupied Belgium in World War I (Contribution à l'histoire de la presse censurée, 1914–1918) under the supervision of Guillaume Jacquemyns, one of the few historians at the university who was not a Medievalist. Gotovitch did not finalise his doctorate (Le Parti Communiste de Belgique, 1939-1944 : stratégie nationale et pratique locale : la Fédération bruxelloise) until 1988.

By the age of 12, he had embraced far-left politics, initially in Left Zionism and, from the age of 18, in the Communist Party of Belgium. Gotovitch was an active communist activist. Shortly before attending ULB, he participated in the communist-run World Festival of Youth and Students in Moscow in 1957. As a student, in 1960, he travelled to Cuba where he met Fidel Castro and Che Guevara. He was actively involved in student communist groups and at the end of his studies co-founded the National Union of Communist Students (Union Nationale des Étudiants Communistes, UNEC) of which he remained national secretary until 1962.

== Academic career ==
After compulsory military service, Gotovitch was recruited by the ULB historian Jacques Willequet as a researcher on a small project researching the history of World War II. Gotovitch's linguistic abilities and mastery of French, Dutch, and particularly German was a major asset to the project.

As there had been little or no serious academic work on the subject before, Gotovitch played an active role in gathering documentation abroad and creating a research infrastructure including the peer-review journal Cahiers d'histoire de la Deuxième Guerre mondiale in 1967 whose role in Belgian historiography has been described as "a pioneering work on any front".

=== L'An 40 ===
Gotovitch collaborated with the Christian Democrat Jules Gérard-Libois on a study on the German invasion of Belgium and the impact of the German occupation on politics and society in Belgium. At the time, the conflict had attracted little or no academic examination in Belgium. L'An 40: La Belgique Occupée (lit. 'Year 40: Belgium Occupied') was published by the Centre de Recherches et d'Informations socio-politiques (CRISP) in 1971. It has been described as a "surprise bestseller".

The book emphasised continuity, claiming that "nothing becomes comprehensible starting from 10 May 1940", the day of the German invasion. The writers emphasised pre-war debates on neutrality after 1936 and the prevalence of authoritarian political ideas on different parts of Belgian society, especially traditional elites.

In a retrospective on the book in 2005, historian Chantal Kesterloot has written that "L'An 40 constituted a formidable source of inspiration for later works, for a generation of researchers which, in its strides, has been interested in the history of this period which remains, more than 60 years after the facts, one of the most stimulating."

The work attracted widespread interest in Belgium. The first edition of 3,000 copies was sold out within three days. It ultimately sold 25,000 copies making it "the uncontested bestseller in Belgian history-writing". Kesterloot emphasises the importance of Gotovitch and Gérard-Libois's work in the growing respectability of the entire field of contemporary history in Belgium during the 1960s and 1970s alongside other writers such as Albert De Jonghe and Luc Schepens. Gotovitch's critical account of the response of Belgian communists to the invasion led to his marginalisation by the party for several years.

=== Later works ===
Gotovitch's scholarship remained largely focused on World War II. He wrote on collaboration, the Exodus, the Holocaust, and the resistance. His thesis was published in 1992 as Du rouge au tricolore: Les communistes belges de 1939 à 1944 : un aspect de l'histoire de la Résistance en Belgique (lit. 'From the Red to the Tricolour: Belgian Communists from 1939 to 1944: An Aspect of the History of the Resistance in Belgium').

After several years outside academia, Gotovitch was recruited as a researcher at the Centre for Research and Historical Study of the Second World War (Centre de recherches et d'études historiques de la Seconde Guerre mondiale, CREHSGM; Navorsings- en Studiecentrum van de Geschiedenis van de Tweede Wereldoorlog, NSGWO) in 1967 which became the Study and Documentation Centre for War and Contemporary Society (Centre d'Études et de Documentation Guerre et Sociétés contemporaines; Studie- en Documentatiecentrum Oorlog en Hedendaagse Maatschappij, both CEGESOMA) in 1997. Gotovitch was its director from 1988 until his retirement in 2005. In this role, he played an important role in building CEGESOMA's large archival collections on the Second World War. He was also research director of the Centre for Communist Archives in Belgium (Centre des archives communistes en Belgique, CArCoB). He was administrator of CRISP from 1987 to 2014.

Gotovitch spent much of his career at ULB where he was the founder of the Centre for History and Sociology of the Left (Centre d'Histoire et de Sociologie des Gauches) with the collaboration of Anne Morelli. Gotovitch was a member of the Royal Academy of Science, Letters and Fine Arts of Belgium. He was invited professor at the Paris Nanterre University in 1990 and French Instituts d'études politiques in 1996. Gotovitch was a prominent public historian in Belgium and worked on television and radio history series including the landmark radio series Jours de Guerre broadcast from 1990 to 1995.

After retiring in 2005, Gotovitch died on 17 February 2024, at the age of 83.
