= Simon Mbatshi Batshia =

Congolese politician

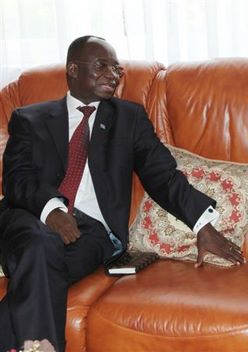
Simon Mbatshi Batshia

Simon Mbatshi Batshia (born 24 May 1949) is a politician from the Democratic Republic of the Congo. He was the Governor of Bas-Congo province from February 2007 to March 2012, when he was elected as a deputy to the National Assembly. Batshia is also a consultant in conflict resolution at the Centre for Conflict Resolution, based in Cape Town, South Africa, and is a member of the South African Institute for International Affairs.

In 2007, Batshia ordered the opening of the border between the Democratic Republic of the Congo and the neighboring Republic of the Congo at Luozi, which had been closed for ten years, to increase trade among people living near the border.

== Education ==
Batshia attended the Mvuangu primary school from 1956 to 1962. From 1962 to 1966 he was enrolled at the minor seminary of Mbata Kiela, before attending the College St Eloi of Luozi from 1966 to 1968. After obtaining his Greco-Latin state diploma, he studied at Lovanium University of Kinshasa (1968–1972) from which he graduated with a degree in commercial and consular sciences.

== Professional career and politics ==
After graduating from Lovanium University (now University of Kinshasa) in 1972, Batshia became a professor at the Interdisciplinary Center for Development and Permanent Education and a managing director at SOGEM (Societe de Gestion et de Management / Administration and Management Company). In 1977 he was elected as a people's commissar, a member of Congo's then-parliament, a position he held until 1982. He joined the administration of Leon Kengo wa Dondo in 1982 as State Secretary of National Economy and Industry, and later Minister of Labor and Social Planning.

After leaving government, Batshia became President and CEO of two state-owned companies. From 1988 to 1991 he led the Societe Nationale des Chemins de Fer du Zaire (now known as SNCC - National Rail Company). He then assumed the same role for the Office de Gestion du Fret Maritime (OGEFREM - Naval Trade Management Company) from 1991 to 1992. After 1992 he left state-owned industry to manage private companies in the wine, spirits, and seafood distribution industries, leading companies including Aspen-Congo, African Fish Trading or Afiltra, and Phoenix International.

=== 2007 election ===
In 2006, Batshia returned to politics, competing in the gubernatorial race in Bas-Congo province as a member of Joseph Kabila's ruling party. Batshia was elected governor of Bas-Congo in January 2007 in an election marked by allegations of corruption and violent conflict between government armed forces and opposition activists of the Bundu Dia Kongo group. Human Rights Watch reported that, despite the opposition coalition led by Jean-Pierre Bemba successfully claiming a majority in the Bas-Congo provincial assembly, opposition candidates narrowly lost their contests when the provincial assembly voted to elect the governor and vice-governor. The conflict over the election and results took the lives of more than 100 civilians. Reports by non-governmental organizations, such as Human Rights Watch, implicated senior provincial police and military officials but did not allege that Batshia played a role in the violence.

An appeals court in Bas-Congo threw out the election results based on allegations of vote-buying in the provincial assembly. Ultimately, the Court of Cassation overturned the Appeals Court, upholding the election results in a ruling on February 20, 2007. The unsuccessful legal challenge was filed by Leonard Fuku Unzola of the Movement for Liberation of Congo, who had been the chief opposition candidate for the office of Bas-Congo governor. Violent clashes between members of Bundu Dia Kongo and the provincial police and national military continued through 2008.

=== Governor of Bas-Congo ===
Batshia's governorship was characterized by the battle for the decentralized distribution of 40% of provincial income from the central government. His term was marked by the creation of a provincial fiscal office (REPERE – Régie Provinciale d’Encadrement des Recettes) as well as the establishment of the COPIDE (Commission pour la Promotion des Investissements et du Développement du Bas-Congo - Commission of Investments and Development Promotion in Bas-Congo) and the CLCFT (Commission de Lutte contre la Corruption, la Fraude et les Tracasseries administratives - Anti-Corruption, Frauds and Bureaucracy Commission).

=== National Assembly ===
In the general election on November 28, 2011, Batshia was elected National Deputy of the district of Lukula. Choosing to sit in the National Assembly, he vacated the office of Governor of Bas-Congo on March 6, 2012.
