= Montréal-les-Sources =

- Commune
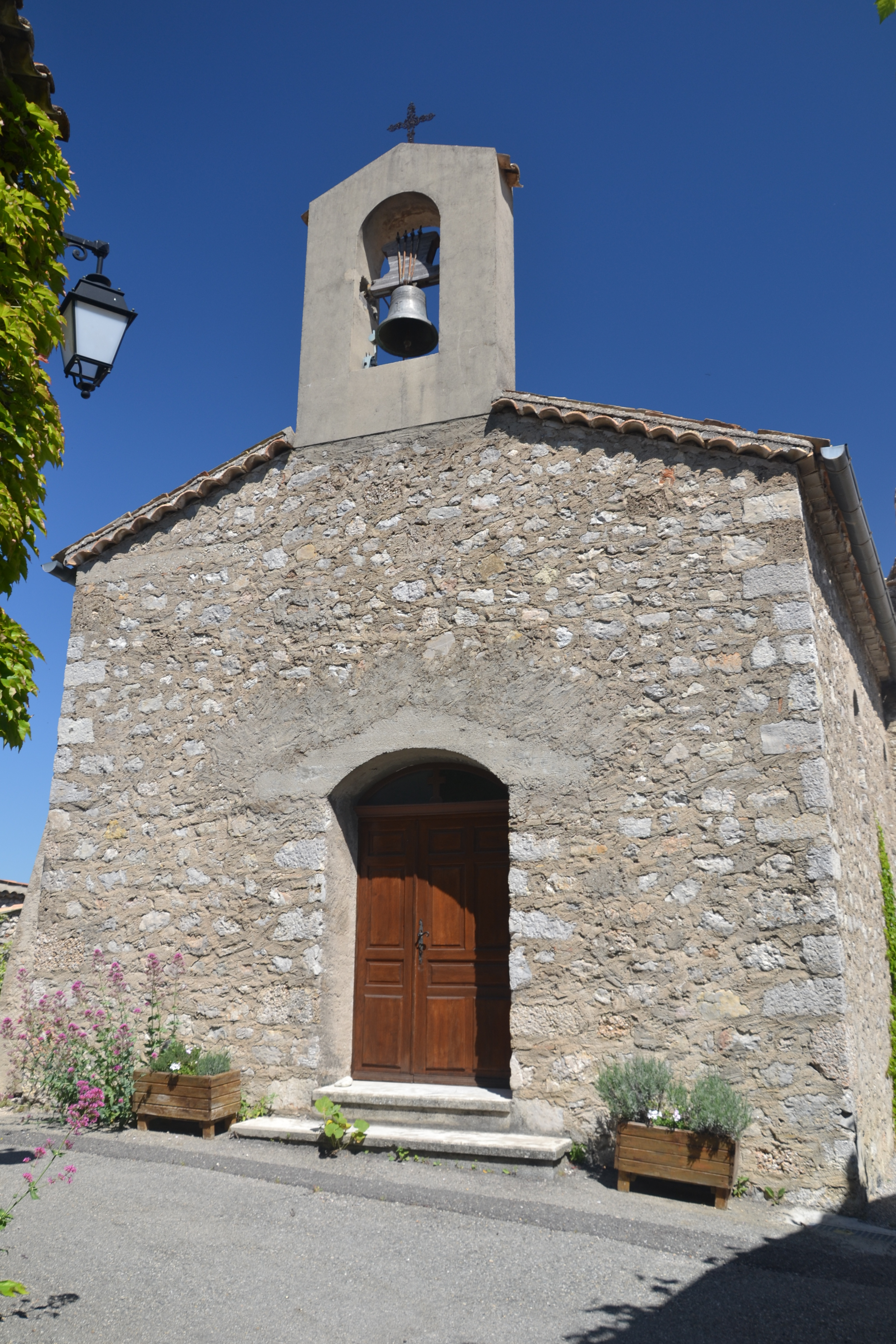
- The church of Montréal-les-Sources
- Location of Montréal-les-Sources
- Location within France Location within Auvergne-Rhône-Alpes
- Coordinates: 44°24′08″N 5°18′03″E
- Country: France
- Region: Auvergne-Rhône-Alpes
- Department: Drôme
- Arrondissement: Nyons
- Canton: Nyons et Baronnies

Government
  - Mayor (2022–2026): Didier Laffitte
- Area^{1}: 10.26 km^{2} (3.96 sq mi)
- Highest elevation: 1,301 m (4,268 ft)
- Lowest elevation: 427 m (1,401 ft)
- Population (2023): 26
  - Density: 2.5/km^{2} (6.6/sq mi)
- Time zone: UTC+01:00 (CET)
  - Summer (DST): UTC+02:00 (CEST)
- INSEE/Postal code: 26209 /26510
- ^{1} French Land Register data, which excludes lakes, ponds, glaciers > 1 km^{2} (0.386 sq mi or 247 acres) and river estuaries.

Montréal-les-Sources (French pronunciation: [mɔ̃ʁe.al le suʁs]) is a commune in the Drôme department in southeastern France.

== Population ==
Historical population
Year	Pop.	±% p.a.
1968	35	—
1975	21	−7.04%
1982	37	+8.43%
1990	33	−1.42%
1999	22	−4.41%
2007	29	+3.51%
2012	30	+0.68%
2017	23	−5.18%
2023	26	+2.06%
Source: INSEE

== See also ==
- Communes of the Drôme department
