= National University of Zaire =

Former university in Zaire (1971–81)

- Université nationale du Zaïre (UNAZA)
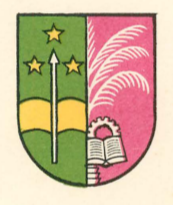
- Former names: National University of Congo (Université nationale du Congo)
- Type: National university (Public)
- Active: 1971–1981
- Campus: Three campuses: Kinshasa (Medicine); Lubumbashi (Social Sciences); Yangambi (Agriculture)

The National University of Zaire (French: Université nationale du Zaïre, or UNAZA) was a federated university in Zaire (the present-day Democratic Republic of the Congo) which existed between 1971 and 1981.

UNAZA was established in August 1971 when the country's three existing universities (Note: The three universities incorporated into UNAZA were Lovanium University in Kinshasa, the Free University of the Congo in Kisangani, and the Official University of the Congo in Lubumbashi.) and 17 technical colleges were merged into a single administrative structure. It was briefly known as the National University of the Congo (Université nationale du Congo, or UNACO) until the Democratic Republic of the Congo became Zaire in October 1971.

The reforms were designed to allow the Congolese dictator, Mobutu Sese Seko, and his governing Popular Movement of the Revolution party greater control over the Congolese university system which had previously been a source of political dissent. (Note: Major unrest at university campuses in 1969 had led to a military crackdown on student dissent and a two-year suspension of university tuition.) The reform also allowed the Zairean state to implement its programme of Authenticité by breaking the ties which had traditionally connected the country's university education to the Catholic and Protestant Churches.

Under the UNAZA, specialised campuses were established for particular disciplines: Faculties of Social Sciences, Agriculture, and Medicine were established at Lubumbashi, Yangambi, and Kinshasa respectively. It received foreign aid from the American Rockefeller Foundation and from the Zairean government.

The UNAZA encountered problems soon after its creation. Much of the promised financial support from the Zairean government never materialised and the university was also subject to political interference. Administrative support and library resources were poor and members of faculty were frequently left unpaid. The poor transport infrastructure in Zaire also made the university's federal structure difficult to sustain.

In 1981, the university split back into its constituent institutions: the University of Kinshasa, the University of Kisangani, and University of Lubumbashi. The UNAZA structure was maintained in a basic administrative form to facilitate cooperation between the different independent universities. A centralised university press, the University Presses of Zaire (Presses universitaires du Zaïre, PUZ), was nonetheless established in Kinshasa in the same year to support publications from the newly independent institutions.

== Notable faculty ==
- Pius Ngandu Nkashama (1946—), Zairean writer and literary critic
- Benoît Verhaegen (1929–2009), Belgian historian and political sociologist
- Jean-Claude Willame (1938—), Belgian historian

== See also ==
- University of East Africa (1963–70)

== Bibliography ==
- Verhaegen, Benoît (1978). L'enseignement universitaire au Zaïre: de Lovanium à l'Unaza, 1958-1978. Paris: L'Harmattan. ISBN 9782858020706.
- Ndaywel è Nziem, Isidore, ed. (2018). Les années UNAZA (Université Nationale du Zaïre) : Contribution à l'histoire de l'Université Africaine. Paris: L'Harmattan. ISBN 978-2-343-12831-3., 2 vols.
