= Jean Kestergat =

Belgian journalist (1922–1992)

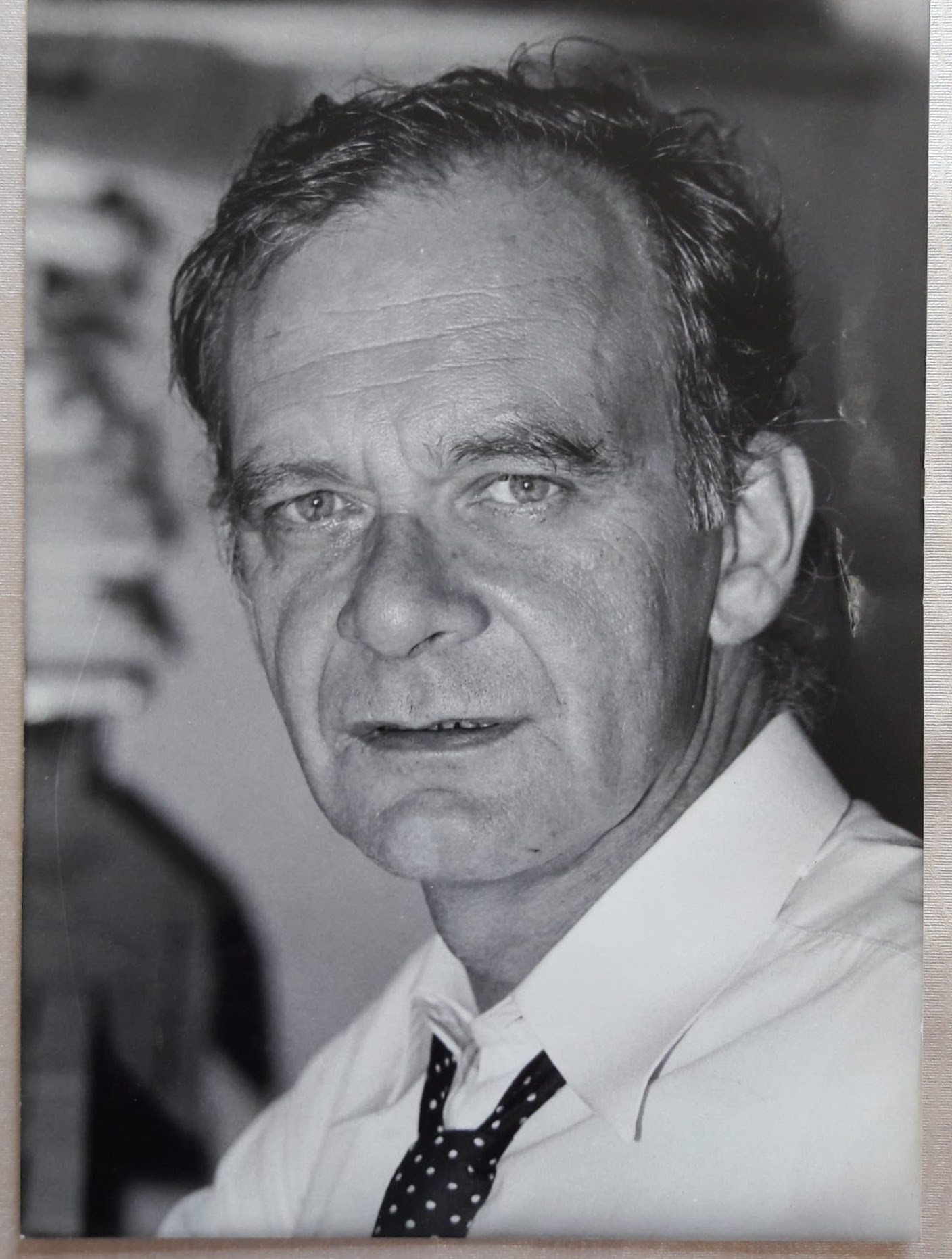
- Jean van der Dussen de Kestergat
- Born: Jean-Marie Thierry Alphonse Ghislain van der Dussen de Kestergat; 8 April 1922; Ottignies, Belgium
- Died: 27 July 1992 (aged 70); Ottignies
- Other name: JK
- Occupation: journalist
- Years active: 1946—1992
- Notable work: Jacques Brassinne; Jean Kestergat (1991). Qui a tué Patrice Lumumba?. Duculot. ISBN 978-2-8011-0979-3.
- Spouse: Jacqueline d'Iweins d'Eeckhoutte

Jean-Marie Thierry Alphonse Ghislain van der Dussen de Kestergat (8 April 1922 – 27 July 1992), better known under his pen name Jean Kestergat or JK was a Belgian journalist.

== Early life ==
Coat of arms of the van der Dussen family

Jean Kestergat was the son of Marcel van der Dussen de Kestergat and Charlotte de Thomaz de Bossière. He was the issue of an ancient Belgian noble family and grew up at the castle of Ottignies. When the Second World War broke out, he fled to the south of France, before returning to Ottignies where he was taken a prisoner to the prison of Saint-Gilles. He studied at the Agronomic institute of Gembloux, before becoming a volunteer at the Royal Navy from 1944 to 1946.

== Journalistic career ==
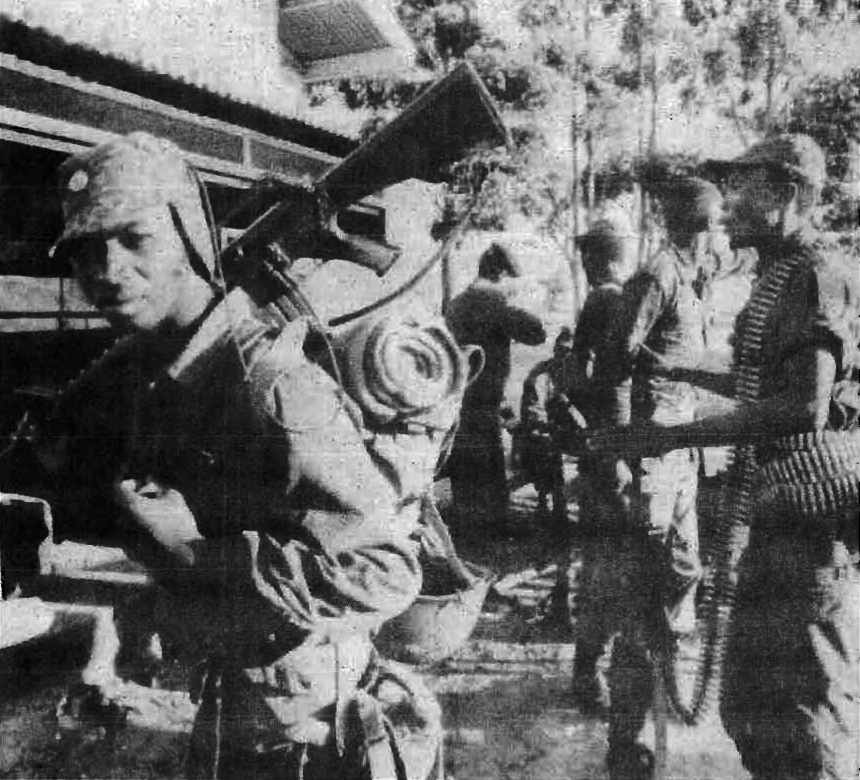
Zairean troops with a Moroccan military adviser during the Shaba I war

Kestergat started his career in journalism as an intern at Le Phare in 1946. On 12 September 1946, he married Jacqueline Iweins d'Eeckhoutte. In 1950, he started to work at La Libre Belgique, where he would stay until his retirement in 1987. Initially, Kestergat reported on domestic Belgian matters, until he undertook his first foreign mission in 1957. The next year, he reported on the Belgian Congo for the first time, which would become his main subject for the rest of his career. In that context, he reported on the Shaba I and Shaba II wars in 1977 and 1978, as well as bilateral Belgo-Congolese (or Belgo-Zairean) relations under President Mobutu Sese Seko.

Jean Kestergat was the author of several novels, a biography of André Ryckmans, as well as several works of journalism and contemporary history, namely on the politics of the Democratic Republic of the Congo. Together with Jacques Brassinne de La Buissière, who wrote his doctoral dissertation on the murder of the first Congolese Prime Minister Patrice Lumumba, he wrote Qui a tué Patrice Lumumba? ("Who killed Patrice Lumumba?").

== Publications ==
- Jacques Brassinne; Jean Kestergat (1991). Qui a tué Patrice Lumumba?. Duculot. ISBN 978-2-8011-0979-3.
- Jean Kestergat (1978). 25 miljoen Zuidafrikanen: het drama van de apartheid. Standaard. ISBN 978-90-02-13939-0.
- Jean Kestergat. André Ryckmans: présenté par Jean Kestergat ... Préface de Jean Ladrière. [Choix de lettres et notes politiques de André Ryckmans.]. Éditions du Centurion.
- Jean Kestergat (1965). Congo Congo: De l'indépendance à la guerre civile. La Table Ronde. ISBN 978-2-7103-9898-1.
- Jean Kestergat (1965). La Promenade africaine. Berger-Levrault (impr. Berger-Levrault).
- Jean Kestergat (1957). Petitbiquet. Julliard. ISBN 978-2-260-03333-2.
- Jean Kestergat (1985). Quand le Zaïre s'appelait Congo: l'aventure coloniale belge. P. Legrain. ISBN 978-2-87057-010-4.
