= Badji Mokhtar Annaba University =

Algerian university

Badji Mokhtar - Annaba University
- جامعة باجي مختار–عنابة
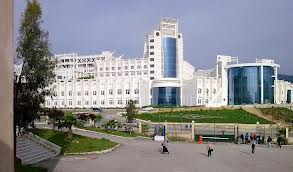
- Former name: Annaba University
- Type: Public
- Established: 1975
- Rector: Prof. Mohamed Manaa
- Academic staff: 2500
- Administrative staff: 1905
- Students: 43,406
- Undergraduates: 39,500
- Postgraduates: 3906
- Location: Annaba, Algeria; 36.91443969°N 7.7426673°E
- Website: www.univ-annaba.dz
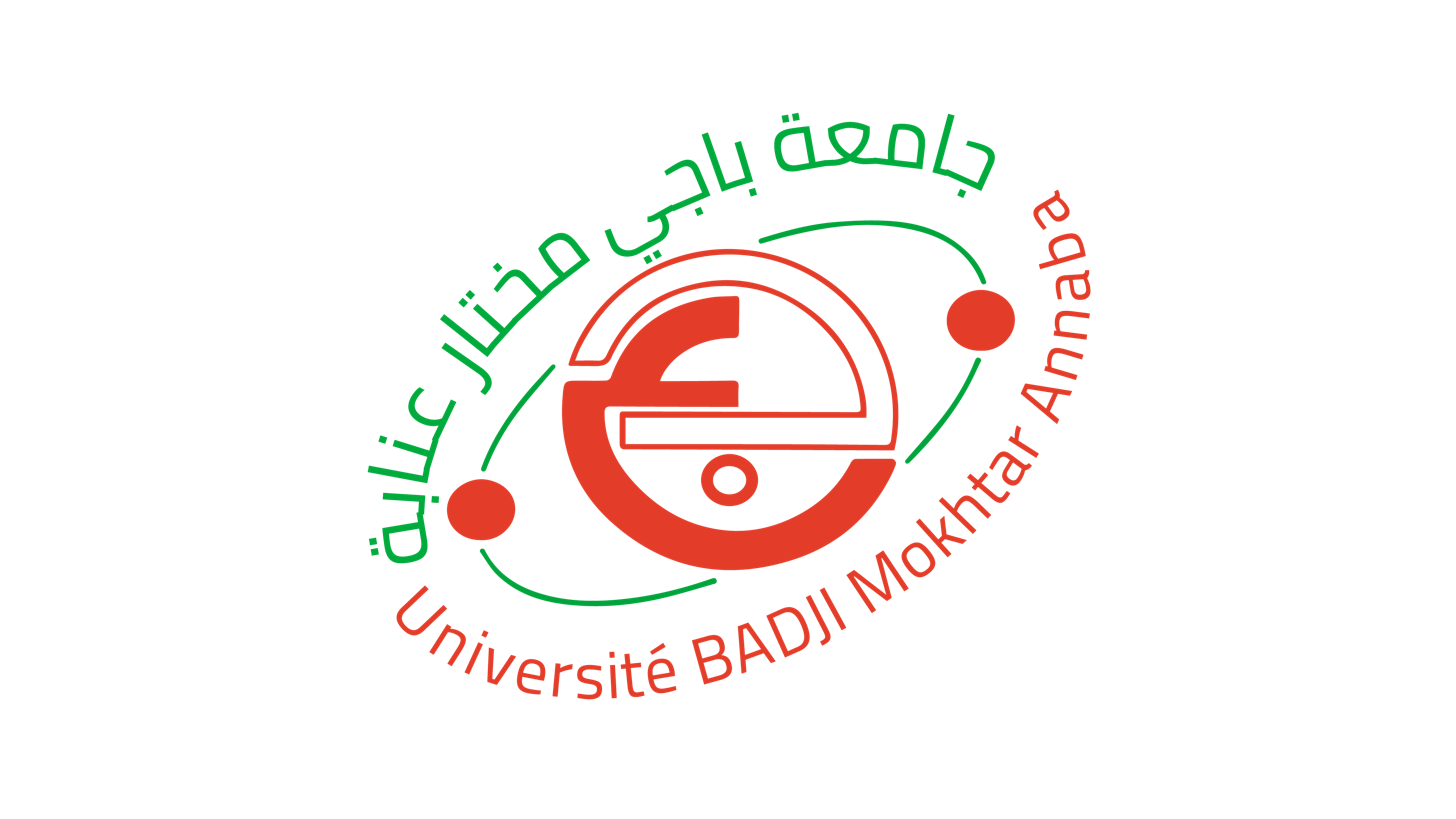

- Location within Algeria

Badji Mokhtar University – Annaba (UBMA) (Arabic: جامعة باجي مختار-عنابة) is one of the largest universities in Algeria, located in Annaba, on the northeastern coast of Algeria. It is named after the chahid Badji Mokhtar, an Algerian political activist and independence fighter, one of the 22 historical leaders responsible for launching the Algerian War of Independence.

== History ==
Created by Ordinance 28/75 on April 29, 1975 from the infrastructure of the former Institute of Mines and Metallurgy of Annaba, the University of Annaba has progressively developed with the opening of new fields of study every year. Initially structured into departments attached to the Rectorate, the university saw in 1980 the creation of five institutes (Social sciences, Arabic language and literature, Natural sciences, Exact sciences and technology, and Medical sciences) ·

By 1993, it operated with 20 institutes grouped into three main areas:

- Fundamental sciences
- Technological sciences
- Human and social sciences

Formerly offering multidisciplinary training leading to D.E.S., Licence, Engineer, and Higher Technician (DEUA), the University of Annaba was among the pioneers in adopting the new LMD system (Licence–Master–Doctorate). Although primarily technology-oriented, it has maintained a strong tradition in the humanities since its founding. These characteristics make it a privileged site for interdisciplinarity and interaction with its social and industrial environment.

== Campuses and organization ==
Since 1999, the university has been restructured into seven faculties grouping 39 departments.

Currently, the structures of the University of Annaba are distributed across four university campuses

Sidi Amar University Campus:

- Rectorate
- Faculty of Sciences
- Faculty of Engineering Sciences
- Faculty of Earth Sciences

Ahmed El Bouni University Campus:

- Faculty of Law
- Faculty of Medicine
- Faculty of Letters, Human and Social Sciences

Sidi Achour University Campus:

- Faculty of Economic Sciences and Management Sciences

Annaba City Center Campus (Ex. INESM):

- Faculty of Medicine

== Student body ==
During the 2019–2020 academic year, the Badji Mokhtar University – Annaba enrolled 43,406 students distributed as follows:

- Licence: 28,600
- Master: 10,900
- Doctorate: 3,906

The university had 747 international students from 32 nationalities and 88 students studying abroad, including 62 Top graduates, 24 PNE scholarships, and 2 ProfasB+ scholarships. It also hosts 13 active student associations and 27 scientific clubs.

The teaching staff during the 2019–2020 academic year was distributed as follows:

Grade	Number
Professors	584
Senior Lecturers A	404
Senior Lecturers B	555
Assistant Professors A	771
Assistant Professors B	115
Assistants	08 (Master's degree not yet defended)
Teaching assistants	02 (First-year Master's)
Part-time / Associate lecturers	465

UBMA also employs 1,905 administrative and technical staff (ATS).

== Teaching ==
Teaching is provided through seven faculties and 39 departments, offering:

- Nine common core programs
- 199 Bachelor and Master programs across all fields of knowledge
- 127 Doctoral programs
- One Research center in Environmental studies
- One Distance learning center
- One Language learning center for intensive language training
- A University Publications Directorate
- 14 student dormitories across the city, offering over 38,000 beds
- Two central Libraries and seven faculty Libraries with specialized research collections currently undergoing digital conversion

== Research ==
UBMA hosts 172 ongoing research projects and over 89 research laboratories, ranking it among the largest research universities in Algeria.

== Ranking ==
According to the latest University Ranking by Academic Performance 2019–2020, Badji Mokhtar University – Annaba ranked 2nd in Algeria for scientific production and 1688th worldwide. ·

== International relations ==
=== International partnerships ===
UBMA has more than 27 partnership agreements with universities around the world · · · :

- University of Porto
- Babeș-Bolyai University
- University of Nantes
- University of Haute-Alsace
- Université du Littoral Côte d'Opale
- University of Angers
- Joseph Fourier University
- University of Valenciennes and Hainaut-Cambrésis
- University of Rouen-Normandy
- Istanbul University
- University of Salento
- University of Genoa
- Université du Québec en Abitibi-Témiscamingue
- University of Jendouba
- University of Monastir
- University of Sfax
- Cheikh Anta Diop University
- University of Mahajanga
- Ministry of Education and Training of the Kingdom of Lesotho
- Cooperation between the Algerian MESRS and the Tunisian Ministry of Higher Education
- University of Milan-Bicocca
- Aristotle University of Thessaloniki
- Ural State Mining University
- Cracow University of Technology
- University of Girona
- University of Caen-Normandy
- Biological Station of La Tour du Valat
- Aix-Marseille School of Journalism and Communication

== Bibliography ==
- Hachi, Slimane and Aïssani, Djamil (2008). "Béjaïa, centre de transmission du savoir", C.N.R.P.A.H., ISBN 978-9961-716-23-6.
- Tas, Idir (2022). Petite sœur, Les éditions du Net, ISBN 978-2312119359.
