= Charles Onana =

French-Cameroonian political scientist and writer (born 1964)

Charles Auguste Onana
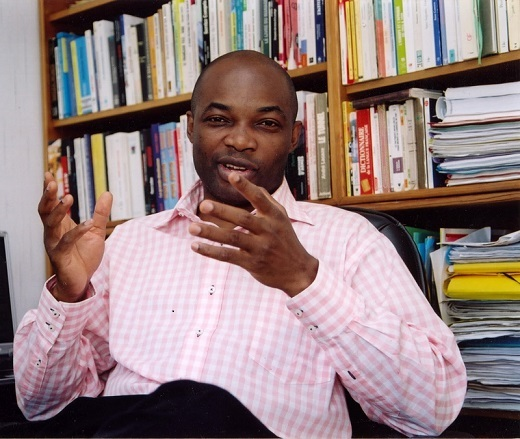
- Onana in 2018
- Born: 18 February 1964 (age 62)
- Education: Sorbonne University; Jean Moulin University Lyon 3 (Ph.D., 2017)
- Occupations: Investigative journalist; political scientist; essayist; author; publisher
- Criminal charges: Genocide denial

Charles Auguste Onana (born 18 February 1964) is a French-Cameroonian political scientist, investigative journalist, essayist, and publisher. In December 2024, he was convicted of genocide denial.

== Education ==
A graduate of Sorbonne University, Onana obtained a Ph.D. in political science in 2017 from Jean Moulin University Lyon 3, with a doctoral thesis entitled Rwanda : l'opération Turquoise et la controverse médiatique (1994–2014) (trans: "Rwanda: Opération Turquoise and the Media Controversy (1994–2014).

== Rwandan genocide ==
Since 2002, Onana has published several books about the African Great Lakes region and the tragedies that have affected the four nations that border it: Burundi, the Democratic Republic of the Congo, Uganda, and Rwanda, with particular emphasis on the 1994 Rwandan genocide.

Onana has questioned the use of the term "genocide" in reference to the events that took place in Rwanda, and he has accused Paul Kagame of orchestrating the massacre of Tutsis and Hutus as well as the 6 April 1994 downing of the aircraft carrying Rwandan president Juvénal Habyarimana and Burundian president Cyprien Ntaryamira, a theory he details in his 2002 book Les Secrets du génocide rwandais : enquête sur les mystères d'un président (trans: "secrets of the Rwandan genocide: investigating the mysteries of a president"). According to political scientist René Lemarchand, the book reveals few secrets and contains many biases.

In 2004, journalist Christophe Ayad published an article in the French daily Libération, in which he called Onana and the French-Canadian journalist Robin Philpot, who were invited to participate in an international conference on Rwanda at Sorbonne University, "denialists". The authors subsequently filed a defamation suit against Libération.

In 2005, Onana led a conference entitled "Silence on an attack: the scandal of the Rwandan genocide". He proceeded to investigate the International Criminal Tribunal for Rwanda and published a book on the topic the same year, containing information he supposedly obtained from the international jurist Carla Del Ponte.

Onana's 2009 essay "Ces tueurs tutsi au cœur de la tragédie congolaise" (trans. "These Tutsi killers at the heart of the Congolese tragedy") was cited by French historian of genocide Hélène Dumas in an article in which she notes Onana's racist accusations about Tutsi women and his validation of a supposed "plan for the conquest of the Great Lakes of Africa", a false narrative circulating since 1962.

In 2019, Onana published the book Rwanda, la vérité sur l'opération Turquoise (trans. "Rwanda, the truth about Operation Turquoise), in which he declared that "the conspiracy theory of a Hutu regime planning a 'genocide' in Rwanda constitutes one of the biggest scams of the 20th century". In an article for the Fondation Jean-Jaurès think tank, academic Serge Dupuis calls the book an "investigation conducted exclusively to exonerate", very poorly supported by sources, and whose objective is "the pillorying of the RPF" (Rwandan Patriotic Front).

At an international conference held at the French Senate on 9 March 2020 on "60 years of instability in the Great Lakes region of Africa", Onana denounced the French-led 1994 Opération Turquoise and called out the crimes committed by the RPF during and after the genocide, as well as the inertia of the United Nations following the RPF's refusal of any humanitarian intervention in Rwanda.

=== Legal issues ===
In 2019, the International League Against Racism and Anti-Semitism filed a complaint against Onana for contesting crimes against humanity during a television interview about his book Rwanda, la vérité sur l'opération Turquoise.

Onana was indicted in January 2022, following a complaint filed in 2020 by the non-governmental organizations Survie, International Federation for Human Rights, and Human Rights League for breach of freedom of expression in his denial of crimes against humanity in the book. He was put on trial in October 2024.

The rationale for the trial has been contested by two Nobel Peace Prize laureates, Denis Mukwege and Adolfo Pérez Esquivel.

On 4 October 2024, Onana filed a complaint against the current Rwandan head of state, Paul Kagame, with the Paris public prosecutor, following "public threats" made against him.

On 9 December 2024, Onana and his publishing director, Damien Serieyx, were found guilty by a Paris court of denying and downplaying the Rwandan genocide.

== Other activities ==
Onana is the manager of Éditions Duboiris, the publishing house that has issued most of his books.

He has written on the role and actions of African soldiers during the Second World War, on René Maran, on Josephine Baker and her involvement in counter-espionage on behalf of Charles de Gaulle from 1940, on the involvement of the charitable organization Zoé's Ark in the 2007 kidnapping of 103 minors in Chad (co-written with the Chadian politician Ngarlejy Yorongar), on the downfall of the former Ivorian president Laurent Gbagbo, on the diplomatic relations between France, Israel, and the PLO during the tenure of former French president François Mitterrand, and on Jean-Bédel Bokassa.

None of his books have been translated into English.

== Recognition ==
In 2018, Onana was awarded the Victoire Ingabire Umuhoza Democracy and Peace Prize (together with Canadian radio broadcaster Phil Taylor) by the International Women's Network for Democracy and Peace in Belgium for his work on "the reconciliation of people through dialogue, respect for the human person, and social justice in the African Great Lakes region".

== Publications ==
- Bokassa : ascension et chute d'un empereur (1921–1996) : une enquête qui dévoile la face cachée du pouvoir sous Giscard et Mitterrand, Éditions Duboiris (1998) ISBN 978-2-9513159-0-7
- Les Secrets du génocide rwandais : enquête sur les mystères d'un président with Déo Mushayidi, Duboiris (2002)
- Enquêtes interdites, Duboiris, 2002
- La France et ses tirailleurs. Enquête sur les combattants de la République, Duboiris (2003) ISBN 978-2951315945
- Les secrets de la justice internationale : enquêtes truquées sur le génocide rwandais foreword by Pierre Péan, Duboiris (2005) ISBN 978-2951315983
- Silence sur un attentat, Duboiris (2005)
- L'Édition menacée : livre blanc sur l'édition indépendante (foreword by Gilles Perrault), Duboiris (2006) ISBN 978-2952231565
- Pourquoi la France brûle, la racaille parle, Duboiris (2006) ISBN 978-2952231541
- Joséphine Baker contre Hitler : la star noire de la France, Duboiris (2006) ISBN 978-2952231572
- Noirs Blancs Beurs 1940–1945 : libérateurs de la France (foreword by Richard Bohringer), Duboiris (2006) ISBN 978-2952231510
- Une vie de Lion (with Roger Milla, foreword by Pelé, afterword by Sepp Blatter), Duboiris (2006) ISBN 978-2952231534
- Un racisme français : le communautarisme blanc menace la République (with Frédérique Mouzer and Kofi Yamgnane), Duboiris (2007) ISBN 978-2916872001
- René Maran : le premier Goncourt noir 1887–1960, Duboiris (2007) ISBN 978-2916872018
- Les voyous de l'arche de Zoé : enquête sur un kidnapping d'enfants, Duboiris (2008) ISBN 978-2916872070
- Ces tueurs tutsi au cœur de la tragédie congolaise (foreword by Cynthia McKinney), Duboiris (2009)
- Al-Bashir & Darfour : la contre-enquête, Duboiris (2010) ISBN 978-2916872117
- Côte d'Ivoire : le coup d'État (foreword by Thabo Mbeki), Duboiris (2011) ISBN 978-2916872179
- Europe, Crimes et Censure au Congo, Duboiris (2012)
- France–Côte d'Ivoire : la rupture, Duboiris (2013) ISBN 978-2916872223
- La France dans la terreur rwandaise, Duboiris (2014) ISBN 978-2916872216
- Palestine, le malaise français, Duboiris (2015) ISBN 978-2916872261
- Pourquoi combattre ? (contributor; edited by Pierre-Yves Rougeyron), Éditions Perspectives Libres (2018) ISBN 979-1090742-482
- Rwanda, la vérité sur l'opération Turquoise, L'Artilleur (2019) ISBN 978-2810009176
- Bokassa : vie et dernières confidences, Duboiris (2020)
- Enquêtes sur un attentat – Rwanda 6 avril 1994 (foreword by Adolfo Pérez Esquivel), L'Artilleur (2021) ISBN 978-2810010165
- Holocauste au Congo : l'omerta de la communauté internationale (foreword by Charles Millon), L'Artilleur (2023) ISBN 978-2810011452
