= Lovanium University =

Catholic university that was the first in the Belgian Congo

- Université Lovanium (French)
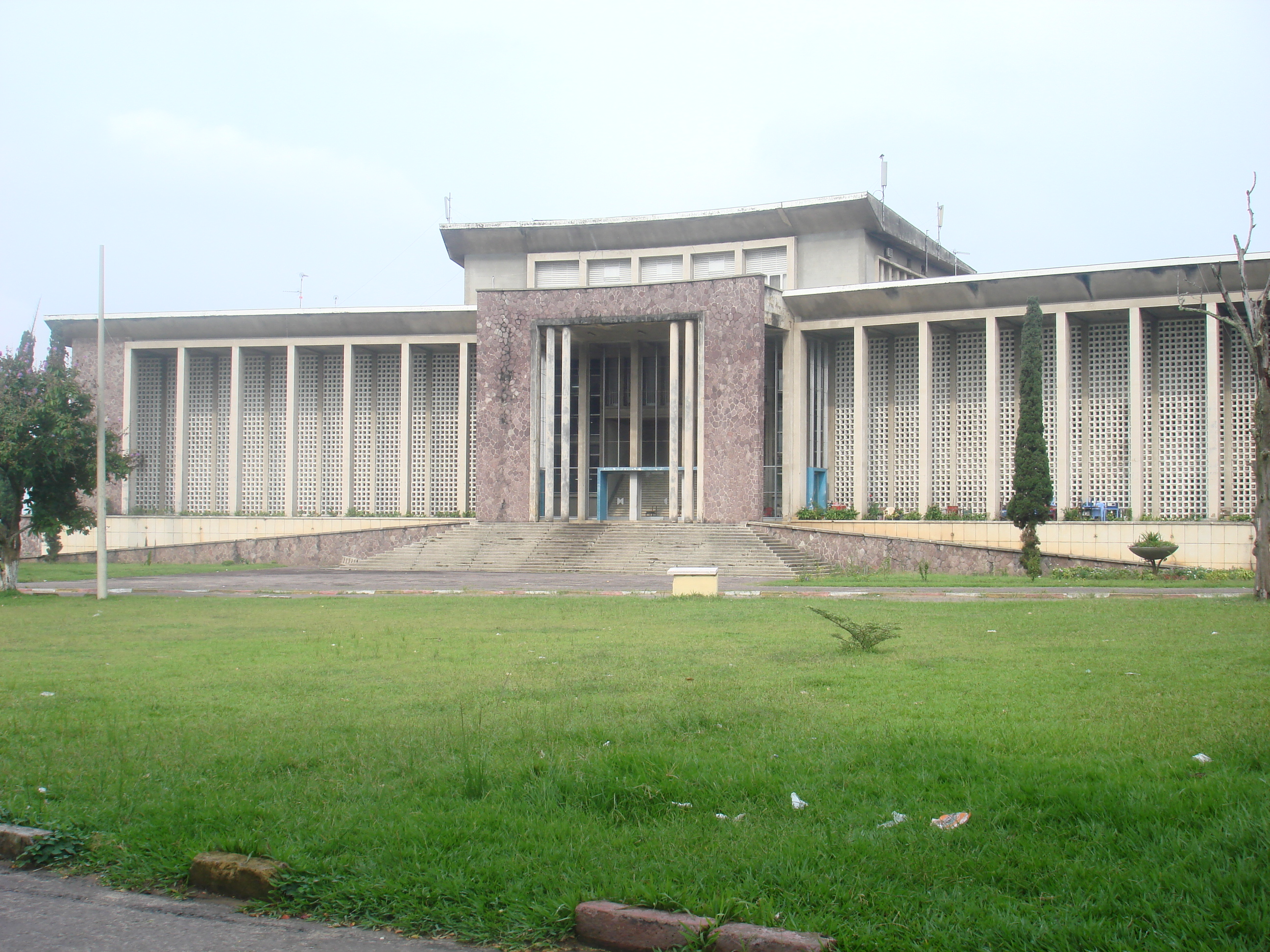
- Buildings of the former Lovanium University in the modern University of Kinshasa
- Type: Catholic university
- Active: 1954–1971
- Location: Kimwenza plateau, Belgian Congo
- Campus: Urban

Lovanium University (French: Université Lovanium) was a Catholic university in Kinshasa in the Belgian Congo. The university was established in 1954 on the Kimwenza plateau, near Kinshasa. The university continued to function after independence until it was merged into the National University of Zaire in 1971. It can be considered an antecedent of the University of Kinshasa.

== Early history ==
Before the foundation of Lovanium, the Catholic University of Louvain already operated multiple institutes for higher education in the Belgian Congo. The Fomulac (Fondation médicale de l'université de Louvain au Congo), was founded in 1926, with the goal of forming Congolese medical personnel and researchers specialized in tropical medicine. In 1932 the Catholic University of Louvain founded the Cadulac (Centres agronomiques de l'université de Louvain au Congo) in Kisantu. Cadulac was specialized in agricultural sciences and formed the basis for what was later to become Lovanium.

== Lovanium ==
The university was established in 1954 on the Kimwenza plateau, near Léopoldville (now Kinshasa). Lovanium was founded by the Catholic University of Leuven in Belgium, from which it derived its name, with Lovanium being the Latinized form of Leuven. The university maintained close ties with its founding university in Belgium through the establishment of the Higher Academic Council, comprising rectors and professors from both institutions, which played a consultative role in shaping Lovanium's academic and administrative policies. Lovanium consisted of several faculties including Agriculture, Engineering, Law, Medicine, Philosophy and Letters, Political, Social and Economic Sciences, Psychology and Pedagogy, Sciences, and Theology. Its early growth was heavily reliant on financial support from various international sources, including substantial subsidies from the colonial government, as well as funding from the Ford Foundation, the Rockefeller Foundation, and the United States Agency for International Development (USAID) and was lauded as the best university in Africa.

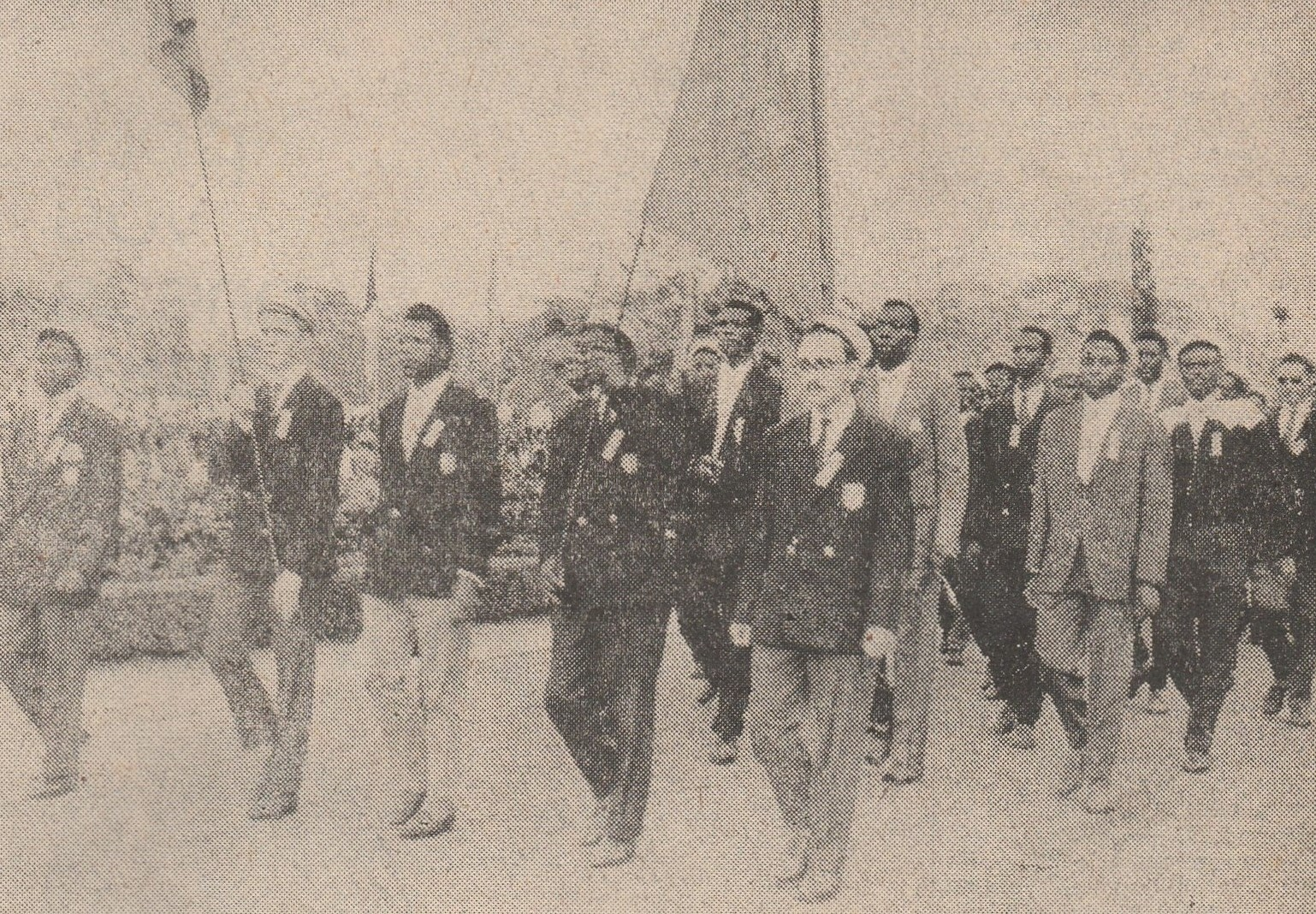
Lovanium University students marching during the Independence Day celebration on 30 June 1960.

Lovanium's student demographic was notably cosmopolitan, with a considerable representation of non-Congolese and non-African students. Despite an initial enrollment of only 33 students in the 1954-55 academic year, Lovanium experienced consistent growth, awarding a total of 228 diplomas and certificates during 1958-63. This included 134 first-degree diplomas for undergraduate programs lasting at least four years, and 94 additional awards encompassing special or postgraduate certificates. Africa's first nuclear reactor, TRIGA I, was established at Lovanium in 1958 in conjunction with the U.S. Atoms for Peace program. In June 1960, just before the country's independence, newly promulgated statutes significantly restructured Lovanium's governance, relocating the administrative council from Brussels to Léopoldville to enhance Congolese participation in the institution's administration. Despite initial challenges, such as a decline in student enrollment post-independence, with total enrollment plummeting from 485 to 413 students due to the exodus of nearly all non-African students, Lovanium's population rebounded, with enrollment rising from 413 in the 1960-61 academic year to 1,087 in 1963-64. Financial support from the Congolese government and USAID facilitated the construction of a three-wing dormitory, which enabled the institution to accommodate a larger student body.

By the 1963-64 academic year, the Congolese student population had increased to 743, alongside 211 non-Congolese Africans and 133 non-African students, with representation from 14 countries, including nine where English was the primary language of instruction. As Lovanium expanded and became more deeply integrated into the Congolese educational framework, the proportion of Congolese students steadily increased, ultimately comprising the majority of the student body. Nonetheless, despite the growing Congolese influence in Lovanium's administration, it stayed predominantly Belgian for several years post-independence. For instance, in the 1961-62 academic year, 83% of the full-time faculty were Belgian, while only 5% were Congolese. This stark disparity in faculty composition engendered tensions between staff and students, exacerbated by divergent political ideologies and cultural dissonances. The student body, many of whom were anti-clerical and pro-Patrice Lumumba, frequently clashed with the predominantly clerical leadership of the institution. By 1963, however, the council's composition had dramatically shifted, with 10 of the 17 members being Congolese. Lovanium's student body exceeded 1,000 during the 1963-64 academic year.

=== Preparatory institutes and extension programs ===
==== Preparatory institutes ====
In its quest to extend education beyond conventional university limits and address the educational deficiencies prevalent in the then-Republic of the Congo, Lovanium instituted a range of preparatory and outreach programs distributed across the country. These initiatives aimed at individuals who, due to various reasons, were unable to finish their secondary education but sought advanced learning opportunities. The first of these initiatives was a full-time, one-year course of scientific and general training at Kisantu, designed to prepare students with five years of secondary education for both graduate and pre-university courses. This effort was soon followed by the establishment of three additional institutes in Bukavu, Léopoldville, and Stanleyville (now Kisangani) during the 1962-63 academic year. These institutes were funded by a $100,000 grant from the Ford Foundation.

These preparatory institutes, colloquially referred to as the "junior college program" (though not entirely aligned with the academic rigor typically associated with junior colleges), primarily targeted individuals who had completed a four-year terminal secondary course. Kisantu offered a two-year day course, while the other three institutes provided one-year evening courses, particularly catering to those already engaged in daytime employment but eager to continue their education. Admission to these courses was open to people who had completed five years of secondary education or those who had completed four years and passed an entrance examination.

By the 1963-64 academic year, the preparatory institutes had expanded to offer evening courses to approximately 200 students, although the Stanleyville institute had ceased operations after the 1962-63 academic year. The curriculum encompassed a wide array of subjects, including biology, chemistry, English, French, geography, history, mathematics, physics, and religion or moral education. While these courses were primarily intended to prepare students for graduate programs, they did not entirely correspond to the humanities programs offered in secondary schools.

==== Extension programs ====
Lovanium extended its educational services through a variety of extension programs aimed at reaching a broader audience. These programs were administered by the University's autonomous department of University Extension, established in 1962 with the express purpose of making the university's intellectual assets accessible to a wider populace. This department was tasked with overseeing the preparatory institutes, summer sessions, and various other activities.

One of the key components of the University Extension's activities was the publication of educational materials. Among the most notable was Antennes, Chroniques Culturelles Congolaises, a bimonthly review first issued in 1961. This publication aimed to introduce the contemporary world of ideas and events to Congolese readers. The University Extension also organized conferences, radio broadcasts, study weeks, and cultural weekends. These activities were designed to engage the broader community, including those who might not have had the opportunity to pursue formal education at the university level.

==== In-service training and the Institute of Social and Economic Research ====
Through its Institute of Social and Economic Research, the university provided in-service training for Congolese managerial personnel of private companies. These individuals were selected for advancement under their companies' Africanization programs, which aimed to increase the representation of Africans in leadership positions. The Institute organized several residential seminars in business administration, with durations ranging from one week to four months. The inaugural seminar was convened prior to Congo's independence, and the program subsequently expanded in the ensuing years. During the 1962-63 academic year, the Institute planned to offer seminars on an array of pertinent topics, including economic issues, management functions, enterprise management, public administration organization, administrative work organization, technical services organization, and personnel administration.

==== Changes in pre-university courses ====
Lovanium implemented several changes in its pre-university courses. One significant change was the introduction of English as a compulsory second language in these courses. Before independence, only students preparing for engineering were required to study English. However, by the 1961-62 academic year, English had become a mandatory subject for all students in the five pre-university courses. Another notable change was the removal of Flemish from the curriculum. Before independence, Flemish was offered in the four courses that prepared students for the central jury examinations, but by the 1961-62 academic year, it had been completely phased out.

The curriculum for pre-university courses also underwent revisions in subject requirements. For example, in 1939-60, students preparing for the first central jury examination were required to study French, Latin, and philosophy, along with four other subjects from a list of eight. However, by 1962-63, all students preparing for this examination were required to take seven subjects, including Latin. Lovanium also revised the admission requirements for various scientific and medical degree courses, allowing students who passed the third central jury examination, which did not include Latin, to enter these courses for the first time.

Languages continued to hold a prominent place in the pre-university curriculum. In the 1962-63 academic year, over half of the total time allocated to required subjects in the courses leading to the first, second, and fourth central jury examinations was devoted to English, French, and, where offered, Latin. If the course in African culture and linguistics was included, this proportion rose to 70 percent for the courses leading to the first and fourth examinations. In contrast, mathematics was allocated 60 percent of the time dedicated to required subjects in the course leading to the third examination.

=== Transition to the National University of Zaire ===
In August 1971, the university merged with two other universities in the Congo to form the federalized National University of Zaire (Université Nationale du Zaïre; UNAZA). Between 1980 and 1991, the universities were again divided into three institutions, the University of Kinshasa, Kisangani University, and the University of Lubumbashi.

== Financial support and contributions ==
Throughout its early years, Lovanium University relied heavily on external financial backing to sustain its functions and extend its infrastructure. The Belgian government provided an annual subsidy of 61,680,000 Congolese francs, which constituted a substantial portion of the university's operational budget. West Germany extended support to Lovanium University through hard currency grants, specifically designated for the development and equipping of key university facilities. In 1962, West Germany allocated $950,000 for the construction and equipping of a student dormitory and $1,300,000 for a hospital clinic, along with $8,000 for eight scholarships.

The United States, through its Agency for International Development, contributed $409,000 for one-third of the student dormitory construction expenses and $330,000 for the expansion of the medical school. Moreover, USAID dispensed scholarship grants in several academic years: $400,000 in 1961-62, $240,000 in 1962-63, and $400,000 in 1963-64.

== Faculties ==
Lovanium University consisted of several faculties including:

- Agriculture
- Engineering
- Law
- Medicine
- Philosophy and Letters
- Political, Social and Economic Sciences
- Psychology and Pedagogy
- Sciences
- Theology

== Notable alumni ==
- Valentin Bankumuhari
- Simon Mbatshi Batshia
- Barthélémy Bisengimana
- Jacques Depelchin
- Nkulu Mitumba Kilombo
- Valentin Y. Mudimbe
- Jean-Jacques Muyembe-Tamfum
- Albert Ndele
- Pius Ngandu Nkashama
- Clémentine Nzuji
- Angela Okolo
- Étienne Tshisekedi

== Notable faculty ==
- Marcel Lihau
- Sophie Kanza
- Daniel Biebuyck
- Luc Gillon
