= Joakim Reiter =

Swedish business executive and public servant

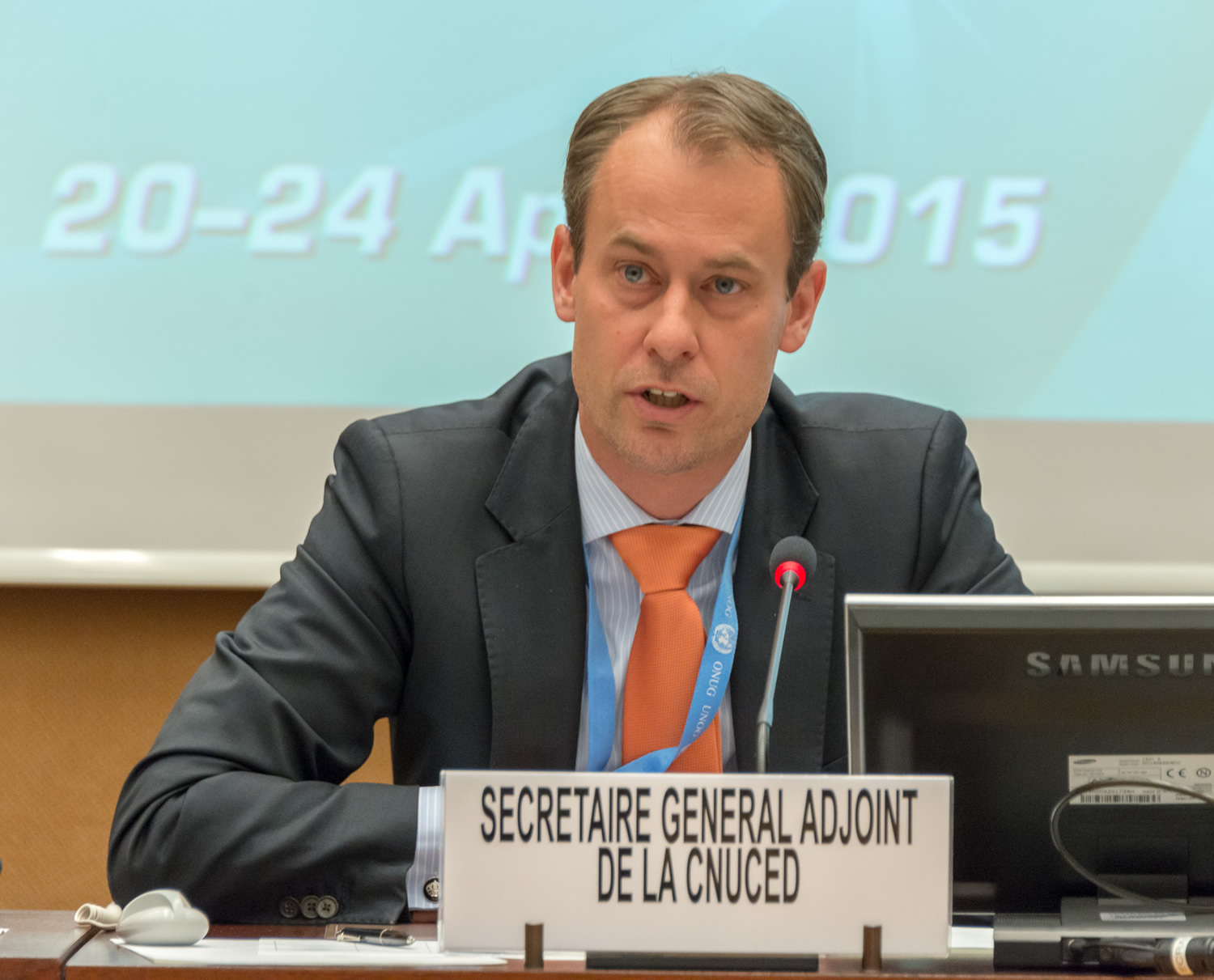
Joakim Reiter in 2015

Joakim Reiter (born 1974) is a Swedish business executive and former public servant. He is Chief External and Corporate Affairs Officer of the British telecommunications company Vodafone, where he has worked since 2017.

== Career ==
Reiter was appointed on 8 January 2015 by United Nations Secretary-General Ban Ki-moon as Deputy Secretary-General of the United Nations Conference on Trade and Development. Prior to this, he served as a Deputy Director-General with the Ministry for Foreign Affairs of Sweden.

In addition to heading the Department for International Trade Policy within the Ministry for Foreign Affairs of Sweden, Reiter held the positions of Ambassador and Permanent Representative of Sweden to the World Trade Organization and senior-level positions with the Swedish National Board of Trade.

On 13 March 2017, Vodafone appointed Reiter as Group External Affairs Director, effective 1 August 2017.
