= Jean-Claude Willame =

Emeritus Belgian professor

- Born: Jean-Claude Willame; 28 March 1938 (age 88)
- Spouse: Isabelle Durant

Academic background
- Education: University of California, Berkeley (PhD, 1971)
- Influences: Max Weber

Academic work
- Discipline: Political science; African studies; History
- Institutions: University of California, Berkeley; Université catholique de Louvain; Université nationale du Zaïre; Centre d'études et de documentation africaines (CEDAF)
- Notable works: Patrimonialism and Political Change in the Congo (1972); Patrice Lumumba: La crise congolaise revisitée (1990); Aux sources de l'hécatombe rwandaise (1995); Banyarwanda et Banyamulenge: Violences ethniques et gestion de l'identitaire au Kivu (1997)
- Website: uclouvain.be/fr/repertoires/jean-claude.willame

Jean-Claude Willame (born 28 March 1938) is a Belgian professor emeritus specialised in the political history of the Democratic Republic of the Congo. He obtained his PhD in political science at the University of California, Berkeley in 1971. He was a professor at the Université nationale du Zaïre (National University of Zaire) from 1971 to 1975. In 1989, he was the deputy director of the Centre d'études et de documentation africaines (CEDAF), which developed into the contemporary history section at the Royal Museum for Central Africa in Tervuren. He retired as a professor at the UCLouvain Faculty of Economic, Social and Political Sciences and Communication at the Université Catholique de Louvain. As an independent expert within the Coimbra Group, Willame went to Congo-Kinshasa and Congo-Brazzaville to study opportunities of cooperation between the European Union and ACP countries.

He is married to Isabelle Durant, former Belgian Deputy Prime Minister and Minister of Mobility and Transport (1999–2003), who became Deputy Secretary-General of the United Nations Conference on Trade and Development (UNCTAD) in 2017.

== Publications ==
- Willame, Jean-Claude, Patrice Lumumba: La Crise congolaise revisitée, Karthala, 1990, 496 p.
- Willame, Jean-Claude, L'automne d'un despotisme. Pouvoir, argent et obéissance dans le Zaïre des années quatre-vingt, Karthala, 1992, 226 p.
- Willame, Jean-Claude, Aux sources de l'hécatombe rwandaise, Cahiers africains/Afrika studies, 14, 1995, 171 p.
- Willame, Jean-Claude, Banyarwanda et Banyamulenge : Violences ethniques et gestion de l'identitaire au Kivu, Cahiers africains/Afrika studies, 25, 1997, 156 p.
- Willame, Jean-Claude, L'odyssée Kabila: Trajectoire pour un Congo nouveau?, Karthala, 1999, 256 p.
