= 1939 in Belgium =

- Decades: 1910s; 1920s; 1930s; 1940s; 1950s
- See also: Other events of 1939; List of years in Belgium

Events of the year 1939 in Belgium.

== Incumbents ==
- Monarch: Leopold III
- Prime Minister: Paul-Henri Spaak (to 22 February); Hubert Pierlot (from 22 February)

== Events ==
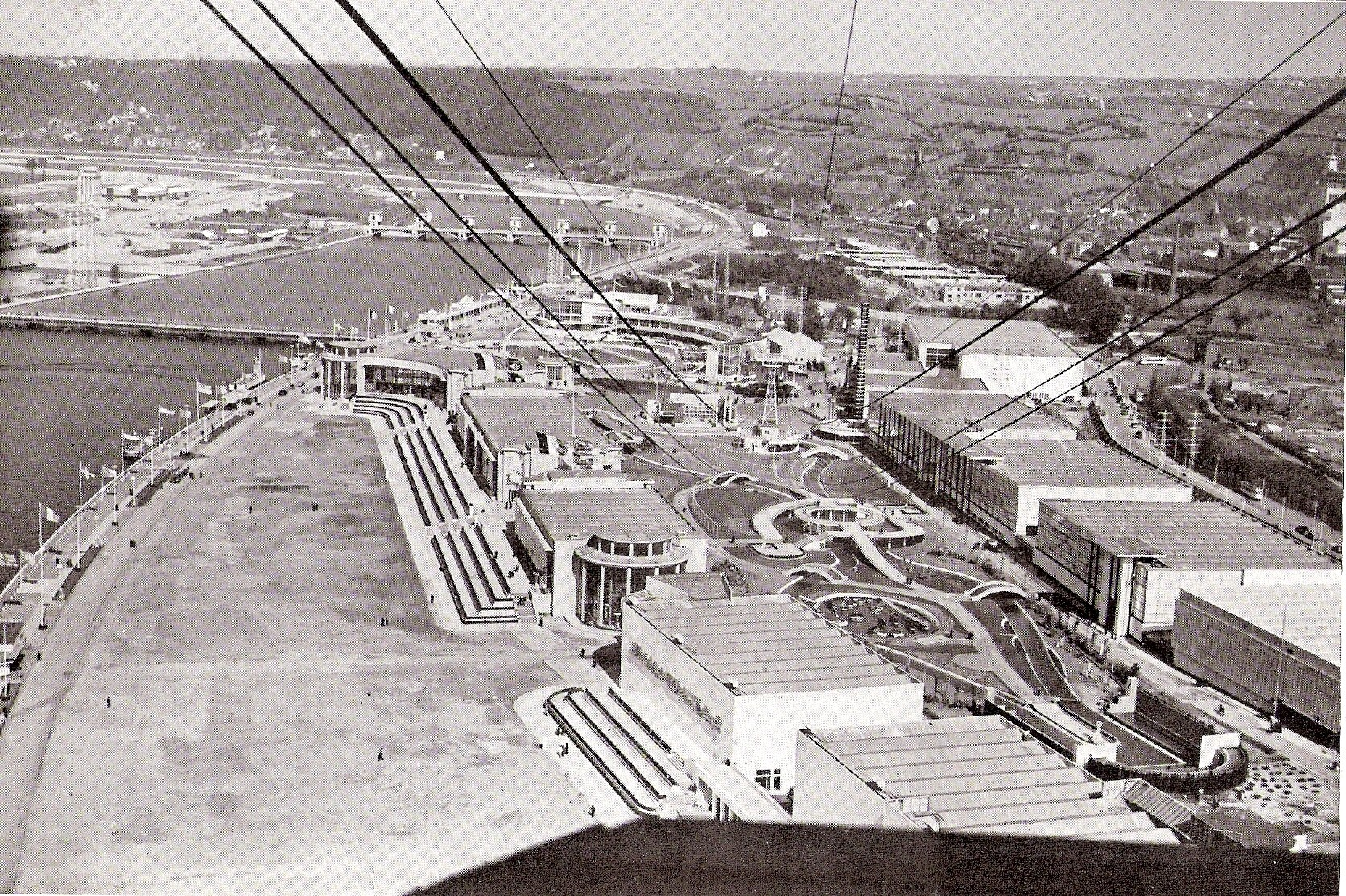
A view of the Exposition internationale de l'eau in Liège from a cable car

- 9 February – Paul-Henri Spaak's coalition government falls apart
- 22 February – Hubert Pierlot forms Catholic–Socialist coalition
- 2 April – 1939 Belgian general election
- 18 April – Hubert Pierlot forms Catholic–Liberal coalition
- 25 June – Hermann Lang wins the 1939 Belgian Grand Prix at Spa-Francorchamps
- 30 July – Exposition internationale de l'eau opens in Liège
- 25 August – Belgian Armed Forces begin mobilisation
- 3 September – Hubert Pierlot forms government of national unity

== Publications ==
- Hergé, Le Sceptre d'Ottokar (serialised in Le Petit Vingtième from 4 August 1938 to 10 August 1939) published as an album
- Georges Simenon, Le Bourgmestre de Furnes
- Gerard Walschap, Houtekiet

== Art and architecture ==
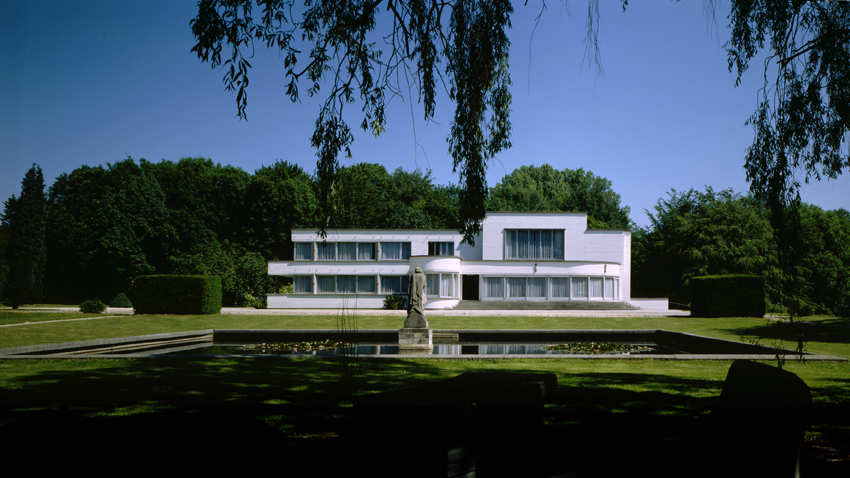
Queen Elisabeth Music Chapel (Waterloo)

Buildings

- Queen Elisabeth Music Chapel on the Argenteuil Estate in Waterloo

Paintings

- René Magritte, The Palace of Memories

== Births ==
- 21 February – May Claerhout, artist (died 2016)
- 9 March – Jos Van Gorp, actor (died 2021)
- 12 April – Philippe Moureaux, politician (died 2018)
- 9 June – Johan Weyts, politician (died 2021)
- 3 July – Willy Vanden Berghen, road bicycle racer

== Deaths ==
- 6 January – Georges Ista (born 1874), writer
- 15 February – Henri Jaspar (born 1870), politician
- 6 March – Michel Levie (born 1851), politician
- 14 March – Marie Haps (born 1879), philanthropist
- 25 June – Richard Seaman (born 1913), racing driver, dies after crashing in the 1939 Belgian Grand Prix
- 6 November – Adolphe Max (born 1869), politician
- 23 November – Gaston-Antoine Rasneur (born 1874), bishop
