= 1941 in Belgium =

- Decades: 1920s; 1930s; 1940s; 1950s; 1960s
- See also: Other events of 1941; List of years in Belgium

Events in the year 1941 in Belgium

== Incumbents ==
- Monarch: Leopold III (prisoner)
- Prime Minister: Hubert Pierlot (in exile)
- Head of the occupying Military Administration in Belgium and Northern France: Alexander von Falkenhausen
- Head of the administrative staff of the Occupation: Eggert Reeder

== Events ==
- 1 January – Léon Degrelle calls on Belgians to collaborate with Nazi Germany.
- 14 January – Radio Belgique launches V for Victory campaign.
- 21 January – Belgian government in exile reaches an agreement with the United Kingdom that Belgian Congo will become part of the Sterling area and enter the war on the allied side.
- 3 March – Dedicated Dutch-language Radio België begins broadcasting from London.
- 25 March – Twenty leading figures from the vicinity of Liège taken hostage in retaliation to sabotage of the railway, including former government minister of public works, Jules Joseph Merlot.
- 5 May – Flemish collaborationist organisations Vlaams Nationaal Verbond and Verdinaso, and the Flemish section of the Rexist Party, sign an agreement to merge.
- 16 May – Anniversary of the German invasion marked by strikes.
- 22 June – 337 left-wing activists arrested to prevent.
- 25 November – Université libre de Bruxelles closes to protest plans to appoint pro-German professors.
- 6 December – King Leopold marries Lilian Baels in captivity.

== Births ==
- 3 February – Antoine Duquesne, politician (died 2010)
- 25 February – Nelly Maes, politician
- 16 May – Andreas De Leenheer, biologist (died 2022)
- 21 March – Dirk Frimout, astronaut
- 28 March – Walter van den Broeck, writer
- 31 May – Nicole Van Goethem, illustrator (died 2000)
- 6 July – Alfons Vansteenwegen, communication theorist
- 2 August – Jean Cornelis, footballer (died 2016)
- 5 August – August Verhaegen, cyclist (died 2012)
- 8 August – Hubert Schoonbroodt, musician (died 1992)
- 20 September – Alix de Lannoy, noblewoman (died 2012)
- 23 September – Rita Van De Velde, gymnast
- 28 September – Lucas Van Looy, bishop
- 30 September – Els Witte, historian
- 2 October – Jean Vallée, entertainer (died 2014)
- 20 October – Leopold Lippens, politician (died 2021)
- 24 October – Frank Aendenboom, entertainer (died 2018)
- 26 October – Bob de Groot, cartoonist
- 17 November – Thierry de Gruben, diplomat
- 26 November – Constant Bens, wrestler
- 23 December – Serge Reding, weightlifter (died 1975)

== Deaths ==
- 18 February – George Minne (born 1866), poet
- 9 March – Paul Hymans (born 1865), politician
- 28 August – Sybille de Selys Longchamps, noblewoman
- 16 September – Valerius De Saedeleer (born 1867), painter
- 25 October – Renée de Merode (born 1859), noblewoman
