= 1930 in Belgium =

- Decades: 1910s; 1920s; 1930s; 1940s; 1950s
- See also: Other events of 1930; List of years in Belgium

Events in the year 1930 in Belgium.

== Incumbents ==
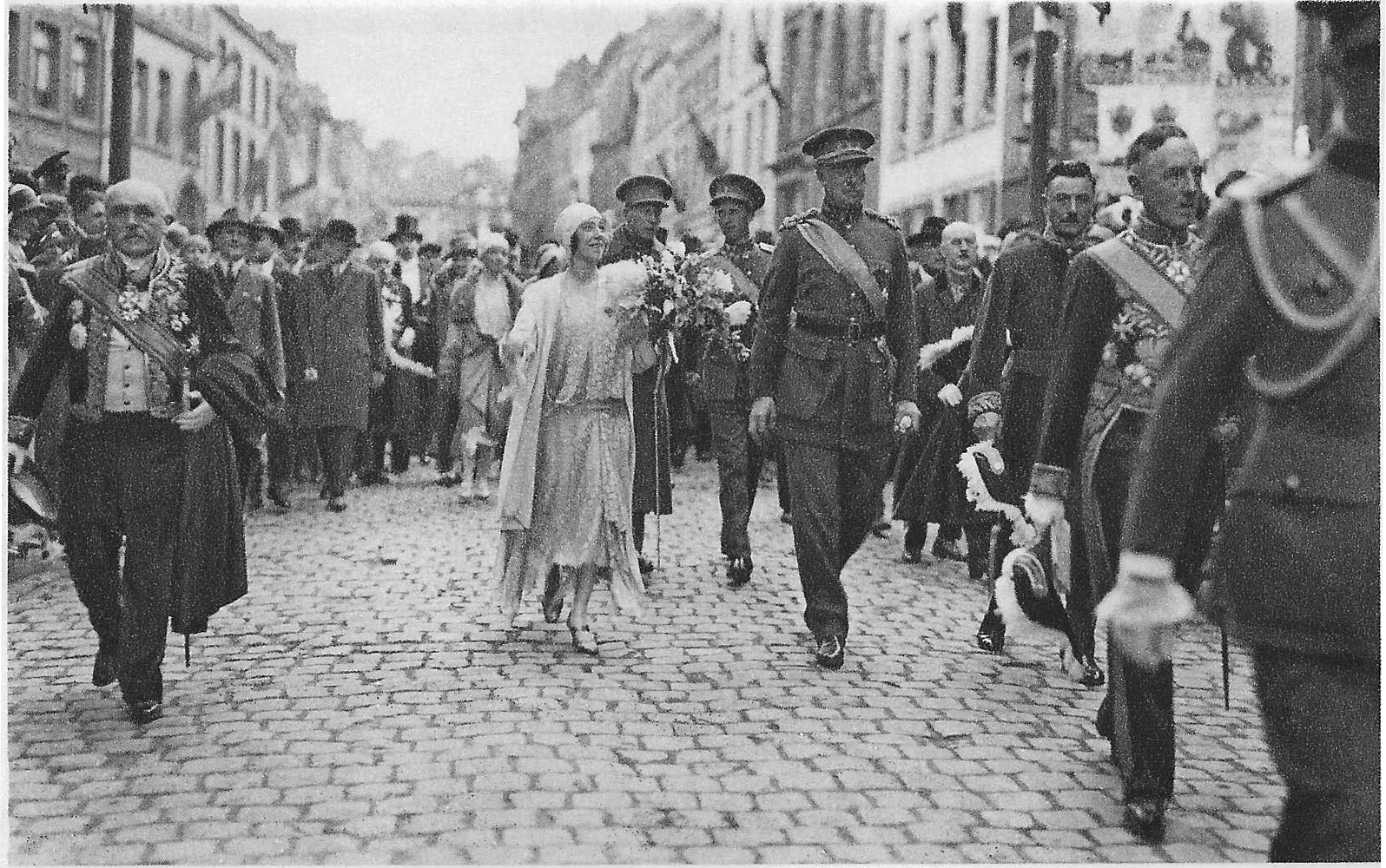
Royal family visiting Mons in June 1930.

Monarch – Albert I
Prime Minister – Henri Jaspar

== Events ==
- 3 May to 3 November – Exposition internationale held in Liège with simultaneous International Exhibition of Colonies, Shipping and Flemish Art held in Antwerp.
- June – Royal visit to Mons.
- 20 July – Louis Chiron wins the 1930 Belgian Grand Prix at Spa–Francorchamps.

== Publications ==
- Album souvenir de l'exposition internationale d'Anvers 1930 (Géo M. Potié).
- Madeline Brandeis, Little Philippe of Belgium (New York, Grosset & Dunlap).

== Art and architecture ==
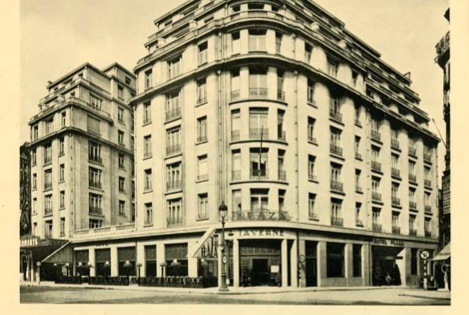
Hotel Le Plaza, Brussels

- Hotel Le Plaza, Brussels opens

== Births ==
- 19 February
  - Jan Goossens, linguist
  - Alfons Verplaetse, national banker (died 2020)
- 18 April – Michel Didisheim, royal secretary (died 2020)
- 12 June – Herman Daled, art collector (died 2020)
- 21 June – Yvette Alloo, paralympian (died 2020)
- 7 September
  - Prince Baudouin (died 1993)
  - Paul-Baudouin Michel, musicologist (died 2020)
- 16 December – Jean Herbiet, theatre artistic director (died 2008)

== Deaths ==
- 12 February – Eva Dell'Acqua (born 1856), operatic composer
- 11 September – Charles Lemonnier (born 1860), mayor of Brussels
- 16 September – Julien Liebaert (born 1848), politician
- 15 October – Albert Grisar (born 1870), sailor
- 27 December – Eugène Henry (born 1862), Governor General of Congo
