= 1936 in Belgium =

- Decades: 1910s; 1920s; 1930s; 1940s; 1950s
- See also: Other events of 1936; List of years in Belgium

Events in the year 1936 in Belgium.

== Incumbents ==
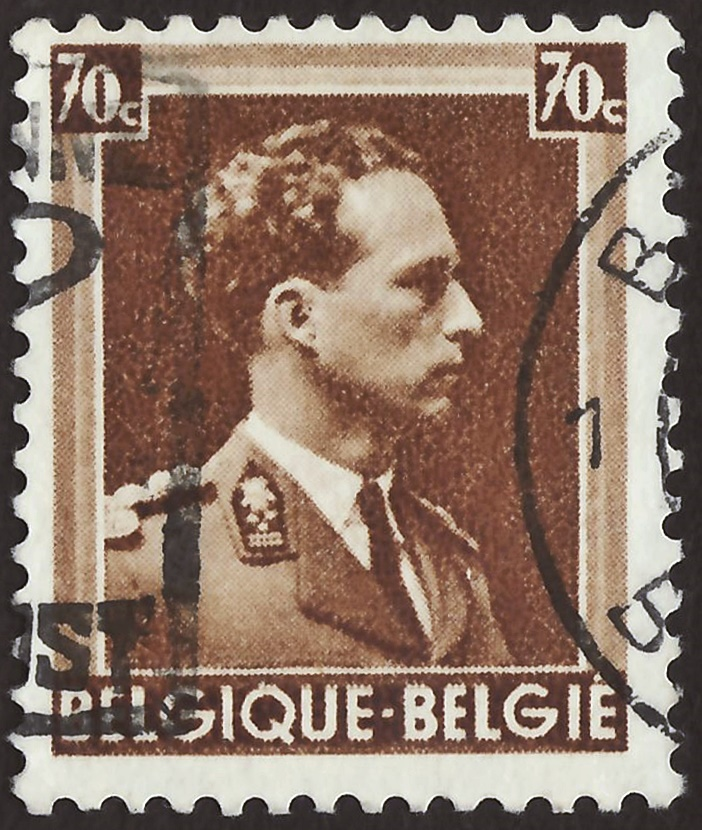
Leopold III on a 1936 postage stamp

- Monarch: Leopold III
- Prime Minister: Paul van Zeeland

== Events ==
- January – Remains of Father Damien shipped to Belgium for reburial
- 24 May – Legislative elections
- 7 June – Provincial elections
- September – Sixth Catholic Congress in Mechelen
- DeVlag (Deutsch-Vlämische Arbeitsgemeinschaft) founded to facilitate cultural exchange with Nazi Germany

== Publications ==
- Emmanuel d'Hooghvorst, J’accuse Léon Degrelle
- Maurice Grevisse, Le Bon Usage
- Hergé, Le Lotus bleu (serialised 1934–35) published as an album
- Charles Plisnier, Mariages
- Georges Simenon, 45° à l'ombre, Les Demoiselles de Concarneau, L'Évadé, Long Cours
- Felix Timmermans, Het Vlaamsche volksleven volgens Pieter Breughel

== Art ==
- Paul Delvaux, Le Miroir, Femme dans une grotte, La Fenêtre, La Rose, Les Belles de nuit, Le Cortège des dentelles
- René Magritte's first solo exhibition in the United States (Julien Levy Gallery, New York)

== Births ==
- 10 January – Lucienne Stassaert, poet (died 2026)
- 19 April – Wilfried Martens, prime minister (died 2013)
- 24 May – Patrick Nothomb, diplomat (died 2020)
- 6 July – Grand Jojo, singer-songwriter (died 2021)
- 16 July – Leo Sterckx, Olympic cyclist (died 2023)
- 29 July – Frans Geysen, composer and writer (died 2026)
- 6 October – Jacqueline Van Quaille, operatic soprano (died 2026)
- 7 November – Roger Vangheluwe, Roman Catholic bishop and sexual abuser (died 2026)
- 30 November – Eric Walter Elst, astronomer (died 2022)
- 25 December – Marnix Vincent, literary translator (died 2016)

== Deaths ==
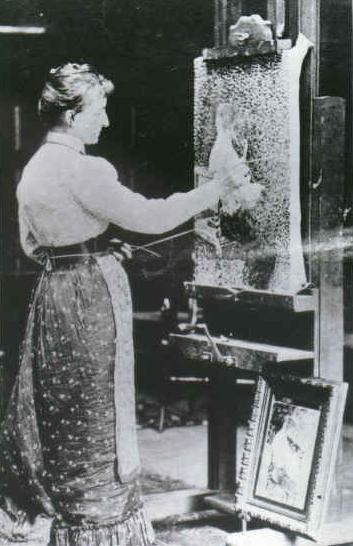
The painter Anna Boch (died 1936)

- 3 January – Jules Destrée (born 1863), socialist
- 25 February – Anna Boch (born 1848), painter
- 5 March – Georges Hobé (born 1854), architect
- 8 May – Paul Spaak (born 1871), poet
- 16 September – Pol Demade (born 1863), writer
- 4 October – Privat Livemont (born 1861), artist
- 11 October – Joseph Jacquemotte (born 1883), anarcho-syndicalist
