= Marnix =

Marnix may refer to:

== People ==
- the medieval and early modern house of Marnix, whose name originates from an eponymous hamlet of Nattages in today’s France, e.g.:
  - Jan van Marnix (1537–1567), Lord of Toulouse, Flemish noble, rebel leader who died in the Battle of Oosterweel
  - Philips of Marnix, Lord of Saint-Aldegonde (1540-1598), Flemish writer, statesman and adviser to William of Orange; probable author of the Dutch national anthem Wilhelmus
- Marnix Gijsen (1899–1984), Flemish writer
- Marnix Vincent (1936–2016), Belgian literary translator
- Marnix Kappers (1943–2016), Dutch cabaret artist and actor
- Marnix Lameire (born 1955), Belgian road cyclist
- Marnix Van Holsbeeck (born 1957), Belgian and American radiologist
- Marnix Vervinck (born 1959), Belgian Olympic archer
- Marnix van Rij (born 1960), Dutch CDA politician
- Marnix Verhegghe (born 1961), Belgian hammer thrower
- Marnix ten Kortenaar (born 1970), Dutch-Austrian speed skater
- Marnix Lippmann (born 1974), Bassist
- Marnix Smit (born 1975), Dutch footballer
- Marnix Kolder (born 1981), Dutch footballer

== Other uses ==
- Castle Marnix de Sainte-Aldegonde, the residence of the Marnix family in Bornem, Antwerp, Belgium
- HNLMS Marnix, a school ship of the Royal Netherlands navy
- Marnix Gymnasium, in Rotterdam, Netherlands
- 5002 Marnix (1987 SS3), a main-belt asteroid

== See also ==
- Marnick Vermijl (born 1992), Belgian footballer
- Marnicq Bervoets (born 1969), Belgian motocross racer
