= 1940 in Belgium =

- Decades: 1920s; 1930s; 1940s; 1950s; 1960s
- See also: Other events of 1940; List of years in Belgium

Events in the year 1940 in Belgium

== Incumbents ==
- Monarch: Leopold III (prisoner of war from 28 May)
- Prime Minister: Hubert Pierlot (in exile from 28 May)
- Head of the occupying Military Administration in Belgium and Northern France: Alexander von Falkenhausen
- Head of the administrative staff of the Occupation: Eggert Reeder

== Events ==
- 10 January – Mechelen incident: German military plane crashes near Maasmechelen.
- 26 April – King Leopold III rejects the government's resignation.
- 10 to 28 May – Battle of Belgium
  - 10 to 11 May – Battle of Fort Eben-Emael
  - 12 to 14 May – Battle of Hannut
  - 14 to 15 May – Battle of Gembloux
  - 22 May – Alexander von Falkenhausen appointed to the head of the Military Administration in Belgium and Northern France
  - 23 to 28 May – Battle of the Lys
  - 25 May – Leopold III declares that he will remain with his troops and share their fate
  - 25 to 28 May – Vinkt Massacre
  - 26 May – Dunkirk evacuation begins
  - 28 May – Leopold III capitulates to the invading forces, contrary to ministerial advice.
- 31 May – Belgian parliament in exile meets in Limoges
- 6 June – Civil-service secretaries-general empowered to keep Belgian ministries running while the government is in exile.
- 10 June – The International Red Cross estimates Belgian refugees in France to number 2.2 million.
- 28 June – Belgian Labour Party dissolved.
- 15 August – Newspaper La Libre Belgique begins clandestine publication.
- 10 October – Jews banned from public office by decree of the occupying forces.
- 28 October – Belgian government in exile, having been dispersed in France, Spain and Switzerland, re-established in London.
- 19 November – King Leopold III in Berchtesgarden makes a personal appeal to Hitler for the release of Belgian prisoners of war.
- 22 November – Single overarching trade union established.

== Births ==
- 2 January – Florent Bessemans, fencer
- 4 January – Léon Semmeling, footballer
- 18 January
  - Élisabeth Burdot, journalist (died 2021)
  - Serdu, cartoonist and illustrator (died 2025)
- 5 February – Panamarenko, artist (died 2019)
- 22 February – Els De Bens, academic (died 2025)
- 23 February – Remi Vermeiren, banker
- 12 April – José Gotovitch, historian (died 2024)
- 24 May – Hilde Houben-Bertrand, politician
- 6 June – Nicolas Dumont, Olympic athlete
- 7 July – Irène Sweyd, Olympic athlete
- 7 August – Jean-Luc Dehaene, Prime Minister 1992-1999 (died 2014)
- 25 August – José van Dam, bass-baritone (died 2026)
- 12 October – Yvan Covent, cyclist (died 2011)
- 27 December – William Cliff, poet

== Deaths ==
- 10 January – Pierre Imperiali (born 1874), politician
- 27 January – Léon Frédéric (born 1856), painter
- 30 January – André Léon Tonnoir (born 1885), entomologist
- 10 February – Paulin Ladeuze (born 1870), theologian
- 11 February – Joseph Henri Honoré Boex (born 1856), author
- 22 February – Eugène Laermans (born 1864), painter
- 14 March – Flori van Acker (born 1858), painter
- 19 March – Gustave Sap (born 1886), politician
- 29 April – Jules Feller (born 1859), academician
- 12 May – Michel D'Hooghe (born 1912), cyclist
- 20 May – Joris Van Severen (born 1894), far-right politician
- 18 June – Robert Feyerick (born 1892), Olympic athlete
- 24 June – Frédéric-Vincent Lebbe (born 1877), missionary
- 29 August – Arthur De Greef (born 1862), composer
- 30 August — Hélène Mallebrancke (born 1902), engineer and resister
- 5 September – Charles de Broqueville (born 1860), former Prime Minister
- 9 September – Albert du Roy de Blicquy (born 1869), general
- 23 September – Marcel Van Crombrugge (born 1880), Olympic athlete
- 7 October – Marie de Bièvre (born 1865), painter
- 17 October – Lucien Linden (born 1851), botanist
- 3 November – Julien Vervaecke (born 1899), cyclist
- 8 November – Arthur Vierendeel (born 1852), civil engineer
- 16 November – Léon Dens (born 1869), politician
