= 1937 in Belgium =

- Decades: 1910s; 1920s; 1930s; 1940s; 1950s
- See also: Other events of 1937; List of years in Belgium

Events in the year 1937 in Belgium.

== Incumbents ==
Monarch – Leopold III
Prime Minister – Paul van Zeeland (to 24 November); Paul-Émile Janson (from 24 November)

== Events ==
- 22 to 25 May – King Leopold III makes a state visit to Britain.
- 20 June – 25th Gordon Bennett Cup held in Brussels.

== Publications ==
- Hergé, L'Oreille cassée (serialised December 1935 to February 1937)
- Henri Pirenne, Mahomet et Charlemagne (posthumous)
- H. E. Reed, Hogs in Belgian Agriculture (Washington D.C., United States Department of Agriculture Bureau of Agricultural Economics)

== Art and architecture ==
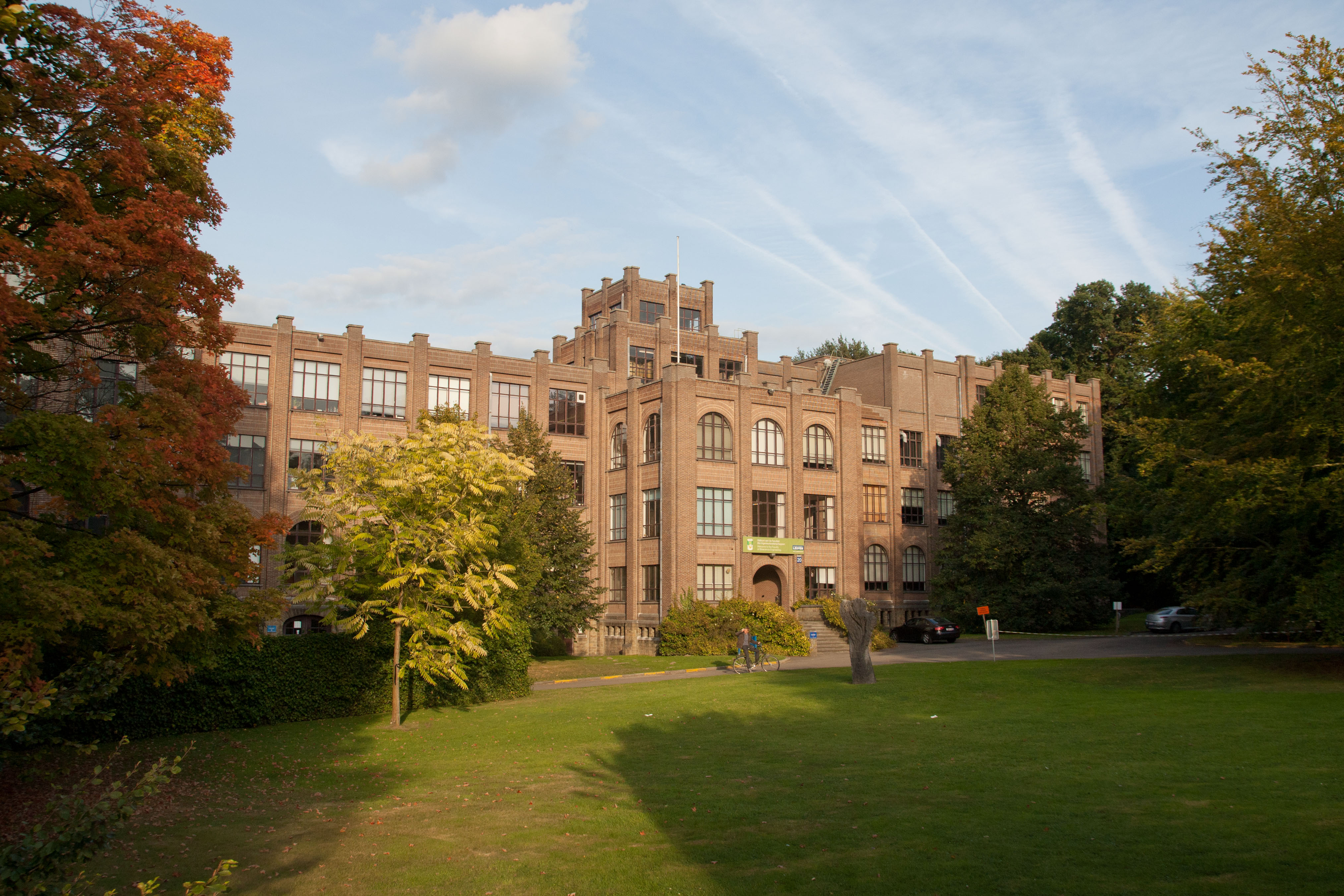
Institute of Agriculture in the park of Arenberg Castle, Heverlee

Buildings

- Raymond Lemaire, Institute of Agriculture, Heverlee

Paintings

- René Magritte, La Reproduction Interdite

== Births ==
- 1 January – Willy Kuijpers, politician (died 2020)
- 3 November – Gaspard Hons, poet (died 2020)

== Deaths ==
- 8 November – Joseph Mansion (born 1877), philologist
