= 1929 in Belgium =

- Decades: 1900s; 1910s; 1920s; 1930s; 1940s
- See also: Other events of 1929; List of years in Belgium

Events in the year 1929 in Belgium.

== Incumbents ==
Monarch – Albert I
Prime Minister – Henri Jaspar

== Events ==
- 5 January – Schelde dike breached; flooding around Dendermonde.
- February – Pierre Charles becomes European heavyweight champion.
- 17 April – Rail disaster when Paris to Brussels Express runs into a goods train near Halle in thick mist.
- 26 May – Legislative elections; Lucie Dujardin, on the Belgian Labour Party ticket in Liège, the first woman elected to parliament.
- 9 June – Provincial elections
- 31 August – Contract signed to return Belgian concession of Tianjin to direct Chinese rule (coming into effect March 1931).

== Publications ==
- Hergé's The Adventures of Tintin first published in Le Petit Vingtième (10 January)
- Emile Vandervelde, Le pays d'Israel: un marxiste en Palestine (Paris, Rieder)

== Art and architecture ==
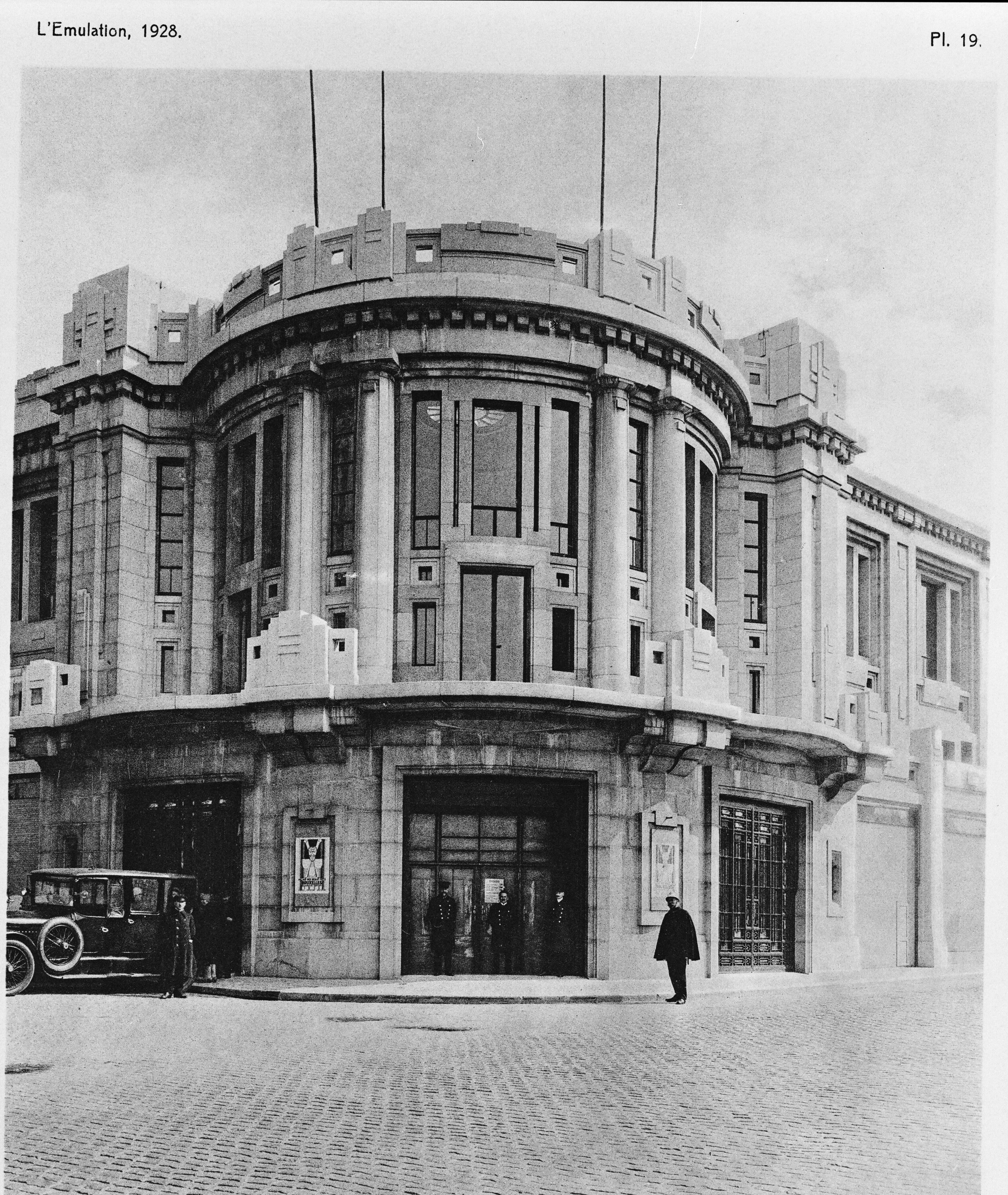
Victor Horta, Palace of Fine Arts, Brussels

Buildings

- Victor Horta, Palace of Fine Arts, Brussels (begun 1923)

Paintings

- René Magritte, La Trahison des images

== Births ==
- 8 April – Jacques Brel, entertainer (died 1978)
- 2 June – Frédéric Devreese, composer (died 2020)
- 8 July – Édouard Close, politician (died 2017).
- 26 August – Maurice Tempelsman, businessman (died 2025 in the United States)
- 14 September – Jan Vansina, historian and anthropologist (died 2017).
- 25 November – Marcel De Corte, footballer (died 2017).

== Deaths ==
- 24 August – Karel van de Woestijne, writer (born 1878)
- 13 December – Philippe Wolfers, jeweller (born 1858)
- 26 December – Albert Giraud, poet (born 1860)
