= 1935 in Belgium =

- Decades: 1910s; 1920s; 1930s; 1940s; 1950s
- See also: Other events of 1935; List of years in Belgium

Events in the year 1935 in Belgium.

== Incumbents ==
Monarch – Leopold III
Prime Minister – Georges Theunis (to 25 March); Paul van Zeeland (from 25 March)

== Events ==
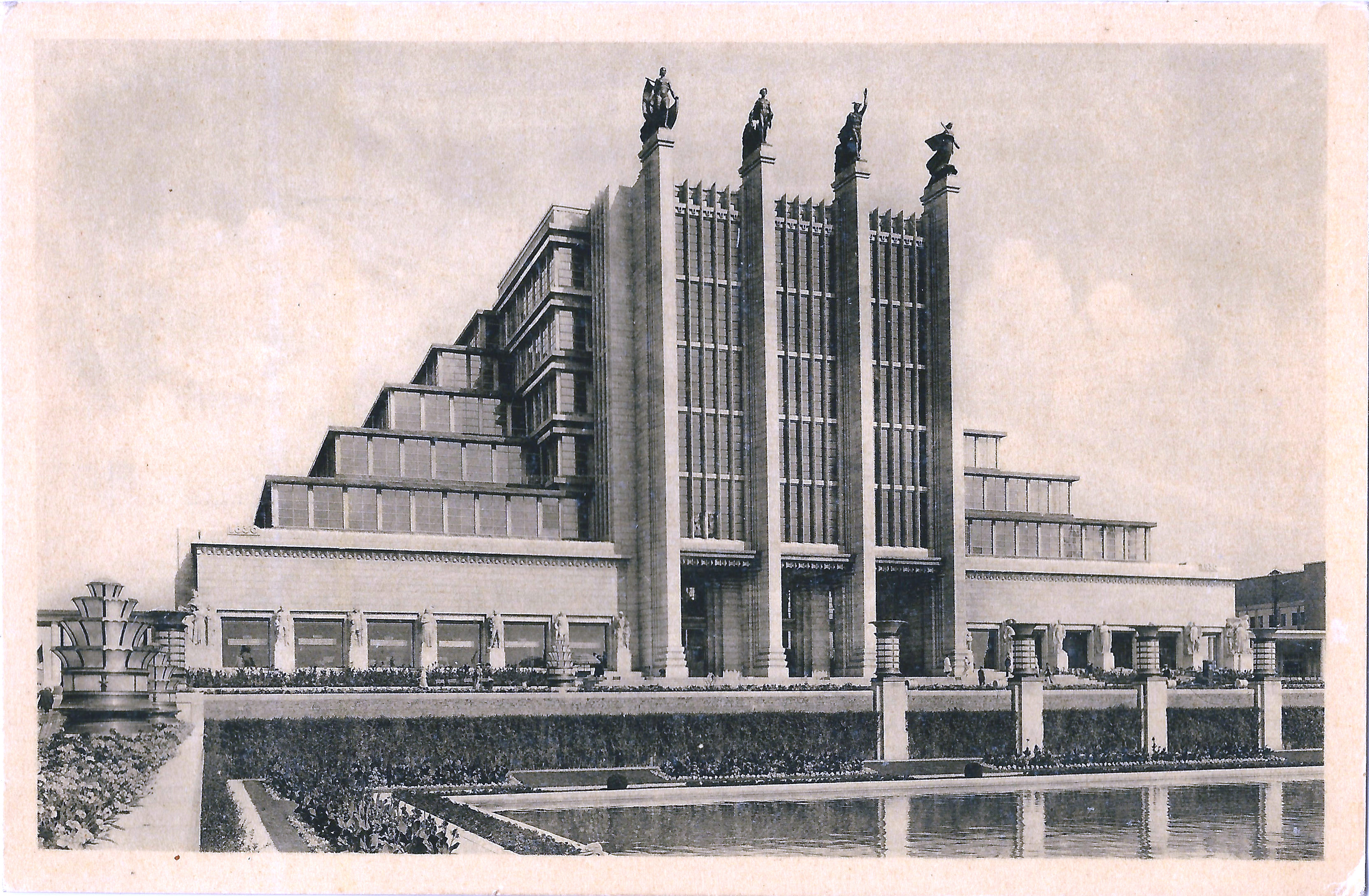
Brussels Expo, 1935

- 27 April to 6 November – Brussels International Exposition (1935) held in Heysel, near Brussels.

== Publications ==
- Emile Cammaerts, Albert of Belgium, Defender of Right (New York, Macmillan Co.)

== Art and architecture ==
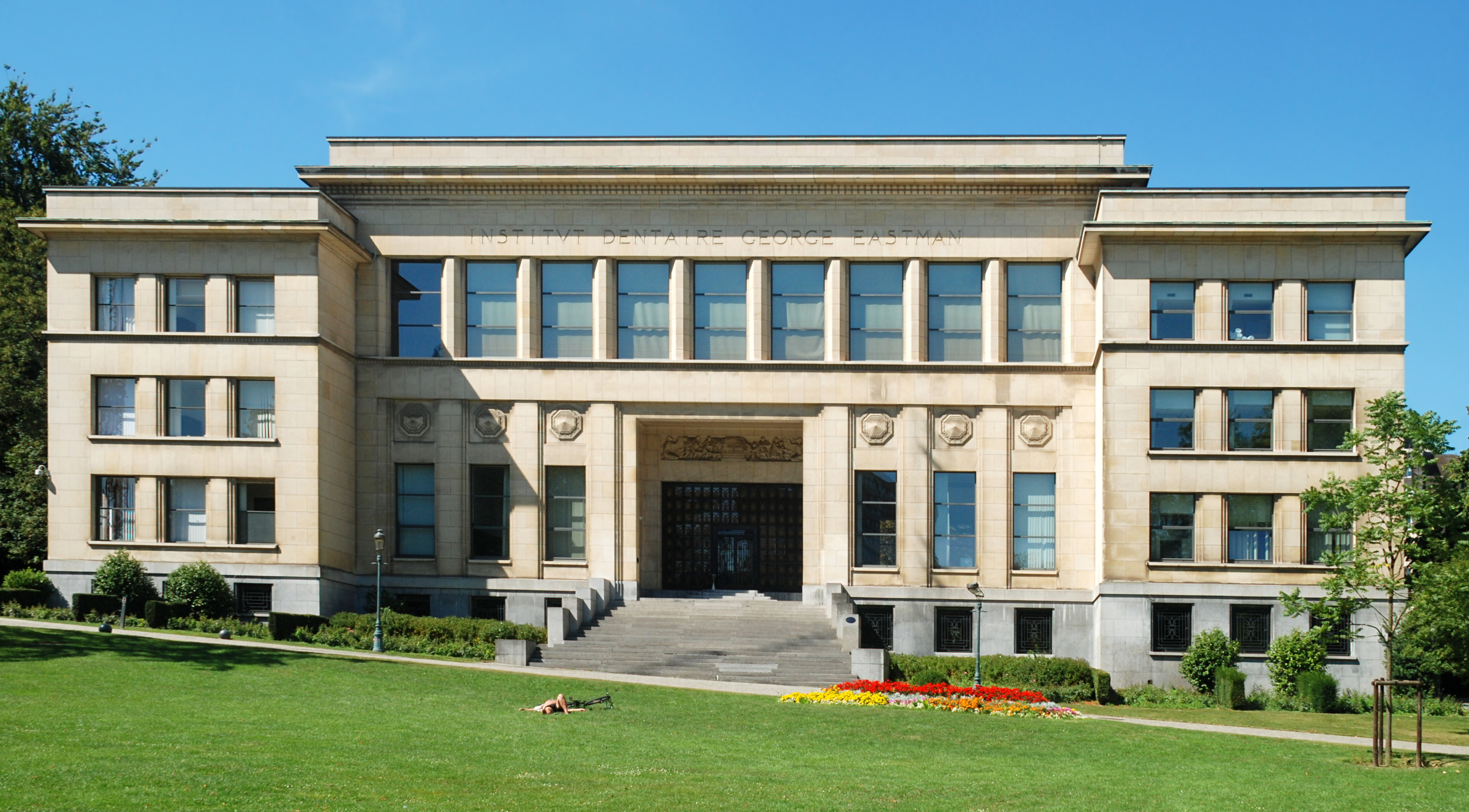
Eastman Building, Brussels

- Michel Polak's art deco Eastman Building in Brussels

== Births ==
- 21 May – Hugo Ryckeboer, dialectologist (died 2020)
- 21 August – Marcel Hendrickx, politician (died 2020)
- 28 September – Pierre Ryckmans, sinologist (died 2014)

== Deaths ==
- 29 August – Queen Astrid (born 1905)
- 14 November – Paul Bergmans (born 1868), librarian
