= Marcel Hendrickx =

Marcel Hendrickx may refer to:

- Marcel Hendrickx (cyclist)
- Marcel Hendrickx (politician)
