= Journal of Technical Writing and Communication =

- Discipline: Communication studies
- Language: English
- Edited by: Charles H. Sides

Publication details
- History: 1971-present
- Publisher: SAGE Publications
- Frequency: Quarterly

Standard abbreviations
- ISO 4: J. Tech. Writ. Commun.

Indexing
- CODEN: JTWCAA
- ISSN: 0047-2816 (print); 1541-3780 (web)
- LCCN: 79618785
- OCLC no.: 1800187

Links
- Journal homepage; Online access; Online archive

The Journal of Technical Writing and Communication is a quarterly peer-reviewed academic journal covering the diverse communication needs of industry, management, government, and academia, including audience analysis, online documentation, technical journalism, and research into communication within interdisciplinary fields. It was established in 1971 and is published by SAGE Publications. The journal's editor is Charles H. Sides (Fitchburg State University).

== Abstracting and indexing ==
The journal is abstracted and indexed in EBSCO databases, ERIC and Scopus.
