= 1928 in Belgium =

- Decades: 1900s; 1910s; 1920s; 1930s; 1940s
- See also: Other events of 1928; List of years in Belgium

Events in the year 1928 in Belgium.

== Incumbents ==
Monarch – Albert I
Prime Minister – Henri Jaspar

== Events ==
- 19 January – Wireless telegraph between Brussels and New York comes into service.
- 1 March – First Belgian newspaper published in Elisabethville, Belgian Congo (now Lubumbashi).
- 27 April – First board meeting of the newly established National Fund for Scientific Research, chaired by Émile Francqui.
- 13 May – The 1928 Liège–Bastogne–Liège cycle race is won by Belgian rider Ernest Mottard.
- June – The Belgian Open golf tournament is played at the Royal Golf Club of Belgium and is won by Albert Tingey Jr.
- 4 July – Financier Alfred Loewenstein vanishes on a Croydon Airport to Brussels.
- 29 July – Alfred Loewenstein's corpse washes ashore at Boulogne-sur-Mer
- 5 to 12 August – Socialist International meets in Brussels.
- 6 October – New sluices in Nieuwpoort breached by high water.

== Art and architecture ==
Buildings

- Alphonse Pauwels' art deco Cinema Roma opens in Borgerhout

Films

- Rigo Arnould's L'Yser premières in Brussels on 24 September

Artworks

- René Magritte “Les Amants”

== Births ==
- 1 May – Raoul Servais, filmmaker (died 2023)
- 13 May – Eugène Van Roosbroeck, racing cyclist (died 2018)
- 11 June – Queen Fabiola of Belgium, in Spain (died 2014)
- 16 June – Annie Cordy, performer (died 2020)
- 27 June – Antoinette Spaak, politician (died 2020)
- 10 July –
  - Yvette Cauquil-Prince, weaver (died 2005)
  - Herman Van der Wee, economic historian
- 26 September – Bob Van der Veken, actor (died 2019)
- 9 December – André Milhoux, racing driver
- 19 December – Annette Wademant, screenwriter (died 2017)

== Deaths ==
- 17 January – Karl Hanquet, historian, 57
- 18 March – Paul van Ostaijen, poet, 32
- 4 July – Alfred Loewenstein, financier, 51
