= 1934 in Belgium =

- Decades: 1910s; 1920s; 1930s; 1940s; 1950s
- See also: Other events of 1934; List of years in Belgium

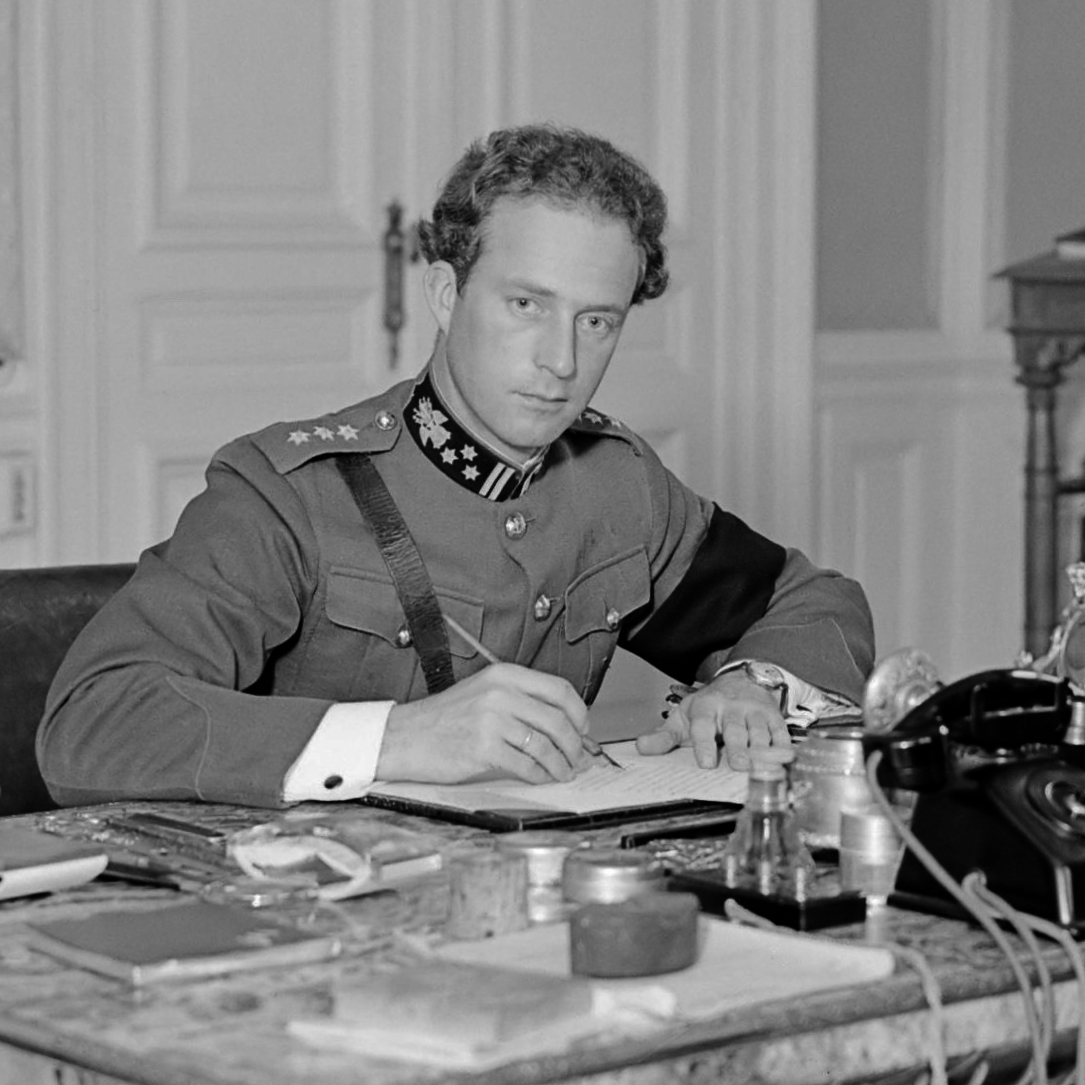
Leopold III of Belgium (1934)

Events in the year 1934 in Belgium.

== Incumbents ==
Monarch – Albert I (until 17 February); Leopold III (from 23 February)
Prime Minister – Charles de Broqueville (to 20 November); Georges Theunis (from 20 November)

== Events ==
- 6 January – First electrified railway between Brussels and Antwerp taken into use.
- 22 February – Funeral of King Albert I.
- 23 February – Leopold III sworn in as King, following the death of his father Albert I, on 17 February.
- 28 March – Socialist savings bank Bank van de Arbeid goes bankrupt.
- 16 May – Firedamp explosion in Fief-de-Lambrechies and Pâturages kills 57.
- 31 May – Law on language use in court cases passes Parliament.
- 13 November – De Broqueville government resigns.
- 20 November – New government led by Georges Theunis takes office.
- 26 November – Meteorite impact near Roisin.

== Art and architecture ==
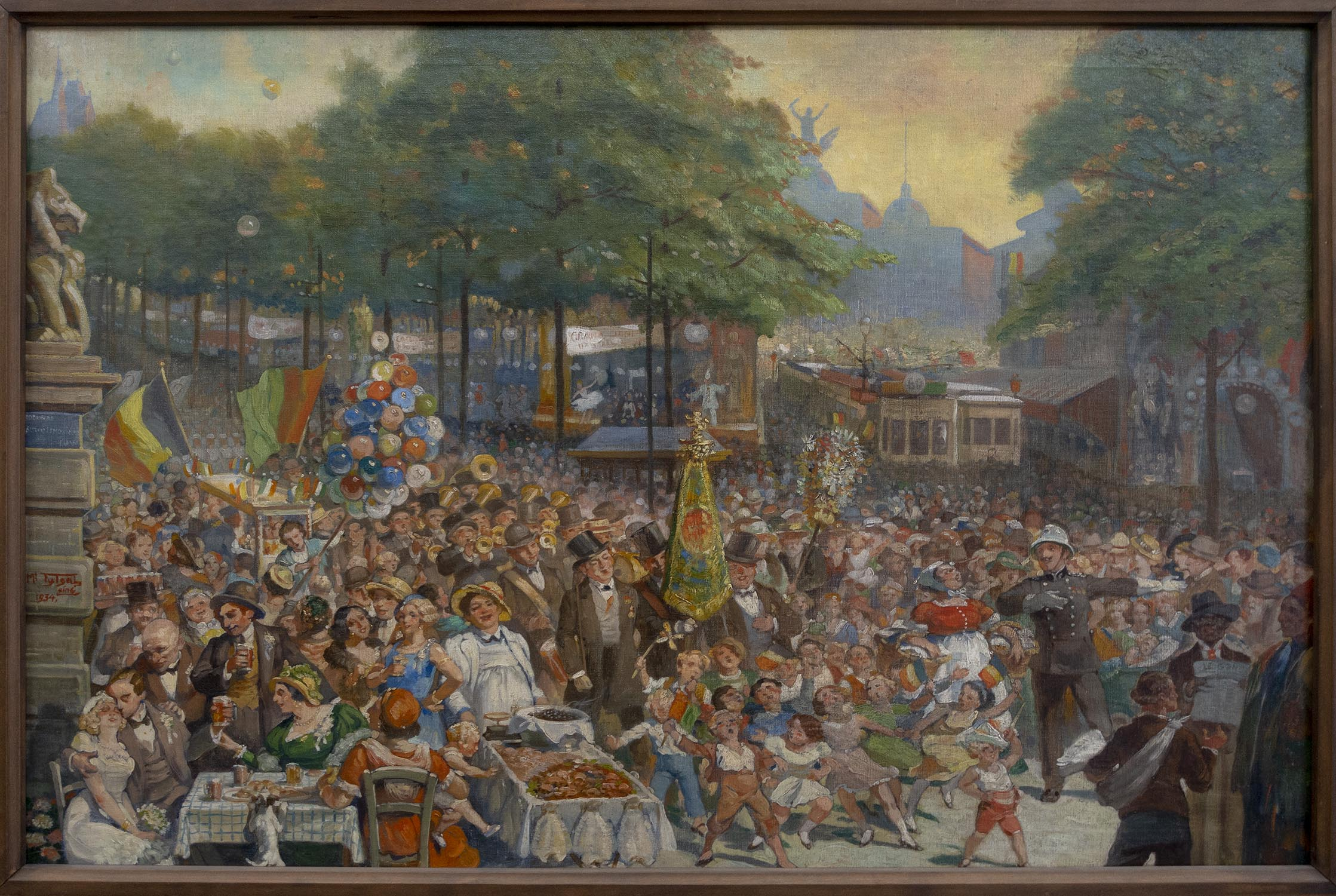
Médard Tytgat, South Fair in Brussels, (1934); Museum of the City of Brussels

Tree of Jesse stained glass in Church of Our Lady of Pamele, Oudenaarde (1934)

- 29 March – Surrealist group Rupture founded in La Louvière.
- May to June – Exhibition Le Minotaure (Brussels).
- 13 September – Belgium's first Dutch-language sound film, De Witte, screened in Antwerp.

== Publications ==
- Henry De Vocht, Monumenta Humanistica Lovaniensia: Texts and Studies about Louvain Humanists in the First Half of the XVIth Century
- Joseph Lefèvre, La secrétairerie d'état et de guerre sous le régime espagnol, 1594-1711

== Births ==
- 21 January – François van Hoobrouck d'Aspre, politician (died 2020)
- 6 June – Prince Albert, king

== Deaths ==
- 9 February – Henri Van Dyck (born 1849), painter
- 17 February – King Albert (born 1875)
