= Night Club =

Night Club may refer to:

- Nightclub, or discothèque, an entertainment venue
- Nightclub (film), a 1951 French musical crime film
- The Night Club (film), a 1925 silent film
- The Night Club (novel), a 1933 novel by Georges Simenon
- Night Club (novel), a 1945 novel by Peter Cheyney
- Night Club (1952 film), an Australian musical film
- Night Club (1989 film), an Italian film directed by Sergio Corbucci
- Night Club (2011 film), an American comedy film
- Night Club (band), an American electronic band
- Night Club (album), a 1997 album by Mr. President
- "Nightclub (Waiting for You)", a song by Bad Suns, from the album Apocalypse Whenever
- "Niteklub", a 2007 episode of Soupy Norman

== See also ==
- Nightclub two step (NC2S), a partner dance
- Club (disambiguation)
