= 1933 in Belgium =

- Decades: 1910s; 1920s; 1930s; 1940s; 1950s
- See also: Other events of 1933; List of years in Belgium

Events in the year 1933 in Belgium.

== Incumbents ==
Monarch – Albert I
Prime Minister – Charles de Broqueville

== Events ==
- 20 February – Convention regarding Establishment and Labour signed at Geneva, establishing free movement of labour between Belgium and the Netherlands.

== Publications ==
- Willem Elsschot, Kaas
- Henri Potiron, Treatise on the Accompaniment of Gregorian Chant, translated by Ruth C. Gabain (Tournai, Desclée)
- Georges Simenon, L'Âne Rouge

== Births ==
- 1 February – Raymond van Uytven, historian (died 2018)
- 29 April — Mark Eyskens, politician
- 4 June — Godfried Danneels, bishop (died 2019)
- 8 August – Myriam Sarachik, experimental physicist (died 2021)
- 2 October – Michel Van Aerde, cyclist (died 2020)
- 17 October — Jeanine Deckers, singer (died 1985)

== Deaths ==
- 15 July — Léon de Witte de Haelen (born 1857), army officer
- 19 July – Jacques Forget (born 1852), priest and scholar
