= Audience analysis =

Audience analysis is a task that is often performed by technical writers in a project's early stages. It consists of assessing the audience to ensure that the information provided to them is at the appropriate level. The audience is often referred to as the end-user, and all communications need to be targeted towards the defined audience. Defining an audience requires considering many factors, including age, culture, and knowledge of the subject. After considering all the known factors, a profile of the intended audience can be created, allowing writers to write in a manner that is understood by the intended audience.

== Process ==
Audience analysis involves gathering and interpreting information about the recipients of oral, written, or visual communication.

There are numerous methods that a technical communicator can use to conduct the analysis. Because the task of completing an audience analysis can be overwhelming, using a multi-pronged approach to conduct the analysis is recommended by most professionals, often yielding improved accuracy and efficiency. Michael Albers suggests that an analysis use several independent strategies that work together, such as reader knowledge of the topic and reader cognitive comprehension.

Writers can also use conversations, in-depth interviews or focus groups to help them to complete an audience analysis. Conversation as well as other qualitative research techniques will allow the communicator to consider the multiple cultural, disciplinary, and institutional contexts of their target audience, producing a valuable audience analysis.

David L. Carson of the Rensselaer Polytechnic Institute asserted that technical communicators most often perform their jobs with little or no knowledge about their audience. Carson states that the analysis should include a reader's level of comprehension of the technical vocabulary and motivation, as well as reading level. Indicators of a reader's high level of motivation include high interest in the subject matter, relatively high knowledge of the content, and high personal stakes in mastering the information.

Another technique used to conduct an audience analysis is the "bottom-up" approach. Leon de Stadler and Sarah van der Land explore this type of approach in reference to a document produced by an organization that develops different kinds of interventions in the field of HIV/AIDS education. This document focused on the use of contraception and targeted the black youth in South Africa. The initial document was created by document designers in the United States who did not base their design on an extensive audience analysis. As a result, the document, which used the informal slang of black South African youth, did not effectively communicate with its target audience. After the dissemination of the document, Van der Land used focus groups and interviews of a sample of the target audience to discover what improvements should be made. Upon considering the audience's perspective, she found that the initial document's use of hip-style language backfired. The interviewees indicated that the use of the popular language was ineffective because it was used incorrectly or inconsistently throughout the document. Additionally, to the target audience, the informal language did not fit the seriousness of the topic being discussed. The suggested "bottom-up" approach should have incorporated the target audience during the design process instead of as an afterthought.

Marjorie Rush Hovde offers additional tactics for conducting an audience analysis in relation to one's organization. She suggests talking with users during phone support calls, interacting with users face-to-face, drawing on the writer's own experiences with the software and documentation, interacting with people within the organization, studying responses sent from users after the documentation is released, and conducting internal user testing. Like Michael Albers, Hovde asserts that the use of a combination of tactics produces a more accurate audience analysis than using one tactic alone.

Karen D. Holl discusses what writers should consider when writing papers that address an international audience. She focuses on those writers who attempt to publish studies in publications that are circulated abroad. She suggests that these writers consider the following questions when framing their papers:

- What conclusions from my study would be relevant and novel to land managers and scientists working in other ecosystems and socio-economic contexts?
- What is the geographic scope of the literature I am citing?
- To which ecological and socio-economic systems do my world view and results apply?
- Is my study sufficiently well replicated to generalize my results?
- Are my conclusions supported by my data and, conversely, are all my data necessary to support my conclusions?

Although she focuses her suggestions on scientific studies, she acknowledges that "what is critical to effectively communicate the results of any study is to consider what conclusions will be of most interest to the target audience." Holl concludes that knowing how to address an international audience is a vital skill that successful scientists, as well as technical communicators, must possess.

== Depth of analysis ==
There are often a large number of factors to consider, thus making it hard for the writer to completely assess the target audience within a reasonable amount of time. Therefore, reaching the most accurate and effective audience analysis in a timely manner is vital to the technical communication process. The depth of the audience analysis also depends on the size of the intended audience.

Because people constantly change in terms of technological exposure, the audience being analyzed also changes. As a result, the technical communicator must consider the possibility that their audience changes over time. An article in the European Journal of Communication examined the changes experienced by audience research due to the growing range of information and communication technologies. The article pointed out that there are three main challenges that drive the search for methodological rigor: the difference between what people say they do and what they do in practice, the interpretation of the text by the reader, and why the received meanings of television matter in everyday life. An absolutely perfect audience analysis is generally impossible to create, and it is similarly difficult to create an analysis that is relevant for a long period of time. Revising and rewriting an audience analysis is often required in order to maintain the relevance of the analysis.

=== Specific applications of audience analysis ===
R. C. Goldworthy, C. B. Mayhorn and A. W. Meade dealt with hazard mitigation, including warning development, validation, and dissemination, as an important aspect of product safety and workplace and consumer protection in their article "Warnings in Manufacturing: Improving Hazard-Mitigation Messaging through Audience Analysis." In this study, they focused on the potential role of latent class analysis in regard to the audience analysis performed in hazard communication and warning messages. Their qualitative study involved 700 adult and adolescent participants who answered a structured questionnaire about prescription medication history and behaviors. The identification of latent classes based on behaviors of interest facilitated tailoring hazard-mitigation efforts to specific groups. Although their study is limited, in that all participants were between the ages of 12 and 44 and were from heavily populated urban areas (so the generalizability of the data to rural settings has not been generated), this study establishes that latent class analysis can play a vital role. They conclude that latent analysis is a worthwhile addition to the analytical toolbox because it allows, in this case, risk reduction and hazard-mitigation efforts to tailor interventions to a diverse target audience. For the technical writer, analyzing latent classes would enable them to better identify homogeneous groups within the broader population of readers and across many variables to tailor messages to these better-specified groups.

The population of older adults is growing, and Gail Lippincott asserts that technical communicators have not accounted for the needs of these audiences nor drawn from the wide range of research on aging. In her article "Gray Matters: Where are the Technical Communicator in Research and Design for Aging Audiences?" Lippincott suggests four challenges that practitioners, educators, and researchers must undertake to accommodate older adults' physical, cognitive, and emotional needs: They must refine the demographic variable of age, operationalize age to enrich current methods of audience analysis, investigate multidisciplinary sources of aging research, and participate in research on aging by offering our expertise in document design and communication strategies. Lippincott acknowledges that there is so much more research that must be done in this area, for "the body of literature on older adults and computer use is relatively small." Lippincott provides insight into an often overlooked audience that technical communicators must learn to address.

Teresa Lipus argues that devoting company resources to produce adequate instructions for international users is both practical and ethical. She also provides a brief overview of the consumer protection measures that leading U.S. trade partners have implemented. She also presents the following guidelines for developing adequate instructions for international audiences:

1. Define the scope of the instructions
2. Identify the audience
3. Describe the product's functions and limitations
4. Identify the constraints
5. Use durable materials

She offers tips for getting and keeping the attention of the audience:

1. Organize the information
2. Structure the information
3. Design the page layout

To aid the readers' comprehension, Lipus suggests that technical communicators write readable texts and design effective graphics. To motivate compliance, she recommended making the instructions relevant and credible and improving information recall by organizing the information into small meaningful groups and providing concise summaries and on-product reminders. When presenting safety information, Lipus says to not only include the necessary safety messages but also to design effective safety messages. Before distributing instructions, they must be evaluated. She recommends testing the product and the accuracy of the instructions, communicating using means that reach users, and continuing to test and to inform users even after marketing. She explains that because the potential for making subtle but offensive errors is so high in international dealings, a language-sensitive native speaker from the target culture should always review the instructions before they are distributed to consumers. Although Lipus provides information in analyzing and writing for an international audience regarding consumer protection, the strategies offered can be applied to document preparation in general.

Jenni Swenson, Helen Constantinides, and Laura Gurak, in their case study, address the problem of defining medical web site credibility and identifying the gap in web design research that fails to recognize or address specific audience needs in web site design. The information they gathered assisted the researchers in identifying and fulfilling specific audience needs, describing a framework, and presenting a case study in audience-driven Web design. The researchers used the qualitative method of conducting a survey to find the audience for the Algenix, Inc. Web site. Algenix is a company that manages biomedical liver disease. The study indicated that an audience-driven design would do more to reassure the audience that personal information would not be collected without consent as well as provide clear policies of security, privacy, and data collection. The survey informed the researchers that the audience would also like to experience a site with minimal graphics and short download times and one that is intuitive and easy to navigate. This study illustrates how an audience analysis should not only address what the users are able to do but also what they, as the users, would prefer.

In the article "Real Readers, Implied Readers, and Professional Writers: Suggested Research," Charlotte Thralls, Nancy Ror, and Helen Rothschild Ewald of Iowa State University define "real readers" versus "implied readers." The real reader is a concrete reality that determines the writer's purpose and persona. A writer who perceives an audience as real tends to conceive of readers as living individuals with specific attitudes and demographic characteristics. Therefore, the writer's task is to accommodate the real reader by analyzing this reader's needs and deferring to them. The implied reader, on the other hand, is a mental construct or role that the actual reader is invited to enter, even though the characteristics embodied in that role may not perfectly fit his or her attitudes or reactions. When the reader is implied, the writer invents and determines the audience within the text. The researchers assert that writers must appreciate the complex interplay that may take place between the real and implied representations of the reader in every document. The researchers discuss how their study was conducted for the sole purpose of developing a hypothesis for further study: Are professional writers aware of real and implied readers; does a writer's way of perceiving a reader affect contextual development; do shifts occur in writers' conceptions of readers; are writers' perceptions of readers linked to a sense of genre and explained by principles of cognitive processing? In modern communication settings, audience analysis increasingly encompasses the examination of digital behaviors, including social media usage, online communities, and media consumption patterns. Understanding how audiences interact with digital platforms helps communicators tailor messages more effectively and anticipate how messages may spread or be interpreted in networked environments.

== See also ==
- Technical communication tools
- Technical writing
