= Parves-et-Nattages =

Commune in Auvergne-Rhône-Alpes, France

- Commune
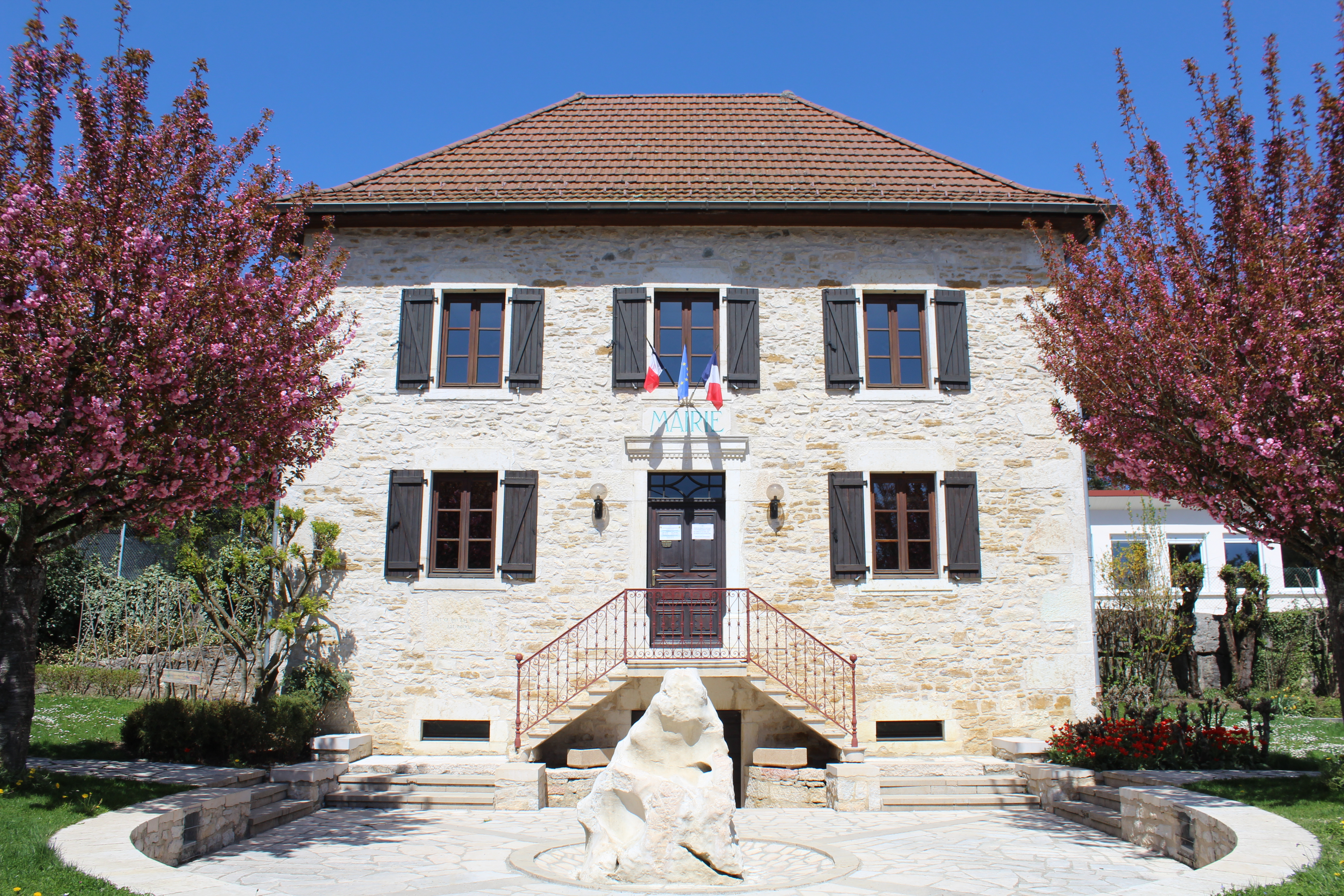
- Town hall
- Location of Parves-et-Nattages
- Location within France Location within Auvergne-Rhône-Alpes
- Coordinates: 45°44′35″N 5°44′31″E
- Country: France
- Region: Auvergne-Rhône-Alpes
- Department: Ain
- Arrondissement: Belley
- Canton: Belley

Government
  - Mayor (2026–32): Michel Faquin
- Area^{1}: 15.86 km^{2} (6.12 sq mi)
- Population (2023): 962
  - Density: 60.7/km^{2} (157/sq mi)
- Time zone: UTC+01:00 (CET)
  - Summer (DST): UTC+02:00 (CEST)
- INSEE/Postal code: 01286 /01300
- ^{1} French Land Register data, which excludes lakes, ponds, glaciers > 1 km^{2} (0.386 sq mi or 247 acres) and river estuaries.

Parves-et-Nattages (French pronunciation: [paʁv e nataʒ]) is a commune in the Ain department of eastern France. The municipality was established on 1 January 2016 and consists of the former communes of Parves and Nattages.

== See also ==
- Communes of the Ain department
