= Els De Bens =

Belgian communication scientist and professor

- Born: 22 February 1940; Antwerp, Belgium
- Died: 1 December 2025 (aged 85)
- Education: Ghent University
- Scientific career
- Fields: media studies (history of journalism)
- Institutions: Ghent University
- Thesis: De gecensureerde informatiepers in België tijdens de Duitse bezetting (1940-1944) (1973)
- Doctoral advisor: Theo Luykx
- Notable students: Freya Van den Bossche
- Website: https://archit.ugent.be/detail.php?id=4962525

Els De Bens (1940–2025) was a Belgian communication scientist with a particular interest in the history of the printed news media. She was one of the founders of media studies as an academic discipline in Belgium.

== Career ==
De Bens was born in Antwerp on 22 February 1940. She studied Germanic Philology and Communication Science at Ghent University, obtaining her doctorate in 1973 with a thesis on newspaper censorship under the German occupation of Belgium during World War II. She went on to teach at Ghent University, becoming "one of the foundational figures of modern media studies in Flanders". She gradually widened her research interests to include audiovisual media, and lectured on American influence and the commercialisation of European media, coining the term "Dallasification". She co-authored the report of the European Commission's Directorate General for Science, Research and Development, Impact of New Communication Technologies on Media Industry in the EC Countries (1987).

In 1992 De Bens was one of the founders of Ghent University's Faculty of Political and Social Sciences, within which a new Department of Communication Sciences was established. She was the first head of department (1992–1997) before becoming dean of the faculty (1997–2000). In 2004 she established a research group on Media, Innovation and Contemporary Technologies. This would become an interdisciplinary collaboration between the Faculty of Political and Social Sciences and the Faculty of Engineering Sciences and Architecture. De Bens became emeritus in 2005, but continued to participate in research. She was a co-editor of the European Journal of Communication and a member of the Euromedia Research Group.

Besides her academic work, she served as chair of the Vlaamse Mediaraad ("Flemish Media Council"), an official advisory body for the Flemish Government's media policy, and took part in television debates about contemporary issues.

She died on 1 December 2025, at the age of 85.

== Publications ==
- Televisie in Vlaanderen: Steeds meer pulp, Ons Erfdeel, 33 (1990), pp. 653-657.
- De pers in België. Het verhaal van de Belgische dagbladpers: Gisteren, vandaag en morgen (1997; further editions 2001, 2007, 2010)
