= 1932 in Belgium =

- Decades: 1910s; 1920s; 1930s; 1940s; 1950s
- See also: Other events of 1932; List of years in Belgium

Events of the year 1932 in Belgium.

== Incumbents ==
Albert I in conversation with Albert Einstein, August 1932

Monarch

- Albert I

Prime Minister

- Jules Renkin (to 22 October)
- Charles de Broqueville (from 22 October)

== Events ==
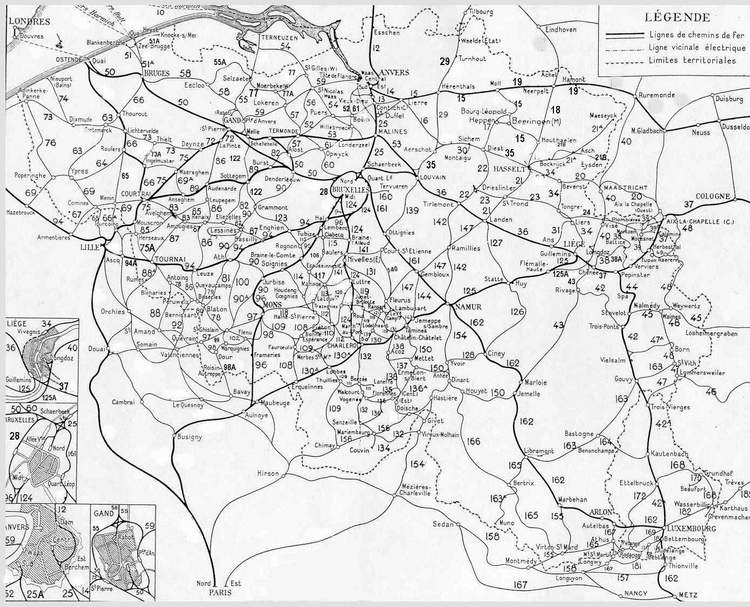
A map of the Belgian rail network (1932)

- 27 June to 10 September – Ten weeks of strikes in the Borinage to protest against economic conditions.
- 9 October – Municipal elections
- 18 October – Jules Renkin offers his resignation as prime minister
- 27 November – Legislative election returns Catholic Party majority
- 4 December – Provincial elections

== Publications ==
- Franz Hellens, Poésie de la veille et du lendemain
- Hergé, Tintin en Amérique (serialised 1931–1932) published as an album

== Art and architecture ==
Paintings

- René Magritte, The Universe Unmasked

Cinema

- La Nuit du Carrefour (France), Jean Renoir's adaptation of Georges Simenon's La Nuit du carrefour (1931)

== Business ==
- Lotus Bakeries established

== Births ==
- 17 January – Roger Lallemand, politician (died 2016)
- 11 March – Piet Van Brabant, journalist (died 2006)
- 18 March – Arthur Luysterman, bishop of Ghent
- 23 March – Bettina Le Beau, actress (died 2015)
- 31 March – Jean-Pierre Grafé, politician (died 2019)
- 29 June – Evrard Godefroid, cyclist (died 2013)
- 4 July – Aurèle Vandendriessche, marathon runner
- 20 August – Claude Wallet, Olympic fencer (died 2021)
- 27 August – François Glorieux, musician (died 2023)
- 4 October – Étienne Davignon, politician
- 6 November – François Englert, theoretical physicist
- 23 November – Solange Berry, singer
- 16 December – Karel Oomen, wrestler
- 20 December – Carla Walschap, writer and teacher

== Deaths ==
- 17 February – Fredegand Cogels (born 1850), politician
- 10 April – Jean-François Heymans (born 1859), pharmacologist
- 19 April – Edgard Colle (born 1897), chess master
- 24 June – Guy Reyntiens (born 1880), Olympic equestrian
- 25 July – Cyriel Buysse (born 1859), playwright
- 20 August – Émile Mathieu (born 1844), composer
- 27 August – Ursmer Berlière (born 1861), monastic historian
- 29 September – Émile van Ermengem (born 1851), bacteriologist
- 7 October – Eugène Broerman (born 1861), painter
- 28 October – Joseph Dejardin (born 1873), trade unionist
