= 1931 in Belgium =

- Decades: 1910s; 1920s; 1930s; 1940s; 1950s
- See also: Other events of 1931; List of years in Belgium

Events in the year 1931 in Belgium.

== Incumbents ==
Monarch – Albert I
Prime Minister – Henri Jaspar (to 6 June); Jules Renkin (from 6 June)

== Events ==
- 12 July – William Grover-Williams and Caberto Conelli win the 1931 Belgian Grand Prix at Spa-Francorchamps

== Publications ==
- Le Journal des Poètes begins publication.

== Art and architecture ==
Buildings

- Boerentoren, Antwerp, completed

== Births ==
- 5 September – Rik Boel, judge (died 2020)

== Deaths ==
- 12 May – Eugène Ysaÿe (born 1858), violinist
