= Parves =

Commune in Ain, France

- Part of Parves-et-Nattages
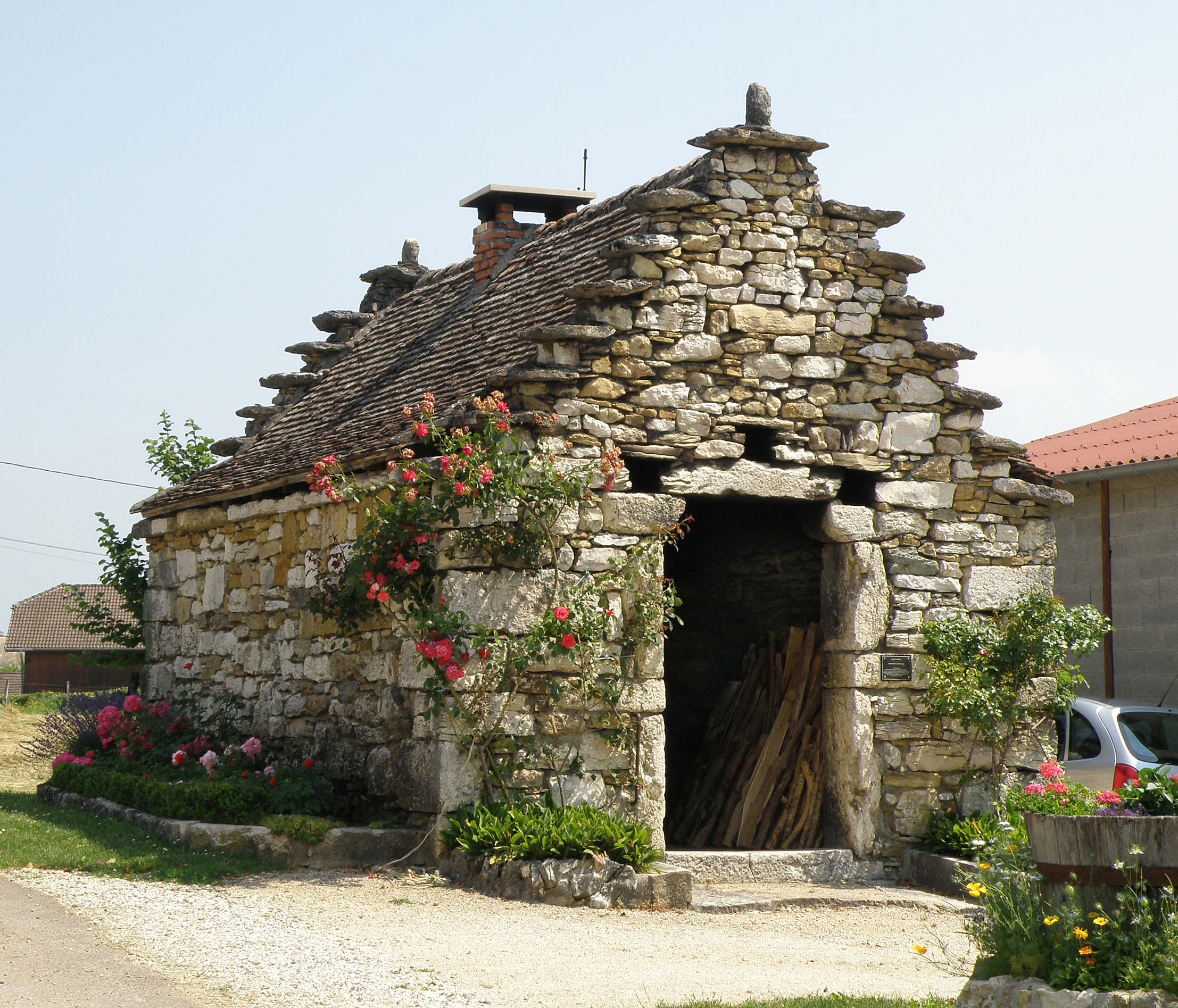
- Location of Parves
- Location within France Location within Auvergne-Rhône-Alpes
- Coordinates: 45°44′42″N 5°44′24″E
- Country: France
- Region: Auvergne-Rhône-Alpes
- Department: Ain
- Arrondissement: Belley
- Canton: Belley
- Commune: Parves-et-Nattages
- Area^{1}: 5.53 km^{2} (2.14 sq mi)
- Elevation: 500 m (1,600 ft)
- Highest elevation: 623 m (2,044 ft)
- Lowest elevation: 240 m (790 ft)
- Population (2022): 356
  - Density: 64.4/km^{2} (167/sq mi)
- Time zone: UTC+01:00 (CET)
  - Summer (DST): UTC+02:00 (CEST)
- Postal code: 01300
- ^{1} French Land Register data, which excludes lakes, ponds, glaciers > 1 km^{2} (0.386 sq mi or 247 acres) and river estuaries.

Parves (French pronunciation: [paʁv]) is a former commune in the Ain department in eastern France. On 1 January 2016, it was merged into the new commune Parves-et-Nattages.

== Population ==
Historical population
Year	Pop.	±% p.a.
2006	333	—
2011	363	+1.74%
2022	356	−0.18%
Source: INSEE

== See also ==
- Communes of the Ain department
