= 1938 in Belgium =

- Decades: 1910s; 1920s; 1930s; 1940s; 1950s
- See also: Other events of 1938; List of years in Belgium

Events in the year 1938 in Belgium.

== Incumbents ==
Monarch – Leopold III
Prime Minister – Paul-Émile Janson (to 15 May); Paul-Henri Spaak (from 15 May)

== Events ==
- 12 March – Henri de Man resigns as finance minister after his fiscal proposals are rejected.
- 13 May – Paul-Émile Janson's governing coalition falls apart.
- 15 May – Paul-Henri Spaak forms a government of national unity.
- 9 October – Municipal elections
- 11 September – 26th Gordon Bennett Cup held in Liège.

== Publications ==
- Willem Elsschot, Het Been
- Marius Valkhoff, Philologie et littérature wallonnes (Gronginen and Batavia, J. B. Wolters)

== Art and architecture ==
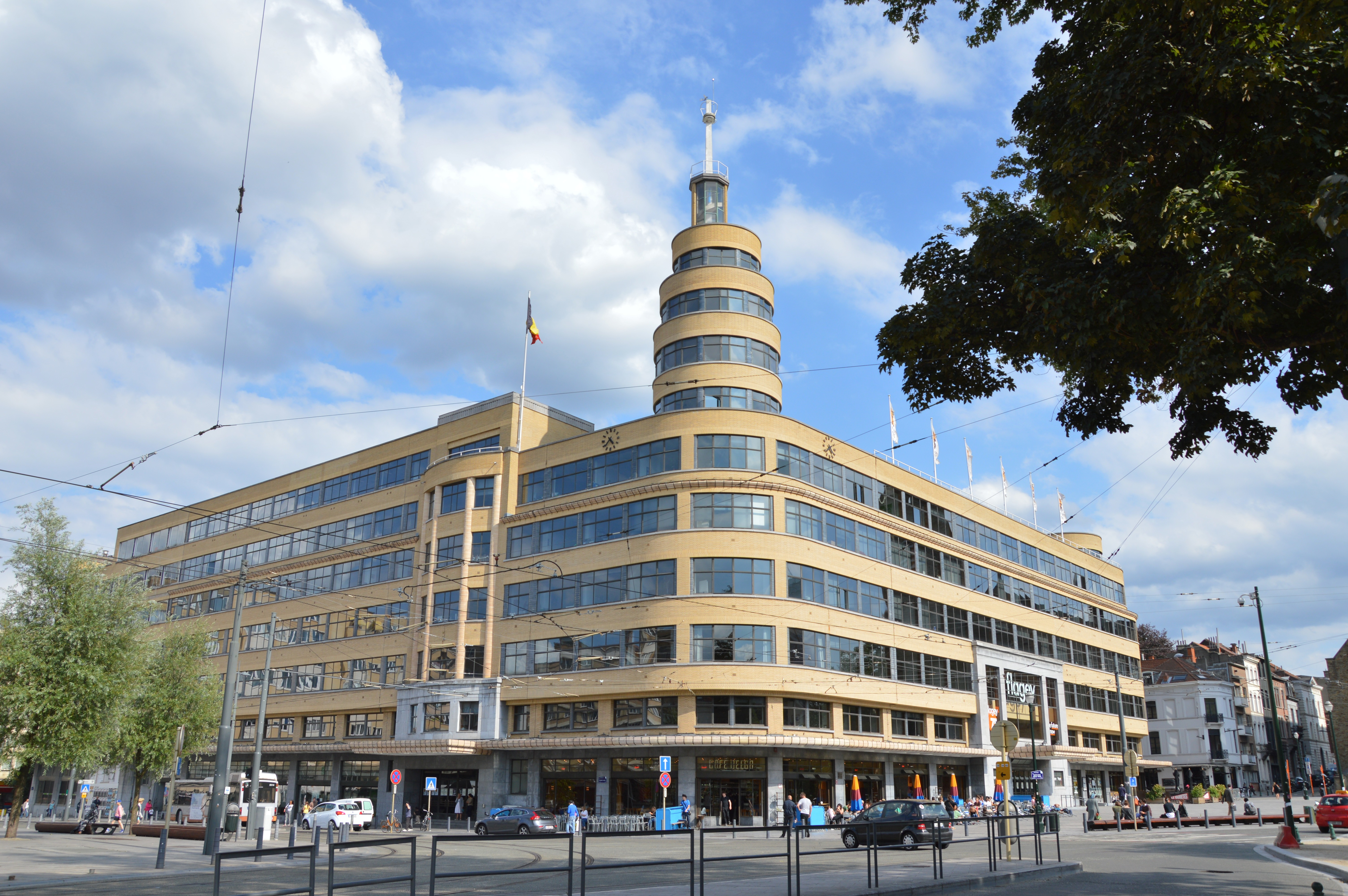
Flagey Building in Brussels

Buildings

- Art Deco Flagey Building in Brussels completed.

Paintings

- René Magritte, La Durée poignardée

== Births ==
- 3 April – Gérard Sulon, footballer (died 2020)

== Deaths ==
- 14 July – Charles Liebrechts (born 1858), explorer
- 27 December – Emile Vandervelde (born 1866), politician
