= Thierry de Gruben =

Belgian diplomat

Baron Thierry de Gruben (born 17 November 1941) is the former Ambassador from the Kingdom of Belgium to the United Kingdom.

He joined the Belgian diplomatic service in 1969 after studying law at the University of Leuven, being assigned to the NATO headquarters in Brussels, and then to the press department of the Ministry of Foreign Affairs. From 1971 to 1976 he was posted to Moscow, then from 1976 to 1980 to London, where he rose to the rank of First Secretary. From 1980 to 1982 he was consul-general in Bombay; after a few years in Brussels as an assistant to the Minister of Foreign Affairs, he took up his first ambassadorial post in 1985, becoming the Ambassador to Poland. He moved to Moscow in 1990, becoming the Ambassador to the Soviet Union and then to the Russian Federation. In 1995 he left this post to become Special Envoy for Eastern Slavonia during its reintegration into Croatia, leaving in 1997. From 1997 to 2002 he was the Ambassador and Permanent Representative of Belgium to NATO, and in 2002 became the Ambassador to the Court of St. James's. He retired in 2006.
