= Jean Herbiet =

Jean Herbiet (born December 16, 1930, in Namur, Belgium), moved to Ottawa, Canada, in 1958 after completing studies in administration at the Institut Polytechnique and in theatre at the Institut belge du théâtre in Brussels.

Between 1971 and 1981, Herbiet held the position of artistic director of the French Theatre at the National Arts Centre, where he opened a series of production programs, cultural exchanges and tours that brought shows overseas to and from Europe. Herbiet is best remembered as the director of two famous productions created in collaboration with the brilliant puppeteer Félix Mirbt: Büchner's Woyzeck (1974) and Strindberg's A Dream Play (1977). Throughout his tenure, Herbiet expanded the scope of theatre by exploring the new possibilities offered by the National Arts Centre Studio, Canada's first fully flexible performance space. His bold experiments in this area have had a lasting influence on Canadian theatrical practice.

In 1981, he was appointed general director of the Canadian Cultural Centre in Paris for a four-year term. After returning to Ottawa in 1985, Herbiet returned to his specialities: directing theatre and teaching at the University of Ottawa. He also wrote the scripts for bilingual documentary vignettes presented by the Canadian Museum of Civilization, and the Parliament of Canada.

His publications include the eight historical one-act plays Huit promenades sur les plaines d'Abraham, the short stories Le Vieil Arbre et l'Alouette and Ti-Jean-Jean et le Soleil and the play La Rose Rôtie.

Herbiet died on March 31, 2008.
