= Georges Ista =

Belgian writer

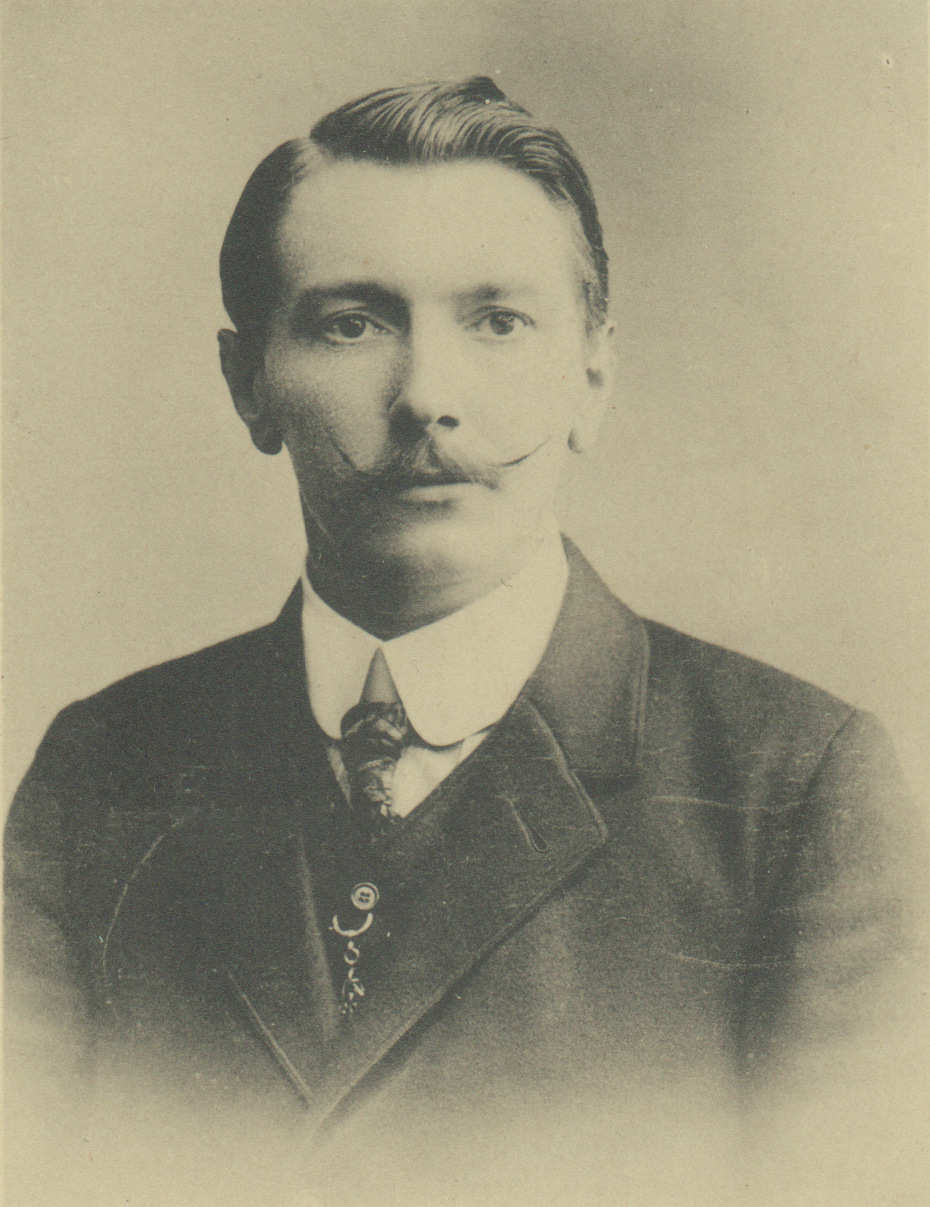
- Georges Ista circa 1900
- Born: 12 November 1874; Liège, Belgium
- Died: 6 January 1939 (aged 64); Paris, France

Georges Ista (12 November 1874 – 6 January 1939) was a Belgian writer known for his work in the Walloon language. A native of Liège, he died in Paris. He wrote a number of plays.

== Works ==
- Ista, Georges (1917). La ligne droite. Bénard. OCLC 609966411.
