= Le Bourgmestre de Furnes =

- Author: Georges Simenon
- Language: French
- Publication date: 1939
- Publication place: Belgium

Le Bourgmestre de Furnes is a Belgian novel by Georges Simenon. It was first published in 1939.
