= Serdu =

Belgian cartoonist and illustrator (1940–2025)

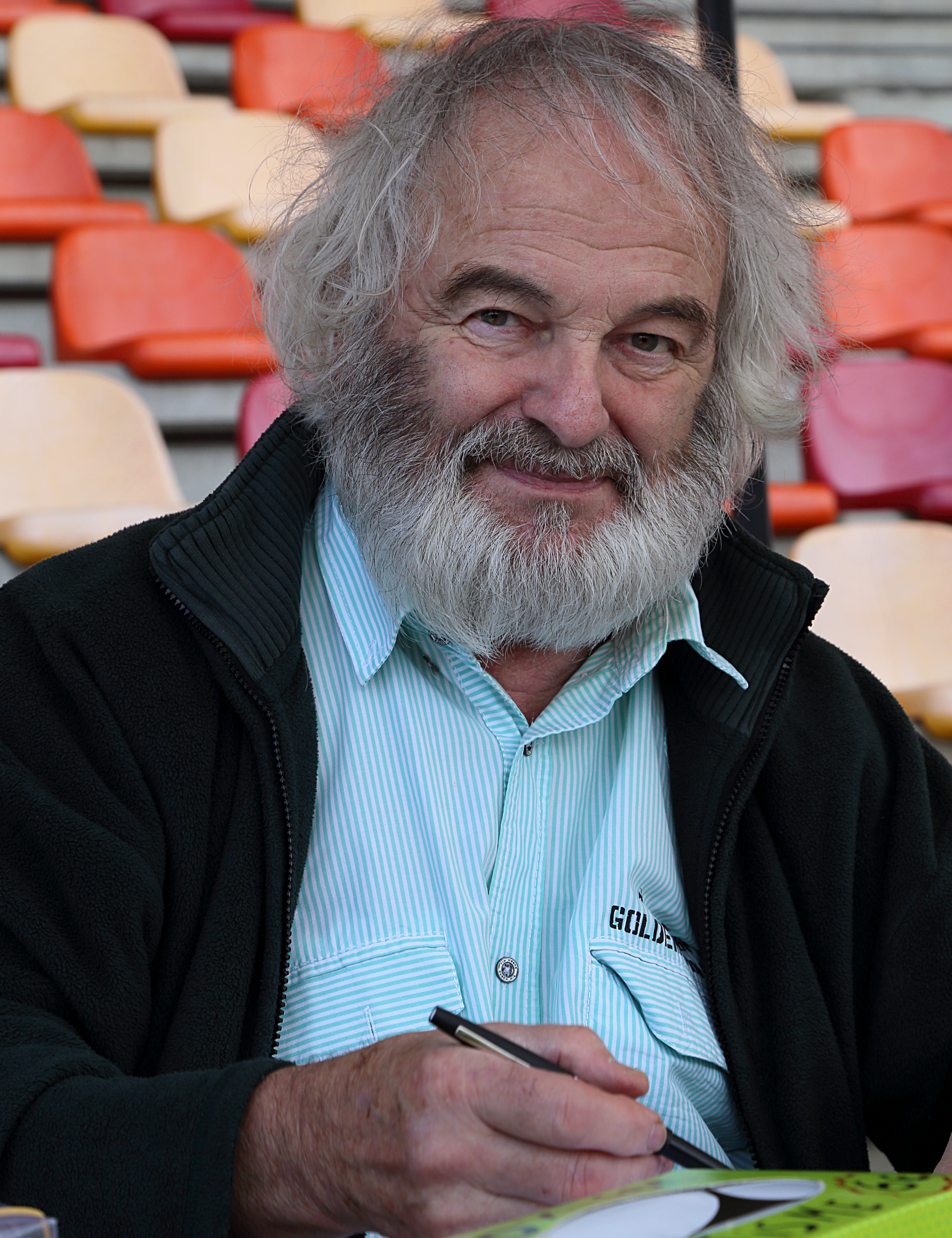
- Serdu in 2015
- Born: Serge Duhayon; 18 January 1940; La Glanerie, Rumes, Belgium
- Died: 21 September 2025 (aged 85)
- Occupation: Cartoonist; illustrator

Serge Duhayon (18 January 1940 – 21 September 2025), best known by his pseudonym Serdu, was a Belgian cartoonist and illustrator. He was best known for his comic gags in the weekly Franco-Belgian comic magazine Spirou.

Duhayon died on 21 September 2025, at the age of 85.
