= Johan Weyts =

Belgian lawyer and politician (1939–2021)

Johan Weyts (9 June 1939 – 20 May 2021) was a Belgian Christian Democrat politician who sat in the Belgian Senate from 1987 to 1999.

Born in Mechelen, Weyts had a doctorate in law from Ghent University. He was a member of Bruges city council from 1971 to 1995, when he was first elected to the senate for the Arrondissement of Bruges. His parliamentary questions mostly related to finance, transport and fisheries. He was also a member of the Vlaamse Raad from 1988, and sat in the Flemish Parliament from 1999 to 2004.

In 1999 he risked expulsion from his party for supporting far-right positions of Vlaams Blok, and in 2004 there were renewed calls for his expulsion when it emerged he was vice-chair of a committee to prevent "foreigners" from voting that had been set up by Vlaams Blok.
