= François van Hoobrouck d'Aspre =

Belgian politician (1934–2020)

Burgomaster of Wezembeek-Oppem
- In office 1994–2006

Personal details
- Born: 21 January 1934 Brussels, Belgium
- Died: 19 August 2020 (aged 86)
- Party: MR

François van Hoobrouck d'Aspre (21 January 1934 – 19 August 2020) was a Belgian politician and baron. He was a popular figure in the Union des Francophones of the electoral district of Brussels-Halle-Vilvoorde, and served as Burgomaster of Wezembeek-Oppem from 1994 to 2006.

== Biography ==
Van Hoobrouck d'Aspre was active defending local residents from aircraft noise pollution alongside the Union Belge Contre les Nuisances des Avions, which he had founded. He was also a Provincial Councillor in Flemish Brabant.

In 2006, he participated in the fictional documentary Bye Bye Belgium, which was based on the Flemish Secession hoax of 2006. It was aired by RTBF.

Van Hoobrouck d'Aspre served the French-speaking residents of Brussels and was a Deputy Senator from 2007 until his death. He was a member of the Mouvement Réformateur until 17 January 2014, when he joined DéFI.

François van Hoobrouck d'Aspre died on 19 August 2020 at the age of 86.
