= De Roma =

Cinema in Antwerp, Belgium

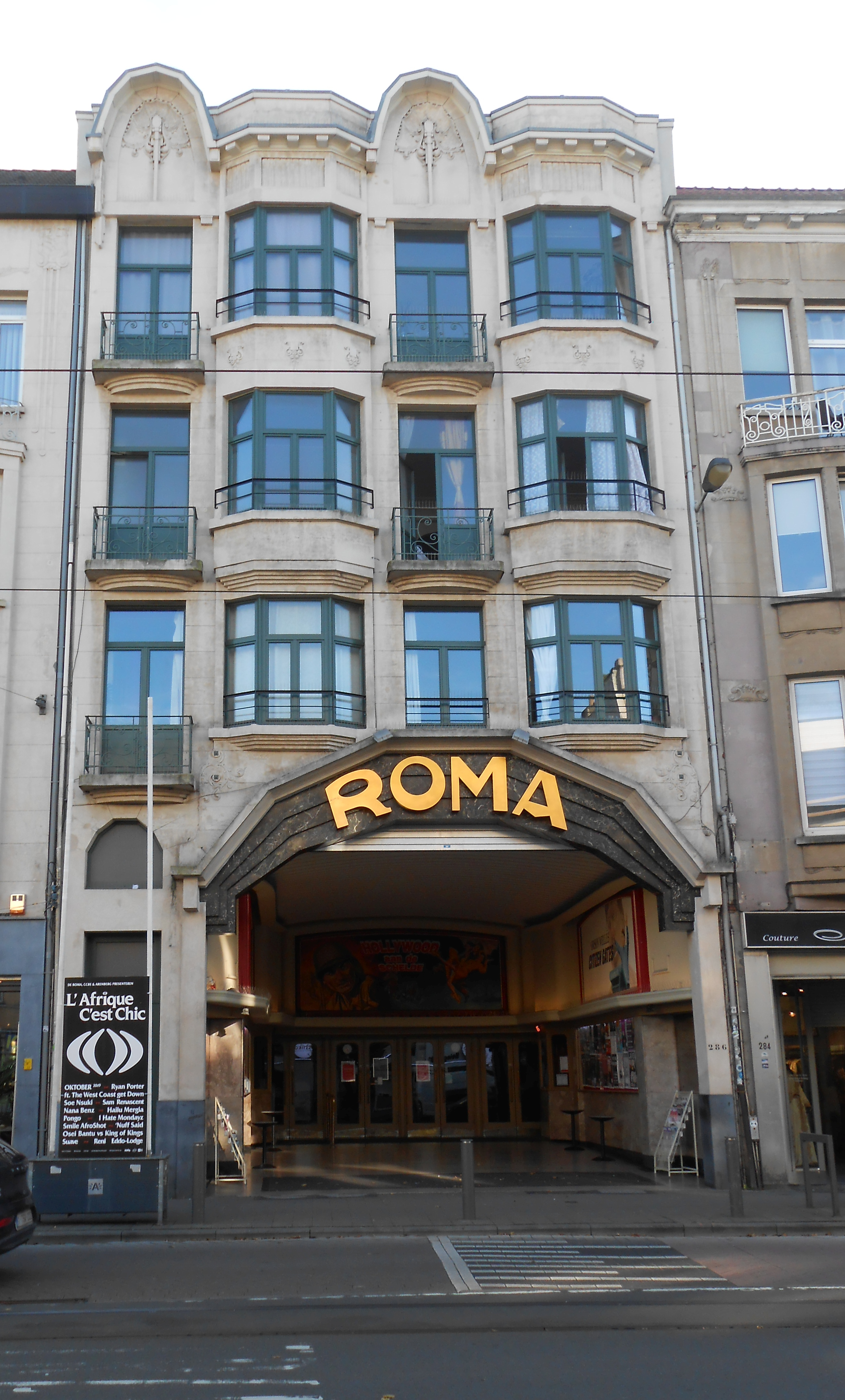
The main entrance at Turnhoutsebaan 286, Borgerhout

De Roma, originally Kinema Roma, is an Art Deco cultural centre and performance venue in Borgerhout, Antwerp (Belgium).

== History ==
The building, designed by Alphonse Pauwels, was originally constructed in 1927 as a 2,000-seat cinema (the largest in Antwerp) with flats above. The main entrance was remodelled in 1958 by the architect Rie Haan. De Roma became a popular music venue in the 1970s, with big names from Britain and America performing there on European tours, but closed in 1982.

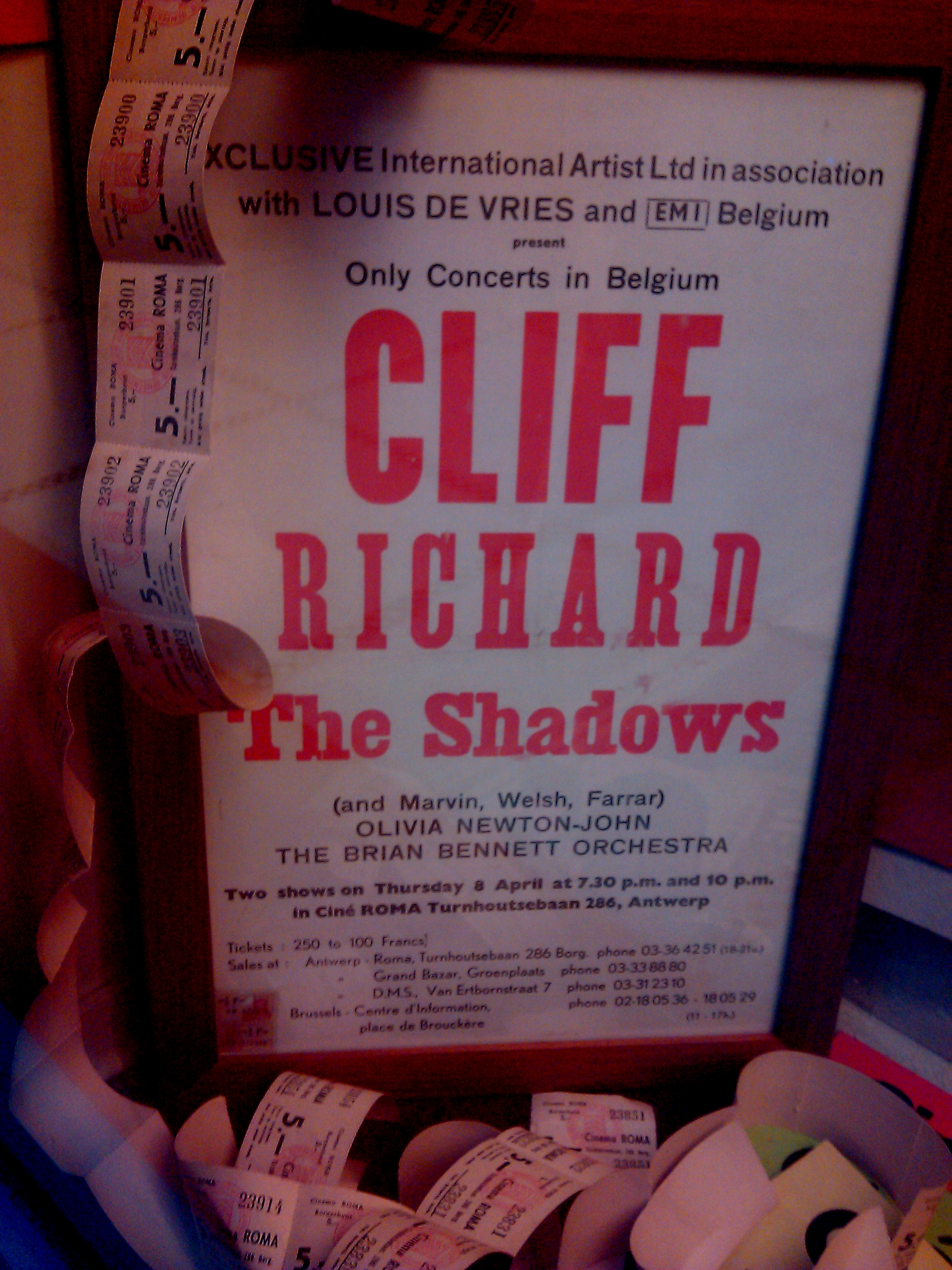
A poster for two 1971 performances in De Roma by Cliff Richard and The Shadows supported by Olivia Newton-John

The building was classified as a monument in 2002 and reopened as a cultural centre and performance venue on 15 May 2003 after initial restoration by volunteers. It was closed for three months in the summer of 2015 for further renovations which cost 2.8 million euros, financed by the region, the city, the district and a non-profit foundation, and were carried out with the aid of 400 volunteers. In 2016 the restoration was awarded the first annual prize for built heritage.
