= Édouard Close =

Belgian politician (1929–2017)

Mayor of Liège
- In office 1976–1990
- Preceded by: Charles Bailly
- Succeeded by: Henri Schlitz

Interior Minister of Belgium
- In office 26 January 1973 – 23 April 1974
- Preceded by: Renaat Van Elslande
- Succeeded by: Charles Hanin

Personal details
- Born: Édouard Nicolas Henri Charles Close; 8 July 1929 Verviers, Liège, Belgium
- Died: 2 March 2017 (aged 87) Liège, Belgium
- Party: Socialist Party
- Other political affiliations: Belgian Socialist Party

Édouard Nicolas Henri Charles Close (8 July 1929 – 2 March 2017) was a Belgian politician and member of the former Socialist Party (PSB). He served as the mayor of Liège, one of Belgium's largest cities, for thirteen years from 1976 to 1990. Close had also served as the interior minister of Belgium during the first government of Prime Minister Edmond Leburton from 26 January 1973 until 23 April 1974.

== Biography ==
Close trained as a cabinetmaker. From the end of the Second World War onward, he worked as an employee of the Socialist Mutualities, eventually becoming secretary. In that capacity, he conducted studies on social legislation and labour policy. As a militant member of the Belgian Socialist Party (PSB), he served as secretary-general and national chairman of the Socialist Young Guard. During the 1950s, he also worked as an editor for the newspaper La Jeune Garde. From 1965 to 1971, he was chairman of the National Youth Council.

In 1968, he was elected to the Belgian Chamber of Representatives for the arrondissement of Liège. He later served as State Secretary for the Walloon Regional Economy from 1972 to 1973, and subsequently as Minister of the Interior in the first government of Edmond Leburton from 26 January 1973 to 23 April 1974. In the 1974 legislative elections, he was elected to the Belgian Senate.

At the local level, Close entered the municipal council of the City of Liège in 1959. He served as alderman for Public Education from 1971 to 1972, and later as alderman for Social Services and Family Affairs from 1974 to 1976. He subsequently became mayor of Liège.

In 1989, he was confronted with the financial debt crisis of the City of Liège. A drastic reduction in municipal staff followed, resulting in significant administrative disruption. This was compounded by a strike among refuse collectors, during which streets and the square in front of the city hall became covered with garbage. Close requisitioned the Belgian Army to clean the city.

In June 1990, Close was indicted in a financial scandal involving parking meters and municipal real estate. In November of that year, he transferred his official residence to Aubel, effectively relinquishing his position as mayor. In 1991, he was succeeded as mayor by Henri Schlitz. In July 1992, Close was convicted in the case and received a suspended prison sentence of 28 months, bringing his political career to a definitive end.

Close died on 2 March 2017 at the age of 87.
