= Herman Daled =

Belgian art collector and radiologist (1930–2020)

- Born: Herman J. Daled; 12 June 1930; Bruges, Belgium
- Died: 8 November 2020 (aged 90); Ixelles, Belgium
- Occupations: Art Collector; Radiologist

Herman J. Daled (12 June 1930 – 8 November 2020) was a Belgian art collector and radiologist.

== Career ==
Located in Brussels, he specialized in the field of conceptual art. He notably helped to promote the artistic career of Daniel Buren and various other artists through the collection of their works.

In particular, Daled collected art with his wife, Nicole Daled-Verstraeten, in the 1960s. Their collections included works by Jacques Charlier, Richard Long, Marcel Broodthaers, Niele Toroni, On Kawara, Dan Graham, James Lee Byars, Sol LeWitt, and Vito Acconci. In 2011, he sold part of his collection to the Museum of Modern Art.

Daled has several books published, including Rebondissements and Contrat de première cession d’œuvre. He also worked as a radiologist in the field of oncology. He was influenced by Nobel Prize in Physiology or Medicine winner Albert Claude to enter the field of art.

Herman Daled died in Ixelles on 8 November 2020 at the age of 90.

== Works ==
- L'Imagerie du contenu pelvien (1988). (in French) ISBN 9782950288103
- Wiels ! (2003). Brussels: Centrum voor Hedendaagse Kunst 2003. (in Dutch) ISBN 9789076979175
- A bit of matter and a little bit more the Collection and the Archives of Herman and Nicole Daled 1966 - 1978 (2010). Cologne: König. (in English) ISBN 9783865607638
