= Alfons Vansteenwegen =

Fleming theoretician and therapist

- Alfons Vansteenwegen
- Born: July 6, 1941 (age 84); Leuven, Belgium
- Occupation: Communication theorist

Alfons Vansteenwegen (born July 6, 1941) is one of the Flemish leading theoreticians and therapists in communication theory and important inspirator in the field of couple therapy and general psychotherapy.

Alfons Vansteenwegen is a respected authority on couple differentiation, and he has proposed that relationships evolve through three stages: being in love, differentiation, and true partnership. In the falling in love period we see the other in an ideal way and that's because of fusion. Fusion means that we fall together in feelings, but the feelings are not yet the real relationship’.

For couples struggling with low differentiation, Vansteenwegen offers valuable insights and approaches. Couples with low differentiation are usually not equipped to manage differentiation when it is experienced. For example, partners may differ in the way they feel about sex or the intimacy they desire. This can be an example of differentiation. Couples that are not prepared to manage differentiation may experience conflict. However, a couple that is equipped to manage differentiation will experience this as an opportunity for communication and negotiation rather than conflict. As Alfons Vansteenwegen ‘in Psychotherapy, sometimes you see the return of the desire after a good session where they learn new things about each other and where they felt very close in the feelings and experiences they have’.

In addition to his contributions to couple therapy, Vansteenwegen has authored more than 10 books on the subject, which have been translated into numerous languages. One of his best-known works is The Good Enough Couple, which was most recently updated in 2019. He has also authored or co-authored nearly 400 clinical and scientific publications on topics such as marriage, family, and sexuality.
