= Nattages =

Commune in Ain, France

- Part of Parves-et-Nattages
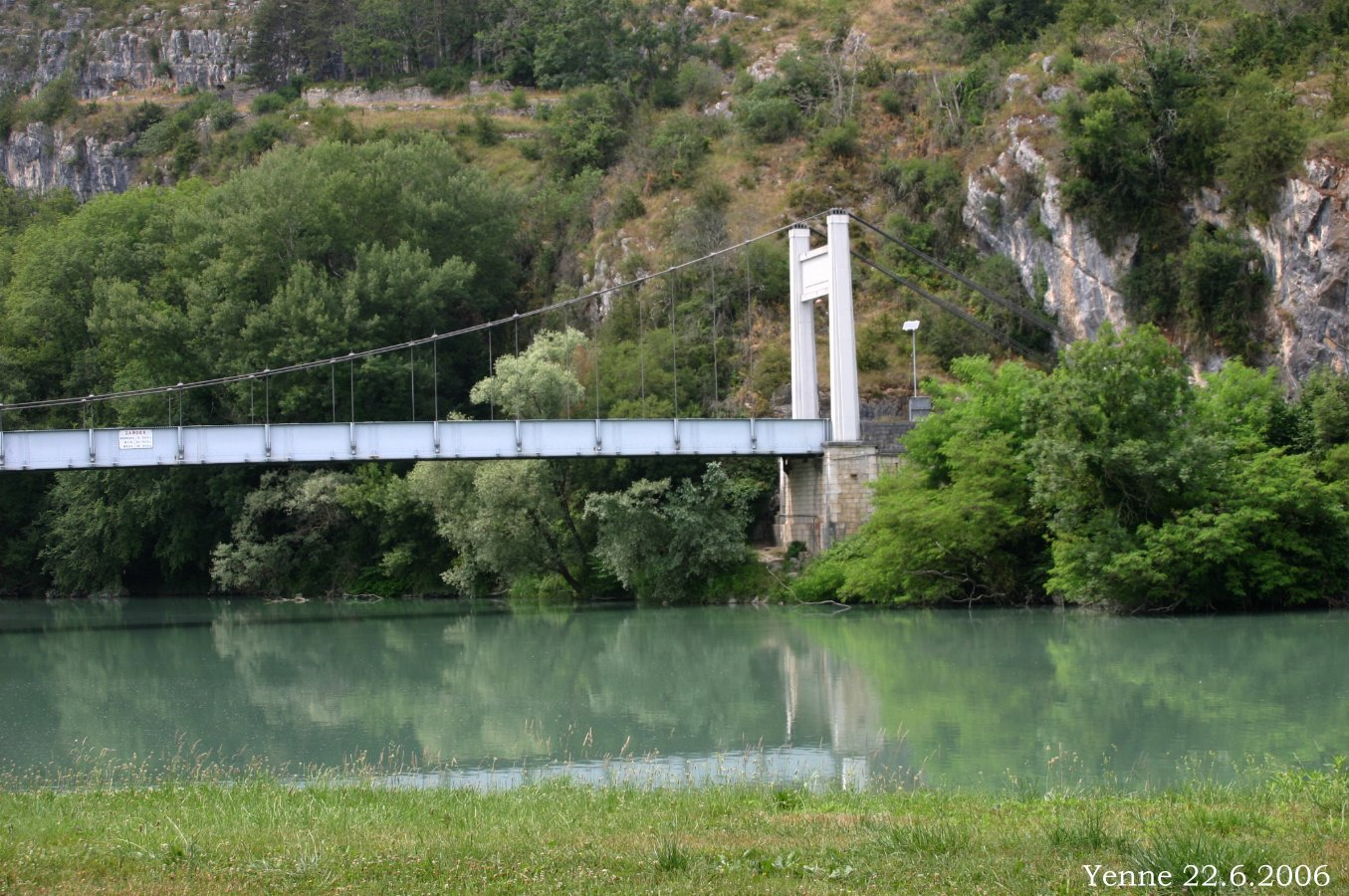
- Suspension bridge over the Rhone
- Location of Nattages
- Location within France Location within Auvergne-Rhône-Alpes
- Coordinates: 45°44′00″N 5°46′00″E
- Country: France
- Region: Auvergne-Rhône-Alpes
- Department: Ain
- Arrondissement: Belley
- Canton: Belley
- Commune: Parves-et-Nattages
- Area^{1}: 10.33 km^{2} (3.99 sq mi)
- Elevation: 310 m (1,020 ft)
- Highest elevation: 663 m (2,175 ft)
- Lowest elevation: 220 m (720 ft)
- Population (2022): 587
  - Density: 56.8/km^{2} (147/sq mi)
- Time zone: UTC+01:00 (CET)
  - Summer (DST): UTC+02:00 (CEST)
- Postal code: 01300
- ^{1} French Land Register data, which excludes lakes, ponds, glaciers > 1 km^{2} (0.386 sq mi or 247 acres) and river estuaries.

Nattages (French pronunciation: [nataʒ]) is a former commune in the Ain department in eastern France. On 1 January 2016, it was merged into the new commune Parves-et-Nattages.

It contains the ruins of the Chateau Montbel, the romanesque chapel of Chemillieu and a church rebuilt in the 17th century.

== Population ==
Historical population
| Year | Pop. | ±% p.a. |
|---|---|---|
| 2006 | 528 | — |
| 2011 | 574 | +1.68% |
| 2022 | 587 | +0.20% |
Source: INSEE

== See also ==
- Communes of the Ain department
