= Procession in Lace =

Painting by Paul Delvaux

- Artist: Paul Delvaux
- Year: 1936
- Medium: Oil on canvas
- Dimensions: 115 cm × 158 cm (45 in × 62 in)
- Location: Sprengel Museum, Hanover

Procession in Lace (French: Le Cortège en dentelles) is a painting executed by the Belgian artist Paul Delvaux in 1936. It shows a group of women walking toward a Roman triumphal arch. It was one of the first paintings in which Delvaux drew inspiration from Giorgio de Chirico and painted women reminiscent of mannequins, something he would continue to do throughout his career. Art historians have highlighted the painting's theatricality and described it as one of Delvaux's first major works.

== Subject and composition ==
A procession of women dressed in white lace garments follow a paved road that leads away from the viewer. Their faces are not seen as they head toward a Roman triumphal arch. In the far distance, another triumphal arch can be seen over the same road. The painting has the dimensions 115 cm × 158 cm (45 in × 62 in) and is painted in oil on canvas. On the bottom right, it is signed and dated "P. DELVAUX / 1-36".

== Analysis and reception ==
Procession in Lace was one of the first of Paul Delvaux's painting to show the influence of Giorgio de Chirico, and it thus set out the direction Delvaux would take for the rest of his career. This involved placing unusual objects side by side and adhering to a poetic logic. Chirico was also a major influence for the surrealists and Delvaux's relationship to this group was complicated. Delvaux said he had become "liberated" by passing through surrealism but that he was not a natural surrealist; the art historian Maurice Debra says "the delightful Procession in Lace" was his "true liberation".

The art historian Virginie Devillers contrasts Procession in Lace with Delvaux's earlier, expressionist paintings, writing that their fairground aesthetics and unelegant women have been replaced by gesturing women reminiscent of wax dolls and mannequins, wearing dresses that could be inspired by fashion magazines or garments belonging by Delvaux's aunts. Devillers calls it Delvaux's "first accomplished staging". The art historian Michel Draguet says Procession in Lace was one of Delvaux's first "major compositions" and interprets the use of classical elements in this and paintings such as The Pink Knots (1937) as expressions of Delvaux's awareness of catastrophic threat in Europe. Draguet says the combination of mystery and theatricality "probably" should be understood as an attempt at "domestication through beauty of a chaos that is pacified through ritual". Nathalia Brodskaïa says the "peaceful, ceremonious moment" depicted in Procession in Lace creates a secret in the painting, despite not containing any action that stands out as special.

== Provenance ==
Since 1972, Procession in Lace belongs to the city of Hanover in Germany, where it is in the collection of the Sprengel Museum. Its German name is Die Spitzenprozession. A study on paper was sold at auction in 2008 for 17,300 GBP.
