= Gaspard Hons =

Belgian poet (1937–2020)

- Born: 3 November 1937; Kelmis, Belgium
- Died: 11 August 2020 (aged 82); Liège, Belgium
- Occupation: Poet

Gaspard Hons (3 November 1937 – 11 August 2020) was a Belgian poet.

== Works ==
- Le Bréviaire de l'attente (1974)
- Cordages d’haleines (1975)
- Maternité. La transhumance (1976)
- Juin, lampe bleue et feu d’épaules (1976)
- Le jour émigre (1977)
- Dix-sept heures (1978)
- Baccarat dans le texte (1979)
- Auberge de taffetas (1979)
- Voir dire (1982)
- Éternuement en ce lieu (1984)
- Fusil posé à l’ombre des chasseurs (1984)
- Éléments pour une demeure (1985)
- Verger peint (1985)
- Mémoire peinte (1985)
- Chemins (1985)
- Or & grès (1988)
- La Maison de personne (1988)
- Le Poème de personne (1988)
- Or et grès (1988)
- Des poèmes très ordinaires (1991)
- Le Livre de personne (1991)
- La Dernière Montagne (1991)
- Offert aux dieux lointains… (1992)
- Le froid n’atteint pas les pommiers en fleur (1992)
- Personne ne précède (1993)
- Un papillon posé sur un livre de Georges Perec (1993)
- Au seul souci de voyager (1994)
- L’Impossible (1994)
- Signe de la main (1995)
- Bleu là-haut (1995)
- Un nom sous ma langue (1995)
- Le Jardin des morts heureux (1996)
- Dans les failles de la lecture et du silence (1997)
- Noli me tangere (1997)
- La Morale des abattoirs (1997)
- L’Orage en deux: une anthologie poétique, 1974-1996 (1998)
- Visage racinéant (1999)
- Avec un livre sous le bras (1999)
- Le Jardin de Cranach: parcours 1979-1990 (2000)
- Schlamm lumineux (2001)
- L’Écart, la Distance (2001)
- Ly’s light (2002)
- Un grand lieu vide sans vaisseaux (2003)
- La Fleur incréée (2004)
- La Merveille du rien (2004)
- Promenade à Rorschach (2005)
- Propos notés en ramassant des aiguilles de pin (2005)
- Les Abeilles de personne (2008)
- Roses improbables (2009)
- L’Esprit du boeuf (2009)
- Petites proses matinales (2012)
- Roses imbrûlées (2013)
- Le Bel Automne (2014)
- Giordano Bruno et autres proses (2014)
- Quand resplendit la fleur inverse (2014)

== Awards ==
- Prix René Gerbault for Auberge de taffetas (1979)
- Prix Claude Ardent for Le Voyage précaire (1985)
- Prix Maurice et Gisèle Gauchez-Philippot for Mémoire peinte (1987)
- Prix de l'Agence de Coopération culturelle et technique for Personne ne précède (1989)
- Prix Froissart for Offert aux dieux lointains (1992)
- Prix Emma Martin for Le Jardin de Cranach (2001)
- Prix Jean Kobs of the Académie royale de langue et de littérature françaises de Belgique for Le Jardin de Cranach (2002)
- Prix Louis Guillaume du poème en prose for Propos notés en ramassant des aiguilles de pin (2006)
- Prix Robert Goffin for Roses improbables (2008)
- Prix Eugène Schmits of the Académie royale de langue et de littérature françaises de Belgique for Les Abeilles de personne (2009)
- Prix Lucien Malpertuis of the Académie royale de langue et de littérature françaises de Belgique for his career works (2009)
