= Paul-Baudouin Michel =

Belgian composer (1930–2020)

- Born: 7 September 1930; La Louvière, Belgium
- Died: 30 October 2020 (aged 90)
- Occupations: Composer; Professor

Paul-Baudouin Michel (7 September 1930 – 30 October 2020) was a Belgian composer, professor, and writer. He was a member of the Royal Academy of Science, Letters and Fine Arts of Belgium.

== Biography ==
After he attended the Conservatoire Royal de Mons, Michel continued his studies at the Queen Elisabeth Music Chapel, where he worked on composition under Jean Absil and graduated in 1962. He worked in orchestral conducting and musical analysis at the Académie d'été in Nice. He then became director of the Académie de musique de Woluwe-Saint-Lambert, where he taught harmony and the history of music. He was a professor of music at the Conservatoire Royal de Mons and the Royal Conservatory of Brussels. He became a member of the Royal Academy of Science, Letters and Fine Arts of Belgium in 1997, and subsequently became a lecturer on new music and wrote radio broadcasts.

Paul-Baudouin Michel died on 30 October 2020 at the age of 90.

== Works ==
- Variations symphoniques
- Symphonium III Jeanne la Folle
- Symphonium IV dite Sommeil paradoxal
- L'Oreille fertile
- Engrenage
- Atomes crochus
- 16 interludes for piano
- Lamobylrinthe
- Mystère-jeu for viola and piano (1976)

== Prizes ==
- Prix Émile Doehaerd of CeBeDem
- Prix de composition of the Queen Elisabeth Competition
- Prix international radiophonique Paul Gilson
- Prix Camille Huysmans
- Prix de l'Académie Royale
- Prix Koopal
- Prix Créamuse
- Prix Ernest Bloch de Lugano
- Prix spécial of the City of Geneva

== Literary works ==
- Il faut détruire les villes de plus de 200,000 habitants
- La Lévitation et les prostituées sacrées
- Le Commencement des incertitudes
