= Hubert Schoonbroodt =

Belgian musician (1941–1992)

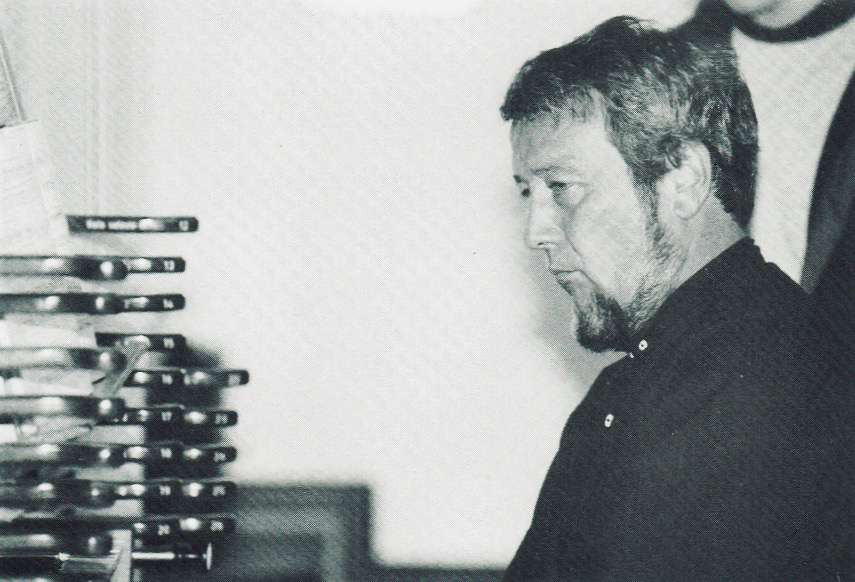
Hubert Schoonbroodt

Hubert Schoonbroodt (8 August 1941 in Eupen – 5 February 1992 in Jalhay) was a Belgian oboist, organist and conductor.
