= Marcel Hendrickx (politician) =

Belgian politician (1935–2020)

Member of the Belgian Chamber of Representatives
- In office 13 June 1999 – 10 April 2003

Personal details
- Born: 21 August 1935 Turnhout, Belgium
- Died: 26 October 2020 (aged 85) Turnhout, Belgium
- Party: CD&V

Marcel Hendrickx (21 August 1935 – 26 October 2020) was a Belgian politician and member of the Flemish Christian Democrat Party.

Hendrickx was mayor of Turnhout from 1995 until 2008. In 2009, he became chairman of KFC Turnhout. He served until 2015.
