= European Journal of Communication =

- Discipline: Communication
- Language: English
- Edited by: Peter Golding, Helena Sousa and Karin Raeymakers

Publication details
- History: 1986–present
- Publisher: SAGE Publications
- Frequency: Quarterly
- Impact factor: 1.500 (2017)

Standard abbreviations
- ISO 4: Eur. J. Commun.

Indexing
- CODEN: EJCOET
- ISSN: 0267-3231 (print); 1460-3705 (web)
- LCCN: 89649809
- OCLC no.: 174447263

Links
- Journal homepage; Online access; Online archive

European Journal of Communication is a quarterly peer-reviewed academic journal that covers research on communications and media. The journal was established in 1986 and covers all aspects of communication research and theory.

== Abstracting and indexing ==
European Journal of Communication is abstracted and indexed in Scopus and the Social Sciences Citation Index. According to the Journal Citation Reports, its 2017 impact factor is 1.500, ranking it 34th out of 84 in the category "Communication".
