= The Night Club (novel) =

Novel by Georges Simenon

- Author: Georges Simenon
- Original title: L'Âne Rouge
- Translator: Jean Stewart
- Language: French
- Genre: Psychological novel
- Published: Hamish Hamilton (UK), 1979

The Night Club is a novel by the Belgian writer Georges Simenon. The original French version L'Âne Rouge appeared in 1933; the English translation was first published in 1979.

The novel is among his romans durs, a term roughly translated as hard, or harrowing, novels; it was used by Simenon for what he regarded as his serious literary works.

The novel is set in Nantes, France. Simenon grew up in Liège in Belgium, but some elements of the novel are autobiographical: the young journalist who becomes interested in seedy nightlife, his weak mother, and his father with a heart condition.

== Summary ==
The story is seen from the point of view of Jean Cholet, a young journalist with the Gazette de Nantes, who lives with his parents. He attends an official banquet one evening, where he gets drunk and goes on to the night club L'Âne Rouge ("The Red Donkey"); he is intrigued by Speelman, a theatre company manager. Interested in the night club, he visits regularly and gets to know the people there; Lulu, a singer, becomes his lover. His absence from home overnight upsets his mother, but his father has some admiration for him. Often buying rounds of drinks at the club, Cholet borrows money from his colleagues. A network of lies develops, to explain his absences; he invents, for his newspaper, reports of meetings he did not attend. A friend of Speelman bribes Cholet to steal birth certificates from the registrar's office.

In the meantime there are other events: his father suffers a heart attack and is in bed for several days before returning to his office job; Cholet attends the scene of a ship collision in the harbour.

When Lulu decides to move to Paris, he accompanies her. He has a futile interview with a newspaper editor there; he lies to Lulu about his progress in getting a job. He is destitute, and is losing interest in Lulu. A telegram from his mother informs him that his father has died, and he returns to Nantes. Although the family understands that the fatal heart attack happened at work, Cholet is privately told of the actual circumstance.
