= Marnix Vincent =

Belgian literary translator

Marnix Vincent (1936–2016) was a Belgian literary translator, primarily translating Dutch into French.

== Life ==
Vincent was born in Oudenaarde on December 25, 1936. He studied romance languages at the University of Ghent, and went on to teach at the Institut libre Marie Haps. In 2005, he was awarded the Flemish Community's triennial prize for the translation of Dutch literature. He died in Aalst on April 6, 2016.

== Work ==
Authors he translated included literary giants like Hugo Claus, Willem Elsschot, and Gerard Reve, as well as writers such as Leonard Nolens, Luuk Gruwez, and Stefan Hertmans. His French translation of Vincent van Gogh's letters was published by Actes Sud in 2009.
