= Herman Vander Linden =

Belgian historian

Professor Herman Vander Linden
- Born: 27 April 1868; Leuven, Brabant, Belgium
- Died: 15 April 1956 (aged 87); Korbeek-Lo, Brabant, Belgium

Academic background
- Education: Koninklijk Atheneum Leuven
- Alma mater: Ghent University
- Thesis: Histoire de la constitution de la ville de Louvain au moyen âge (1891)
- Doctoral advisor: Henri Pirenne
- Other advisor: Paul Fredericq

Academic work
- Discipline: historian
- Sub-discipline: medievalist
- Institutions: University of Liège

Herman Vander Linden (1868–1956) was a Belgian historian who was a professor at the University of Liège.

== Life ==
Vander Linden was born in Leuven on 27 April 1868 and was educated in the state secondary school there. He graduated doctor of philosophy from Ghent University in 1891, with a thesis on the constitution of the medieval city of Leuven. His teachers were Henri Pirenne and Paul Fredericq. He visited a number of German universities and studied at the Ecole des Chartes in Paris (1892-1894). In 1895 he obtained a special doctorate in historical sciences with a thesis on merchant guilds in the medieval Low Countries.

From October 1895 to October 1903 he taught history and geography in a state secondary school in Antwerp. In 1903 he was appointed to a lectureship in the University of Liège. His private library was destroyed in the sack of Leuven in 1914. He and his family became refugees in England, returning after the end of the German occupation of Belgium in World War I. Together with F. L. Ganshof he edited the 1926 Festschrift for Henri Pirenne, Mélanges d'histoire offerts à Henri Pirenne par ses anciens élèves et ses amis à l'occasion de sa quarantième année d'enseignement à l'Université de Gand, 1886-1926.

Vander Linden retired from teaching in 1938. He was an active contributor to the Biographie Nationale de Belgique, and from 1935 to 1944 secretary of the committee responsible for publishing it. Under the German occupation of Belgium during World War II, one of his sons was arrested as a member of the Resistance, and died in a German concentration camp in 1942. Herman Vander Linden died in Korbeek-Lo on 15 April 1956.

== Honours ==
- Corresponding member of the Royal Academy of Science, Letters and Fine Arts of Belgium, 2 May 1921; full member 4 May 1931.
- Deputy member of the Commission royale d'Histoire 16 March 1922; full member 30 November 1931.

== Publications ==
- Histoire de la constitution de la ville de Louvain au moyen âge (Ghent, 1892).
- Les Gildes marchandes dans les Pays-Bas au moyen âge (Ghent, 1896).
- with Paul Hamelius, Anglo-Belgian Relations, Past and Present (London, 1918)
- Itinéraires de Marie de Bourgogne et de Maximilien d'Autriche, 1477-1482 (Brussels, 1934).
- Itinéraires de Charles, duc de Bourgogne, Marguerite d'York et Marie de Bourgogne, 1467-1477 (Brussels, 1936).
- Itinéraires de Philippe le Bon, duc de Bourgogne, 1419-1467, et de Charles, comte de Charolais, 1433-1467 (Brussels, 1940).
- "La Forêt charbonnière", Revue Belge de Philologie et d'Histoire, vol. 2 (1923), pp. 203-214.
