= Paul Hamelius =

Belgian philologist

Professor Doctor Paul Hamelius
- Born: 26 April 1868; Ypres, West Flanders, Belgium
- Died: 23 February 1922 (aged 53); Liège, Liège Province, Belgium
- Other name: Paul Hamélius

Academic background
- Education: Athénée royal d'Arlon, Athénée royal de Bruxelles
- Alma mater: École normale des Humanités de Liège
- Thesis: Die Kritik in der englischen Literatur des 17. und 18. Jahrhunderts (1897)
- Doctoral advisor: Oswald Orth

Academic work
- Discipline: Philology
- Sub-discipline: English Literature
- Institutions: University of Liège
- Main interests: Middle English literature, English Renaissance literature
- Notable works: Mandeville's Travels (EETS, 1919, 1923)

Paul Hamelius or Hamélius (1868–1922) was a Belgian philologist who produced the two-volume Early English Text Society edition of the Travels of Sir John Mandeville (1919, 1923).

== Life ==
Hamelius was born on 26 April 1868 in Ypres, West Flanders, Belgium, where his father, originally from Luxembourg, was stationed as a military doctor. Between the ages of 3 and 12 he grew up in Metz, which was then in the German Empire, and received his primary education in German. After returning to Belgium he trained as a teacher, and taught at secondary schools (athénées) in Tournai, Charleroi and Ixelles. He received a doctorate in Germanic philology from the University of Liège in 1898.

In 1904 he became professor of English Language and Literature at the University of Liège, giving his inaugural lecture on 11 November. Although growing up speaking Luxembourgish at home, he had become fully fluent in English, French, and German. In 1914 he produced a personal account of the Battle of Liège in English. During the war he worked from London for the intelligence and propaganda services of the Belgian government in exile.

His article "La littérature des proscrits en Angleterre" (on two pieces of 14th-century outlaw literature) appeared in the first issue of the flagship Revue belge de philologie et d'histoire. He died in Liège on 23 February 1922.

== Works ==
=== As author ===
- Histoire politique et littéraire du mouvement flamand (1894)
- Die Kritik in der englischen Literatur des 17. und 18. Jahrhunderts (1897) – doctoral dissertation
- The Siege of Liège, a Personal Narrative, with a Plan of the Forts (1914)
- with Herman Vander Linden, Anglo-Belgian Relations, Past and Present (1918)
- Introduction à la littérature française et flamande de Belgique (1921)

=== As editor ===
- Thomas Southern's "Loyal Brother": A Play on the Popish Plot (1911)
- Mandeville's Travels (1919, 1923)
