= Societal transformation =

Deep and sustained change in a society

In sociology, societal transformation refers to “a deep and sustained, nonlinear systemic change” in a society. Transformational changes can occur within a particular system, such as a city, a transport or energy system. Societal transformations can also refer to changes of an entire culture or civilization. Such transformations often include not only social changes but cultural, technological, political, and economic, as well as environmental. Transformations can be seen as occurring over several centuries, such as the Neolithic Revolution or at a rapid pace, such as the rapid expansion of megacities in China.

Whereas social transformation is typically used within sociology to characterize the process of change either in an individual’s ascribed social status, or in social structures, such as institutional relationships, habits, norms, and values, societal transformation refers to a wider set of societal structural changes.

The concept of societal transformations have for some time been used in academic disciplines such as political economy, development economics, history or anthropology. Since 2010, the concept has been increasingly used in policy-making, research and media to point out that small adjustments of present habits, technologies and policies does not suffice to meet the environmental, climate and sustainable development goals. The Decision of the United Nations 2030 Agenda outlining the Sustainable Development Goals bears the heading “transforming our world”. The special report on global warming of 1.5 °C by the Intergovernmental Panel on Climate Change (IPCC) states that curbing global warming to 1.5 °C compared to preindustrial levels “would require transformative systemic change, integrated with sustainable development”. Similarly, the 2019 global assessment report of the Intergovernmental Science-Policy Platform on Biodiversity and Ecosystem Services (IPBES) concludes that transformative changes in society are crucial for nature protection. The European Green Deal, proposed by the European Commission, see deeply transformative policies to restructure the EU's economy as fundamental for its vision of a healthier, greener and more prosperous Europe.

== See also ==
- Social change
- Social transformation
- Sustainability transformation
- Transformation of the Western Roman Empire
- Global catastrophic risk
