= Oswald Orth =

German professor of English literature

Professor Doctor Oswald Orth
- Born: 1832; Weilbach, Duchy of Nassau, German Confederation
- Died: 13 December 1920 (aged 87–88)

Academic background
- Education: University of Rostock
- Thesis: Versuch einer Theorie der historischen Wissenschaft (1869)

Academic work
- Discipline: Philology
- Sub-discipline: English Literature
- Institutions: University of Liège
- Notable students: Paul Hamelius, Camille Huysmans

Oswald Orth (1832–1920) was the first professor of English Literature at the University of Liège.

== Life ==
Orth was born in 1832 in Weilbach, now a subdivision of Flörsheim am Main, in the Duchy of Nassau. In 1869 he obtained a doctorate from the University of Rostock with a thesis on the philosophy of history. He became a teacher of German at the Athénée royal de Liège. At the creation of the department of Germanic philology of the University of Liège in 1890, he was appointed to teach English philology, comparative grammar of the Germanic languages, and historical grammar of German. He was president of the organising committee of the second conference of the Association belge des professeurs de langues vivantes, held in September 1909.

Orth retired in 1904, and was succeeded as professor of English Literature by his former doctoral student, Paul Hamelius, and in comparative grammar by Joseph Mansion. At his death, on 13 December 1920, he bequeathed his personal library to the university.
