= Mohammed and Charlemagne =

Book by Henri Pirenne

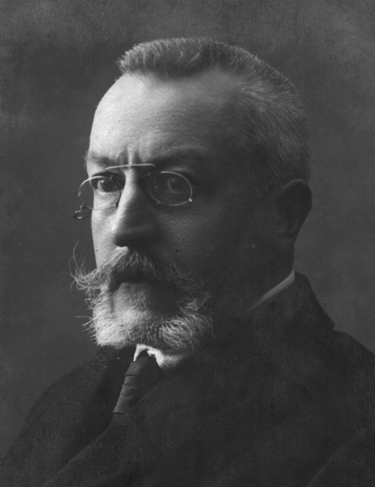
- Pirenne, pictured c.1910
- Author: Henri Pirenne
- Original title: Mahomet et Charlemagne
- Translator: Bernard Miall
- Language: French language
- Subject: Early Medieval Europe
- Publisher: Félix Alcan Nouvelle Société d'Editions
- Publication date: 1937
- Publication place: Belgium
- English publication date: 1939 (G. Allen & Unwin)
- Preceded by: Histoire de Belgique

Mohammed and Charlemagne (French: Mahomet et Charlemagne) is an academic book by the Belgian historian Henri Pirenne (1862–1935) which was first published posthumously in 1937. It set out an alternative argument about the end of Roman influence in Europe and the emergence of the Dark Ages which emphasised the importance of the Arab expansion in the Middle East and Levant which has become known as the Pirenne Thesis. Although successive historians have tended to reject the argument as an explanation of the period, it remains influential as a means of thinking about geography and periodisation in the Early Middle Ages and the debate it sparked is widely taught in university medieval history courses.

== Argument and reception ==
Mohammed and Charlemagne represented the culmination of Pirenne's longstanding interest in the end of Late Antiquity and the beginning of the Middle Ages in Europe. It was first expressed in an article of the same name published in the Revue Belge de Philologie et d'Histoire in 1922 followed by a second article entitled "An Economic Contrast: Merovingians and Carolingians" ("Un contraste économique. Mérovingiens et Carolingiens") in the same periodical in 1923. The two articles began a lengthy scholarly debate among historians, and Pirenne sought to explore further aspects of the subject in the body of studies later compiled into the book.

According to Pirenne the real break in Roman history occurred in the 8th century as a result of Arab expansion. Islamic conquest of the area of today's south-eastern Turkey, Syria, Palestine, North Africa, Spain and Portugal ruptured economic ties to Western Europe and cut the region off from trade and turning it into a stagnant backwater, with wealth flowing out in the form of raw resources and nothing coming back. That began a steady decline and impoverishment and so by the time of Charlemagne, Western Europe had become almost entirely agrarian at a subsistence level, with no long-distance trade.

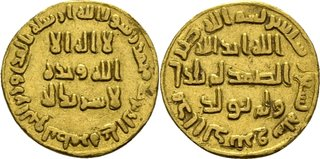
7th-century gold dinar of Abd al-Malik ibn Marwan. By the time of its production, the minting of gold coins had effectively stopped north of the Alps.

In a summary, Pirenne stated, "Without Islam, the Frankish Empire would probably never have existed, and Charlemagne, without Muhammad, would be inconceivable". That is, he rejected the notion that the Dark Ages had been caused by the destruction of the Western Roman Empire by the barbarian invasions of the 4th and the 5th centuries. Instead, the Muslim conquest of North Africa made the Mediterranean a barrier; cut Western Europe from the east; and enabled the Carolingians, especially Charlemagne, to create a new distinctly-western form of government. Many scholars have taken issue with Pirenne ascribing to Islam such a preeminent role in the decline of the Classical world. Archaeological evidence suggests that by the late fifth century, well before the rise of Islam, significant decline had become entrenched in the western empire. Peter Brown goes further, claiming that as early as the third century economic activity had diminished to a level insufficient to maintain an empire. Simply put, Pirenne's chronology does not work: Islam appeared long after the decline had begun.

Pirenne used statistical data regarding money in support of his thesis. Much of his argument builds upon the disappearance from Western Europe of items that had to come from outside. For example, the minting of gold coins north of the Alps stopped after the 7th century, which indicated a loss of access to wealthier parts of the world. Items like Papyrus, which was made only in Egypt, no longer appeared in Northern Europe after the 7th century, and writing reverted to using parchment, which indicated the region's economic isolation. These claims have been challenged by a number of historians. It has been noted that the alleged disappearances were not contemporaneous with one another, nor indeed with the Arab conquests, which undermines Pirenne's claim that there was an effective Arab blockade, as well as the chronology of his argument. Furthermore, the extent to which these items did actually disappear has been questioned, with the availability of papyrus, spices and silk recorded in the Carolingian era. But while Pirenne might have overstated his case, a recent study of coin flows by Johannes Boehm and Thomas Chaney suggests that in the century or so following the Arab conquests money flows dramatically changed, with much less north-south trade than had been the case before the Arab conquest and the clear emergence of two distinct economic blocks. This raises the prospect that while Pirenne was wrong to assign Islam a meaningful role in the decline of the Roman world, he was correct in suggesting that Islam did have a catalyzing effect on the development of a distinctive, European polity.

Pirenne's thesis did not convince most of the historians at the time of its publication, but historians have since generally agreed that the book has both stimulated debate on the Early Middle Ages and provided a provocative example of how periodization would work. It continues to inform historical discussion in the 21st century, with more recent debate focusing on whether later archaeological discoveries refute the thesis or demonstrate its fundamental viability.

New Findings in Support of Pirenne's Theses (2024-Present)

A data-driven study on coin flow and the relative speed of trading routes in and around the Mediterranean sea, published in 2024, substantially reestablishes the main gist of Pirenne's argument about the transformation of Western and Byzantine sea-trade around the Mediterranean during the rise the Caliphate:

On the first map [charting coin flow from 450-630] the Mediterranean still looks like a tightly integrated commercial web, the second one [charting coin-flow after the establishment of the Umayyad Caliphate, from 713-900] looks like someone cut the sea in half with a ceremonial scimitar. [...] So it seems the key argument of Pirenne’s 1937 posthumous work Mahomet et Charlemagne rings true: The Germanic invasions may have ruptured the political fabric of the late Roman world, but not its commercial unity. That was shattered when the Arab conquests cut Christian Europe off from its eastern markets, forcing a new northern center of gravity. It wasn’t the Visigoths who ended antiquity but rather the Caliphs. To put it another way: Modern Europe owes its existence to its civilizational competitor, the Islamic world, remarks a review of this study published in June 2026.
