= Social change =

Alteration in the social order

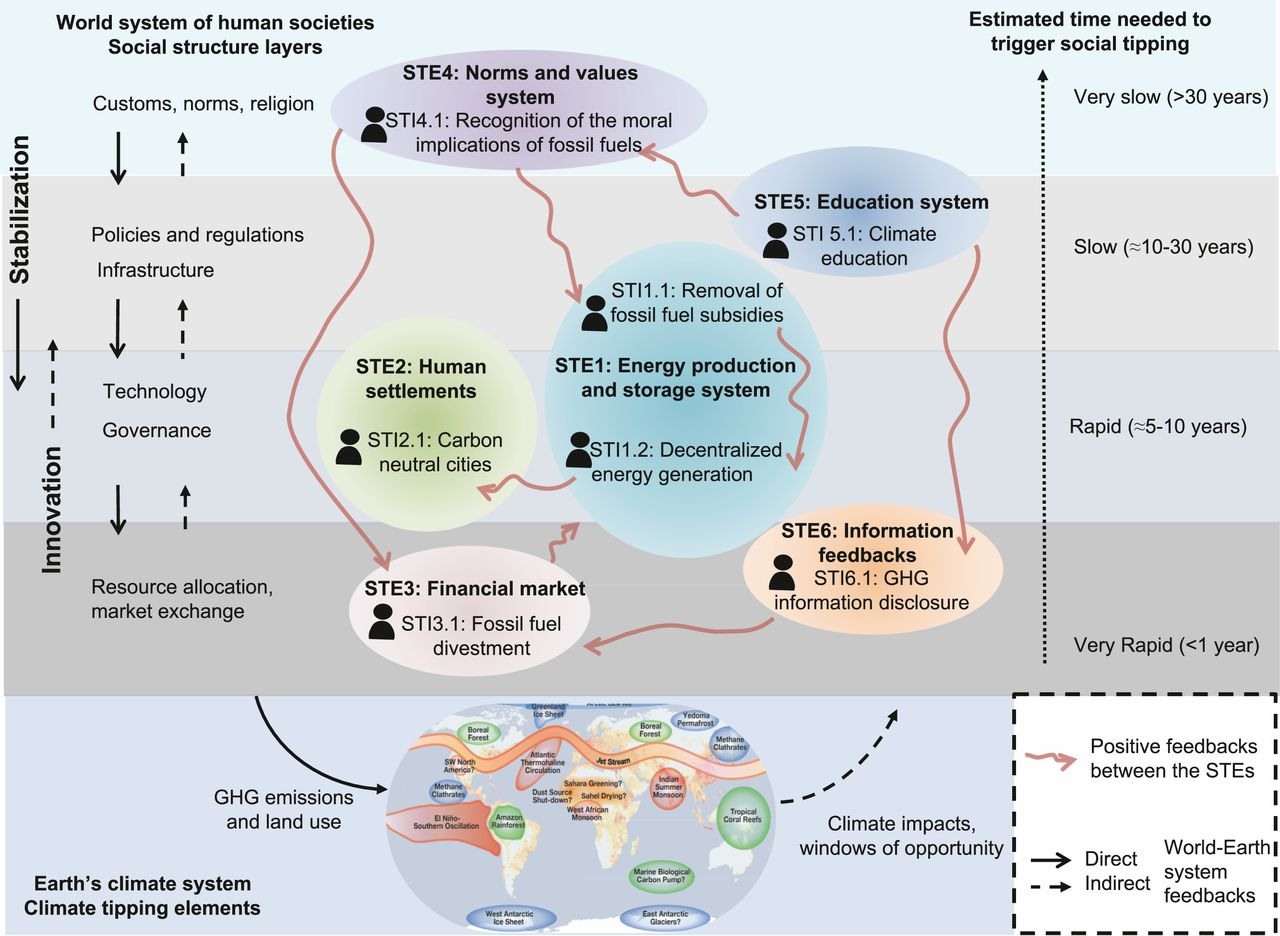
A set of social changes proposed for climate change mitigation

Social change is the alteration of the social order of a society which may include changes in social institutions, social behaviours or social relations. Sustained at a larger scale, it may lead to social transformation or societal transformation.

== Definition ==
Social change may not refer to the notion of social progress or sociocultural evolution, the philosophical idea that society moves forward by evolutionary means. It may refer to a paradigmatic change in the socio-economic structure, for instance the transition from feudalism to capitalism, or hypothetical future transition to some form of post-capitalism.

Social development is the people that develop social and emotional skills across the lifespan, with particular attention to childhood and adolescence. Healthy social development allows us to form positive relationships with family, friends, teachers, and other people in our lives.

Accordingly, it may also refer to social revolution, such as the Socialist revolution presented in Marxism, or to other social movements, such as women's suffrage or the civil rights movement. Social change may be driven through cultural, religious, economic, environmental, scientific or technological forces.

== Prominent theories ==
Change arises from two primary sources: unique factors, such as climate, weather, or the presence of specific groups of people, and systematic factors. For example, successful development generally has the same requirements, such as a stable and flexible government, enough free and available resources, and a diverse social organization of society. On the whole, social change is usually a combination of systematic factors along with some random or unique factors.

Many theories attempt to explain social change. One view suggests that a theory of change should include elements such as structural aspects of change (like population shifts), processes and mechanisms of social change, and directions of change.

- Christian: In Christianity and Judaism social change is seen in terms of God's blessings on faithfulness or curses on disobedience. See Deuteronomy chapter 28.
- Hegelian: The classic Hegelian dialectic model of change is based on the interaction of opposing forces. Starting from a point of momentary stasis, Thesis countered by Antithesis first yields conflict, then it subsequently results in a new Synthesis.
- Marxist: Marxism presents a dialectical and materialist concept of history, seeing humankind's history as a fundamental "struggle between social classes". According to Marx's 11th thesis on Feuerbach, this is tantamount to "changing the world" ("sie [die Welt] zu verändern").
- Kuhnian: The philosopher of science, Thomas Kuhn argues in The Structure of Scientific Revolutions with respect to the Copernican Revolution that people are likely to continue utilizing an apparently unworkable paradigm until a better paradigm is commonly accepted. A Kuhnian approach to the study of societies is provided by the critical juncture approach to social order and change.
- Heraclitan: The Greek philosopher Heraclitus used the metaphor of a river to speak of change thus: "On those stepping into rivers staying the same other and other waters flow" (DK22B12). What Heraclitus seems to be suggesting here, later interpretations notwithstanding, is that, in order for the river to remain the river, change must constantly be taking place. Thus one may think of the Heraclitan model as parallel to that of a living organism, which, in order to remain alive, must constantly change. A contemporary application of this approach is shown in the social-change theory SEED-SCALE which builds off of the complexity theory subfield of emergence.
- Daoist: The Chinese philosophical work Dao De Jing, I.8 and II.78 uses the metaphor of water as the ideal agent of change. Water, although soft and yielding, will eventually wear away stone. Change, in this model, is to be natural, harmonious and steady, albeit imperceptible.

== Types of change ==
Social changes can vary according to speed and scope and impetus. Some research on the various types of social change focuses on social organizations such as corporations.

Different manifestations of change include:

- Fabian change – gradual and reformist incremental amelioration after the manner of the Fabian Society
- radical change – improvements root and branch in the style of political radicalism
- revolutionary change – abrupt, radical and drastic change, with implications of violence and of starting afresh (perhaps most popular as a political bogeyman)
- transformational change – a New-age version of radical change, and thus difficult to define
- continuous change, open-ended change – change (allegedly) for the sake of change
- top-down change – reliance on leadership
- bottom-up change – reliance on the huddled masses
- reactionary change – the reversal of a previous political or social change
- socio-tectonic change – postulated deep-seated fundamental social shifts

== Current examples ==
=== Global demographic shifts ===
One of the most obvious changes currently occurring is the change in the relative global population distribution between countries. In recent decades, developing countries have become a larger proportion of the world population, increasing from 68% in 1950 to 82% in 2010, and the population of the developed countries has declined from 32% of the total world population in 1950 to 18% in 2010. China and India continue to be the largest countries, followed by the US as a distant third.

However, population growth throughout the world is slowing. Population growth among developed countries has been slowing since the 1950s and is now at 0.3% annual growth. Population growth among the less developed countries excluding the least developed ones has also been slowing since 1960 and is now at 1.3% annually. Population growth among the least developed countries has slowed relatively little; as of 2022, the annual growth rate is 2.33%.

=== Gendered patterns of work and care ===
In much of the developed world, changes from distinct men's work and women's work to more gender equal patterns have been economically important since the mid-20th century. Both men and women are considered to be great contributors to social change worldwide.

== See also ==
- Accelerating change – Increase in the rate of technological change through history
- Activism – Efforts to make change in society toward a perceived greater good
- Alternative movement
- Comparative historical research – Method in the social sciences
- Constitutional economics – Research program in economics and constitutionalism
- Critical juncture theory – Theory of large, discontinuous changes
- Culture change – Term in public policy
- Decadence – Perceived decay of standards in a society
- Global Social Change Research Project
- Globalization – Increasing worldwide interdependence
- Historical sociology – Interdisciplinary field of research
- Industrialisation – Period of social and economic change from agrarian to industrial society
- Lifestyle (sociology) – Way or style of living
- Modernization theory – Explanation for the process of modernization within societies
- Reform movement – Type of social movement
- Reformism – Political ideology advocating gradual change
- Revolution – Rapid and fundamental political change
- Secularization – Societal transition away from religion
- Social conservatism – Political ideology advocating traditional values and power structures
- Social degeneration – Concept from the 18th and 19th centuries
- Social development theory – Development is a process of social change
- Social movement – Group sharing social or political objectives
- Social progress
- Social relation – Any interpersonal relationship between two or more conspecifics between/within groups
- Social revolution – Revolution reorganizing a whole society
- Social transformation – Alteration of social status or society itself
- Societal collapse – Fall of a complex human society
- Societal transformation – Deep and sustained change in a society
- Sociocultural evolution – Evolution of societies
