= Joseph Mansion (philologist) =

Linguist (1877–1937)

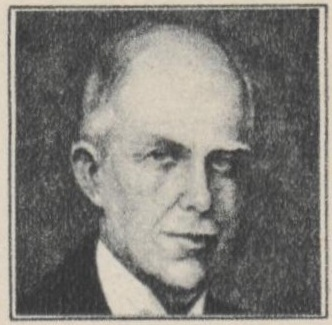
Joseph Mansion

Joseph Mansion (1877–1937) was a Belgian philologist and a professor at the University of Liège.

== Life ==
Mansion was born in Ghent on 9 January 1877 and studied at the Collège Sainte-Barbe in the city and at the University of Ghent. He wrote a doctorate in the field of classical philology, on gutturals in Ancient Greek. In 1900 he won a travel scholarship which enabled him to pursue studies at the universities of Leipzig, Bonn, Berlin and Cambridge. On 20 October 1904 he was appointed at the University of Liège to replace Oswald Orth in teaching comparative grammar of the Germanic languages, and historical grammar of English and German. From 1905 he also taught Gothic. He was appointed extraordinary professor on 18 October 1910, and full professor on 22 May 1919. From 1908 he also taught comparative grammar of Greek and Latin, and Sanskrit language and literature.

In 1924 Mansion was appointed director of the Royal Academy of Dutch Language and Literature, of which he had become a corresponding member in 1909 and a full member in 1911. He was also a member of the Maatschappij der Nederlandse Letterkunde, the Société de Linguistique de Paris, and the Commission Royale de Toponymie et Dialectologie.

Mansion died in Liège on 8 November 1937.

== Publications ==
- Les Gutturales grecques (Ghent and Paris, 1904)
- Oud-gentsche naamkunde (The Hague, 1924)
- Esquisse d'une histoire de la langue sanscrite (Paris, 1931)
- De voornaamste bestanddeelen der Vlaamsche plaatsnamen (Brussels, 1935)
- "Déclinaison du Hittite", Mélanges H. Pedersen (1937), pp. 480-487
