= Social transformation =

Alteration of social status or society itself

In sociology, social transformation is a somewhat ambiguous term that has two broad definitions.

One definition of social transformation is the process by which an individual alters the socially ascribed social status of their parents into a socially achieved status for themselves (status transformation). Another definition refers to large scale social change as in cultural reforms or transformations (societal transformation). The first occurs with the individual, the second with the social system.

== Individual ==
This is different from social reproduction and social mobility because instead of looking at the intergenerational mobility or the measure of the changes in social status which occur from the parents' to the children's generation, social transformation focuses on how an individual can alter the class culture to which they feel aligned. One socially transforms in three steps: by associational embracement, associational distancing, and the distinct presentation of self.

Social transformation is considered an interpersonal negotiation because it requires that the individual have their social position be validated by others for transformation. It is a reciprocal relationship in which people have to be embraced and correctly identified with the cultural expectations of their particular class membership. This is the only way that persons can move from their own ascribed status to a new achieved status.

== Social system ==
Social transformation in this context requires a shift in collective consciousness of a society — local, state, national or global — so that reality is refined by consensus. This often happens by external stimulus and sometimes intentionally. Scientific discoveries have triggered many social transformations throughout our history as have religious and royal edicts.

Cities which have reinvented themselves serve of examples of conscious transformations of a social type resulting in reinvigorated and revitalized populations, economic prosperity and restored civic pride. Some countries have achieved these intentional social transformations, one such example being South Africa in 1994 when it ended apartheid.

Social transformations are such when they sustain over time where attitudes and values are held in a completely new context (or paradigm) based upon different assumptions and beliefs.

== Ascribed status versus achieved status ==
Ascribed status is the social status a person is given when he or she is born into a status from birth and assumes the class role later in life. People born into families with wealth, for example, are considered to have ascribed social statuses from birth. In the U.S. specifically, race/ethnic differences and gender can create basis for ascribed statuses.

Achieved status is acquired based on merit, skills, abilities, and actions. Examples of achieved status include being a doctor or even being a criminal—the status then determines a set of behaviors and expectations for the individual.

== Other forms of class identification ==
- Wealth and/or Income
- Education
- Occupation
- Family background
- Race
- Cultural refinement
- Tastes and interests
- Self-identifications
- good work identification

== Class culture and cultural capital ==
In order for an individual to gain membership into a group, he or she must engage in "requisite role enactments" to be recognized and legitimized as a member of the group. This means taking on the commonly associated scripts associated with different classes, understood through studying the different types of class culture and forms of culture capital. This can include cultural capital, a term created by Pierre Bourdieu, and can be in three states:

- Embodied: Inherited and acquired way of thinking about one's self or habitus.
- Objectified: Things (objects) which are owned, such as a BMW, a home, a painting, etc.
- Institutionalized: Recognition on an institutional level, such as earning a college degree or prestigious award.

In a study by Mark Granfield of working-class law students aiming to succeed at an Ivy-League law school, Granfield noted the importance of making alterations in the students' "interpersonal relations" including everyday changes such as patterns in their clothing and speech.

== Associational embracement ==
An individual engages in associational embracement when they make a verbal acceptance of their set relationships with others in order to confirm and assume their social identity. This is a crucial role in individual identity (trans)formation because it is the verbal recognition and acceptance into the group of which they aspire to be members. Self-avowal allows for personal embodiment and a solidified sense of "where they fit into the social structure." A key example would a young student deciding where to go to college, because it is a decision that is often influenced by a person's individual relationships. One must weigh many factors when they socially transform, including whom with they want to embrace.

- Proactive embracement: actively seeking out interactions that represent their desired social identities.
- Retroactive embracement: characterized by intentionality, it is when individuals consciously direct their actions toward a desired end by immersing in interactive environments that will bring them closer to their "possible selves." This embracement is typical of individuals who are moving, for example, from the working class to the middle class, because they often don't enjoy the same benefits of their desired social group.

== Associational distancing ==
Individuals seeking to socially transform often engage in the reverse of associational embracement: dissociation with those in the group inconsistent with their desired social identity.

== Passing and the presentation of self ==
In the racial politics of North America and specifically in the United States, racial passing refers to a member of a racial group being accepted by others of a different race, especially in the case of a person of mixed race being accepted as a member of the racial majority. It is usually used derisively and is not considered politically correct to aspire or attempt to pass or to accuse another person of aspiring or attempting to pass. It is not a modern term, but is a form of social transformation. One "passes" or the more politically correct term used today, "socially transforms" in many different ways.

In a study by Peter Kaufman of working-class individuals who desired to identify with the middle class, he recognized the following changes in behavior, which could also apply to other forms of social transformation:

- Speech patterns: Those who sought to transform were very aware of the difference between sounding "educated" and sounding "lower class."
- Clothing: Those who transformed recognized the importance of dressing "properly" to fit their desired group, suggesting that there are rules that one must adhere to in order to "fit in."

By participating in and embracing the specific speech and dress patterns, those who seek to transform socially do so with the belief that their role enactments will solidify their desired social identity, or at least bring them one step closer to "sounding" and "looking the part".

== Social transformation and class-passing in popular culture ==
From reality television to the Internet to popular films to celebrity figures or artists, evidence of social transformation and instances of class-passing are prevalent in popular culture. Famous examples of class-passers include Britney Spears, and Oprah Winfrey. Very rich individuals today, they challenge the ideas of ascribed status by birth, wealth and education.

Examples of shows like "Who Wants to Be A Millionaire" to etiquette books show the new popular cultural expressions of class and the mere prevalence of these types of materials and overexposure of class-passers in the media can help explicate some of the underlying urges for social transformation.

== See also ==
- Social change
- social position
- social status
- social class
- social mobility
- status attainment
