= Histoire de Belgique (book series) =

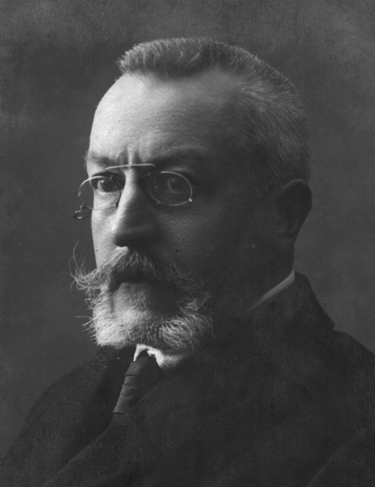
- Pirenne, pictured c.1910
- Author: Henri Pirenne
- Country: Belgium
- Language: French; Also: Dutch and German
- Publisher: Maurice Lamertin (Brussels)
- Published: 1900–1932
- No. of books: 7
- Followed by: Mohammed and Charlemagne

Histoire de Belgique (French pronunciation: [istwaʁ də bɛlʒik], lit. 'History of Belgium') is a seven-volume survey of the Belgian history by the historian Henri Pirenne (1862–1935) written in French and published between 1900 and 1932. The series, which traces the emergence of the Belgian nation-state from the Roman era until the start of World War I, is a classic of nationalist historiography and one of Pirenne's major works. Although Pirenne is today best known as a historian of Medieval Europe, the Histoire de Belgique series was his most respected work during his lifetime and the foundation of his reputation as Belgium's leading public historian.

== Argument and reception ==
Unlike much nationalist historiography, Pirenne's history did not trace the emergence of a "Volksgeist" (national spirit) but argued that Belgium had developed naturally as a cosmopolitan society to serve as a mediator between Latin and Germanic Europe. (Note: Unlike Pirenne, for instance, the socialist and anti-semite Edmond Picard had argued for the existence of a "Belgian spirit" (âme belge) in around 1900.) Pirenne did, however, believe in the existence of a distinctly "Belgian civilisation" (civilisation belge) reflecting a unique combination of external influences and which had changed over time without losing its distinctiveness, significantly pre-dating Belgium's independence in 1830. He sought to evidence this argument by examining the history of Belgium since the Roman era.

Histoire de Belgique received widespread popular acclaim within Belgium, transcending political differences between Liberals and Catholics. According to the historian Ernst Kossmann:

It was studied by the royal family, officers were made to read it in the military colleges, barristers in Brussels expounded it, schoolchildren received it as a prize for good examination results, for the bourgeoisie in town and country and the literary élite it was essential reading. On publication in the summer of 1911 the fourth volume sold seven hundred copies within three days. This was partly, but certain not entirely, due to the exceptional quality of Pirenne's insight and style.

Commemorative medal celebrating the completion of the Histoire de Belgique series.

Publication began in 1900 and ended in 1932 after being disrupted for several years during the German occupation of Belgium (1914–18) in which Pirenne had been held as a political prisoner. The seventh volume was awarded the Francqui Prize in 1933. According to modern historians, Pirenne's 1928 publication La Belgique et la Guerre Mondiale (Belgium and the World War) could be considered a chronological sequel, covering the period after the end of volume seven.

The series appeared in Dutch (Geschiedenis van België) and, encouraged by Pirenne's friend Karl Lamprecht, in German (Geschichte Belgiens) before World War I. Indeed, the first volume of the German translation was first published in 1899, before the appearance of the original French version in print. It has never been translated into English.

== Volumes ==
The series' seven volumes are entitled:

Volume no.	Original titles	Translation	Publication date
1	Des Origines au commencement du XIV^{e} siècle	From the Origins to the Start of the 14th Century	1900
2	Du Commencement du XIV^{e} siècle à la mort de Charles le Téméraire	From the Start of the 14th Century to the Death of Charles the Bold	1902
3	De la Mort de Charles le Téméraire à l'arrivée du Duc d'Albe dans les Pays-Bas (1567)	From the Death of Charles the Bold to the Arrival of the Duke of Alba in the Netherlands (1567)	1907
4	La Révolution politique et religieuse, le règne d'Albert et d'Isabelle, le régime espagnol jusqu'à la paix de Munster (1648)	The Political and Religious Revolution, the reign of Albert and Isabella, the Spanish Regime to the Peace of Münster (1648)	1911
5	La Fin du régime espagnol, le régime Autrichien, la révolution Brabançonne, et la révolution Liégeoise	The End of the Spanish Regime, the Austrian Regime, the Brabant Revolution and the Liège Revolution	1921
6	La Conquête Française, le Consultat et l'Empire, le royaume des Pays-Bas, la révolution Belge	The French Conquest, the Consulate and the Empire, the Kingdom of the Netherlands, the Belgian Revolution	1926
7	De la Révolution de 1830 à la guerre de 1914	From the Revolution of 1830 to the War of 1914	1932

The series was followed by Pirenne's final and most influential work, Mohammed and Charlemagne (Mahomet et Charlemagne), which put forward the so-called "Pirenne thesis" on the end of the ancient world and the emergence of the Middle Ages.
