= Revue Belge de Philologie et d'Histoire =

Revue Belge de Philologie et d’Histoire – Belgisch Tijdschrift voor Filologie en Geschiedenis
- Discipline: Philology, History
- Language: French, Dutch, English
- Edited by: Michèle Galand

Publication details
- History: 1922-present
- Publisher: Société pour le Progrès des Études Philologiques et Historiques (Belgium)
- Frequency: quarterly
- Open access: yes

Standard abbreviations
- ISO 4: Rev. Belge Philol. Hist.

Indexing
- ISSN: 0035-0818 (print); 2295-9068 (web)

Links
- Journal homepage; Online access

Revue Belge de Philologie et d’Histoire – Belgisch Tijdschrift voor Filologie en Geschiedenis, abbreviated RBPH/BTFG or simply RBPH, is a scholarly journal in the fields of philology and history, published in Belgium since 1922. Since 1953 it has included a compendious bibliography of current work on the history of Belgium, and it is the leading journal in this field.

The inaugural issue in 1922 included Henri Pirenne's famous article "Mahomet et Charlemagne", as well as an article by Paul Hamelius and a book review by François-Louis Ganshof.

== See also ==
- Journal of Belgian History
