= Paul Fredericq =

Belgian historian

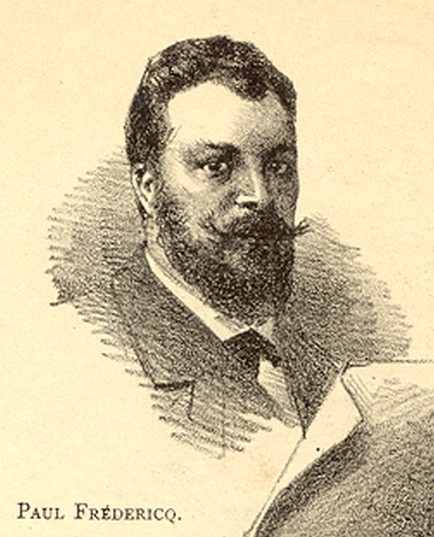
- Portrait drawing by Willem Steelink, Jr.
- Born: 12 August 1850; Ghent, East Flanders, Belgium
- Died: 23 March 1920 (aged 69); Ghent, East Flanders, Belgium
- Education: University of Ghent; University of Liège
- Occupations: Historian and political activist
- Writing career
- Language: French, Dutch

Paul Fredericq (12 August 1850 – 23 March 1920) was a Belgian historian at Ghent University active in the promotion of the use of the Dutch language in Belgium.

== Early life ==
Paul Fredericq was born in the Sleepstraat in Ghent, Belgium. A student at the Koninklijk Atheneum of Ghent, where Max Rooses and Jacob Heremans influenced him. He became a Protestant in his youth and his tendencies in religion, as in politics, were liberal. In 1871 he graduated as a high school teacher from the University of Liège and started working as a teacher in Mechelen and Arlon. In 1875, Fredericq received a special doctorate in historical sciences, with his study Essai sur le rôle politique et social des ducs de Bourgogne dans les Pays-Bas, and he became professor of history at the University of Liège.

== Academic career ==
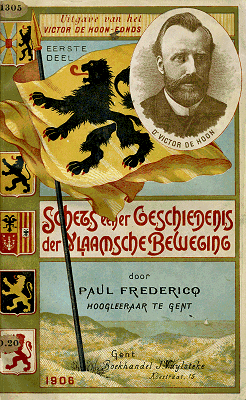
Cover of Fredericq's history of the Flemish Movement

After Jacob Heremans became emeritus, Paul Fredericq became professor of history at Ghent University in 1883. His courses included Dutch literature and practical exercises about Belgian history. Characterizing his sociability: Fredericq also taught in the relaxed surroundings of his home. It was probably during this period that he befriended the students of the 't zal wel gaan movement.

Fredericq was very active in the liberal wing of the Flemish Movement. During the period of 1891–95, he was a liberal member of the city council, and became president of the local Willemsfonds organization and editor in chief of the liberal magazine Het Volksbelang. Then founded the Hooger Onderwijs voor het Volk ("higher education for the people") in 1894, an experiment to close the education-gap between the elite and the workforce. However, Fredericq was especially important during the struggle to include Dutch into the Belgian education system. His activism culminated with his Schets eener Geschiedenis der Vlaamsche Beweging (1906–09), a short history of the Flemish Movement.

During World War I, on the invasion of Belgium by the Germans, Fredericq was active in encouraging the patriotic feelings of his countrymen in occupied Belgium and supporting non-violent resistance to the invader. As a result, he was deported to Germany on 16 March 1916, together with his colleague, the historian Henri Pirenne. He was interned successively at Gütersloh, Jena and Bürgel. The ordeal weakened him both physically and mentally.

After the war, he became rector at Ghent University in 1919. But quickly resigned after only a few weeks, disappointed by the anti-Flemish backlash. He died shortly afterwards in Ghent.

== Works ==
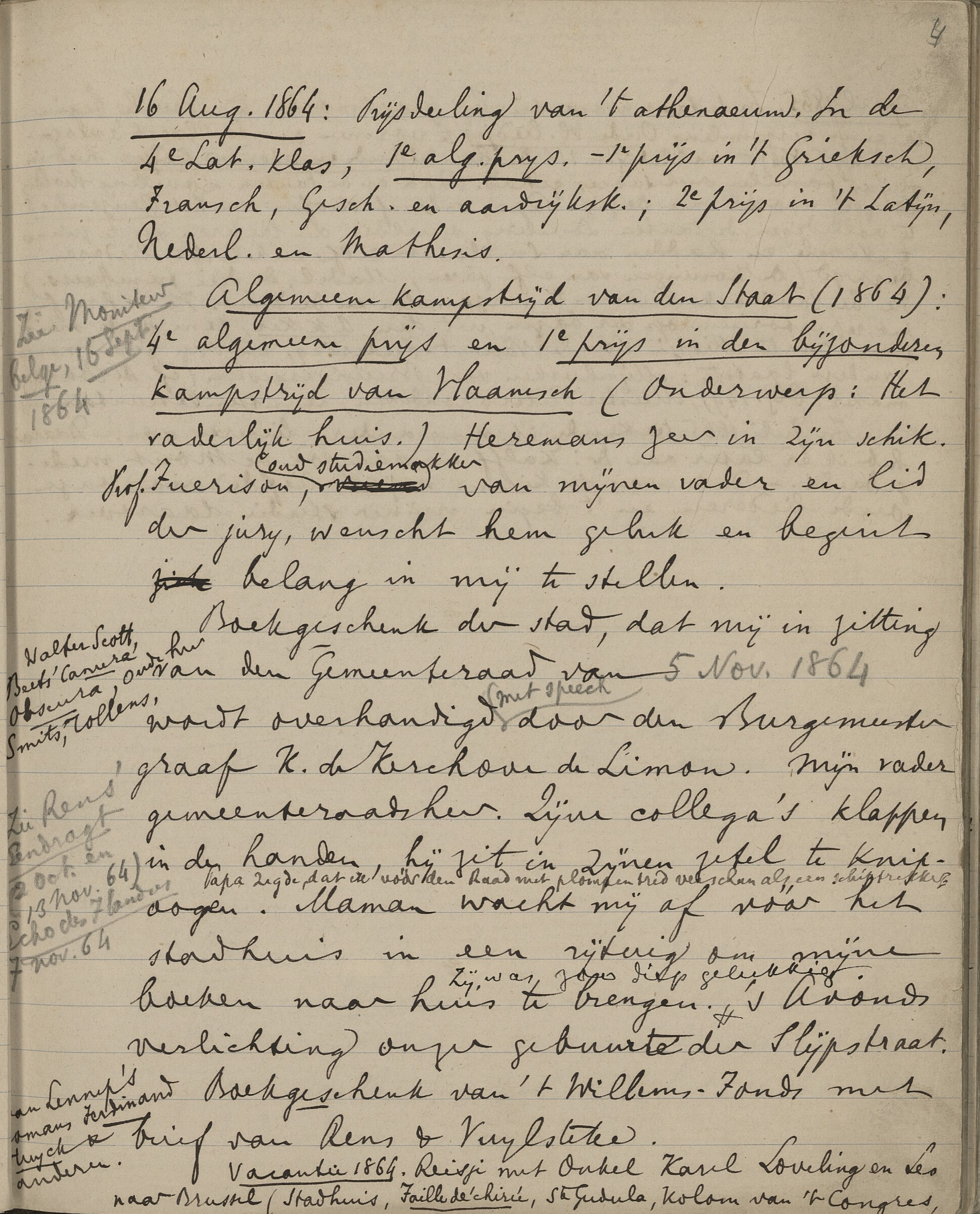
Excerpt from his autobiography, written at the end of the 19th century and the beginning of the 20th century.

Besides the works mentioned above, he wrote:

- De Nederlanden onder Keizer Karel, vol. i. (1885)
- Verzameling van stukken betreffende de pauselijke en bisschoppelijke Inquisitie in de Nederlanden (1889–96)
- Onze historische volksliederen van voor de zestiende eeuw (1894)
- Corpus documentorum inquisitionis haereticae pravitatis Neerlandicae : Verzameling van stukken betreffende de pauselijke en bisschoppelijke inquisitie in de Nederlanden. - Gent : Vuylstekes'Gravenhage : Nijhoff, 1889. Digital ed.
  - 1. 1025-1520. 1889
  - 2. Stukken tot aanvulling vanhet 1. deel (1077-1518). 1896
  - 3. 1236-1513. 1906
  - 4. 1514-1525. 1900
  - 5. 1525-1528. 1902
