= Henri Pirenne =

Belgian historian (1862–1935)

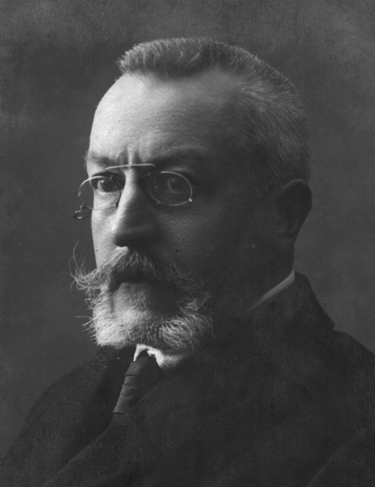
- Portrait of Pirenne, c. 1910
- Born: 23 December 1862; Verviers, Belgium
- Died: 24 October 1935 (aged 72); Uccle, Belgium
- Occupations: Historian and political activist
- Spouse: Jenny Vanderhaeghen
- Children: Henri Pirenne (1888–1935), Jacques Pirenne (1891–1972), Pierre Pirenne (1895–1914), Robert Pirenne (1900–1931), Jacqueline Pirenne (Granddaughter, 1918–1990)
- Awards: Francqui Prize (1933)

Academic background
- Education: University of Liège

Academic work
- Institutions: University of Ghent
- Notable works: Medieval Cities: Their Origins and the Revival of Trade (1927); Mohammed and Charlemagne (1937)

Henri Pirenne (French: [piʁɛn]; 23 December 1862 – 24 October 1935) was a Belgian nationalist and historian. A medievalist of Walloon descent, he wrote a multivolume history of Belgium in French and became a prominent public intellectual. Pirenne made a lasting contribution to the study of cities that was a controversial interpretation of the end of Roman civilization and the rebirth of medieval urban culture. He also became prominent in the nonviolent resistance to the Germans who occupied Belgium in World War I.

Henri Pirenne's reputation today rests on three contributions to European history: for what has become known as the Pirenne Thesis, concerning origins of the Middle Ages in reactive state formation and shifts in trade; for a distinctive view of Belgium's medieval history; and for his model of the development of the medieval city. His magnus opus, Histoire de Belgique is a classic in nationalist histography and comprehensively traces the origin of the modern Belgian state.

Pirenne argued that profound social, economic, cultural, and religious movements in the long term resulted from equally profound underlying causes, and this attitude influenced Marc Bloch and the outlook of the French Annales School of social history. Though Pirenne had his opponents in the 20th and early 21st century, notably Alfons Dopsch who disagreed on essential points, several recent historians of the Middle Ages have taken Pirenne's main theses, however much they are modified, as starting points.

== Biography ==
=== Early years ===
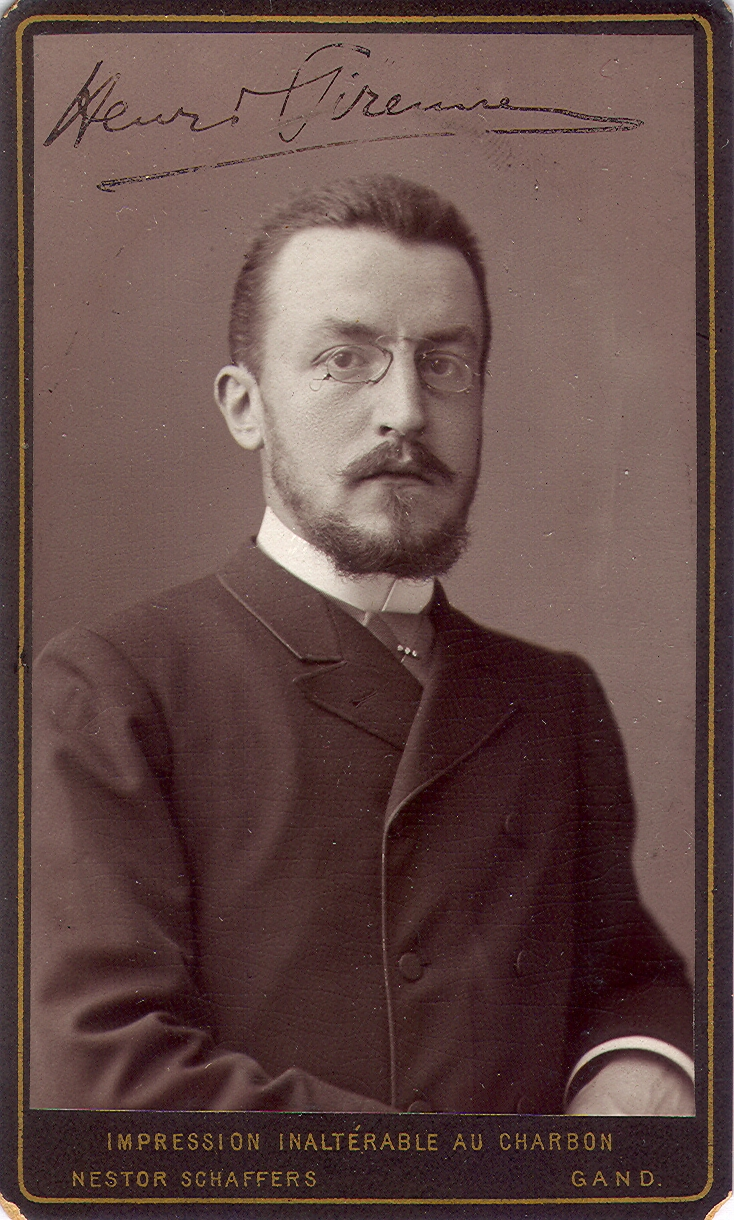
Henri Pirenne (c.1890)

Pirenne was born in Verviers, an industrial city in the Province of Liège in south-east Belgium.

He studied at the University of Liège where he was a student of Godefroid Kurth (1847–1916). He became Professor of History at the University of Ghent in 1886, a post he held until the end of his teaching career in 1930. After World War I he was the most prominent and influential historian in Belgium, receiving numerous honours and committee assignments. He was Rector of the University of Ghent from 1918 to 1921. Pirenne was a close friend of German historian Karl Lamprecht (1856–1915), until they broke during the war when Lamprecht headed a mission to invite Belgians to collaborate with Germany's long-term goals.

=== Captivity ===
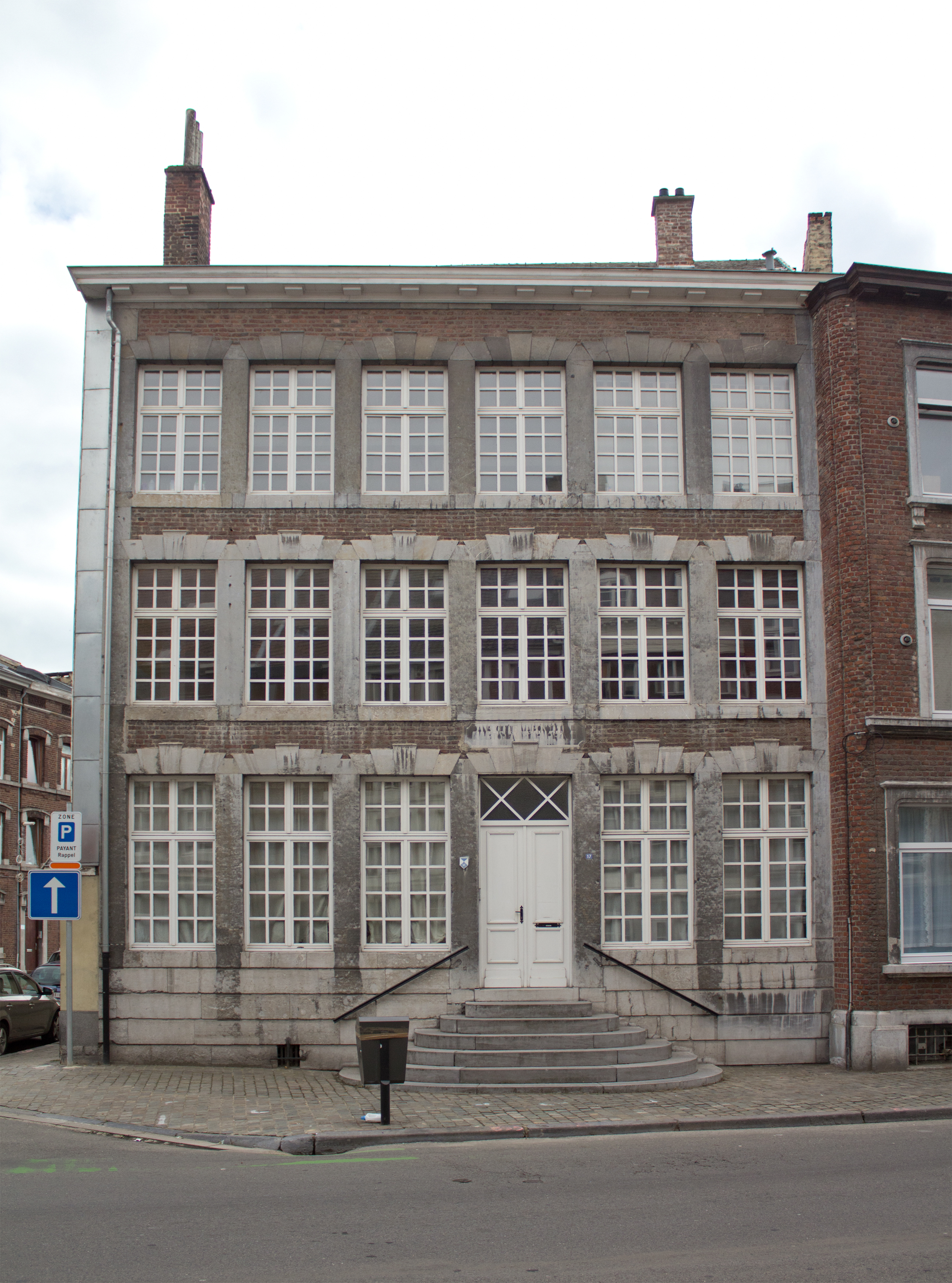
The Maison Vivroux in Verviers where Pirenne was born in 1862

Belgium was invaded by the German Empire in August 1914. After several months of fighting, the majority of the country was placed under German military occupation. Ghent University closed at the time of the invasion. One of Pierenne's four sons, Pierre, was killed fighting in the Belgian army at the Battle of the Yser in November 1914.

From 1915, the German occupation authorities sought to re-open Ghent University. The aim, in line with the Flemish policy (Flamenpolitik) was to transform it into a Dutch-language institution in line with the longstanding aspirations of the Flemish Movement. Pirenne opposed the move on patriotic grounds and was supported by colleagues including the fellow historian Paul Fredericq who had been a longstanding advocate of the "Flemishisation" of the university. Pirenne and Fredericq were both arrested in March 1916 and deported to Germany. The German officer questioning Pirenne asked why he insisted on answering in French when it was known that Pirenne spoke excellent German and had done postgraduate studies at Leipzig and Berlin. Pirenne responded: "I have forgotten German since 3 August 1914", date of the German invasion of Belgium. The imprisonment of the Ghent professors raised protests in neutral countries.

Pirenne was held in Crefeld, then in Holzminden, and finally in Jena, where he was interned from 24 August 1916 until the end of the war. He was denied books, but he learned Russian from soldiers captured on the Eastern Front and subsequently read Russian-language histories made available to him by Russian prisoners. This gave Pirenne's work a unique perspective. At Jena, he began his history of Medieval Europe, starting with the fall of Rome. He wrote completely from memory. Rather than a blow-by-blow chronology of wars, dynasties and incidents, A History of Europe presents a big-picture approach to social, political and mercantile trends.

=== After the war ===
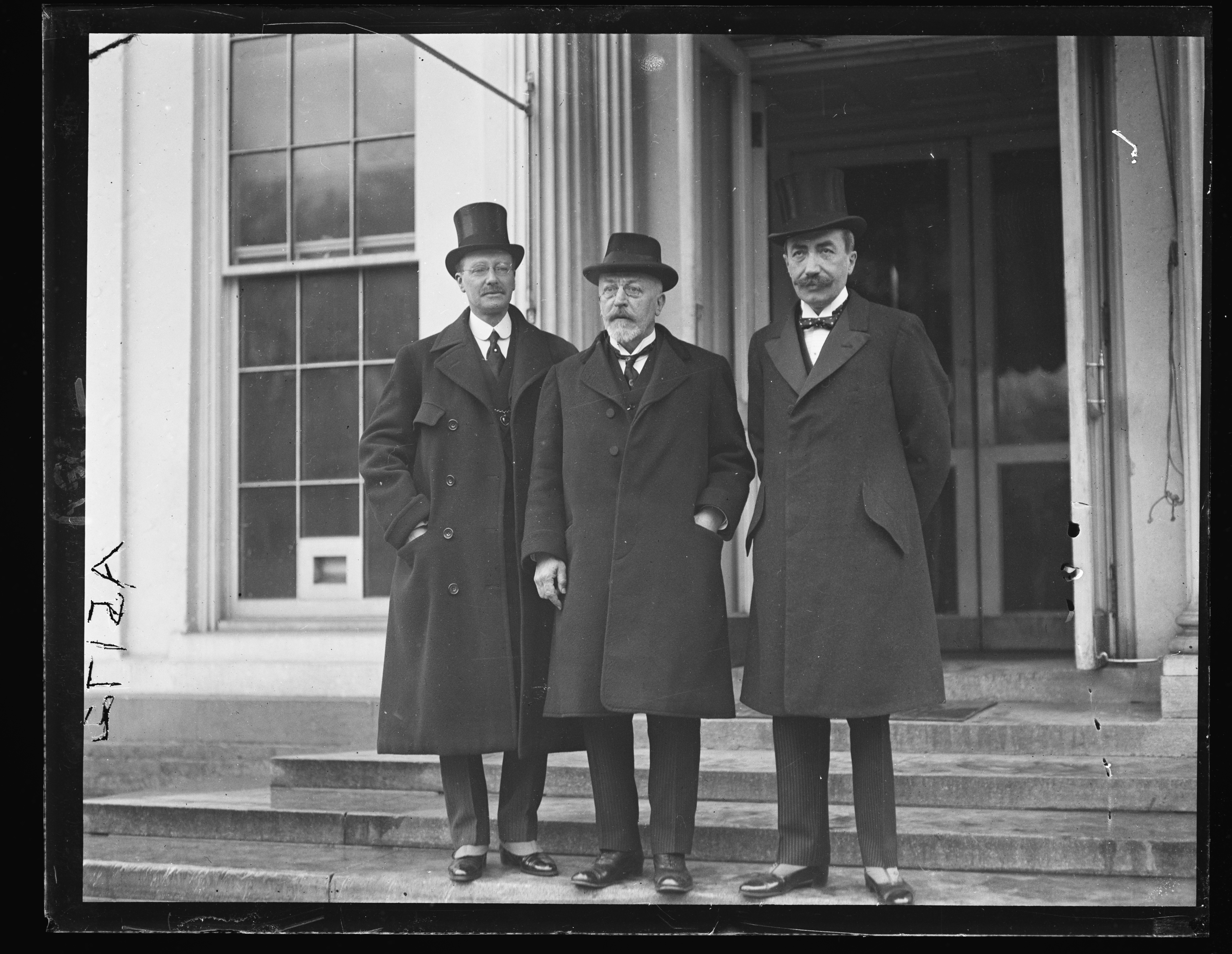
Pirenne (centre) pictured during a visit to the White House in Washington, D.C. in 1922

After the war, he reflected the widespread disillusionment in Belgium with German culture, while taking a nuanced position which allowed him to criticize German nationalism without excluding German works from the scholarly canon. He attacked race theory and Völkisch nationalism as the underlying causes of German wartime excesses. His earlier belief in the inevitable progress of humanity collapsed, so he began to accept chance or the fortuitous in history and came to acknowledge the significance of single great individuals at certain points in history.

At the conclusion of the war, Henri Pirenne stopped his work on A History of Europe in the middle of the 16th century. He returned home and took up his life. He died at Uccle, Brussels in 1935. His son Jacques Pirenne, who had survived the war to become a historian in his own right, discovered the manuscript. He edited the work by inserting dates for which his father was uncertain in parentheses. Jacques wrote a preface explaining its provenance and published it, with the English translation appearing in 1956. It stands as a monumental intellectual achievement.

== Theses and works ==
=== Pirenne's Theses on the formation of European towns & the Caliphate’s Mediterranean Trade ===
Pirenne first expressed ideas on the formation of European towns in articles of 1895; he further developed the idea for this thesis while imprisoned in Germany during World War I. He subsequently published it in a series of papers from 1922 to 1923, followed by a number of book-length works, a famous encyclopedia article (also turned into a book) and finally by his final, posthumously published study of changes in Mediterranean trade. He spent the rest of his life refining the thesis with supporting evidence. The most famous expositions appear in Medieval Cities: Their Origins and the Revival of Trade (1925, based on a series of lectures of 1922) and in his posthumous Mohammed and Charlemagne (1937), published from Pirenne's first draft.

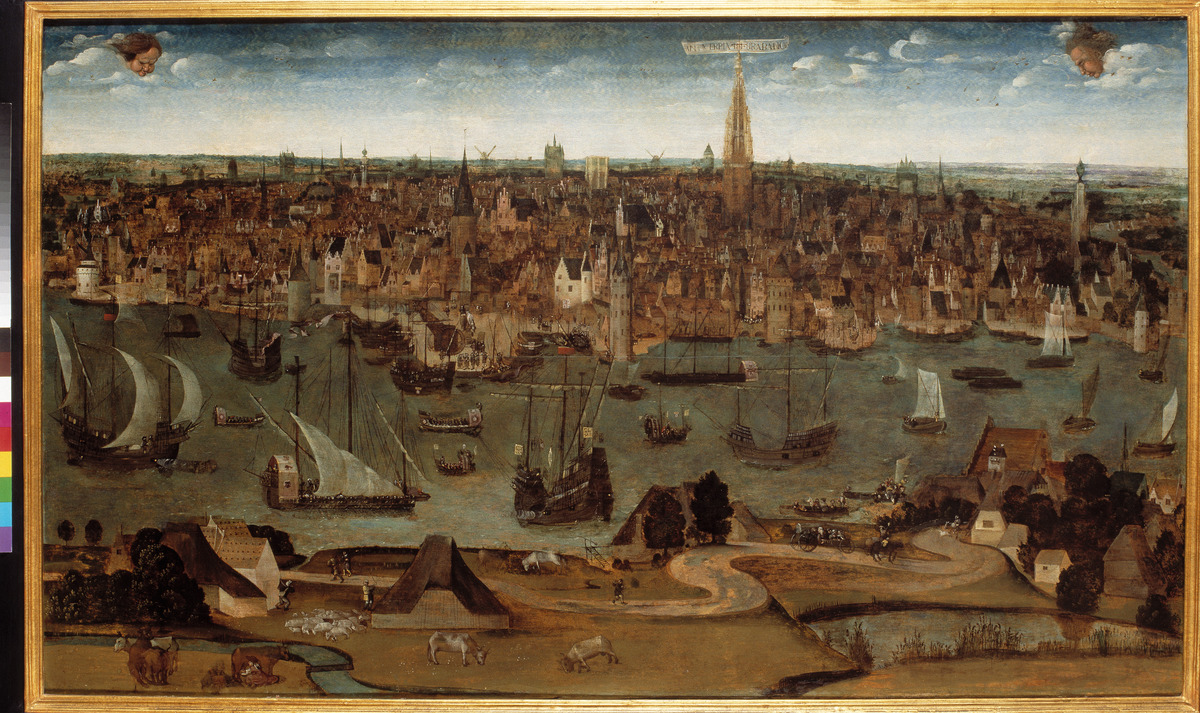
View of the city of Antwerp (c. 1540)

"He became renowned for his two theses," writes Norman Cantor. "No doctoral student in medieval history in the 1950's would dare approach his comprehensive exams without master of the two Pirenne theses and the debate they generated." Because these two theses interact with one another—and because they are presented side by side in Pirenne’s most famous work, The Medieval City—they tend to be spoken of as a single theory of economic and urban development in the Middle Ages: 'The Pirenne Thesis.'

First Thesis on Medieval Cities

In brief, the first Pirenne Thesis, an early essay in economic history diverging from the narrative history of the 19th century, notes that in the ninth century long-distance trading was at a low ebb; the only settlements that were not purely agricultural were the ecclesiastical, military and administrative centres that served the feudal ruling classes as fortresses, episcopal seats, abbeys and occasional royal residences of the peripatetic palatium. When trade revived in the late tenth and eleventh centuries, merchants and artisans were drawn to the existing centres, forming suburbs in which trade and manufactures were concentrated. These were "new men" outside the feudal structure, living on the peripheries of the established order. The feudal core remained static and inert. A time came when the developing merchant class was strong enough to throw off feudal obligations or to buy out the prerogatives of the old order, which Pirenne contrasted with the new element in numerous ways. The leaders among the mercantile class formed a bourgeois patriciate, in whose hands economic and political power came to be concentrated.

Pirenne's thesis takes as axiomatic that the natural interests of the feudal nobility and of the urban patriciate, which came to well-attested frictions in the thirteenth and fourteenth centuries, were in their origins incompatible. This aspect of his thesis has been challenged in detail.

Second Thesis on Mediterranean Trade

Traditionally, historians had dated the Middle Ages from the fall of the Western Roman Empire in the 5th century, a theory Edward Gibbon famously put forward in the 18th century, and which is inexorably linked to the supposition of a Roman "decline" from a previous classic ideal. Pirenne postponed the demise of classical civilization to the 8th century. He challenged the notion that Germanic barbarians had caused the Western Roman Empire to end and he challenged the notion that the end of the Western Roman Empire should be equated with the end of the office of emperor in Europe, which occurred in 476. He pointed out the essential continuity of the economy of the Roman Mediterranean even after the barbarian invasions, and that the Roman way of doing things did not fundamentally change in the time immediately after the "fall" of Rome. Barbarian Goths came to Rome not to destroy it, but to take part in its benefits; they tried to preserve the Roman way of life. Mid-to-late twentieth century formulation of a historical period characterized as "Late Antiquity" emphasizes the transformations of ancient to medieval worlds within a cultural continuity, and European archaeology of the first millennium, even extends the continuity in material culture and patterns of settlement below the political overlay as reaching as late as the eleventh century. Without overturning the richness of detail and particularity exhumed in these studies critiquing Pirenne, more recent scholarship on coin-flow across the Mediterranean world redeems the basic arc of Pirenne's argument in a rhetorically stripped down, data-driven form.

Qualification of New Findings (2024–Present)

The new findings do not refute a common objection that the cultural collapse—with many economic corolaries—of the Imperial remnants of the Roman Empire began centuries earlier. But, upon close reading, neither does Pirenne's provocative study in Mohammed and Charlemagne.

=== Islam and the Early Middle Ages ===
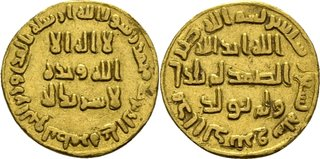
7th-century gold dinar of Abd al-Malik ibn Marwan

According to Pirenne, the real break in Roman history occurred in the 8th century as a result of Arab expansion. Islamic conquest of the area of today's south-eastern Turkey, Syria, Palestine, North Africa, Spain and Portugal ruptured economic ties to western Europe, cutting the region off from trade and turning it into a stagnant backwater, with wealth flowing out in the form of raw resources and nothing coming back. This began a steady decline and impoverishment so that, by the time of Charlemagne, western Europe had become almost entirely agrarian at a subsistence level, with no long-distance trade.

In a summary, Pirenne stated that "Without Islam, the Frankish Empire would probably never have existed, and Charlemagne, without Muhammad, would be inconceivable." That is, he rejected the notion that barbarian invasions in the 4th and 5th centuries caused the collapse of the Roman Empire. Instead, the Muslim conquest of north Africa made the Mediterranean a barrier, cutting western Europe off from the east, enabling the Carolingians, especially Charlemagne, to create a new, distinctly western form of government. Pirenne used statistical data regarding money in support of his thesis. Much of his argument builds upon the disappearance from western Europe of items that had to come from outside. For example, the minting of gold coins north of the Alps stopped after the 7th century, indicating a loss of access to wealthier parts of the world. Papyrus, made only in Egypt, no longer appeared in northern Europe after the 7th century; writing reverted to using parchment, indicating its economic isolation.

Pirenne's thesis did not convince most of the historians at the time of its publication, but historians since that time generally agree it has stimulated debate on the Early Middle Ages, and has provided a provocative example of how periodization would work. It continues to inform historical discussion in the 21st century, with more recent debate focusing on whether later archaeological discoveries refute the thesis or demonstrate its fundamental viability.

Freshly performed data-analysis of coin-flow around the Mediterrannean during the middle-ages, strongly supports the most basic premise of Pirenne's late-study: A massive collapse and restructuring of Mediterranean trade correlates, chronologically and in other respects, with the rise of the Caliphate beginning in the 7th and 8th centuries.

Belgian history

"[Pirenne's History of Belgium] was studied by the royal family, officers were made to read it in the military colleges, barristers in Brussels expounded it, schoolchildren received it as a prize for good examination results, for the bourgeoisie in town and country and the literary élite it was essential reading. On publication in the summer of 1911 the fourth volume sold seven hundred copies within three days. This was partly, but certain not entirely, due to the exceptional quality of Pirenne's insight and style."

— Ernst Kossmann, historian

Pirenne's other major idea concerned the nature of medieval Belgium. Belgium as an independent nation-state had appeared in 1830 only a generation before Pirenne's birth; throughout Western history, its fortunes had been tied up with the Low Countries, which now include the Netherlands, Luxembourg and parts of northern France. Furthermore, Belgium lies across the great linguistic divide between French and Dutch. The unity of the country might appear accidental, something which Pirenne sought to disprove in his History of Belgium (1899–1932) by tracing Belgium's history back to the Roman period. His ideas, promoting a form of Belgian nationalism, have also proved controversial.

Pirenne's Histoire de Belgique, published in seven volumes from 1899–1932, stressed how traditional and economic forces had drawn the Flemish and Walloons together. Pirenne, inspired by patriotic nationalism, presupposed the existence of a unified "Belgian civilisation" – in a social, political, and ethnic sense – which predated its 1830 independence by centuries. Although a liberal himself, his history was written with such balance that Catholics, liberals and socialists across the divides in Belgium's pillarized society could quote from it with equal respect in publications, newspapers, and even in political gatherings. It was also innovative by the standards of contemporary national histories in avoiding the concept of a racially defined Volksgeist (national spirit) but argued that Belgium had developed naturally as a cosmopolitan society to serve as a mediator between Latin and Germanic Europe.

Pirenne's history cemented his reputation as one of Belgium's leading public intellectuals in his lifetime. His thesis remains crucial to the understanding of Belgium's past, but his notion of a continuity of Belgian civilization forming the basis of political unity has lost favour. Some Belgian scholars have argued that the creation of their country was a historical chance. Pirenne's argument that the long Spanish rule in the Low Countries had little continuing cultural impact has likewise fallen, in the face of new research since 1970 in the fields of cultural, military, economic, and political history. Henri Pirenne donated the majority of his personal library to the Academia Belgica in Rome. In 1933, the seventh volume received was awarded the Francqui Prize on Human Sciences.

=== Medieval Cities ===
Pirenne was also the author of Medieval Cities: Their Origins and the Revival of Trade (1925), a book based on lectures he delivered in the United States in 1922. In this book, he contends that through the period from the tenth to the twelfth centuries, Europe reclaimed control of the Mediterranean from the Muslim world, and opened up sea routes to the Orient. This allowed the formation of a merchant/middle class and the development of that class's characteristic abode, the city.

He argued that capitalism originated in Europe's cities, as did democracy. His "Merchant Enterprise School" opposed Marxism but shared many of Marx's ideas on the merchant class. Pirenne's theory of a commercial renaissance in towns in the 11th century remains the standard interpretation.

=== A History of Europe ===
Pirenne wrote a two-volume A History of Europe: From the End of the Roman World in the West to the Beginnings of the Western States, a remarkable but incomplete work which Pirenne wrote while imprisoned in Germany during World War I. It was published by his son in 1936. A translation into English, by Bernard Miall, was first published in Great Britain in 1939 by George Allen and Unwin.

== Bibliography ==
- Pirenne, Henri. Histoire de Belgique (7 vols.) (1899–1932)
- Pirenne, Henri (1909). "The Formation and Constitution of the Burgundian State (Fifteenth and Sixteenth Centuries)" (PDF). The American Historical Review. 14 (3): 477–502. doi:10.2307/1836443. JSTOR 1836443.
- Pirenne, Henri. Belgian Democracy, Its Early History (1910, 1915) 250 pp. History of towns in the Low Countries online free
- Pirenne, Henri. "The Stages in the Social History of Capitalism", The American Historical Review, 19:494, April 1914 in JSTOR
- Pirenne, Henri. Medieval Cities: Their Origins and the Revival of Trade (1925)
- Pirenne, Henri. A History of Europe (1936).
- Pirenne, Henri. Economic and Social History of Medieval Europe (1956)
- Pirenne, Henri. Mohammed and Charlemagne (1937)
- Pirenne, Henri. "Reflexions d'un Solitaire". (edited by Jacques-Henri Pirenne) in Bulletin de la Commission royale d'Histoire 1994 160(3–4): 143–257. ISSN 0001-415X. First publication of his wartime prison journal.
- Pirenne, Henri (1969). Medieval cities: their origins and the revival of trade. Frank D. Halsey (trans.). Princeton University Press. p. 253. ISBN 0-691-00760-8. | 2014 ISBN 9780691162393
- Lyon, Bryce; Lyon, Mary (1976). The Journal de guerre of Henri Pirenne. Amsterdam: North-Holland. ISBN 9780720404432.

== See also ==
- Paul Fredericq – historian, regarded as the Flemish equivalent of Pirenne
